= Wilburton station (Sound Transit) =

Light rail station in Bellevue, Washington

59 Wilburton
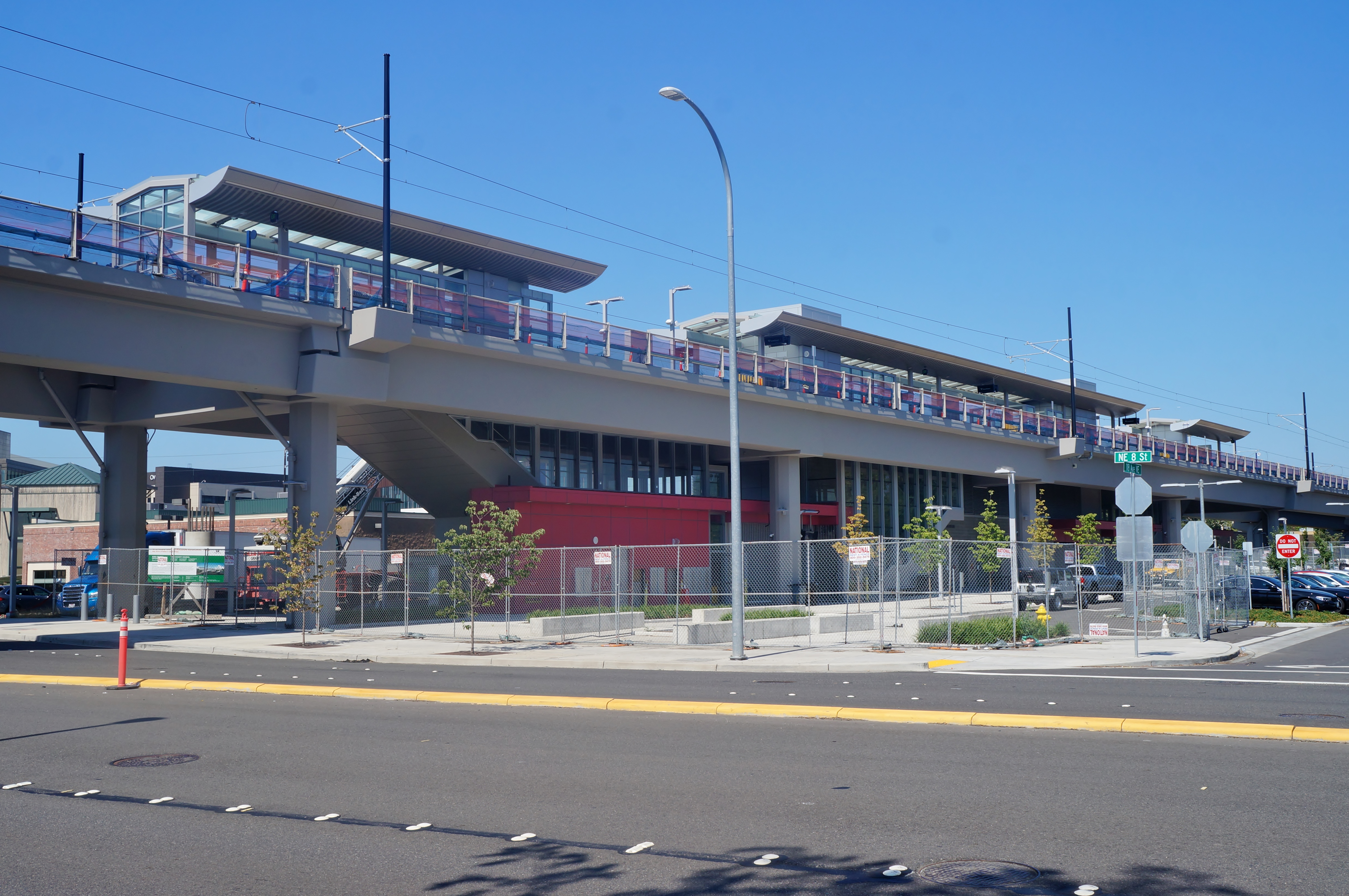
- Under construction in August 2022

General information
- Location: 800 118th Avenue Northeast; Bellevue, Washington, U.S.
- Coordinates: 47°37′05″N 122°11′02″W
- System: Link light rail
- Operator: Sound Transit
- Platforms: 1 island platform
- Tracks: 2
- Connections: King County Metro

Construction
- Structure type: Elevated
- Accessible: Yes

History
- Opened: April 27, 2024

Passengers
- 276 daily weekday boardings (2025); 95,275 total boardings (2025)

Services
Preceding station	Sound Transit	Following station
Link
Bellevue Downtown toward Lynnwood City Center	2 Line	Spring District toward Downtown Redmond
Location

Wilburton station is an elevated Link light rail station in Bellevue, Washington, United States. It is served by the 2 Line, part of Sound Transit's Link light rail system, and opened in April 2024 as part of the line's starter segment. The station serves the area immediately east of Downtown Bellevue, including Lake Bellevue and the Overlake Hospital Medical Center.

== Location ==
Wilburton station is located along the BNSF Woodinville Subdivision corridor, north of NE 8th Street and east of 116th Avenue Northeast. The Overlake Hospital Medical Center campus, part of the city's "hospital district", is to the northwest of the station, along Interstate 405. The area's land use consists predominantly of low-rise commercial and office spaces, with multifamily residential on the eastern fringes.

The Overlake Hospital Medical Center area is currently served by the RapidRide B Line and other King County Metro bus routes.

== History ==
The passage of Sound Transit 2 in 2008 funded the East Link light rail project, including the construction of a station near the Overlake Hospital Medical Center campus. The station was proposed as a potential interim terminus for a truncated line between Seattle and Bellevue, in the event of a smaller package than the one that was passed by voters. The project's preferred alternative, adopted in 2009, placed an elevated station along NE 12th Street to the east of Interstate 405, just north of the hospital campus. In 2010, the City of Bellevue requested a tunneled alignment for the light rail line through its downtown, which shifted the station to the BNSF alignment north of NE 8th Street.

In 2015, the station's temporary working name of "Hospital" was replaced with "Wilburton", its permanent name. Construction on the station and approach structures began in 2017. The station opened on April 27, 2024, as part of the first phase of the 2 Line between Bellevue and Redmond.

== Station layout ==
Wilburton station consists of a single island platform situated above street level on the north side of NE 8th Street. At street level, the station has two sets of stairs, escalators and elevators leading to the platform, as well as ticket vending machines and rider information. On the east side of the station there is a small kiss and ride facility, as well as covered bicycle parking. At the north end of the station is a pedestrian pathway crossing over Sturtevant Creek (a tributary of Kelsey Creek), heading towards the future Eastside Rail Corridor trail and Overlake Hospital Medical Center.

A pedestrian bridge connecting both sides of NE 8th Street was opened on June 23, 2024, as part of the Eastrail trail system. It is 500 feet (150 m) long and primarily uses prefabricated steel trusses; the bridge cost $32 million to construct and was funded by the city and county governments. The bridge includes a 121-foot (37 m) mural with historic photographs and illustrations from the Japanese American community of the Bellevue area. The piece, named Golden Repair, references the Japanese practice of kintsugi to restore broken pieces of pottery with golden lacquer.
