= 2 Line (Sound Transit) =

Light rail line in the Seattle metropolitan area

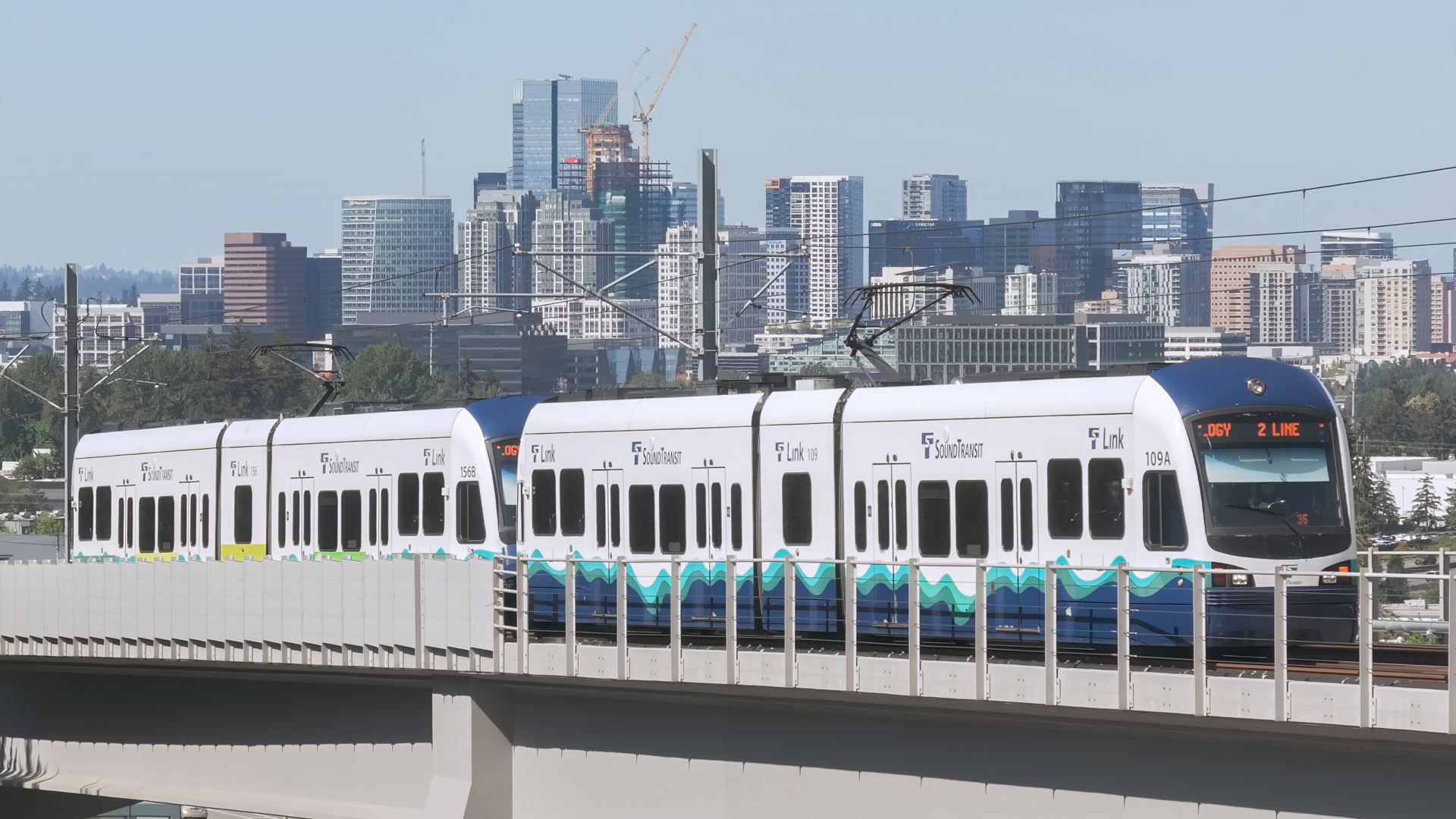
- An eastbound 2 Line train viewed from State Route 520 with Downtown Bellevue in the background

Overview
- Other names: East Link Extension; Blue Line
- Owner: Sound Transit
- Locale: Seattle, Washington, U.S.
- Termini: Lynnwood City Center (west); Downtown Redmond (east)
- Stations: 26
- Website: soundtransit.org

Service
- Type: Light rail
- System: Link light rail
- Daily ridership: 6,511 (2025, weekdays)
- Ridership: 2,074,239 (2025)

History
- Opened: April 27, 2024

Technical
- Line length: 33 mi (53 km)
- Number of tracks: 2
- Character: At grade, elevated, and underground
- Track gauge: 4 ft 8 1/2 in (1,435 mm) standard gauge
- Electrification: Overhead line, 1,500 V DC
- Operating speed: 55 mph (89 km/h)

The 2 Line is a light rail line serving the Seattle metropolitan area in the U.S. state of Washington. It is part of Sound Transit's Link light rail system and runs for 33 miles (53 km), connecting Snohomish County and Seattle to the Eastside region of King County. The line has fourteen stations it shares with the 1 Line between Lynnwood and Downtown Seattle; the 2 Line then serves twelve standalone stations in Seattle, Mercer Island, Bellevue, and Redmond.

The project to build the 2 Line, originally named the East Link Extension, was approved by voters in the 2008 Sound Transit 2 ballot measure. Its construction costs were projected at $3.7 billion. The line uses the Homer M. Hadley Memorial Bridge, one of the Interstate 90 floating bridges, which was constructed in 1989 with the intent to convert its reversible express lanes to light rail. Early transit plans from the 1960s proposed an Eastside rail system, but preliminary planning on the system did not begin until Sound Transit's formation in the early 1990s.

The proposed alignment of the East Link project was debated by the Bellevue city council in the early 2010s, with members split on two different routes south of Downtown Bellevue; city funding for the downtown segment's tunnel was also debated and ultimately included in the final agreement. The alignment was finalized in 2013, after more than two years of debate, and delayed the beginning of construction to 2016 and the completion of the project several years beyond 2021. The Seattle–Overlake section was scheduled to open in 2023, but was postponed due to construction issues on the floating bridge section that resulted in the replacement of its plinths.

The first section of the 2 Line opened in 2024 with ten stations between South Bellevue and Redmond Technology. The line was extended northeast to Downtown Redmond station in May 2025. The full line opened on March 28, 2026, and includes the world's first light rail service on a floating bridge. The Pinehurst infill station opened in September 2026. The entire line is expected to carry 50,000 daily riders by 2030.

== History ==
=== Background and early proposals ===
The Eastside suburbs underwent rapid development into bedroom communities after the 1940 opening of the first Lake Washington floating bridge, which replaced a cross-lake ferry system as the main connection to Seattle. While private bus operators ran routes over the Lake Washington Floating Bridge from Seattle to Eastside towns, the municipal Seattle Transit System opted not to extend its routes. The 1963 opening of the Evergreen Point Floating Bridge fueled further growth, leading to traffic congestion on both bridges during peak periods. By 1965, more than 150,000 people lived on the Eastside; the King County government predicted in 1965 that up to 550,000 people would live in Eastside cities by 1990.

In the 1960s, the construction of a rapid transit system for the Seattle metropolitan area was explored by municipal and regional governments. The initial system, serving the city of Seattle, would be extended east to Bellevue via Mercer Island and an additional floating bridge in a later phase, to be built by 1990. The state government amended its plans for a parallel floating bridge to Mercer Island to include exclusive right of way for rapid transit. The Eastside section of the rapid transit system was expanded to include branches to Eastgate and the Bel-Red area, with provisions to extend the system to Redmond. Intermediate stations would be located at Rainier Avenue in Seattle, on Mercer Island, and in Downtown Bellevue. The proposal, funded with federal grants, was put to a public vote as part of the Forward Thrust referendums in 1968 and 1970, requiring a 60 percent majority in order to use increased property taxes. During both referendums, voters were unable to meet the required majority to approve the rapid transit plan; the first earned a simple majority, while the second failed due to local economic conditions.

Metro Transit was created by a 1972 referendum to operate a countywide bus system and resumed planning work for a Seattle–Eastside transit system to be built using the new Interstate 90 floating bridge. A transit element for the new floating bridge was requested by the Puget Sound Council of Governments and a group of municipal leaders from Seattle and the Eastside, seeking to avoid additional traffic. A memorandum of agreement signed by the Washington State Highway Commission, Metro Transit, and local governments in late 1976 designated the center two lanes of the eight-lane bridge for use by transit and Mercer Island residents, with possible conversion to a fixed-guideway system in the future. The Puget Sound Council of Governments (PSCOG), a regional planning organization, determined in a 1981 study that light rail would be a feasible way to relieve traffic on the Interstate 90 corridor and recommended that Metro include it in their long-term plan. A joint study by Metro and the PSCOG in 1986 explored several alternative routes for an Eastside light rail system, recommending a route across the Interstate 90 bridge and branching from Downtown Bellevue to Kirkland and Bothell, via the Eastside railway, and Downtown Redmond, via State Route 520. While the light rail plan was left unfunded, provisions were made to accommodate a future Eastside light rail connection in the Downtown Seattle bus tunnel that opened in 1990.

In 1990, the state legislature called for the creation of a regional transit authority to fund the construction of a light rail system serving the Seattle metropolitan area. A work group, known as the Joint Regional Policy Committee, drafted a transit plan in March 1993 that conceived of a 105-mile (169 km) rapid rail system with a line between Seattle, Bellevue, and Redmond served by through-trains from Snohomish County. The plan recommended a hybrid rail and bus system, with rail serving as the primary form of high-capacity transit on the Interstate 90 corridor. Later that year, the Central Puget Sound Regional Transit Authority, later renamed Sound Transit, was established and began planning a package of transit projects for a public referendum. The committee's plan was downsized to 69 miles (111 km) of light rail, including a line from Seattle to Bellevue and Overlake, and submitted to voters on March 14, 1995. The $6.7 billion transit package was rejected by voters, in part due to an opposition campaign funded by Bellevue developer Kemper Freeman. A smaller, $3.9 billion system was proposed the following year, with a light rail line serving Seattle and Seattle–Tacoma International Airport instead of a system spanning the entire metropolitan area; express buses from Seattle to the Eastside would be funded by the package in place of light rail service. The removal of the Eastside light rail line was opposed by politicians and business groups in the area, with prominent developers funding an opposition campaign. The package was approved by the Puget Sound region's voters on November 5, 1996, earning a majority of votes in Eastside cities. Express buses between Seattle and the Eastside, funded by Sound Transit, began operating in 1999.

=== Planning and ballot measures ===
In the late 1990s, Sound Transit and the Washington State Department of Transportation (WSDOT) co-led a study into congestion-relief measures on the State Route 520 corridor, including the use of light rail on either of the floating bridges. The final Trans-Lake Washington Study, published in 2002, recommended further development of a high-capacity fixed transit system on Interstate 90 to supplement a new floating bridge carrying State Route 520. While the Trans-Lake Washington Study was underway, Sound Transit formed a steering committee in 1998 to assess configuration options for Interstate 90 and its existing reversible express lane. The committee recommended the addition of high-occupancy vehicle lanes (HOV lanes) to both directions of Interstate 90 by narrowing the existing lanes, leaving the reversible lanes ready for future transit use. The lane conversion, coupled with additional HOV ramps on Mercer Island, was approved by Sound Transit, WSDOT, and the Federal Highway Administration (FHWA) in 2004. An amendment to the 1976 memorandum signed by Metro and municipal governments to build the Interstate 90 bridge was drafted and signed, authorizing the conversion of the reversible lanes for high-capacity transit.

Sound Transit added the Eastside high-capacity transit project to its preliminary long-range plan in 2004, exploring several conceptual corridors and modes that branched out from a main line on Interstate 90. The Bellevue–Overlake corridor was chosen as the preferred routing of the Eastside line, which would be either light rail trains or a bus rapid transit system that could be converted to rail, in July 2005. Light rail was chosen as the preferred mode by Sound Transit in July 2006, after receiving endorsements from the city councils of Bellevue, Kirkland, and Redmond. The $3.9 billion light rail project, named "East Link", would be part of the next regional transit ballot measure and run from Seattle to Bellevue, the Microsoft campus, and downtown Redmond. A 15-mile (24 km) segment of East Link was included as part of 50 miles (80 km) of light rail in the $47 billion Roads and Transit package, which combined Sound Transit projects with highway expansion. Under the plan, light rail service from Seattle to the Overlake Hospital Medical Center east of Downtown Bellevue would begin in 2021, followed by an extension to the Microsoft campus in Overlake by 2027; the segment between Overlake and downtown Redmond would be prioritized for future extension using additional funding, with engineering and property acquisition work covered by the Roads and Transit package. The package attracted opposition from environmentalists, developer Kemper Freeman, and Eastside elected officials, and failed to pass in the November 2007 election.

Sound Transit continued to hold public hearings and open houses on the design of East Link after the rejection of the Roads and Transit package as part of the environmental review process. A smaller, transit-only package named "Sound Transit 2" with 34 miles (55 km) of light rail was passed by voters in November 2008, including funds for East Link. The $18 billion plan projected that light rail trains would reach Bellevue in 2020 and Overlake Transit Center in 2021, and also included preliminary engineering for an eventual extension to downtown Redmond.

=== Floating bridge engineering and litigation ===
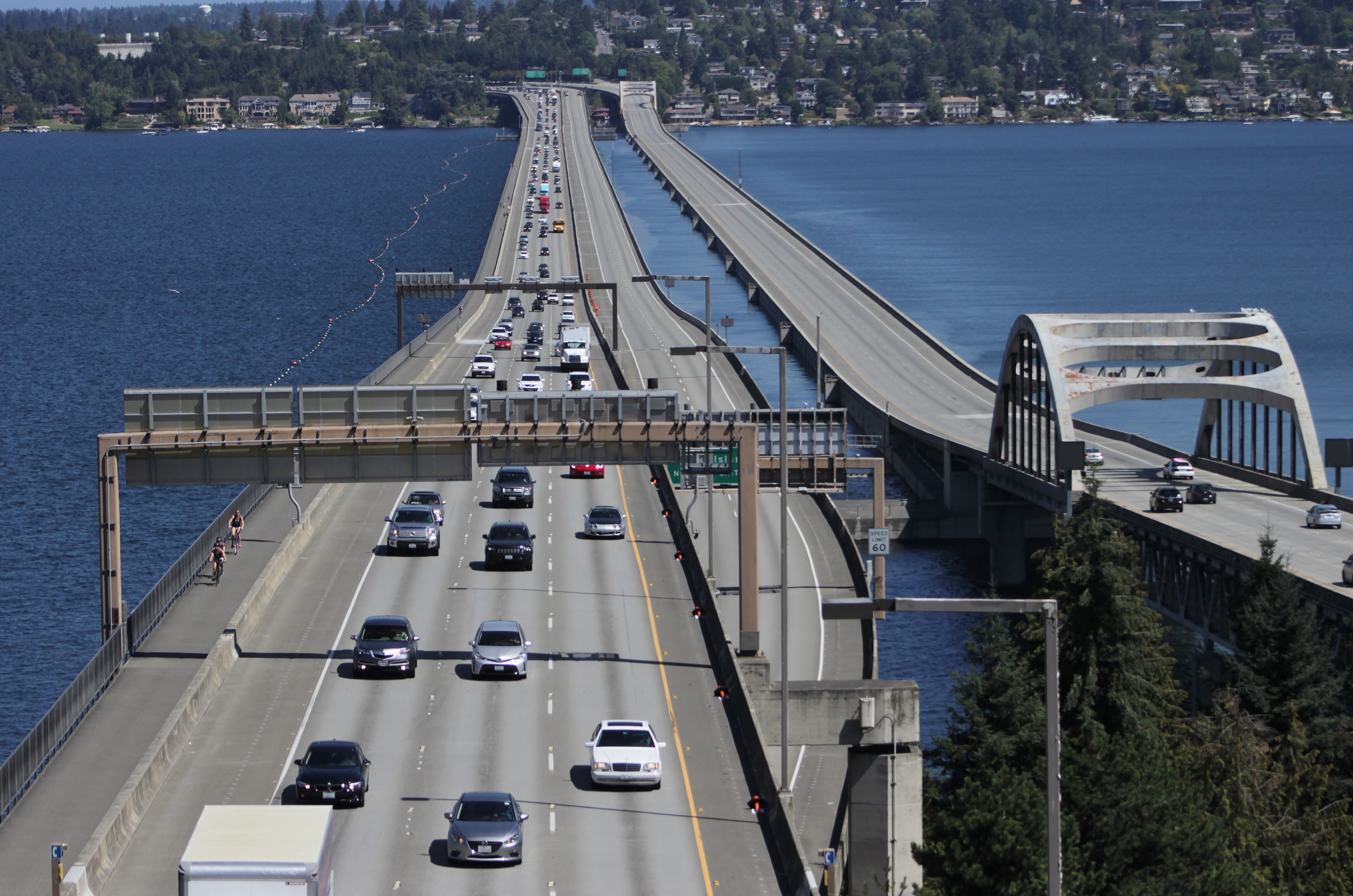
Looking east on the Homer M. Hadley Memorial Bridge in 2016

In 2005, WSDOT conducted a live load test on the Interstate 90 floating bridge using 65-foot (20 m) flatbed trucks carrying concrete weights to simulate the weight of light rail trains and test its performance. Using the results, which matched those from an earlier computer simulation, WSDOT concluded that the bridge could carry the weight of light rail trains after minor changes to sections of the transition spans were made during construction. Sound Transit later determined in an engineering study that rail joints could be designed to accommodate the multi-directional movement of the floating bridge, with special design considerations and speed restrictions. In 2008, the state legislature's Joint Transportation Committee commissioned an independent review of potential issues that would arise with light rail operations on the floating bridge. The panel identified 23 issues, including stray currents from the electrical system that could cause corrosion, the weight of the tracks and catenary on top of the deck, the design of the expansion joints, and a needed seismic upgrade for the bridge. The panel recommended several mitigation measures for the identified issues, which were accepted for consideration by Sound Transit, and gave the preliminary go-ahead on the project.

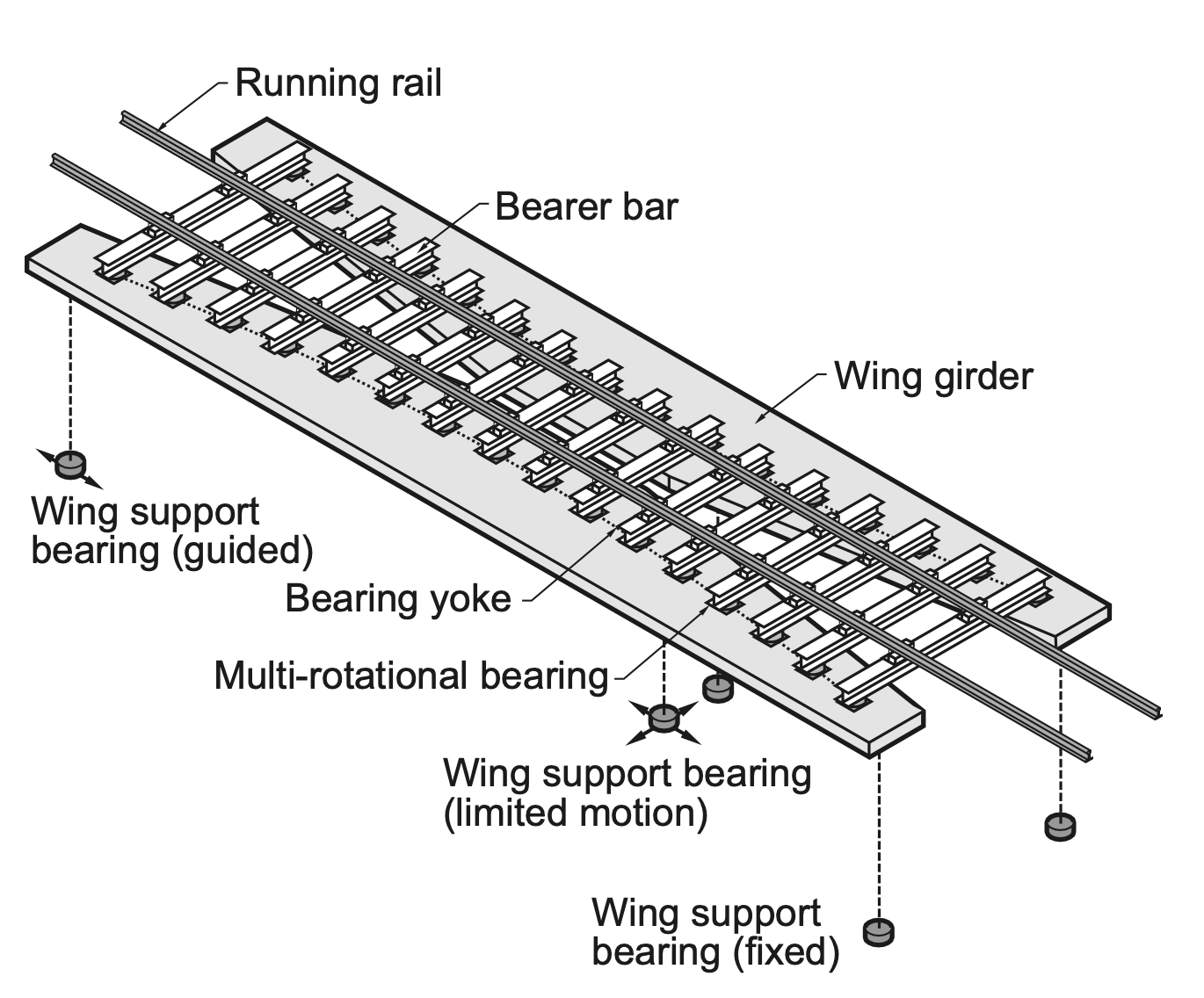
Diagram of the track bridge system used on the floating bridge, which allows motion on three axes while supporting trains traveling at full speed

Sound Transit authorized a $53 million budget for preliminary engineering work on the floating bridge segment in 2011, contracting out to a team led by Parsons Brinckerhoff and Balfour Beatty. Preliminary design on the track bridge system to be used over the bridge's expansion joints was completed in early 2012, following the development of computer models and prototypes tested at the University of Washington. A 5,000-foot-long (1,500 m) replica of the bridge's light rail tracks, complete with an electrified overhead line, was built for field testing at the Transportation Technology Center in Pueblo, Colorado, using two light rail vehicles from Central Link. The track bridge system was designed to accommodate the bridge's six ranges of motion, changes in lake level, and allow for trains to operate at the full speed of 55 miles per hour (89 km/h).

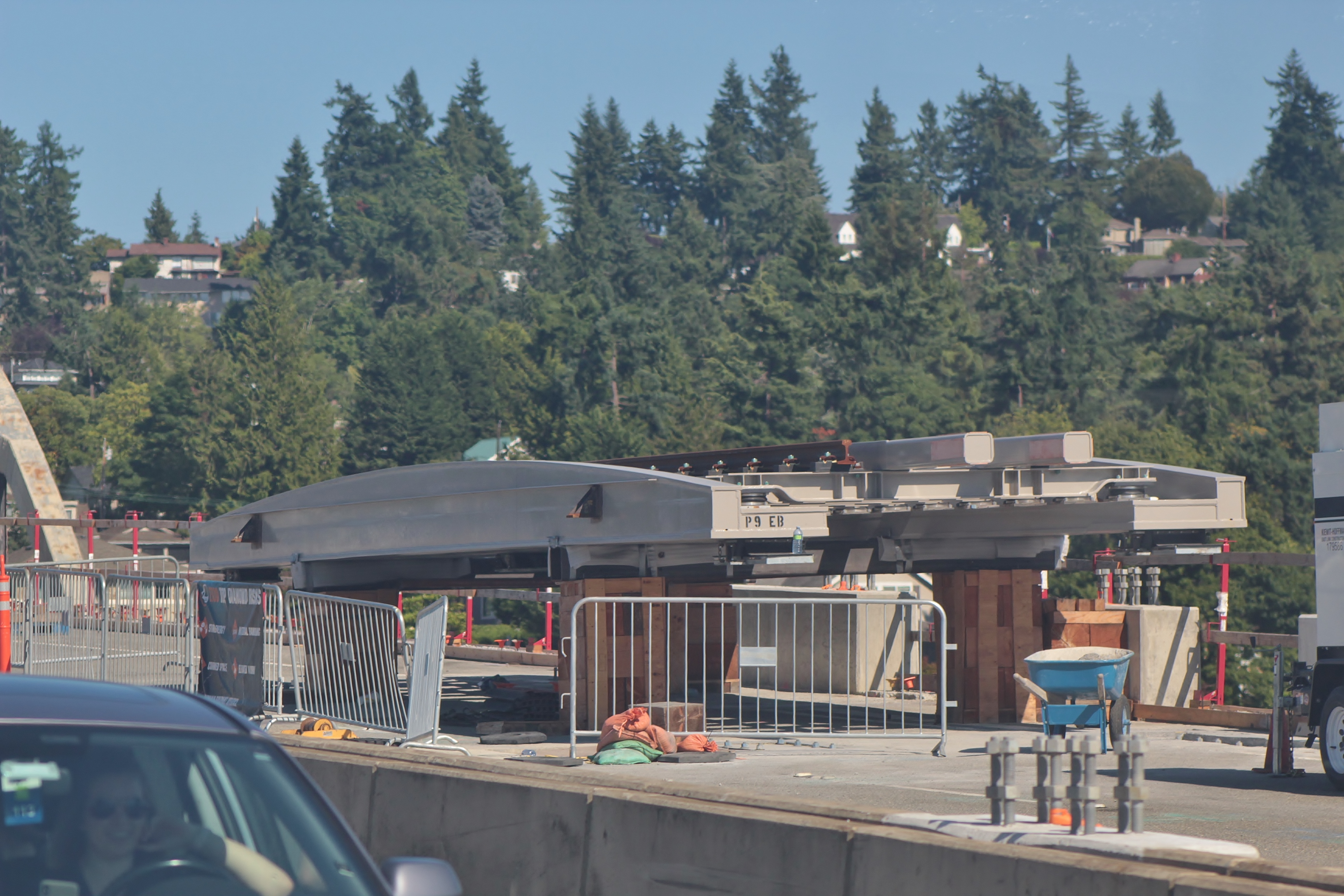
A completed track bridge being prepared for installation in 2019

The 43-foot-long (13 m) track bridges consist of curved steel platforms placed under the tracks, connected to the railroad ties by pivoting bearings that move independently of the tracks, allowing them to remain parallel; the pivoting bearings would also stabilize the railroad ties during an earthquake, moving slightly apart to accommodate the seismic waves. Under the steel platforms, a series of flexible bearings would allow for the tracks to rise and fall by up to 3.6 inches (9.1 cm) while following the motion of the bridge deck. Trains would be halted from the bridge in the event of a major windstorm, with gusts of 40 miles per hour (64 km/h) from the north or 50 miles per hour (80 km/h) from the south. The design of the system, which would make East Link the first railway over a floating bridge ever constructed, was recognized by Popular Science magazine in their 2017 "Best of What's New" awards. The design of the seismic system and steel frames to be installed inside the floating pontoons added $225 million in construction costs, increasing the construction budget by 46 percent, and was paid for using contingency funds.

The use of the floating bridge for light rail service remained controversial after the passage of Sound Transit 2 in 2008. Bellevue developer Kemper Freeman filed a lawsuit against the state government in 2009, arguing that the 18th amendment of the state constitution prohibited the use of the gas tax-funded bridge for non-road uses. The case was argued before the state supreme court, who ruled in April 2011 that the case should be heard in a lower court first. Days later, Freeman re-filed the lawsuit in the Kittitas County Superior Court, naming Governor Christine Gregoire and Secretary of Transportation Paula Hammond as defendants. A judge in the Kittitas court issued a summary judgement in favor of Sound Transit and WSDOT, effectively halting the lawsuit. A third lawsuit was filed by Freeman in the state supreme court, where a 7–2 decision in September 2013 deemed that the conversion of the express lanes for light rail was not unconstitutional.

The city of Mercer Island sued Sound Transit and WSDOT in February 2017 over the loss of HOV lane access following the then-planned closure of the reversible express lanes on I-90. The city government expressed concerns over increased congestion, while Sound Transit and WSDOT stated that an exception for single-occupancy vehicles to use the lanes would violate federal regulations. The city council voted to suspend development permits for light rail construction during the dispute; Sound Transit responded by seeking their own legal action to prevent the suspension, which was believed to be unlawful. A settlement was reached in June that allowed for the permits to be unsuspended in exchange for a Sound Transit payment of $10 million to mitigate traffic congestion and parking shortages expected to be caused by the closure of South Bellevue Park-and-Ride. A second lawsuit was filed by Mercer Island in 2020 that alleged Sound Transit's plans to develop a regional bus interchange at Mercer Island station was in violation of the 2017 agreement. The city council agreed to cease litigation in December 2022 in exchange for a new agreement with Sound Transit with a $2.1 million payment to fund additional traffic mitigation for the interchange.

=== Route refinement in Bellevue ===
The Sound Transit 2 package did not include a specific route for East Link in Bellevue and Redmond, due to the time needed to evaluate alignment options. The Sound Transit Board divided the line into five segments and identified 19 total potential alignments, including tunnel routes in Downtown Bellevue favored by the city's government, that were studied in the project's draft environmental impact statement in 2008. In southern Bellevue (named Segment B), the alternatives considered included an at-grade line along Bellevue Way, an at-grade or elevated alignment on 112th Avenue Southeast, and a route following Interstate 405 on the east side of Mercer Slough Nature Park. In Downtown Bellevue (Segment C), three alternatives called for tunnels, while two were elevated guideways along 110th or 112th avenues, and a sixth alignment consisted of an at-grade line split between 108th and 110th avenues. In the Bel-Red area (Segment D), the alignments traveled above or along new east–west streets proposed by the city, transitioning into an at-grade and retained cut alignment along State Route 520 to Overlake Transit Center. The Overlake to Redmond segment (Segment E), studied by the project but not funded for construction, diverged at West Lake Sammamish Parkway, generally serving stations at the Redmond Town Center mall and on the east side of Marymoor Park.

The Bellevue City Council endorsed the 112th Avenue alignment, along with a tunnel in Downtown Bellevue under 106th Avenue, in February 2009. Microsoft voiced its opposition to the tunnel alignment, which the company believed would jeopardize funding for the segment of the line serving its corporate headquarters in Overlake; the tunnel was estimated to add $600 million in costs to the project's budget. On May 14, 2009, Sound Transit Board chose the two-street surface alignment on 108th and 110th avenues as its preferred alternative, but indicated that it would prefer a tunnel under 108th Avenue if $500 million in additional funding could be found. In September, the Bellevue City Council requested further review of the options in Downtown Bellevue, and together with Sound Transit proposed a short tunnel under 110th Avenue with one station that would be cheaper to construct and avoid disruptions to the existing Bellevue Transit Center and the 12th Street corridor. The composition of the Bellevue City Council was changed later in the year, with candidates backed by light rail opponent Kemper Freeman winning a majority in the November election. New councilmember Kevin Wallace proposed the "Vision Line", an elevated alignment that followed Interstate 405 and the Eastside Rail Corridor, with its downtown station connected by skybridges and moving walkways.

Bellevue continued to consider four new downtown alignments, as well as options in the South Bellevue area. The city council considered routing trains through the Mercer Slough and on the Eastside Rail Corridor until the National Park Service spoke out against the plan. In March 2010, the city council unanimously endorsed the 110th Avenue tunnel alternative, which would cost an additional $285 million, and drafted a cost savings plan that would levy a local tax to pay for the tunnel. A new alignment in the South Bellevue area using the east sides of Bellevue Way and 112th Avenue, along with the city covering the cost of street reconstruction and utility relocation, was also proposed in order to save $75 million in costs. The Sound Transit Board made the revised tunnel and South Bellevue alignment its new preferred route in April and requested further study into the impacts of rail construction in the Surrey Downs area. Sound Transit also approved the exploration of alternative designs for the Overlake Hospital station, the alignment through the Bel-Red area, and the Overlake Village station in Redmond. An additional downtown option, using a shorter tunnel beginning at Northeast 2nd Street and an at-grade crossing of Main Street, was also proposed by Sound Transit to help reduce costs amid an expected shortfall in revenue.

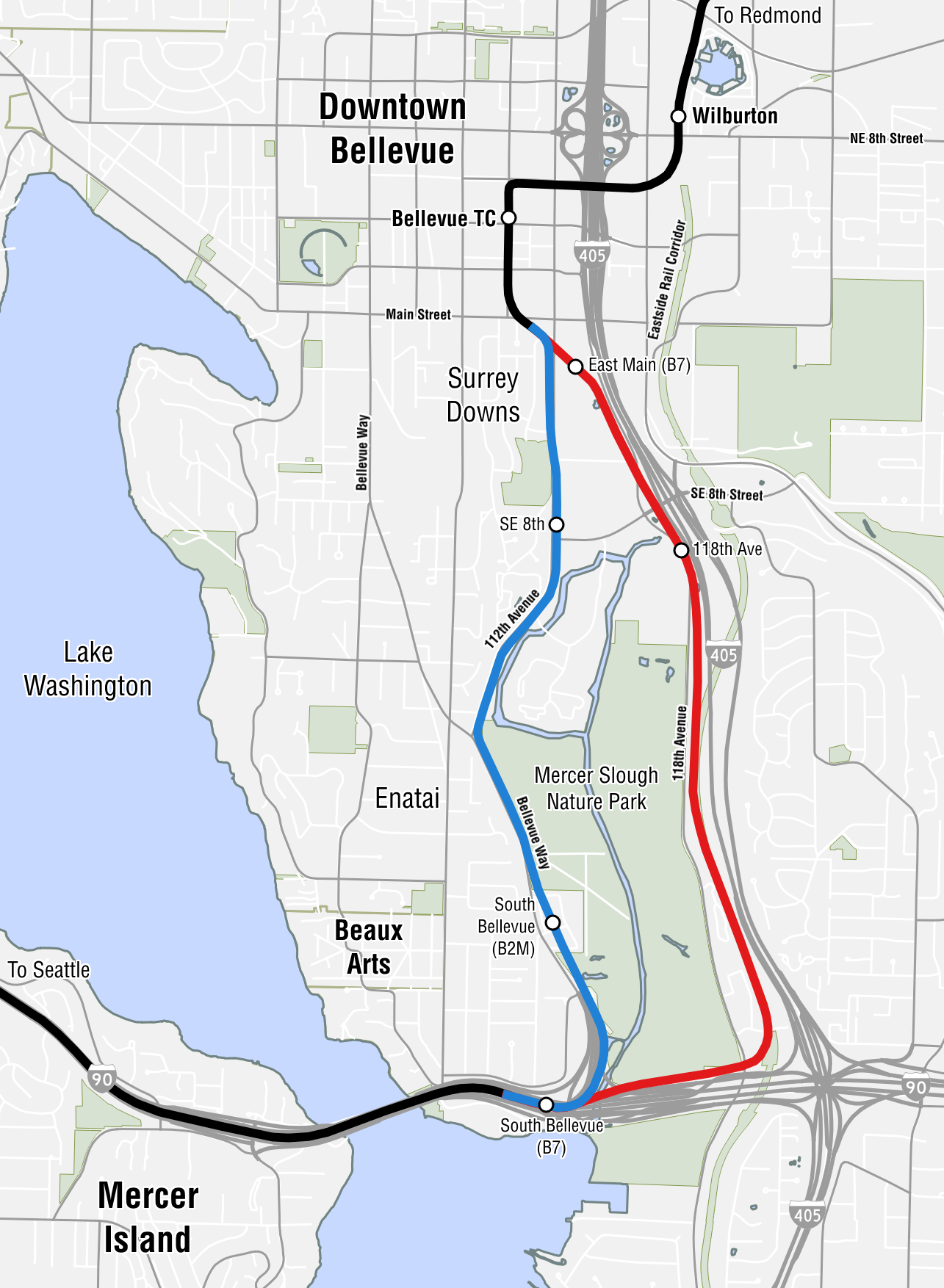
Map of the preferred alignments selected by Sound Transit (B2M, colored blue) and the Bellevue City Council majority (B7, colored red)

In July, the Bellevue City Council voted 4–3 to reject Sound Transit's six proposed South Bellevue options, in favor of its preferred alternative ("B7") using the Eastside Rail Corridor. The Sound Transit Board voted to continue studying the 112th Avenue alignment and identified the corridor as its preferred route ("B2M"), drawing criticism from Bellevue mayor Don Davidson, who spoke before the board. The city council responded by approving $670,000 in funds towards study into the B7 alternative to provide an even comparison to Sound Transit's proposed 112th Avenue alignment. The three councilmembers who voted against the study called it a hypocritical move, in the face of financial conservation during the Great Recession, and feared that it would extend the planning period by several years. Sound Transit released its supplemental draft environmental impact statement in November, finding that the B7 alternative would be costlier to construct and require more wetland mitigation and displace more businesses. A public hearing on the document later that month in Bellevue was filled by supporters of the B7 alternative, who outnumbered those arguing in favor of B2M. The delays in deciding the Bellevue route moved the projected opening date for East Link from 2021 to 2022 for an at-grade alignment and 2023 for a tunneled line. A group of fourteen business executives representing Boeing, Microsoft, T-Mobile USA, and Symetra, among others, sent a letter to the Bellevue city council in May requesting it to cooperate with Sound Transit and expedite the planning process.

The divided opinions of the Bellevue city council, led by B7 supporter Kevin Wallace and B2M supporter Claudia Balducci (also a Sound Transit Boardmember) resulted in heated debates, one of which devolved into a shouting match, and accusations of conflicting interests in decisions related to the light rail project. In April 2011, the city council hired an independent investigator to probe for possible conflicts of interest related to the East Link decision. Balducci, through her involvement on the Sound Transit Board, and councilmember Grant Degginger, whose law firm represented Sound Transit in disputes over other projects, were investigated and cleared of any wrongdoing under state laws. Wallace himself became the subject of a separate investigation by the City Attorney's Office after court documents revealed that his real estate company had negotiated with a freight railroad looking to use the Eastside Rail Corridor; he was later cleared by the independent investigator, having not sought to profit from city council activities. The City of Bellevue adopted an ethics code in 2013 that banned specific conflicts of interest as a result of the investigation. In the November 2011 city council election, Freeman and other anti-light rail developers funded challengers to Balducci and Chelminiak (themselves funded by Spring District developer Wright Runstad), as well as opposition messages and advertisements. Balducci and Chelminiak were re-elected and joined by newly elected councilmember John Stokes, replacing Degginger, in continuing the 4–3 makeup of the council.

The preliminary Bellevue city council report was released in May 2011, finding that the B7 alternative would be feasible, but cost up to $140 million more than Sound Transit's B2M alternative. The study received a mixed reaction from the council and members of the public, and the final version was cut after the cost of the study increased to $730,000. After the release of the study, high-level talks with Sound Transit were initiated by a delegation of Bellevue officials, including city manager Steve Sarkozy and councilmembers Degginger and Wallace. The negotiations moved into public sessions in mid-July, focusing on design modifications to Sound Transit's B2M alternative on 112th Avenue that would lessen impacts on nearby homeowners. A final environmental impact statement was published on July 15, which excluded a modified version of the B7 alternative, and the Sound Transit Board selected a modified version of its 112th Avenue route and the 110th Avenue tunnel as its preferred route on July 28. The new version included an HOV lane on Bellevue Way, grade separation on 112th Avenue, the replacement of a station at Southeast 8th Street with one at Main Street, and a noise wall and landscape buffer next to the tracks. The Bellevue city council approved a preliminary agreement in August in support of the 112th Avenue alignment, and continued its negotiations with Sound Transit ahead of a memorandum of agreement due later in the year. Further modifications in September eliminated a retained-cut trench favored by the city council and moved the planned crossover from the east side of 112th Avenue to the west side from Southeast 6th Street to Southeast 15th Street. The deadline for the memorandum was originally set for October, but it was extended into November while awaiting additional public comments solicited by the city council. The city council also asked for a grade-separated overpass for light rail trains crossing 112th Avenue at Southeast 15th Street. An umbrella memorandum of understanding between Sound Transit and the City of Bellevue was approved unanimously by the city council on November 15, placing East Link on 112th Avenue and funding the downtown tunnel with a $100 million contribution from the city. After the signing of an agreement with WSDOT to use the Interstate 90 floating bridge, Sound Transit received a Record of Decision for the East Link project issued by the Federal Transit Administration (FTA), formally ending the environmental review process.

Sound Transit initiated design work on East Link in early 2012, commissioning a cost-savings analysis for the Bellevue segments to find elements where project costs could be reduced. The analysis was released for public comment in April, proposing $60 million in savings by moving the downtown station out of the 110th Avenue tunnel, removing trenches from the 112th Avenue section, and moving the historic Frederick W. Winters House out of the planned guideway. Bellevue proposed an additional design change for the 112th Avenue corridor, moving the planned elevated flyover for trains into a trench under the raised road, after Surrey Downs residents complained of the potential visual and noise impacts. A shortlist of design modifications was approved for further study by the Sound Transit Board in late June, with an endorsement from the city council. After the publication of the final cost-savings analysis in September, the Sound Transit Board and Bellevue city council voted to endorse the proposed design modifications to the downtown station, 112th Avenue crossing, and Winters House trench. The design modifications to Bellevue Way and 112th Avenue were opposed by residents of the Enatai and Surrey Downs neighborhoods, who claimed that the changes would restrict road access and lower property values and quality of life. After threatening to block property acquisition and delay the project further, a group representing Enatai residents agreed to changes in the city code that were approved by the city council in February 2013, giving homeowners a larger setback from the tracks and more time to negotiate property sales to Sound Transit. The city council also approved a streamlined permitting process that would expedite planning within Bellevue. The Enatai group had previously sued Sound Transit over impacts to the Mercer Slough and the Winters House, but the lawsuit was rejected by the U.S. District Court in March 2013.

A supplemental environmental impact statement was released in late March, incorporating the Bellevue design modifications and requesting further design of pedestrian bridges over State Route 520 near Overlake Village station in Redmond. The Bellevue city council unanimously approved a final alignment for East Link on April 22, 2013, including up to $53 million in cost savings identified in the 2012 analysis. Days later, Sound Transit approved the same final alignment and design modifications. Public open houses on final design and property acquisitions began in May, and an amended transitway agreement was signed by the City of Bellevue in June. In July 2014, Sound Transit selected a former rail yard located west of the Spring District and its station as the site of the project's 25-acre (10 ha) satellite operations and maintenance facility. The proposed site initially came as a surprise to the City of Bellevue, who had hoped to use it for transit-oriented development, and also attracted an offer from the Mars Hill Church to share the site, which was later rejected. After negotiations with the city, the design of the facility was amended to add 1.6 million square feet (150,000 m^{2}) of commercial and residential development on part of the shrunken yard, and Sound Transit was asked to improve nearby pedestrian and bicycle connections.

In 2015, Sound Transit adopted a $3.7 billion budget for the East Link project, funded primarily by tax revenue and bond proceeds from the Sound Transit 2 package. The FTA agreed to contribute a $1.33 billion loan for the project, as well as $88.7 million in grants. The City of Bellevue also contributed $100 million towards the construction of the downtown tunnel after signing an updated memorandum of understanding in 2015. The new line was initially named the Blue Line in documents until Sound Transit halted its rollout of color-based line names in 2019 after controversy over the use of the Red Line name. It was designated as the 2 Line in 2020.

=== Construction and delays ===
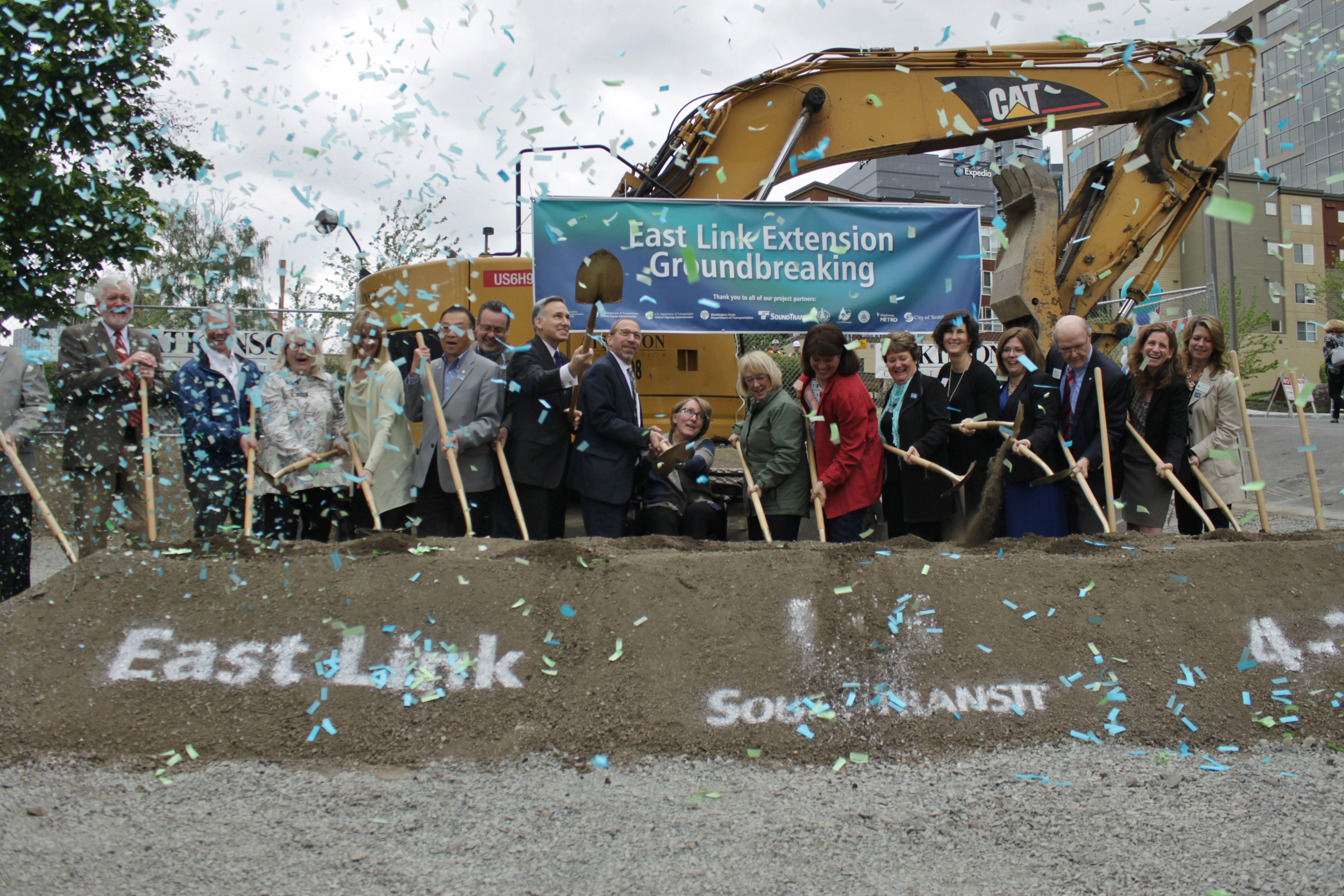
Groundbreaking ceremony for East Link in Bellevue on April 22, 2016

Sound Transit broke ground on the project's Downtown Bellevue tunnel on April 22, 2016, beginning its construction with the demolition of homes in the Surrey Downs area. The tunnel was excavated using sequential mining, as opposed to tunnel boring machines used for Sound Transit's other light rail projects. To prepare for East Link construction on the express lanes of the Interstate 90 floating bridge, which began in June 2017, WSDOT added HOV lanes to the outer lanes of the freeway between Rainier Avenue in Seattle and Bellevue Way. The $283 million project was completed in stages from 2008 to 2012, reducing lane and shoulder widths on the floating bridge to accommodate the new lanes. The bridge's express lanes were closed to traffic on June 5, 2017, and will be rebuilt for light rail trains. Construction was scheduled to move from the pontoons to the bridge deck in 2019.

A total of 170 businesses in Bellevue and Redmond, primarily in the Bel-Red corridor, were relocated to prepare for light rail construction using a Sound Transit fund to cover their moving costs. Among the affected businesses was a ballet school that filed a lawsuit to demand additional compensation; a settlement was reached in April 2016. Demolition work in the South Bellevue, Bel-Red, and Overlake segments of the line also began in early 2017, including the closure of the South Bellevue Park and Ride, which was replaced with several temporary parking lots around the Eastside. By the end of the year, site grading and preparation was underway in Mercer Island and along State Route 520 in Overlake. The first segment of elevated guideway was erected at the future Bellevue Downtown station in December 2017 and in Bel-Red in March 2018. Work on the line's crossing over Interstate 405 in Bellevue began in early 2018, with a falsework constructed under the arches for the bridge. During installation of girders near Overlake Village in late May, a construction worker was killed after falling from a column near State Route 520 and 148th Avenue. Excavation of the Bellevue tunnel was completed in July 2018, approximately five months ahead of schedule, and substantial finishing work on the structure was declared complete in August 2020. Construction on the entire project reached the halfway milestone in April 2019, including 2.86 miles (4.60 km) of elevated guideway and 1 mile (1.6 km) of tracks.

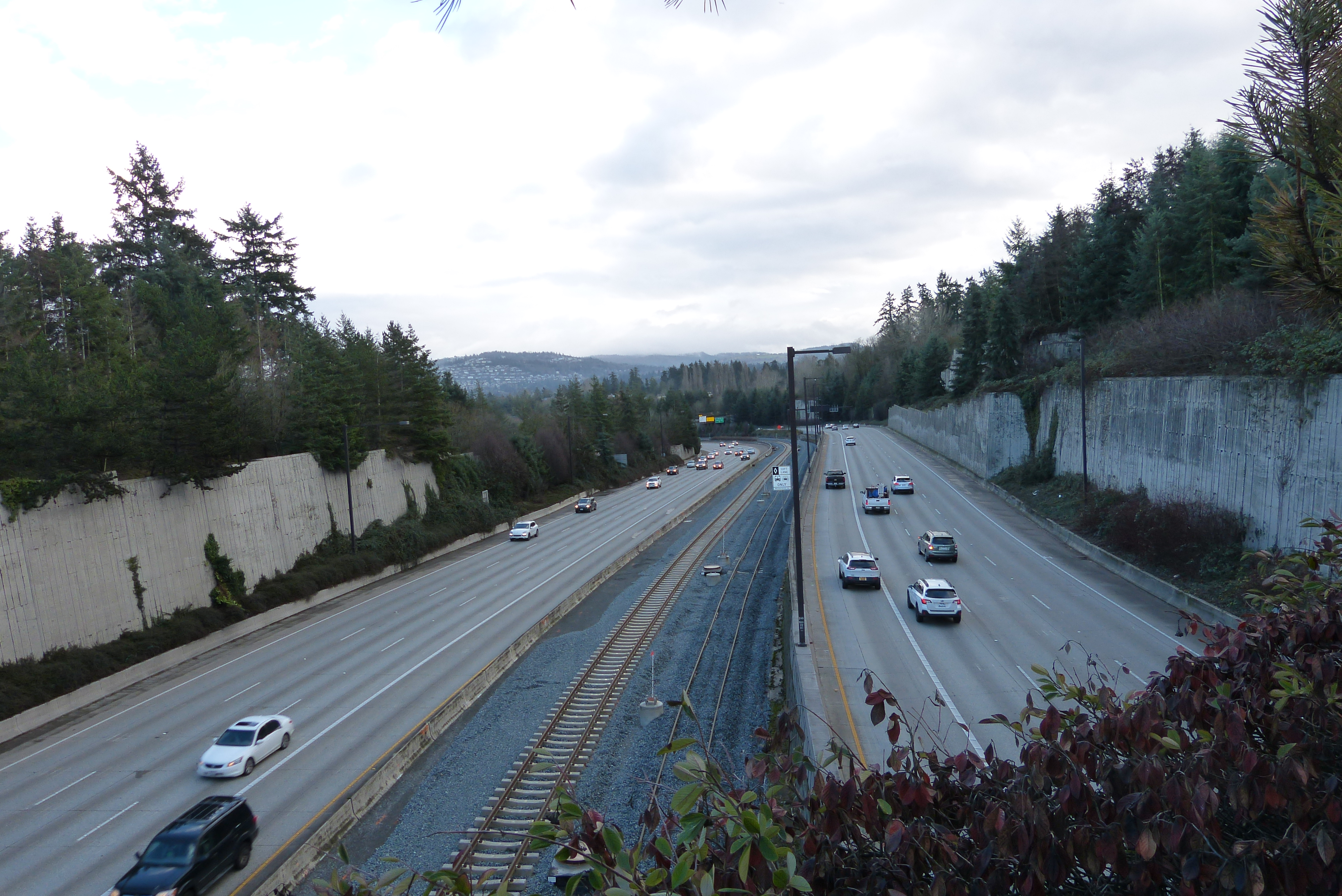
Mercer Island track partially installed in the I-90 median, December 2018

Construction of the line's operations and maintenance facility adjacent to the Spring District began in April 2018 and was completed in May 2021. It includes space for 96 light rail vehicles, 14 service bays, public art, offices, and on-site affordable housing. The Rainier Freeway Station was closed in September 2018 and work on the Judkins Park station began shortly thereafter with the demolition of a freeway overpass. By mid-November, installation of rails and ties began on Mercer Island had begun and work on the elevated guideway near South Bellevue had transitioned towards girder installation using a traveling form system. Construction was originally scheduled to conclude across all segments in 2020, but was delayed by a work stop during the COVID-19 pandemic.

Train testing on the section between Downtown Bellevue and Redmond Technology station began in November 2021. Live wire tests at full speed with trainsets began between Bellevue Downtown and Spring District stations in February 2022. Light rail service was anticipated to begin in June 2023, but was delayed after a series of concrete structures, mainly over 5,455 plinths under the tracks on portions of the 4-mile (6.4 km) Interstate 90 segment, were found in early 2022 to be in need of replacement or reinforcement. The faulty plinths were primarily installed under tracks on the aerial spans and fixed bridge sections, rather than the floating bridge. The concrete work on the section had been observed as early as 2019, but several attempts to remedy the issue were unsuccessful; the issues with the plinths were attributed to "poor concrete workmanship" and delayed oversight and inspection by Sound Transit and project contractors. Demolition of the faulty plinths began in September 2022 after repairs were deemed infeasible and was followed by rebuilding over several work zones. A set of 19,500 nylon fasteners embedded in the plinths were also replaced after the threads were found to have stripped when exposed to a waterproofing compound.

=== Starter line opening ===
Balducci, several Eastside mayors, and other leaders endorsed a plan in 2022 to open a truncated Bellevue–Redmond version of the 2 Line in 2023 to serve local trips while awaiting the completion of the Seattle–Bellevue section with its extended timeline. Sound Transit presented two operational scenarios in December 2022: a truncated 2 Line between South Bellevue and Redmond Technology stations that begins service in early 2024 and is followed by extensions in 2025; or a full opening of the initial line and Downtown Redmond extension in early 2025. The 6.3-mile (10.1 km) "starter line" was proposed to run with 10-minute frequencies and would require service on the Lynnwood Link Extension to be halved until early 2025.

On August 24, 2023, the Sound Transit Board approved a new operating plan for the 2 Line that included the starter line. The line would debut with two-car trainsets that run at 10-minute frequencies for 16 hours per day between South Bellevue and Redmond Technology stations. The remaining sections to Seattle and Downtown Redmond were planned to open in 2025, along with the full length of the 2 Line to Lynnwood. Pre-revenue service testing on the starter line began on November 1, followed by a 40-day period of simulated service that began January 22, 2024.

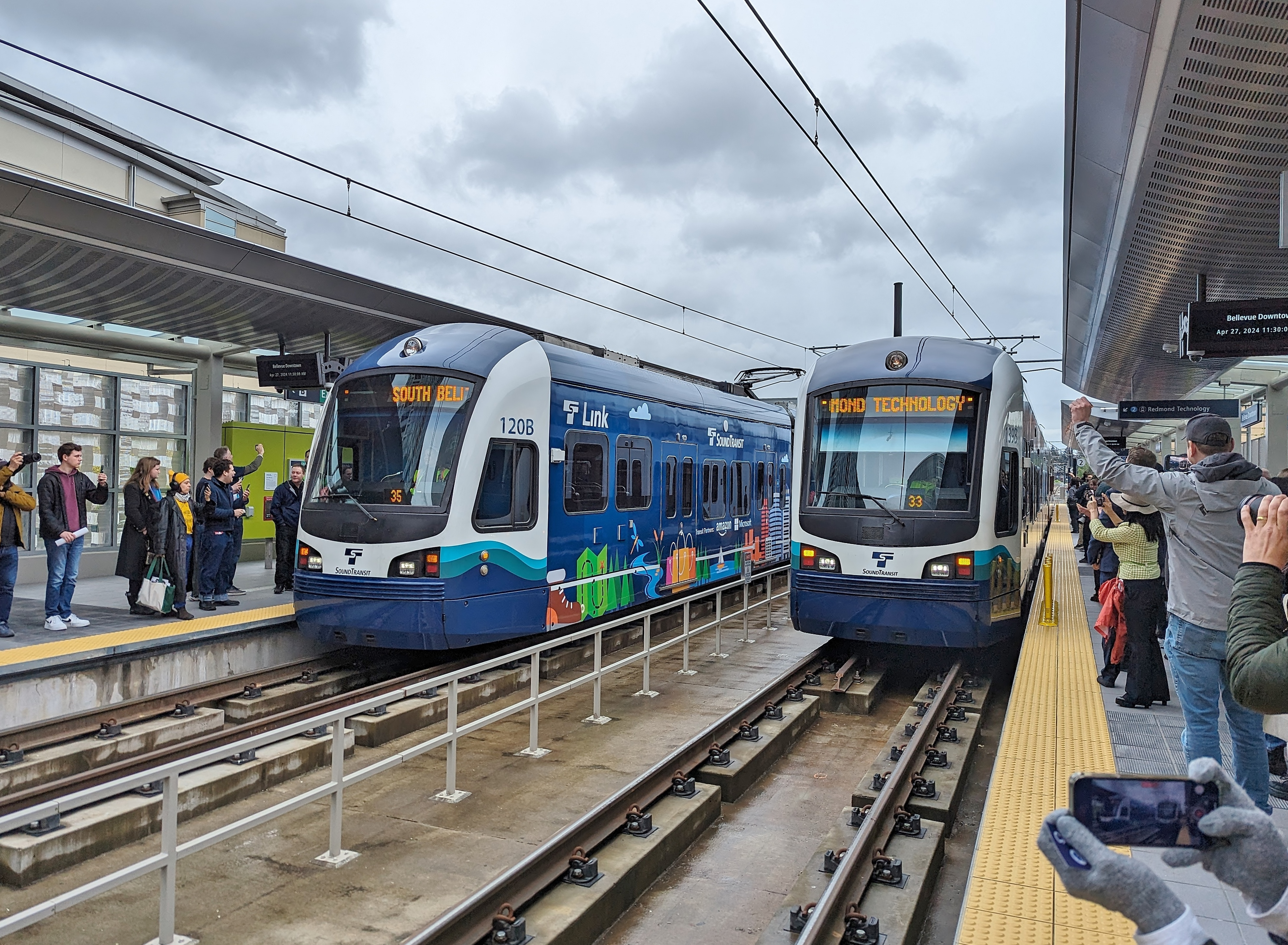
The inaugural 2 Line trains at Bellevue Downtown station on April 27, 2024

Regular passenger service began on April 27, 2024, with a ribbon-cutting ceremony at Bellevue Downtown station and launch parties at all eight stations. The event had a total cost of $370,000 that was fully covered by private sponsorships in addition to $152,500 contributed by Amazon to produce commemorative ORCA cards with preloaded fares. An estimated 35,000 boardings were counted on the inaugural day of service. The line had an average of 3,900 boardings on weekdays and 4,300 boardings on Saturdays during May, its first full month of service.

=== Downtown Redmond Extension ===
The 3.7-mile (6.0 km) Overlake to downtown Redmond segment of East Link was granted engineering and design funding in Sound Transit 2, passed by voters in 2008, leaving a future ballot measure to fund construction. During a funding shortfall in 2010, Sound Transit suspended engineering work on the downtown Redmond segment, which was later restored in 2016. The Sound Transit Board studied several alternative alignments in the downtown Redmond area and selected a route through Marymoor Park and on a disused railroad, terminating at the Redmond Town Center mall. The project was included in the Sound Transit 3 ballot measure, passed by voters in 2016, and preliminary design work began the following year.

The Downtown Redmond Link Extension began construction in October 2019 with main contract awarded to the joint venture of Stacy and Witbeck and Kuney Construction. It was originally anticipated to open in December 2024, but a strike by concrete truck workers delayed work for several months. The project has an estimated cost of $1.53 billion, of which $521 million was financed by a federal loan through the Transportation Infrastructure Finance and Innovation Act in 2021. Sound Transit filed a lawsuit against Microsoft in March 2020 for access to land in the future right of way on State Route 520, after a dispute over payment for the property and easement. The project reached 85 percent completion in February 2024 and train testing began later that year. Operator certification on the section began in January 2025. The extension opened on May 10, 2025, and drew large crowds at both Downtown Redmond and Marymoor Village stations.

=== Crosslake Connection ===
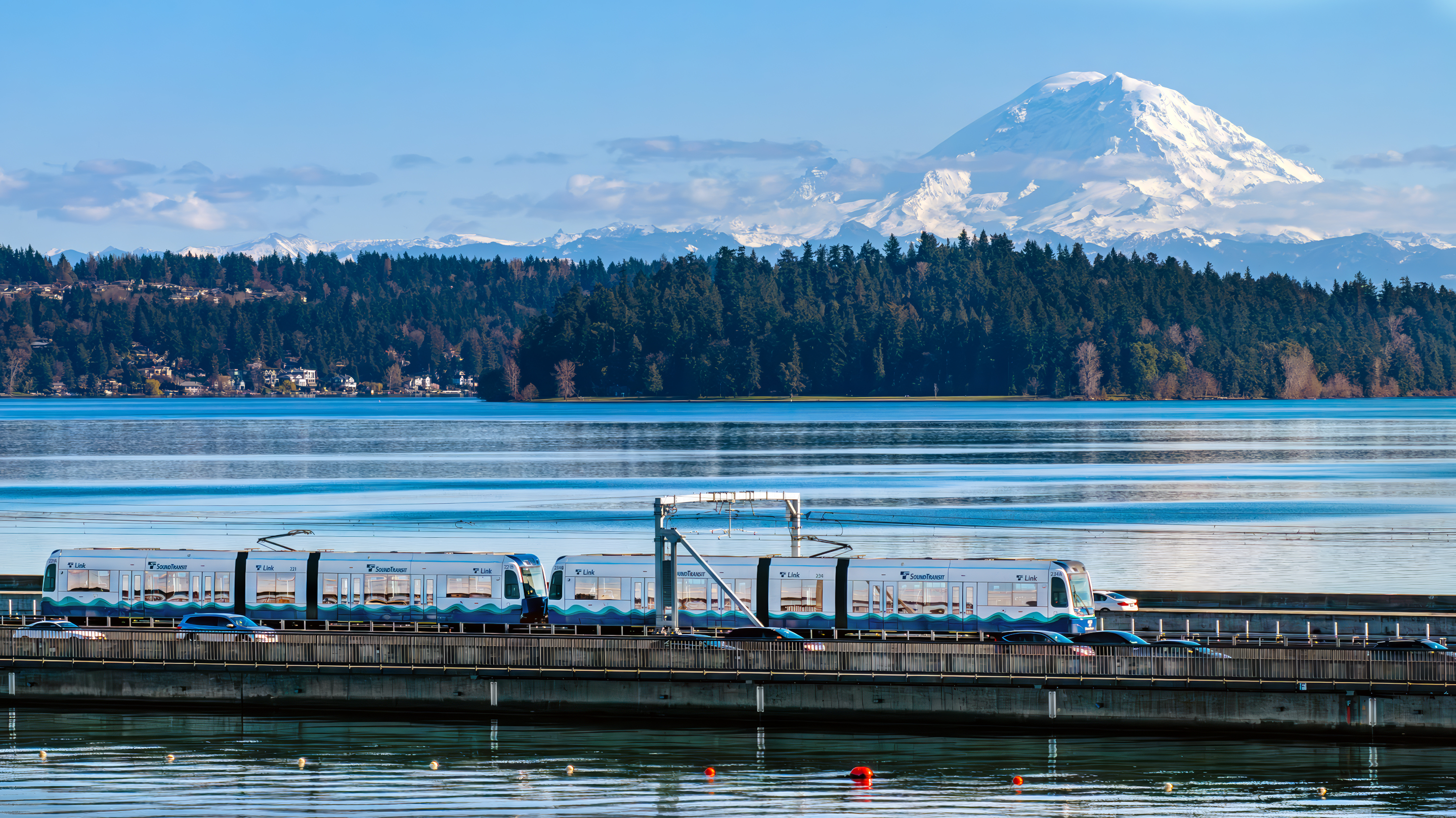
A 2 Line test train crossing Lake Washington in March 2026

Testing on the Mercer Island section began in October 2024 after the repaired plinths were installed and met quality-control standards. The first unpowered train was towed across the floating bridge section in May 2025 and was followed by powered test runs that began on September 8. Sound Transit also tested interlining on the existing 1 Line in June with out-of-service trains to simulate four-minute headways; a full simulation of revenue service with trains every eight minutes is scheduled to take 20 days to complete. Live-wire testing on the 2 Line lasted until late December and was followed by daytime testing and operator training runs that began that month. The Downtown Seattle Transit Tunnel was retrofitted with new signaling and automatic train protection to prepare for the start of interlined service.

Sound Transit began simulated service tests on the entire 2 Line corridor on February 14, 2026. Test trains on the 17-mile (27 km) interlined section between Lynnwood City Center and International District/Chinatown stations, shared with the 1 Line, were opened for passenger use during the six-week simulated service period. These trains were in two-car configurations and are expected to be extended to three cars during full service. The already operational section of the 2 Line between South Bellevue and Downtown Redmond also had its hours extended to midnight. The Seattle–Bellevue section opened on March 28, 2026, with a ribbon-cutting at Judkins Park station and celebrations at several stations on the full corridor. The first trains departed from the station at 10:27 a.m. and were greeted by a water salute from a Seattle Fire Department boat while crossing the floating bridge. Lines to board trains at Judkins Park station extended around the station for several hours. Total ridership across the Link system reached 205,000 passengers on the day of the Crosslake opening.

== Route ==
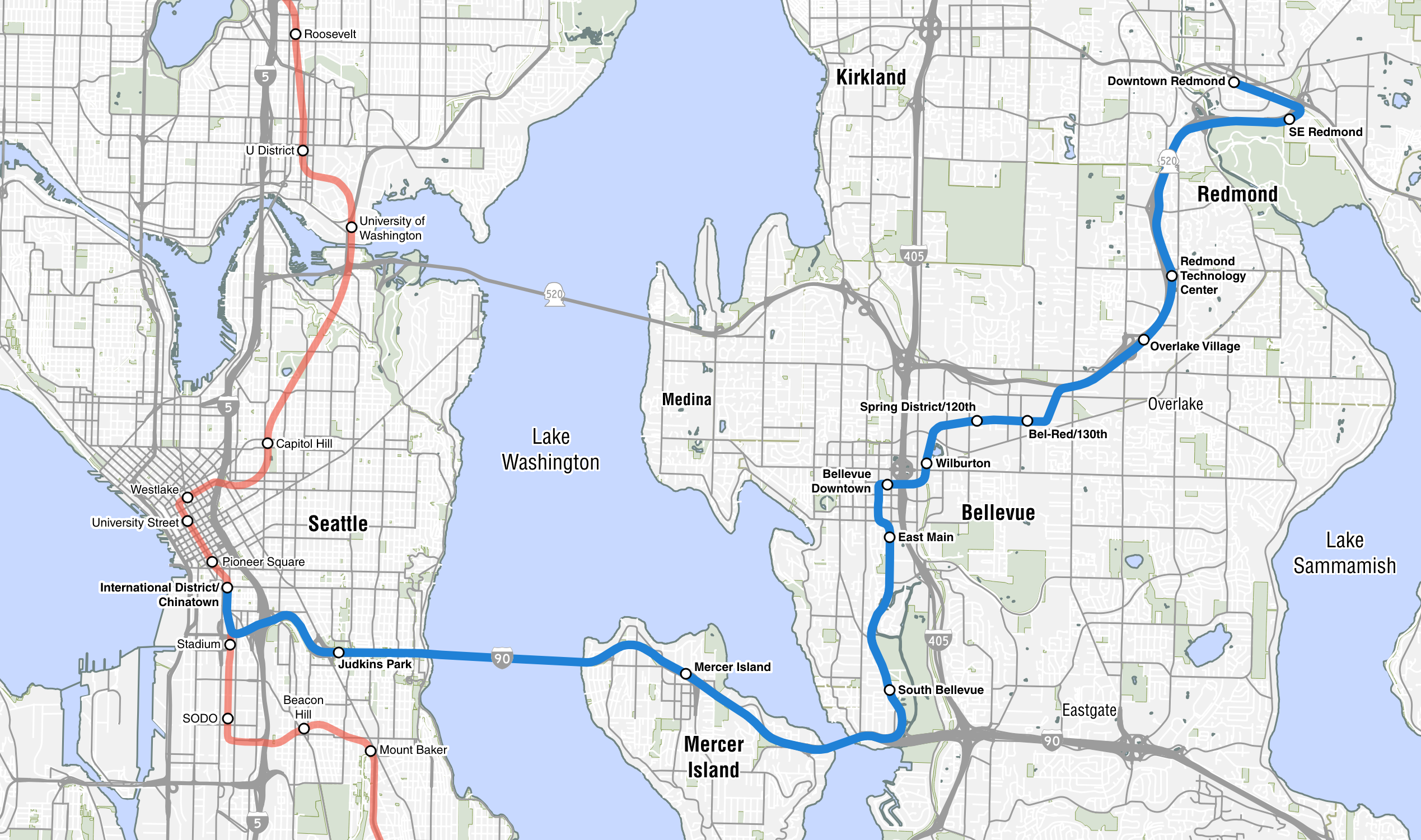
Map of East Link and its stations

The 2 Line is 33 miles (53 km) long and serves a total of 25 stations, of which 13 are shared with the 1 Line. It diverges from the 1 Line at International District/Chinatown station, located near the end of the Downtown Seattle Transit Tunnel. The tracks ascend on an existing ramp, formerly used by buses leaving the tunnel, and turn east to follow Interstate 90 over Interstate 5. The line uses the freeway's former express lanes, which weave under the westbound lanes and onto the roadway's median as I-90 passes around the north side of Beacon Hill. The 2 Line then stops at Judkins Park station near the freeway's interchange with Rainier Avenue before entering the Mount Baker Tunnel. The tracks travel onto the Homer M. Hadley Memorial Bridge, a floating bridge that was renovated to accommodate light rail, towards Mercer Island. On the island, the 2 Line travels under Aubrey Davis Park and stops at a station at the center of the city's central business district. After traversing the East Channel Bridge, the light rail tracks leave I-90 and cross over to the east side of Bellevue Way, traveling north on an elevated guideway through South Bellevue station. The tracks descend into a trench running along the west edge of Mercer Slough Nature Park, with lids near the historic Frederick W. Winters House and other intersections. The 2 Line then turns northeastward to follow 112th Avenue Southeast, crossing under the street to its west side near Surrey Downs Park, and stops at East Main station before turning sharply westward into a tunnel. The 1,985-foot-long (605 m) tunnel travels under 110th Avenue Northeast in Downtown Bellevue and makes a sharp turn to the east at Bellevue Downtown station, adjacent to Bellevue Transit Center at the eastern edge of Downtown Bellevue.

The tracks continue onto an elevated viaduct that travels over Interstate 405 and turn north over the Eastside Rail Corridor. Trains reach Wilburton station, on the north side of Northeast 8th Street, and follow the Eastside Rail Corridor while descending to ground level near Lake Bellevue. At Northeast 12th Street, the tracks turn east, while the Eastside Rail Corridor continues north along another set of tracks leading to Link's East operations and maintenance facility. Trains continue into a trench with a station at 120th Avenue, in the center of the Spring District development. The tracks cross over Kelsey Creek and return to street level at BelRed station, traveling northeast in the median of Northeast Spring Boulevard and 136th Place Northeast. After crossing Northeast 20th Street, trains ascend onto an elevated guideway that follows the south side of State Route 520, crossing over the 148th Avenue Northeast interchange and stopping at Overlake Village station. The 2 Line then descends to ground level and turns north along the freeway and approaches its initial terminus at Redmond Technology station, located at Northeast 40th Street on the Microsoft Redmond campus. The Downtown Redmond Extension continues along State Route 520 towards downtown Redmond, stopping at a station northeast of Marymoor Park. The extension then turns west, crossing under the freeway, and terminates at Downtown Redmond station near the intersection of Cleveland Street and 166th Avenue Northeast.

=== Stations ===
List of 2 Line stations
Code	Station	City	Type	Image	Opened (Note: Reflects the date that 2 Line service began; some stations opened at earlier dates for other services.)	Connections and notes
40	Lynnwood City Center	Lynnwood	Elevated	Western side of Lynnwood City Center Station on opening day with vendor booths and crowds in the foreground.	February 14, 2026	Connects with the 1 Line; Park and ride: 1,896 stalls Connects with Swift Blue Line and Swift Orange Line
41	Mountlake Terrace	Mountlake Terrace	Elevated	Western side of Mountlake Terrace Station with a train in the foreground.	February 14, 2026	Connects with the 1 Line; Park and ride: 870 stalls
42	Shoreline North/185th	Shoreline	At-grade	Shoreline North/185th Station from the south side on opening day	February 14, 2026	Connects with the 1 Line; Park and ride: 494 stalls Connects with Swift Blue Line
43	Shoreline South/148th	Shoreline	Elevated	Shoreline South/148th Station platforms viewed from the elevated parking garage	February 14, 2026	Connects with the 1 Line; Park and ride: 500 stalls
44	Pinehurst	Seattle	Elevated	South entrance of Pinehurst Station	September 30, 2026	Connects with the 1 Line
45	Northgate	Seattle	Elevated	Western side of Northgate station on opening day	February 14, 2026	Connects with the 1 Line; Park and ride: 1,380 stalls
46	Roosevelt	Seattle	Underground	Entrance to Roosevelt station	February 14, 2026	Connects with the 1 Line
47	U District	Seattle	Underground	Platform level at U District station	February 14, 2026	Connects with the 1 Line
48	University of Washington	Seattle	Underground	Entrance to University of Washington station	February 14, 2026	Connects with the 1 Line
49	Capitol Hill	Seattle	Underground	Platform at Capitol Hill station	February 14, 2026	Connects with the 1 Line; Connects with First Hill Streetcar
50	Westlake	Seattle	Underground	Light rail train arriving at Westlake station's platform	February 14, 2026	Connects with the 1 Line; Connects with Seattle Center Monorail and South Lake Union Streetcar
51	Symphony	Seattle	Underground	Metro bus and light rail train at Symphony station	February 14, 2026	Connects with the 1 Line
52	Pioneer Square	Seattle	Underground	Light rail train at Pioneer Square station	February 14, 2026	Connects with the 1 Line; Connects with Washington State Ferries, King County Water Taxi, and Kitsap Fast Ferries
53	International District/Chinatown	Seattle	Underground	Light rail train and bus at International District/Chinatown station	February 14, 2026	Connects with the 1 Line; Connects with Amtrak, Sounder commuter rail, and First Hill Streetcar
54	Judkins Park	Seattle	Surface	Judkins Park station platform shortly before its opening in March 2026.	March 28, 2026	
55	Mercer Island	Mercer Island	Retained cut	Mercer Island station west entrance under construction in 2022.	March 28, 2026	Park and ride: 447 stalls
56	South Bellevue	Bellevue	Elevated	South Bellevue station shortly after opening in April 2024. The modern light rail station has a colorful mural and a train passing overhead.	April 27, 2024	Park and ride: 1,500 stalls
57	East Main	Bellevue	Surface	A modern light rail train, mostly white with blue accents, is stopped at the eastbound platform at East Main station in May 2024. The station has two platforms on the sides of the station with two tracks running down the center. Behind the train, there's a station with a covered platform and some greenery. The sky is clear and blue.	April 27, 2024	
58	Bellevue Downtown	Bellevue	Retained cut	Two modern light rail trains on the opposite side platforms of Bellevue Downtown station on opening day, April 27, 2024. The station has two platforms on the sides of the station with two tracks running down the center. The platforms are crowded with excited people taking photos of the trains. The sky is cloudy and gray.	April 27, 2024	Connects with RapidRide B Line
59	Wilburton	Bellevue	Elevated	The elevated Wilburton station under construction in August 2022. The station has a concrete platform and a glass-enclosed waiting area. The station is surrounded by a chain-link fence and there's a parking lot nearby. The sky is clear and blue.	April 27, 2024	Connects with RapidRide B Line
60	Spring District	Bellevue	Retained cut	The below ground Spring District station on opening weekend in April 2024. The station has a high ceiling with exposed beams and bright lights. The station has two platforms on the sides of the station with two tracks running down the center. There are benches along the platform for passengers to wait. The walls are decorated with artwork, and there are signs with information about the station and train schedules.	April 27, 2024	
61	BelRed	Bellevue	Surface	BelRed station on opening weekend in April 2024. The station has two platforms on the sides of the station with two tracks running down the center. There are shelters with glass walls and roofs along the platform, providing protection from the weather. The platform is made of concrete and has yellow lines and railings. There are benches for passengers to wait, and there are signs with information about the station and train schedules. The sky is cloudy, and there are puddles on the track bed.	April 27, 2024	Park and ride: 300 stalls
62	Overlake Village	Redmond	Surface	Overlake Village station on opening weekend in April 2024. The station has two platforms on the sides of the station with two tracks running down the center. A modern white with blue accents is stopped between the platforms. Each platform has a covered waiting area and a sign indicating the direction of travel. There are overhead wires. The sky is cloudy and there are trees in the background.	April 27, 2024	
63	Redmond Technology	Redmond	Surface	Redmond Technology station on opening weekend in April 2024. The station has an island platform between two tracks. There is a train at the platform. The platform is covered and is located next to a large parking garage. The train is white with blue accents and has a curved front.	April 27, 2024	Park and ride: 300 stalls Connects with RapidRide B Line
64	Marymoor Village	Redmond	Surface	A three-car train is parked at a station with a narrow center platform that is partially covered by a roof. A large crowd of people can be seen on the platform and in an adjacent area with several tents.	May 10, 2025	Park and ride: 1,400 stalls
65	Downtown Redmond	Redmond	Elevated	A train station entrance with a large sign reading "Downtown Redmond Station" mounted on a canopy. The entrance has large glass windows and is seen next to several scooters and bicycles.	May 10, 2025	Connects with RapidRide B Line

== Service ==
The 2 Line operates for 20 hours a day on weekdays and Saturdays, from approximately 4:30 a.m. to 12:30 a.m., and over 18 hours on Sundays and federal holidays, from approximately 5:30 a.m. to 12:00 a.m. During regular weekday service, trains operate roughly every eight minutes during rush hour, every ten minutes during the middle of the day, and every twelve to fifteen minutes in the early morning and at night. Trains operate every ten minutes on weekends. The Lynnwood–Seattle section, shared with the 1 Line, operates with a combined frequency of four minutes at peak and five minutes off-peak.

End-to-end travel from Lynnwood City Center station to Downtown Redmond station takes approximately 77 minutes, while trips between Downtown Seattle and Downtown Bellevue take 22 minutes. The 2 Line uses three-car trainsets during rush hours and event service and two-car sets at other times. The 2011 final environmental impact statement had initially assumed three-car operations with a headway of eight minutes during peak, twelve minutes during the day on weekdays and weekends, and fifteen minutes during early morning and late evening service. Route 547, a night bus operated by Sound Transit stops at select 2 Line stops between Downtown Seattle and Redmond with service every 30 minutes from 12:00 a.m. to 4:30 p.m. on weekdays and Saturdays and from 11:30 p.m. to 5:20 a.m. on Sundays.

The 2 Line carried over 2 million total passengers in 2025, with an average of 6,511 riders on weekdays. As of July 2025, a daily average of 10,782 passengers boarded trains on the 2 Line; in June 2024, the line had 6,668 daily passengers. 2 Line trains are anticipated to carry 50,000 daily passengers by 2030.

=== Future plans ===
The 2 Line is planned to be extended to the Mariner area of Everett by 2037, while 3 Line trains (replacing the 1 Line) would continue on to Downtown Everett. Sound Transit plans to expand light rail service to Kirkland and Issaquah by 2044, as part of the Sound Transit 3 program. The preliminary design for the 4 Line includes tracks shared with East Link through Downtown Bellevue, between East Main and Wilburton stations.
