= Spring District =

Mixed-use development in Bellevue, Washington, U.S.

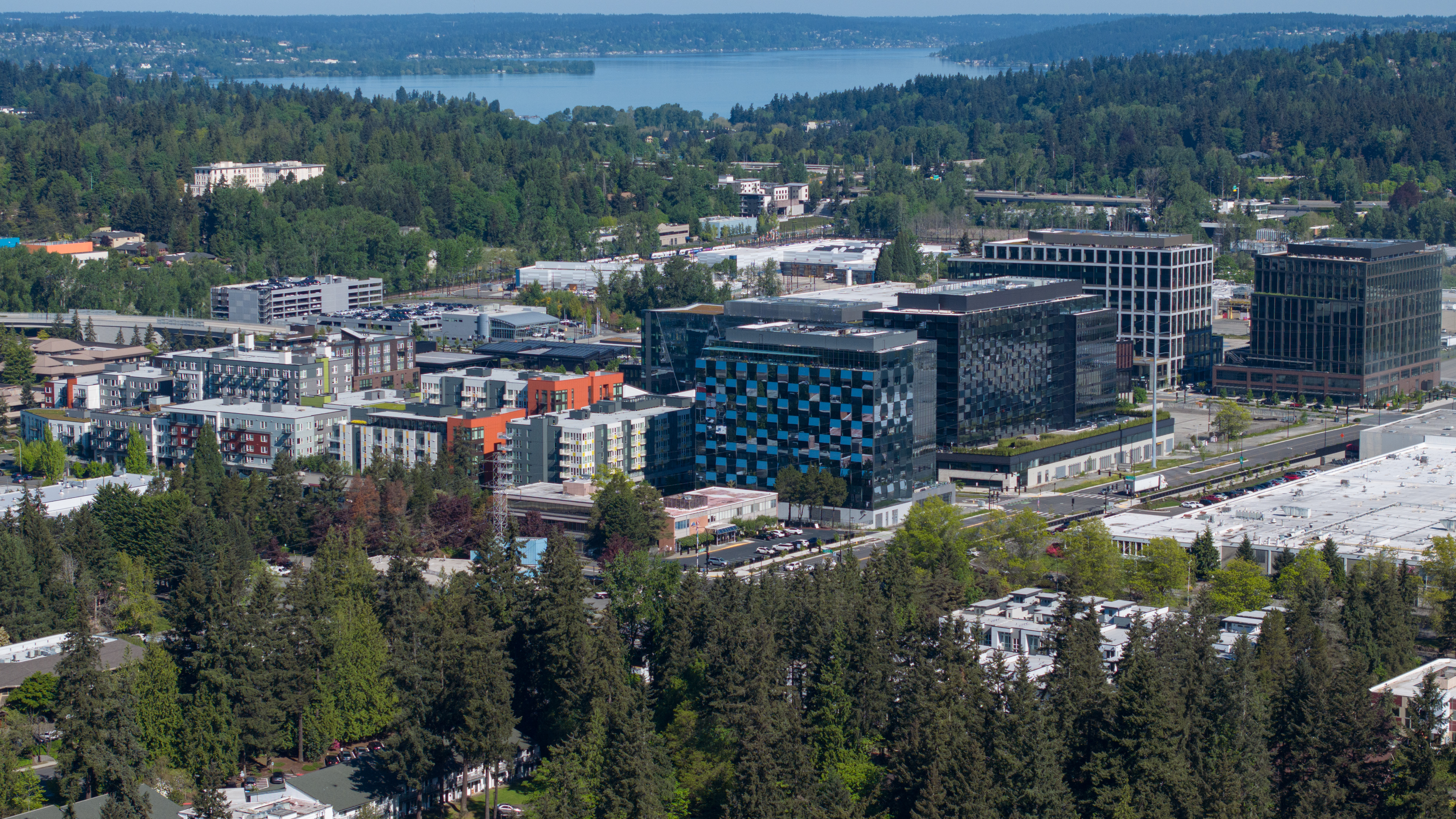
- Aerial view of Spring District
- Interactive map of Spring District
- Location: Bellevue, Washington
- Coordinates: 47.6227°N 122.1772°W
- Status: Under construction
- Groundbreaking: September 16, 2013
- Constructed: 2015 onwards
- Estimated completion: 2017 to 2028
- Use: Mixed-use development (office and housing)
- Website: thespringdistrict.com

Companies
- Architect: NBBJ, GGLO
- Developer: Wright Runstad & Company
- Owner: Security Properties, AMLI Residential
- Manager: Shorenstein Properties

Technical details
- Cost: $2.3 billion
- Buildings: 24
- Size: 36 acres (15 ha)
- Leasable area: 5.3 million square feet (490,000 m^{2})
- No. of residents: 2,000
- No. of workers: 13,000

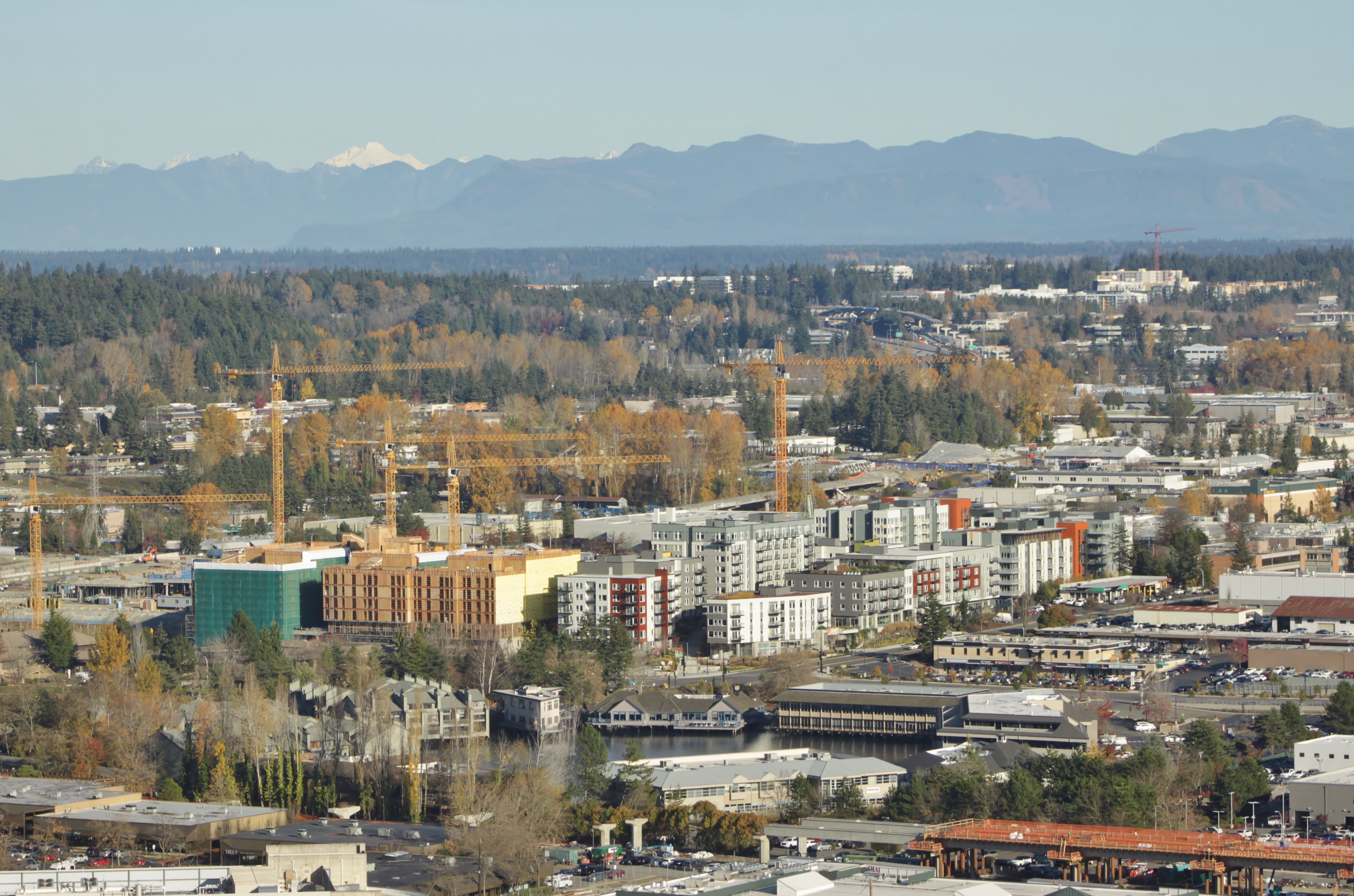
Spring District as seen from Downtown Bellevue in 2018

The Spring District is a transit-oriented development and neighborhood that is under construction in Bellevue, Washington. The 16-block, 36-acre (15 ha) development is centered around the Spring District station on the East Link Extension, a light rail line in the Link light rail system. It is located in the Bel-Red area between Downtown Bellevue and Redmond, currently used for light industry, roughly bounded on the west by 120th Avenue NE and the Eastside Rail Corridor rail trail, on the north by a King County Metro bus base, on the east by 124th Avenue NE, and on the south by NE 12th Street.

The Spring District is being developed by Wright Runstad & Company in a joint venture with Shorenstein Properties. NBBJ is the project's master plan architect, though individual buildings developed by Security Properties and AMLI Residential are being designed by GGLO. Plans for the neighborhood were drawn up in the late 2000s and allowed after a 2009 upzone of the Bel-Red corridor. Demolition of a former distribution center on the site began in September 2013. Construction of the first phase, consisting of two apartment buildings, began in June 2015 and finished in 2017. The full development is anticipated to be completed by 2028, adding 5.3 million square feet (490,000 m^{2}) of housing, office space and retail to the area.

Two major office tenants have confirmed their intent to occupy space in the Spring District: Meta (formerly Facebook) and the Global Innovation Exchange, an educational institute formed from a partnership between the University of Washington, Microsoft and Tsinghua University. In 2016, the Puget Sound Business Journal ranked the $2.3 billion project as the second-largest construction project in the Puget Sound region, behind the East Link light rail extension.

== History ==
=== Background ===
The Bel-Red area (named for its location along Bel-Red Road between the city centers of Bellevue and Redmond) was originally developed in the 1960s for light industry, such as warehouses, as well as some pockets of commercial and office development. The 900-acre (360 ha) area accounts for more than a quarter of Bellevue's industrial land.

In 2005, with businesses moving out of the area, the city government began a planning study that reexamined existing zoning in the Bel-Red area, with considerations to future residential units and retail lots, in an attempt to direct growth. The Bel-Red area was selected in part due to plans for a light rail line through the area on the way to the Microsoft campus in Overlake near Redmond. The plan for light rail was approved by voters in 2008 as part of Sound Transit's East Link Extension and finalized in 2011 with two stops in the Bel-Red area at 120th Avenue and 130th Avenue. The Bellevue City Council adopted a rezone of the Bel-Red area in 2009, allowing for buildings up to 13 stories tall, approximately 150 feet (46 m), as well as mixed-use development incorporating residential units and retail.

=== Spring District plans ===
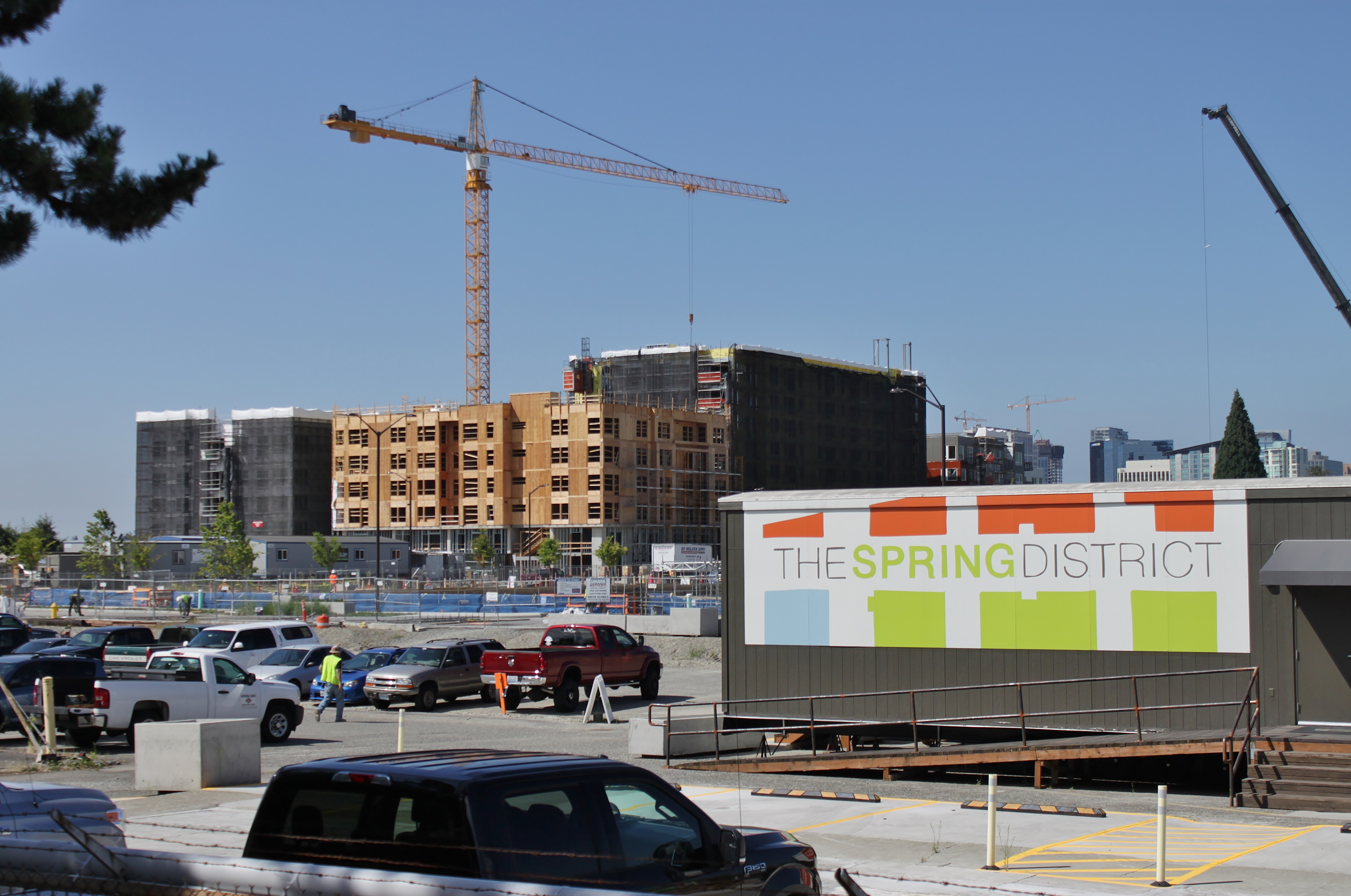
Phase I construction in August 2016

In December 2007, Seattle-based real estate developer Wright Runstad unveiled plans for a transit-oriented urban village named the "Spring District" to be located in the Bel-Red industrial area. The firm had, together with Shorenstein Properties, bought a 36-acre (15 ha) lot in the Bel-Red area in May 2007 for $68 million; the land was formerly owned by Safeway, who had a distribution center for its supermarkets at the site. The first phase of the project was to be completed in 2010, pending zoning changes approved by the city, and replace existing warehouses and light industry with 1,000 residences and 3 million square feet (280,000 m^{2}) of offices along with 16 acres (6.5 ha) of open space.

A master plan for the Spring District was unveiled by NBBJ in 2008, taking inspiration from the Pearl District in Portland, Oregon, and was approved by the City of Bellevue in 2012.

In March 2013, it was announced that Security Properties would develop the first phase of the Spring District, beginning with a five apartment buildings with 316 units. A second developer, AMLI Residential, announced its intention to purchase a 1.47-acre (0.59 ha) parcel in the Spring District for $13.3 million; AMLI built a 204-unit apartment building on its site that opened in 2020.

=== Opposition and controversy ===
The development of the Spring District, and its use of public funding to build roads and a light rail station to serve it, was opposed by Downtown Bellevue real estate developer Kemper Freeman. Freeman funded the campaigns of a set of Bellevue City Council candidates in the 2011 elections, while Spring District developer Wright Runstad funded a set of opposing candidates. Freeman had filed an appeal with the city prior to the election, arguing that the environmental impact of additional automobile traffic generated by the Spring District would require further study than the current master plan. It was settled in 2012, with the city requiring a future study of traffic impacts in exchange for the withdrawal of the appeal.

Sound Transit's decision to build a light rail operations and maintenance facility adjacent to the Spring District was opposed by Wright Runstad, who argued that the facility would be damaging to the developer's vision and plans for the area.

Bellevue's abandonment of plans for low-income housing in the district, allowing Wright Runstad to pay into a development fund instead, was criticized in a piece on Crosscut.com as part of trend with private developers shying away from building affordable housing around transit.

=== Construction ===
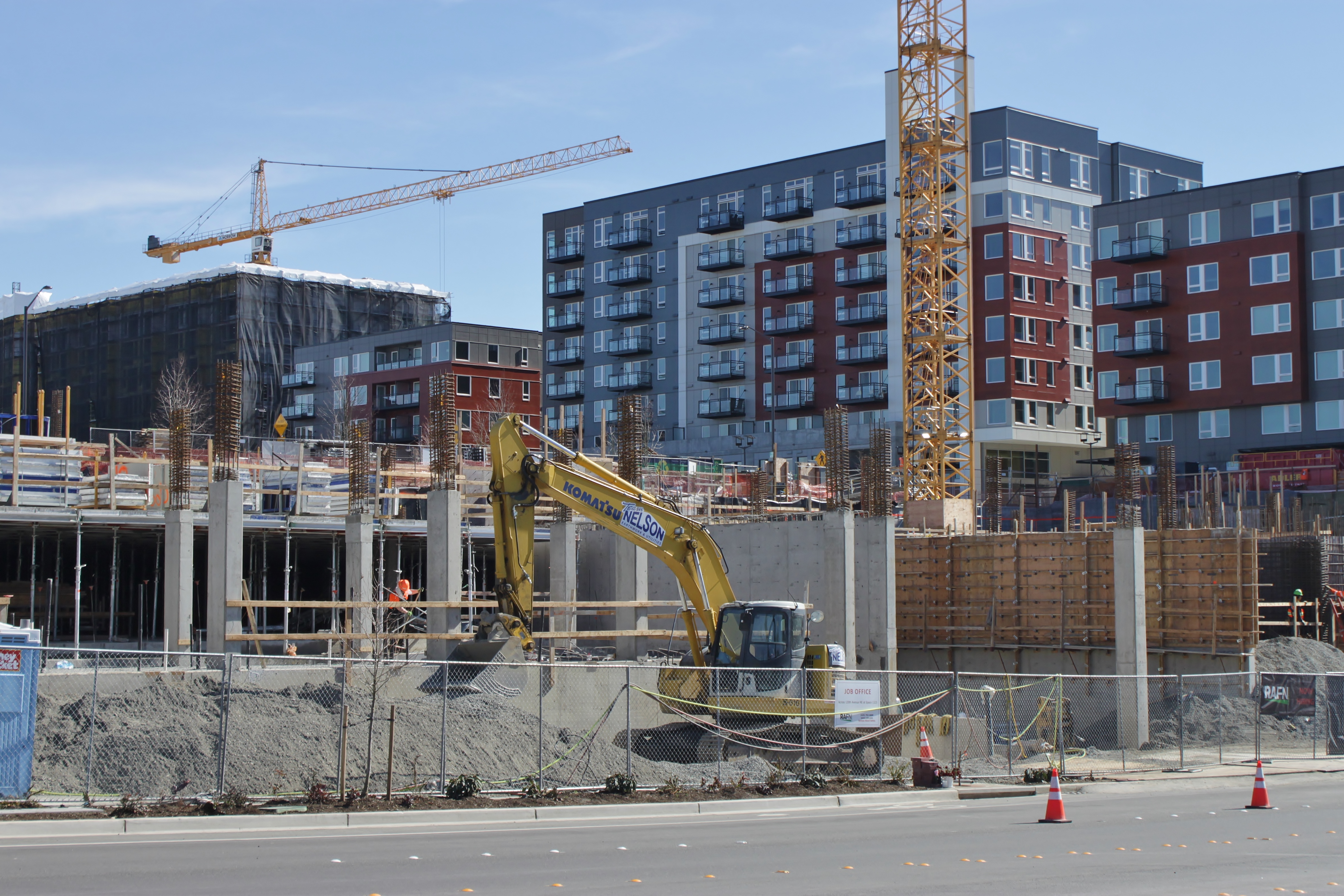
Completed Phase I and in-progress Phase II buildings seen in March 2018

A groundbreaking ceremony was held on September 16, 2013, to celebrate the start of site demolition at the future Spring District. Demolition of the Safeway distribution center was completed in January 2014, and construction of the first phase, a 79-unit apartment building, began in June 2015. Construction of all five buildings in the first phase will be finished in 2017. The second phase began construction in November 2016.

Construction of the Spring District is expected to last 15 years, ending by 2028, and be divided into three phases. The first phase will open from 2017 to 2022 and primarily consist of residential buildings and office spaces on the southernmost and easternmost blocks; the second phase will open from 2019 to 2022 and primarily consist of commercial space in the centrally located blocks; the third phase will open from 2022 to 2026 and include residential and commercial buildings as well as a hotel adjacent to the light rail station on the north end of the site.

== Design and features ==
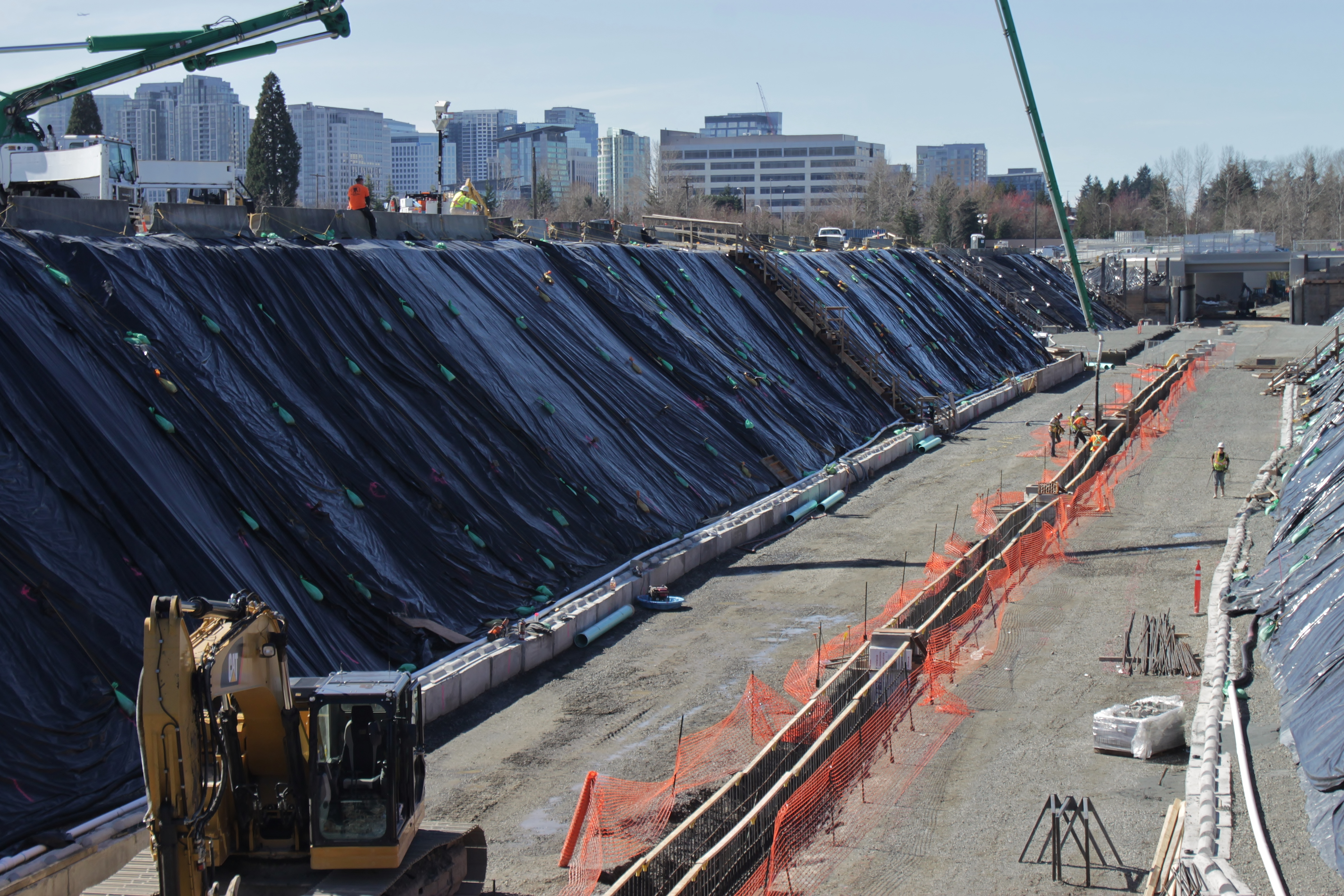
The future Spring District light rail station, seen under construction in 2018

The Spring District is centered around a light rail station located in the northern part of the planned neighborhood. Architecture firm NBBJ, inspired by the Pearl District in Portland, Oregon, designed the neighborhood with small blocks and a grid of interconnected streets integrated with the station and amenities, including parks, open space and mid-block pedestrian passages. The buildings will be staggered and oriented for views of Downtown Bellevue to the southwest and the Cascade Range to the east. NE 16th Street will be renamed to Spring Boulevard, which begins in the new district and continues east towards Overlake Village station.

Part of the development will cross Kelsey Creek tributaries in the area, as well as three other creeks. The city has termed the creeks and wetlands "unhealthy" and has planned mitigation measures.

The Spring District was the recipient of a Leadership in Energy and Environmental Design (LEED) certification for neighborhood development in 2022. It was recognized for promoting alternative modes of transportation and incorporating habitat-friendly water features.

== Buildings and tenants ==
The Spring District is planned to consist of 24 buildings on 36 acres (15 ha) of land, totaling 5.3 million square feet (490,000 m^{2}) of leasable space. As a mixed-use development, the buildings are split between residential, commercial, and retail uses. The Spring District is expected to include over 3 million square feet (280,000 m^{2}) of office space and 1,500 residential units. City of Bellevue zoning allows for buildings as tall as 150 feet (46 m), though buildings range from 3 to 12 stories. At full build out, the development will support an estimated 2,000 residents and 13,000 office workers.

The first residential building opened in May 2017. The Global Innovation Exchange, a high-tech academic institute supported by the University of Washington, Microsoft, and Tsinghua University, was announced as the first major tenant for the Spring District in 2015. It opened in September 2017, with 43 students from China and the United States taking master's degree courses. The facility was expected to have 3,000 students in various programs by 2027.

Outdoor supplier REI announced in March 2016 that it intended to relocate its Kent headquarters to the Spring District by 2020. The company announced in August 2020 that it would sell the headquarters building and 8-acre (3.2 ha) campus within the Spring District due to the surge in remote working amid the COVID-19 pandemic. Facebook (now Meta) announced its purchase of the unfinished campus the following month for $368 million, while an undeveloped 2-acre (0.81 ha) lot was sold back to Wright Runstad. The 11-story Meta offices at Block 16 opened in October 2022; the company expanded into Block 20 (the former REI building) and Block 24 by the end of the year. As of 2024, Meta occupied nine buildings in the Spring District and planned to sublease several commercial and retail spaces that had remained unleased. The company also had options to develop buildings on five other blocks that it relinquished in October 2025; one of the sites has been proposed for a new apartment building.
