= Spring District station =

Light rail station in Bellevue, Washington

60 Spring District
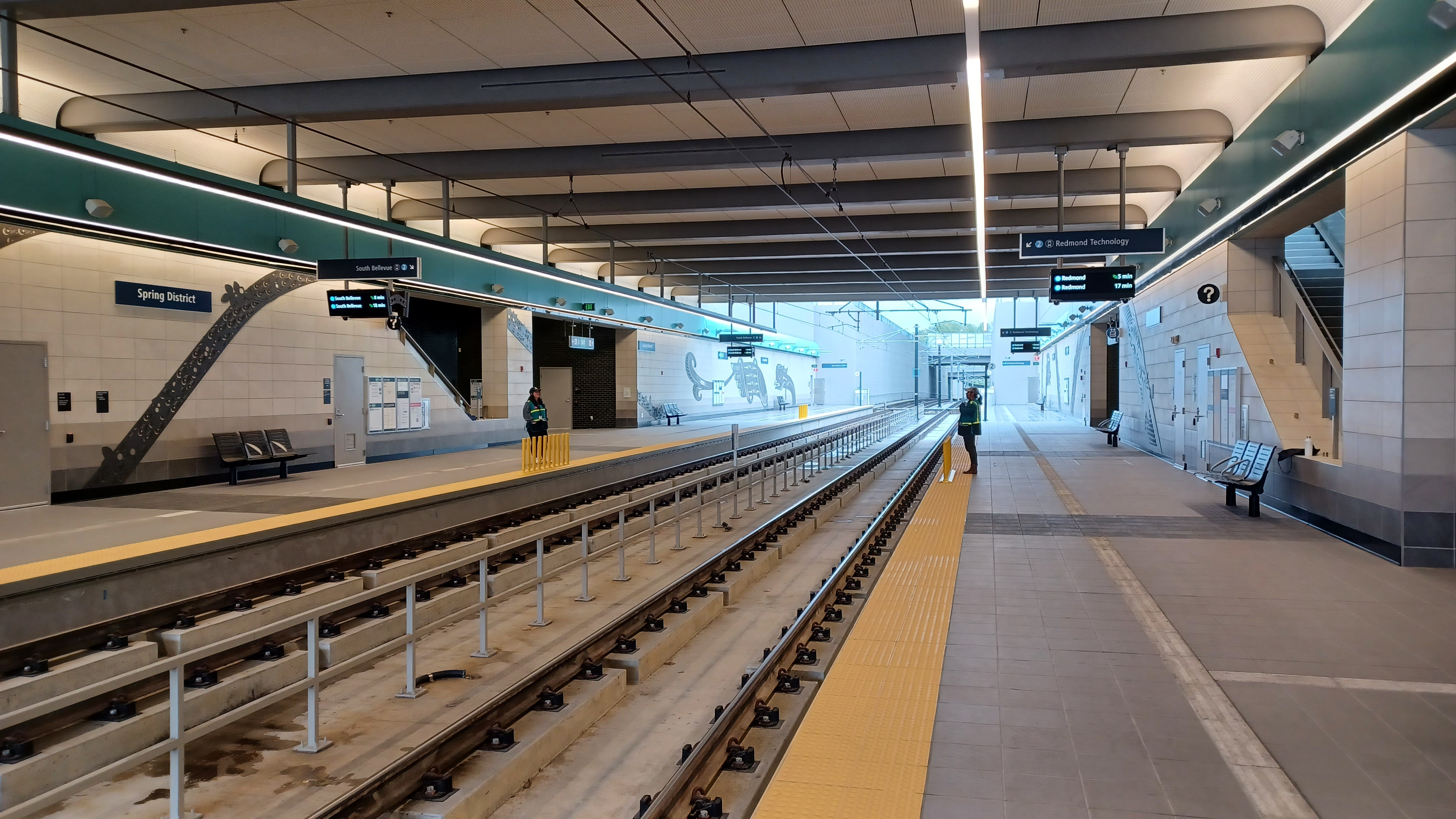
- Spring District station platforms

General information
- Location: 12164 Northeast Spring Boulevard; Bellevue, Washington; United States
- Coordinates: 47°37′25″N 122°10′43″W
- System: Link light rail
- Owner: Sound Transit
- Platforms: 2 side platforms
- Tracks: 2

Construction
- Structure type: Below-grade
- Accessible: Yes

History
- Opened: April 27, 2024

Passengers
- 637 daily weekday boardings (2025); 178,096 total boardings (2025)

Services
Preceding station	Sound Transit	Following station
Link
Wilburton toward Lynnwood City Center	2 Line	BelRed toward Downtown Redmond
Location

Spring District station is a Link light rail station in Bellevue, Washington, United States. It is a retained cut station on the 2 Line and serves the Spring District neighborhood, a transit-oriented development in Bellevue. It opened on April 27, 2024 as part of the 2 Line's initial segment.

== Location ==
Spring District station is located between 120th and 124th avenues in the Spring District neighborhood of Bellevue.

== History ==
The station was originally named Spring District/120th in June 2015. The name was shortened to Spring District station in October 2023 following a request from the Bellevue city government. The 2 Line opened on April 27, 2024; as part of the opening festivities, the station hosted food trucks and live music sponsored primarily by Meta and Spring District developer Wright Runstad.

== Design ==
The station, designed by LMN Architects, was built in a trench that places the platforms under street level. To the west of the station, a wye junction enables access to an operations and maintenance facility for Link trains.
