= Frederick W. Winters House =

Historic house in Washington, United States

- U.S. National Register of Historic Places
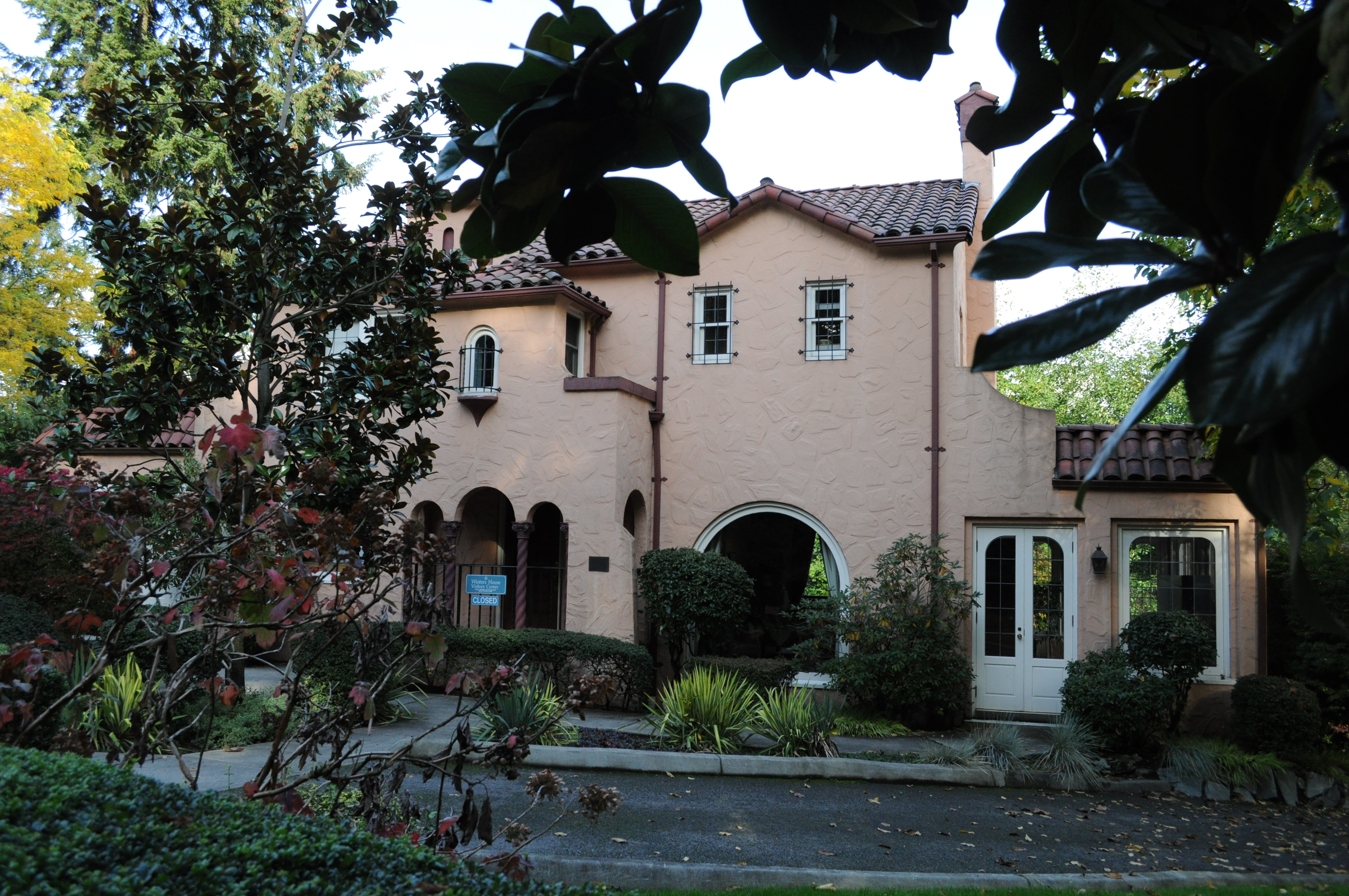

- Location within Washington (state) Location within the United States
- Location: 2102 Bellevue Way SE; Bellevue, Washington
- Coordinates: 47°35′30″N 122°11′36″W
- Area: less than one acre
- Built: 1929
- Architectural style: Mission Revival
- NRHP reference No.: 92000367
- Added to NRHP: April 21, 1992

The Frederick W. Winters House in Bellevue, Washington, United States, was built in 1929 in Mission Revival style. It was listed on the National Register of Historic Places in 1992 and is the only nationally designated property in the city of Bellevue. The building is owned by the City of Bellevue and was closed in 2016 for light rail construction along Bellevue Way.

== History ==
Frederick and Cecilia Winters settled in the Bellevue area in 1916, purchasing a small holly farm and later a 10-acre (4.0 ha) farm by the Mercer Slough. The Winters raised azaleas for sale in the Midwest and East Coast in several greenhouses on the property, which was expanded by 10 acres (4.0 ha) in the early 1920s to support bulb farming. Frederick Winters raised narcissus, Dutch irises, and Spanish irises, profiting from the national quarantine of imported bulbs that was in place from 1926 to 1938.

The Winters constructed their third home in 1929, on a site one mile (1.6 km) north of their bulb farm and at a cost of $32,000. Cecilia's brother Elmer H. Roedel designed the two-story home using a mix of the popular Spanish Eclectic and Mission Revival styles, based on his own home in Portland, Oregon. By the early 1930s, the Winters farm included several additional bulb houses, private residences for guests, workers' quarters, and eight greenhouses. Further expansion of the Winters farm was stalled by boggy ground in the slough and the family gradually sold off their land holdings during the late 1930s. The Winters relocated to Kent and sold the house and bulb house to Austrian immigrants Anna and Frank Riepl in 1943 for $40,000. The Riepls built several new structures on the property but made few substantial changes to the main house. It was rented out to various tenants, one of whom shot and wounded Anna Riepl in 1962. Anna Riepl sold the house in 1980 for $330,000, but continued to live in the dilapidated home until she was forcibly removed by a court-appointed guardian three years later.

The City of Bellevue purchased the 14-acre (5.7 ha) property in 1988 for $1.7 million, using a county open space ballot measure, and began an extensive renovation in 1990 at the behest of the Bellevue Historical Society. The renovations cost $335,623 and included the addition of an interpretive center and trailhead for the Mercer Slough trail. The Winters House was added to the National Register of Historic Places in 1992 and re-opened to visitors in June 1994. The Bellevue Historical Society, later merged into the Eastside Heritage Center, moved into the renovated mansion with antique furniture donated by Bellevue residents and businesses. One of the items, an authentic 1930s telephone, plays a simulated conversation between Cecilia Winters and her neighbor as part of the museum's programming.

The building was closed in 2016 for construction of the East Link Extension light rail project along Bellevue Way. Light rail trains pass 9 feet (2.7 m) in front of the Winters House in a trench along Bellevue Way, which has a lid to dampen noise serving as the house's front yard.
