= BelRed station =

Light rail station in Bellevue, Washington

61 BelRed
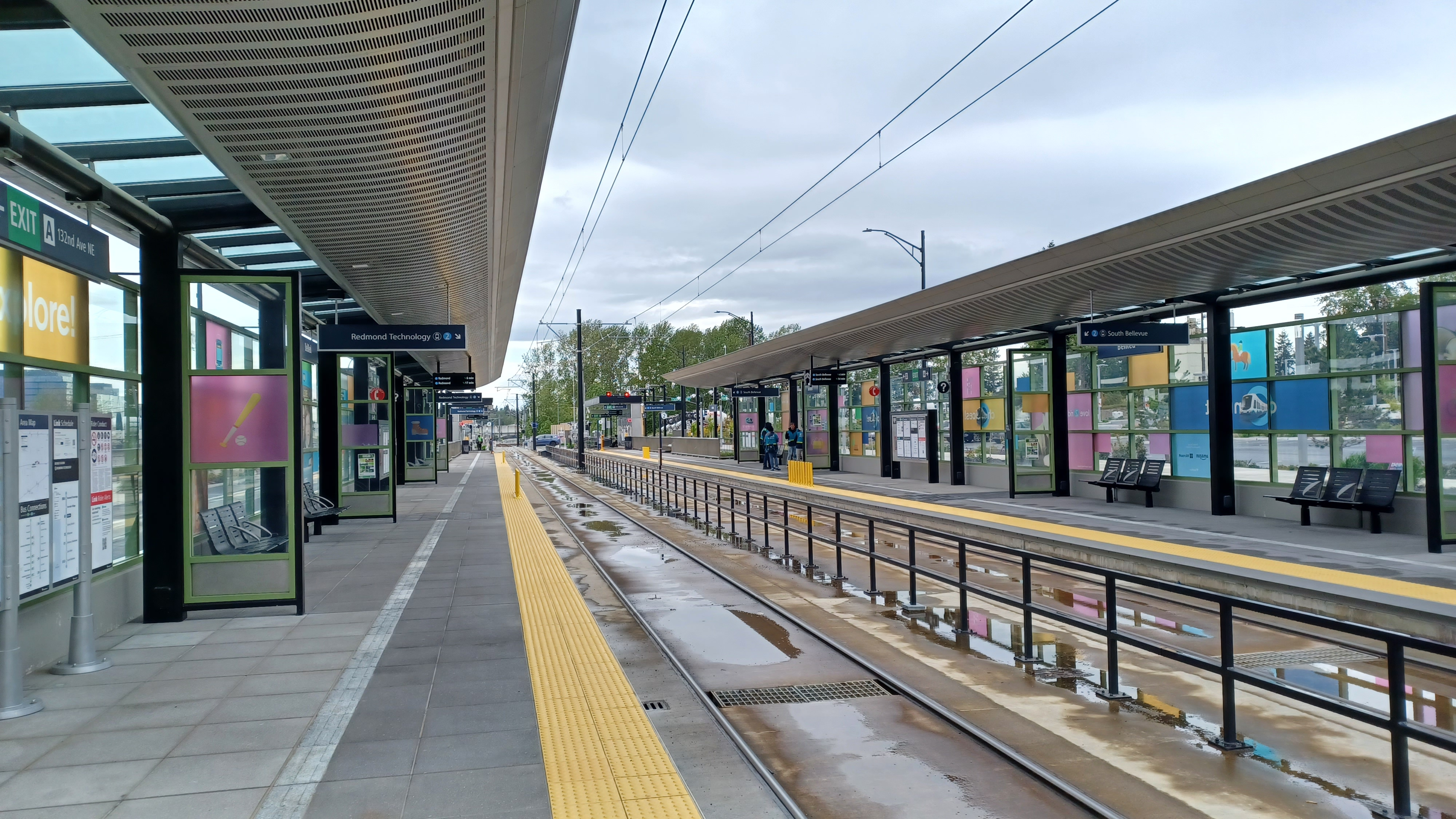
- Westbound platform at BelRed station

General information
- Location: 13102 Northeast Spring Boulevard; Bellevue, Washington; United States
- Coordinates: 47°37′28″N 122°09′57″W
- System: Link light rail
- Owner: Sound Transit
- Platforms: 2 side platforms
- Tracks: 2

Construction
- Structure type: At-grade
- Accessible: Yes

History
- Opened: April 27, 2024

Passengers
- 461 daily weekday boardings (2025); 140,443 total boardings (2025)

Services
| Preceding station | Sound Transit | Following station |
Link
| Spring District toward Lynnwood City Center | 2 Line | Overlake Village toward Downtown Redmond |
Location

BelRed station is an at-grade Link light rail station in the Bel-Red area of Bellevue, Washington. It opened on April 27, 2024, as part of the 2 Line, which serves several Eastside communities.

== Location ==
The station is located on NE 16th Street between 130th and 132nd avenues in northeastern Bellevue. A 300-stall park and ride lot is adjacent to the station.

== History ==
The station was originally named Bel-Red/130th in June 2015. The name was shortened to BelRed station in October 2023 following a request from the Bellevue city government. It opened on April 27, 2024, as part of the initial section of the 2 Line.

== Station layout ==
The station consists of two side platforms situated at-grade in the median of Spring Boulevard.

An early design proposed by Tiscareno Associates using rusted steel for the shelters, reflecting the area's industrial history, but was rejected by community members. The revised design takes inspiration from nearby water features. In February 2017, Sound Transit awarded a $93 million construction contract for the station and nearby bridge to the Max J. Kuney Company.
