= RapidRide B Line =

Bus rapid transit route in King County, Washington

B Line

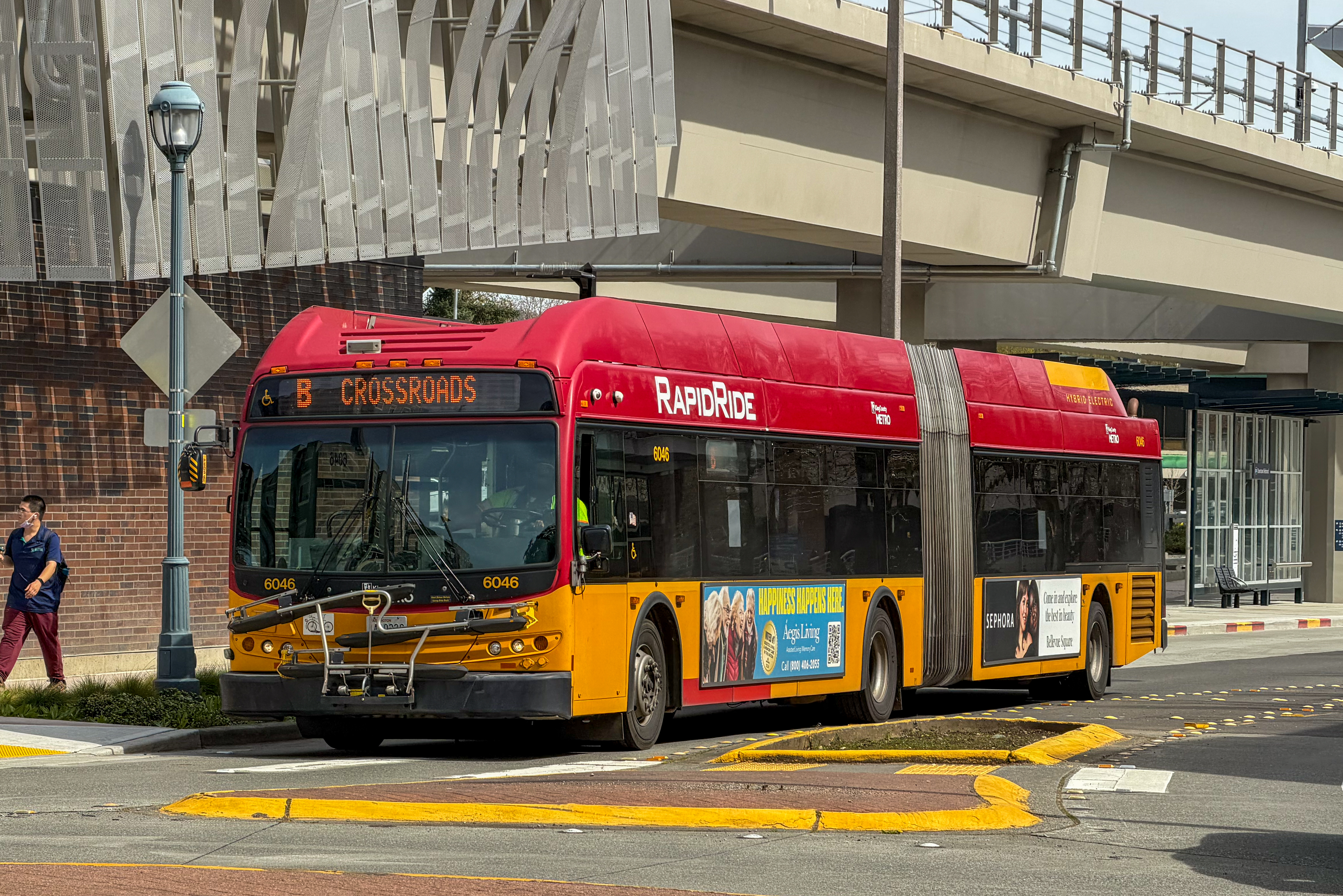
- B Line bus in Redmond

Overview
- System: RapidRide
- Operator: King County Metro
- Garage: East Base
- Vehicle: New Flyer articulated buses
- Began service: October 1, 2011
- Predecessors: Route 230, 253

Route
- Locale: King County
- Communities served: Redmond, Overlake, Bellevue
- Start: Downtown Redmond station
- Via: NE 90th St; 148th Ave NE; NE 40th St; 156th Ave NE; NE 8th St
- End: Bellevue Transit Center
- Length: 10 miles (16 km)

Service
- Frequency: Peak: 10 minutes Off-peak: 15 minutes Early morning & night: 30 minutes
- Weekend frequency: 15 minutes (most times)
- Journey time: 50 minutes
- Operates: Weekdays: 4:21 am-12:25 am Weekends: 6:00 am-12:25 am
- Ridership: 6,600 (weekday average, spring 2015)
- Timetable: B Line timetable
- Map: B Line map

The B Line is one of eight RapidRide lines (routes with some bus rapid transit features) operated by King County Metro in King County, Washington. The B Line began service on October 1, 2011, running between downtown Redmond, Overlake and downtown Bellevue. The line runs mainly via NE 8th Street, 156th Avenue NE, NE 40th Street and 148th Avenue NE. Unlike most of the RapidRide lines, the B Line does not offer scheduled service during late-night and early morning hours.

== History ==
This corridor was previously served Metro routes 230 and 253 which carried a combined average of 5,070 riders on weekdays during the last month in service. Since the implementation of RapidRide on the corridor, ridership has grown 30 percent and the B Line served an average of 6,600 riders on weekdays in spring 2015. On May 10, 2025, the line was realigned to no longer serve Overlake Village station and extended to Downtown Redmond station.

== Service ==
Headways
Time	Monday-Friday	Weekend/Holidays
4:21 am – 6:00 am	15-30	No Service
6:00 am – 9:00 am	10	15
9:00 am – 3:00 pm	15	15
3:00 pm – 6:00 pm	10	15
6:00 pm – 10:00 pm	15	15
10:00 pm – 12:25 am	30	30
12:25 am – 4:21 am	No Service	No Service

All times are estimated headways.
