= Overlake Village station =

Light rail station in Redmond, Washington

62 Overlake Village
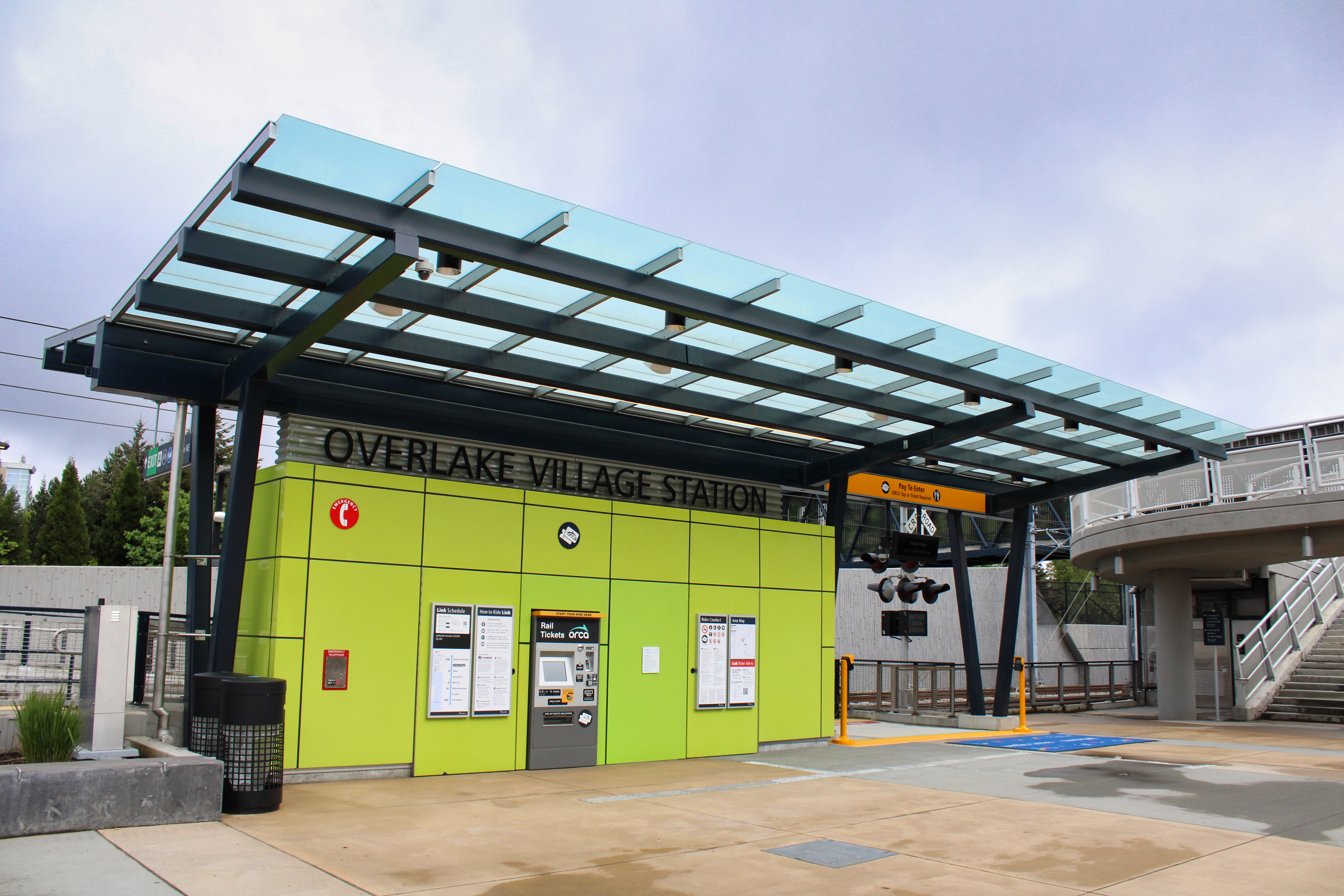
- Station entrance at the eastbound platform

General information
- Location: 2801 152nd Avenue Northeast; Redmond, Washington; United States
- Coordinates: 47°38′11″N 122°08′20″W
- System: Link light rail
- Owner: Sound Transit
- Platforms: 2 side platforms
- Tracks: 2
- Connections: King County Metro

Construction
- Structure type: At-grade
- Accessible: Yes

History
- Opened: April 27, 2024

Passengers
- 477 daily weekday boardings (2025); 152,561 total boardings (2025)

Services
Preceding station	Sound Transit	Following station
Link
BelRed toward Lynnwood City Center	2 Line	Redmond Technology toward Downtown Redmond
Location

Overlake Village station is a light rail station in Redmond, Washington, United States. It is at-grade station on the 2 Line, part of Sound Transit's Link light rail system. The station serves the Overlake neighborhood and its existing park and ride. Construction began on the station in 2017 and it opened on April 27, 2024.

== Location ==
Overlake Village station is adjacent to State Route 520 with its entrance on 152nd Avenue Northeast. A 500-foot (150 m) pedestrian bridge connects the station to the west side of the freeway; it began construction in 2020 and opened in January 2024. The station is four blocks from Overlake Park-and-Ride, which has 203 stalls. The Esterra Park transit oriented development is within walking distance from the station.

== History ==
Demolition of existing buildings at the site began in May 2017. The adjacent part of 152nd Avenue NE was closed from November 28 to December 19 while utilities under the street were relocated. It opened on April 27, 2024, as part of the initial section of the 2 Line.
