= Overlake Hospital Medical Center =

Overlake Medical Center
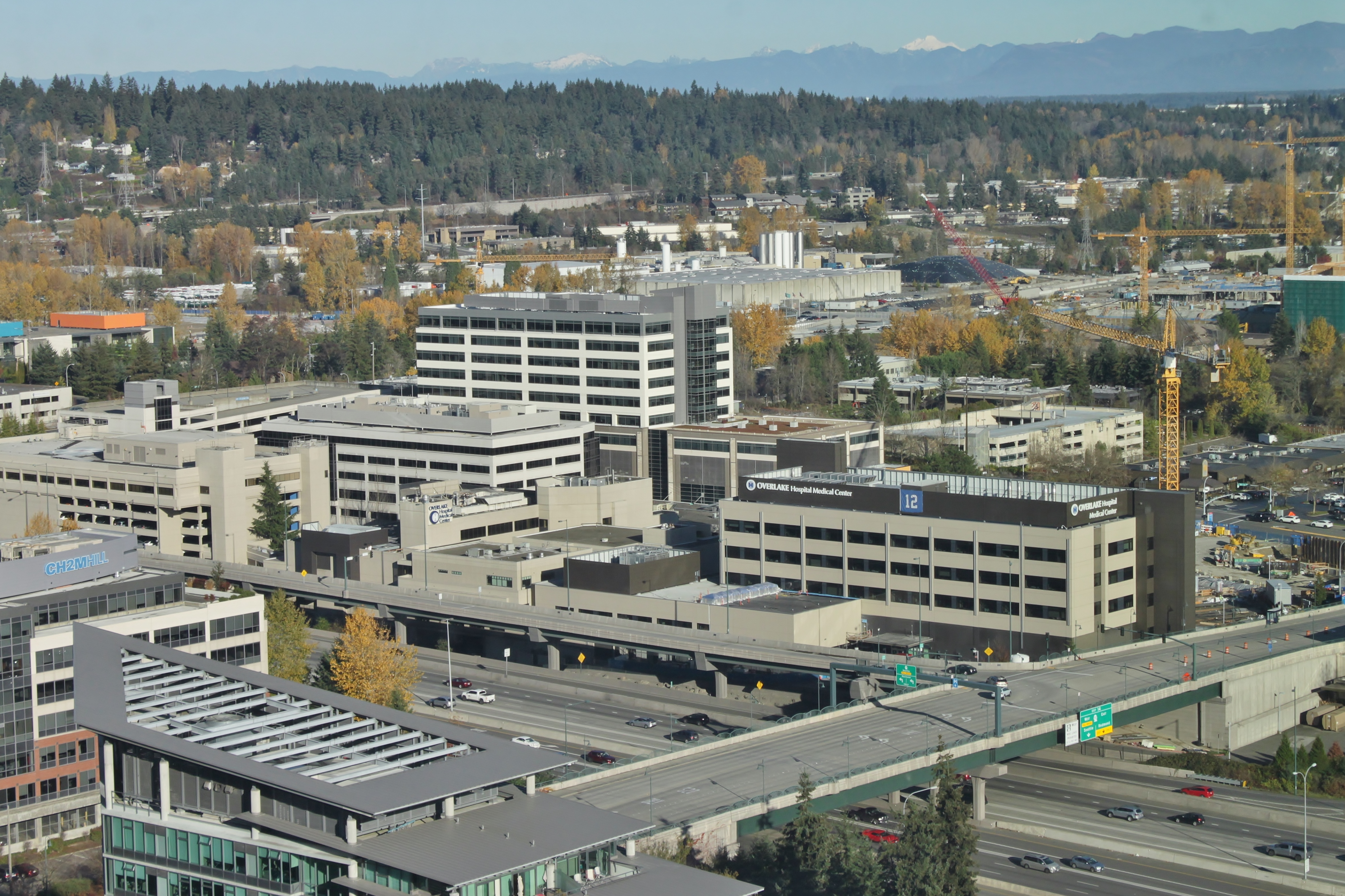
- Aerial view from southwest in 2018

Geography
- Location: 1035 116th Ave NE, Bellevue, Washington, United States
- Coordinates: 47.62°N 122.186°W

Services
- Emergency department: Level III trauma center
- Beds: 349

Helipads
- Helipad: Yes

History
- Founded: 1960; 66 years ago

Links
- Website: www.overlakehospital.org
- Lists: Hospitals in Washington state

Overlake Medical Center is a 349-bed non-profit community hospital in the northwest United States, located in Bellevue, Washington, east of Seattle. Opened in 1960, the hospital operates a level III emergency department.

In the last year with available data, the hospital had about 53,572 emergency department visits, 20,562 in-patient visits, 7,073 in-patient surgeries, and 7,512 outpatient surgeries. The hospital is accredited by the joint commission. The hospital has a da Vinci surgical robot that is used for surgical procedures.

== History ==
Overlake Memorial Hospital opened in 1960 at a cost of $1.2 million. Renamed to Overlake Hospital Medical Center in 1983 amid an expansion to add more services, it opened a helicopter landing pad in 2009 to receive cardiac and stroke patients. Overlake began opening regional urgent care and specialty clinics across the Eastside in the early 2000s and expanded its Bellevue hospital. The medical center submitted an application to build a hospital in Issaquah in 2004, but lost their bid to Swedish Medical Center.

In 2024, Overlake announced that it would join the MultiCare health system, a non-profit provider based in Tacoma, as its flagship facility in the northern Puget Sound region.
