= Downtown Redmond station =

Light rail station in Redmond, Washington

65 Downtown Redmond
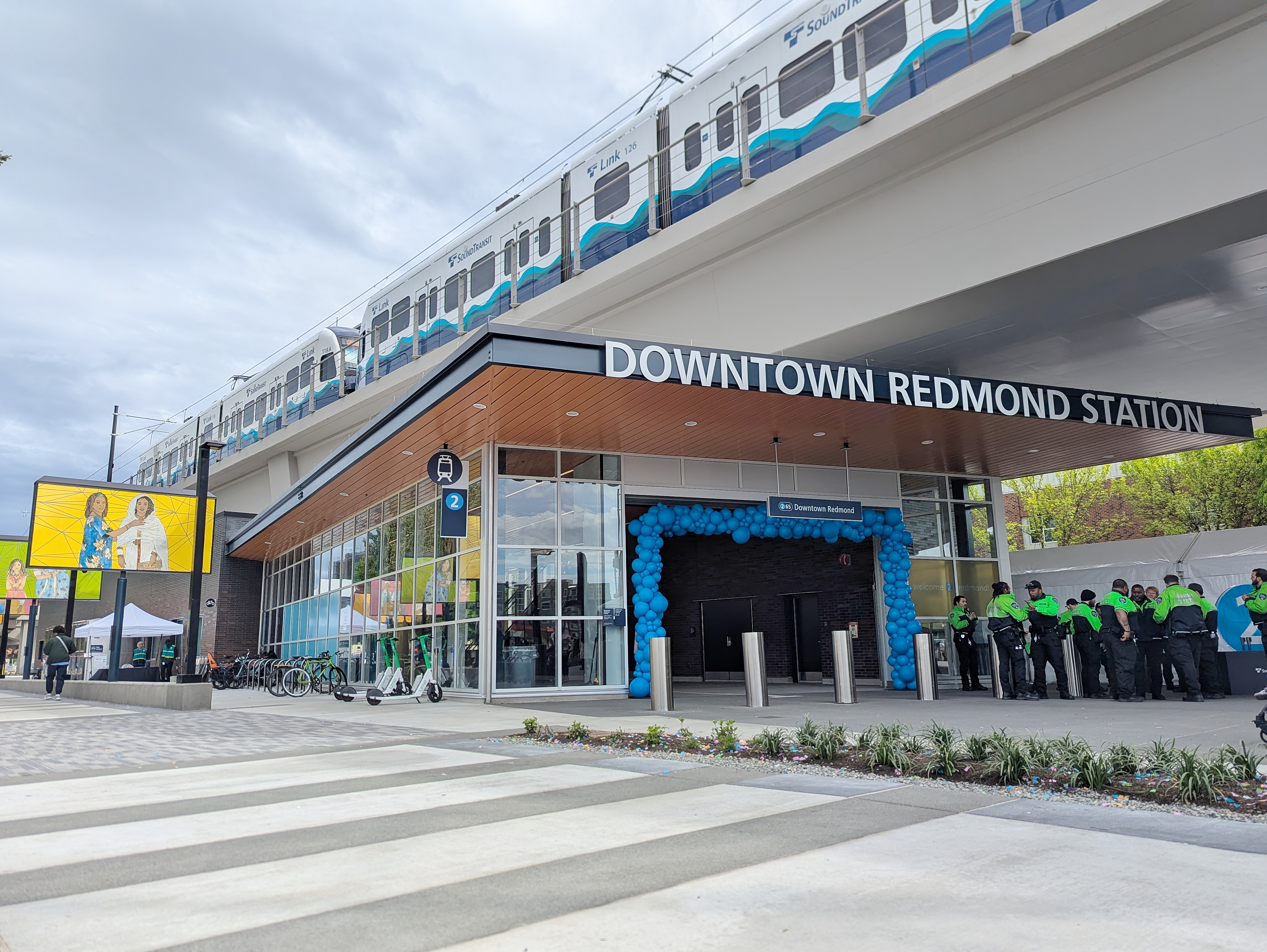
- East entrance on opening day

General information
- Location: 16620 Northeast 76th Street; Redmond, Washington; United States
- Coordinates: 47°40′20″N 122°07′13″W
- System: Link light rail
- Owner: Sound Transit
- Platforms: 1 island platform
- Tracks: 2
- Connections: King County Metro (RapidRide)

Construction
- Structure type: Elevated
- Accessible: Yes

History
- Opened: May 10, 2025

Services
| Preceding station | Sound Transit | Following station |
Link
| Marymoor Village toward Lynnwood City Center | 2 Line | Terminus |
Location

Downtown Redmond station is a Link light rail station on the north side of Redmond Town Center shopping mall in downtown Redmond, Washington. It is an elevated station with a single island platform along Cleveland Street between 164th and 166th avenues.

The station was originally included in the Sound Transit 2 ballot measure in 2008, but was left out of the East Link Extension after a funding shortfall stemming from the City of Bellevue's desire for a tunneled alignment under Downtown Bellevue. Sound Transit instead completed environmental reviews and selected a preferred alignment to Downtown Redmond, indefinitely deferring the final segment of East Link until a later date. The Sound Transit 3 ballot measure, passed in 2016, includes $1.1 billion in funding for the two stations in Downtown Redmond, which was planned to open by 2024. Preliminary engineering on the Redmond extension was approved in February 2016, after being suspended in 2010.

Downtown Redmond station is situated over the Redmond Central Connector park and trail and is immediately north of the Redmond Town Center, a regional shopping mall. The station opened to passenger service on May 10, 2025, with a celebration, booths along the Central Connector, and live music. The RapidRide B Line, which originally terminated at Redmond Transit Center, was extended to serve the station.

The station's public artwork consists of a set of 25 murals by six artists that were produced by a mosaics studio in Tieton. The murals includes depictions of Japanese American internment during World War II, botanical motifs, and motion.
