= Lakemont =

Lakemont may refer to:

- Lakemont, Georgia, an unincorporated community in Rabun County, United States
- Lakemont, New York, a hamlet in Yates County, New York, United States
- Lakemont, Pennsylvania, a census-designated place in Blair County, Pennsylvania
- Lakemont, Washington, a neighborhood in Bellevue, Washington, United States
- Lakemont Park, an amusement park in Altoona, Pennsylvania, United States
- Lakemont (grape), a grape cultivar
