= Wilburton, Washington =

Neighborhood in Bellevue, Washington, United States

Coordinates: 47°36′11″N 122°10′51″W

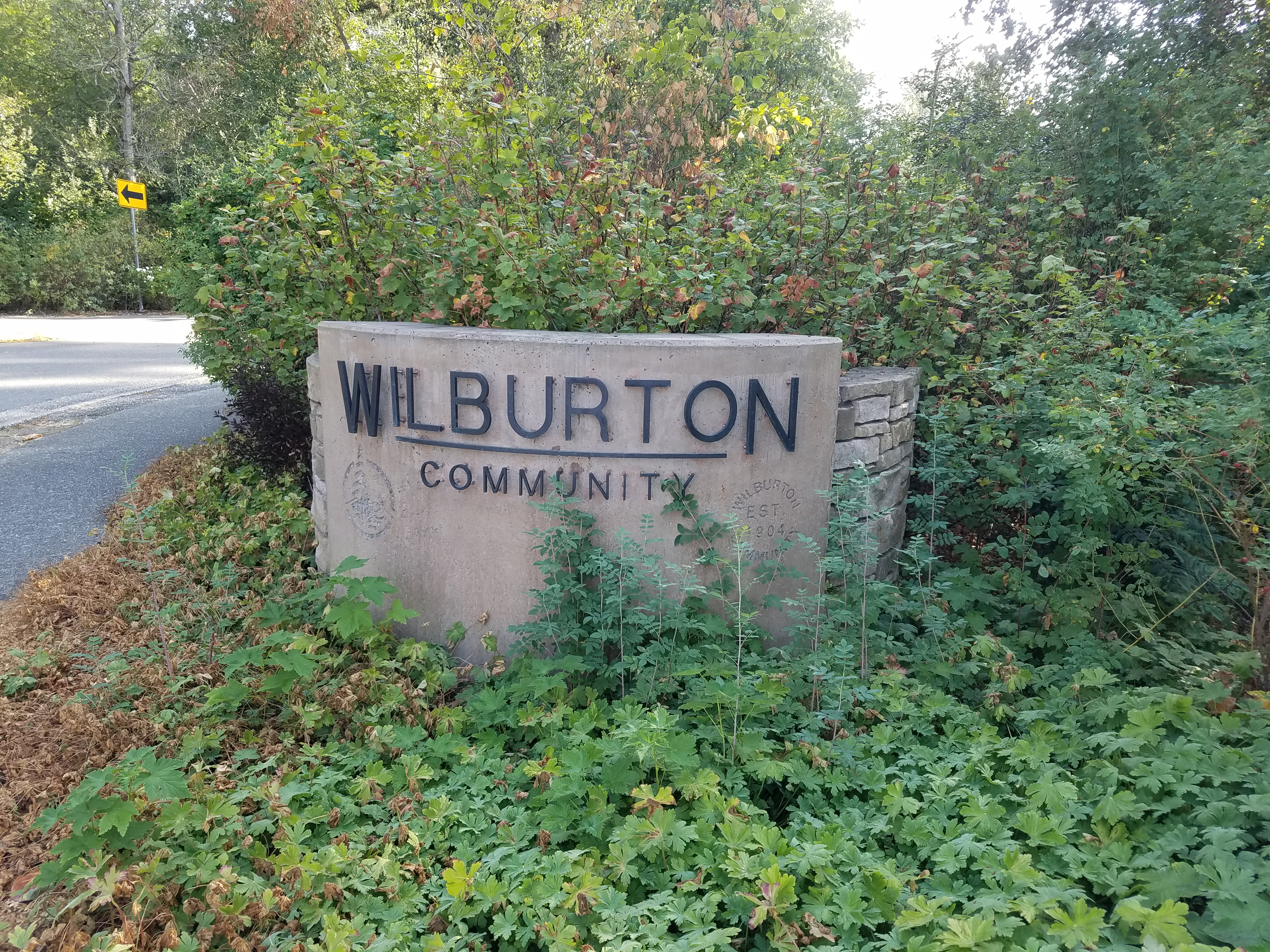
Wilburton community sign in Bellevue, Washington

Wilburton is a neighborhood in Bellevue, Washington, United States. It is situated to the east of downtown Bellevue, and to the west of the Crossroads and Lake Hills neighborhoods. Wilburton started out as an old logging camp, and was annexed by Bellevue in 1967. Currently, 3,790 people live in Wilburton.

== Background ==
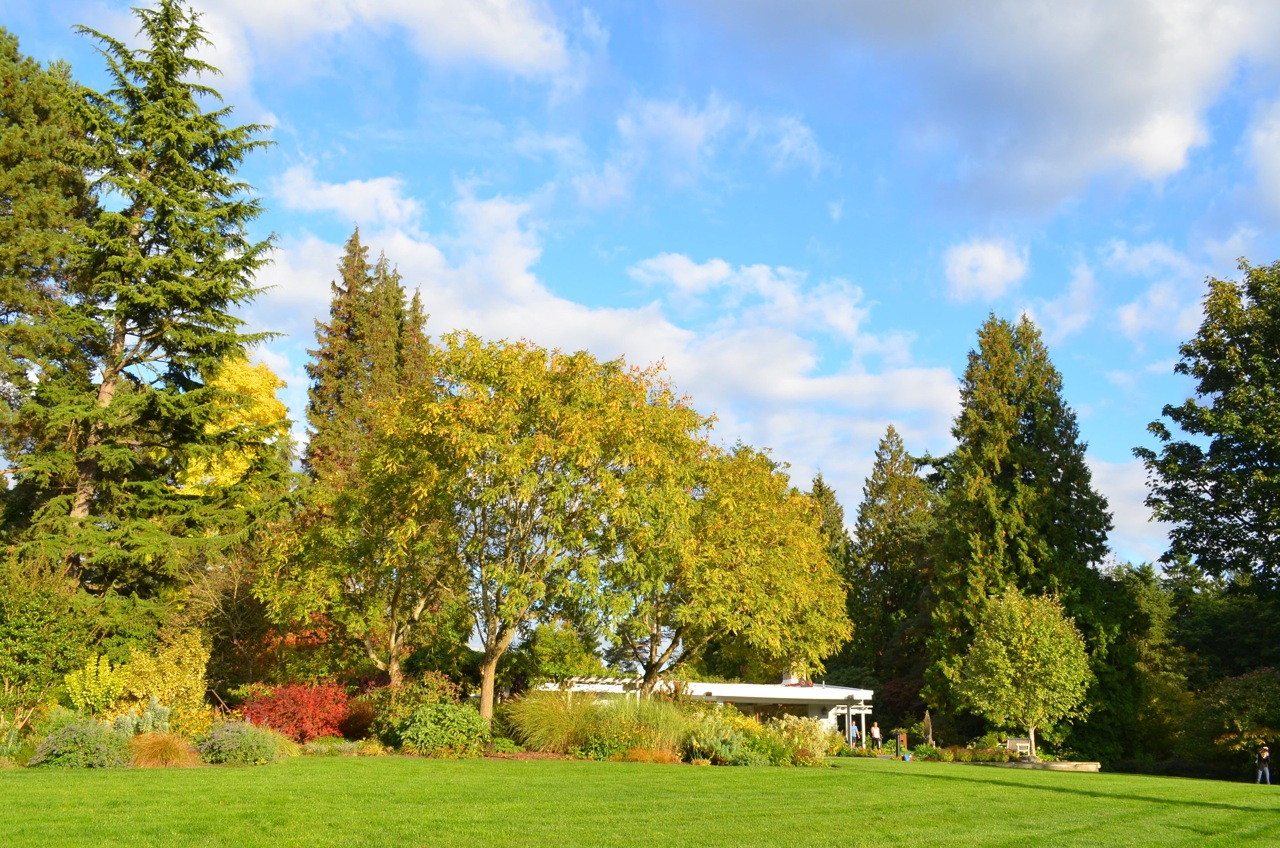
The Bellevue Botanical Garden in the Wilburton neighborhood of Bellevue, Washington

Wilburton was logged beginning in the 1890s by a man named William Powell. The first sawmill on the site was built in 1903 by George England and Manley Wilbur, from where Wilburton gets its name. In 1904, the town of Wilburton was platted and in 1905, the Hewitt-Lea Lumber Company took over the logging and milling operations. It built a spur line that followed Kelsey Creek up to the Lake Hills area and brought in the town's first locomotive in 1907.

The Hewitt-Lea Lumber Company logged the region between Lake Hills and the northern end of Cougar Mountain. The sawmill buildings were located underneath the current 405 overpass near the base of the Wilburton Trestle. Its operations were supported by a town of more than 350 people. The mill closed in 1919 when harvestable timber ran out. By the end of the 1920s, the mill and all logging-related structures were gone, but the town remained. Most of the houses were demolished by the 1960s and the properties have been re-developed into condominiums, apartments, and office parks.

Wilburton contains the International School, Wilburton Hill Park, Bellevue Botanical Garden and the 160-acre Kelsey Creek Park.
