= Wilburton (disambiguation) =

Wilburton may refer to:

== Places ==
England

- Wilburton, Cambridgeshire, England

United States

- Wilburton, Oklahoma, United States
- Wilburton, Kansas, United States
- Wilburton, Washington, United States

== See also ==
- Wilburton station (disambiguation)
