= Jewish Day School of Metropolitan Seattle =

Coordinates: 47.612586°N 122.128361°W

The Jewish Day School of Metropolitan Seattle (JDS)
- 4800 139th Ave SE Building 100; Bellevue, Washington 98008; United States

Information
- Type: Independent Jewish Community Day School
- Motto: Where curiosity leads to discovery.
- Established: 1980
- Head of School: Meghan Kimpton
- Grades: Preschool - 8th Grade
- Campus type: Urban
- Athletics: Soccer, Basketball, Volleyball, Track
- Mascot: Jaguars
- Website: http://www.jds.org

The Jewish Day School of Metropolitan Seattle (JDS) is the oldest community Jewish day school in the Pacific Northwest. JDS offers an integrated curriculum of Judaic studies and general studies focusing on the "whole student," from Pre-Kindergarten to grade 8.

== History ==
JDS was founded in 1980 by a group of community leaders as the region's first Jewish community day school. Regardless of Jewish lineage, the school was founded with the intent of providing all students a dual education in Judaic studies and general studies. In the mid-1980s, JDS purchased a former Bellevue, Washington elementary school to establish its campus, and it still occupies it today.

== Facilities ==
Located in Bellevue, Washington in the Crossroads neighborhood, adjacent to Temple B'nai Torah, JDS is situated on a seven-acre campus just south of the Microsoft Main Campus. The campus includes educational facilities with learning space, a library, a 10,000-square-foot (930 m2) athletic center, as well as a soccer and play field. They will move to a location near the Herzl-Ner Tamid Conservative Congregation in Mercer Island for the 2026-2027 school year and beyond, following the sale of the current campus in Crossroads.

== Curriculum ==
JDS's integrated curriculum focuses both on Judaic Studies and general studies and is "designed to encourage the development of the whole child." In addition, its curriculum envelopes a natural language acquisition program for Hebrew. By Grade 8, when students journey to Israel, all students are expected to be proficient.

Augmenting its curriculum, the school places special emphasis on mitzvah (community service) projects, with students expected to undertake them regularly. In addition, each year, it has a Mitzvah Day, when everyone involved with the school is invited to work together with a community service organization to perform good deeds.

JDS students use computer labs, laptops and smart boards in the classrooms.

== Recognition ==
In 2011, the Partnership for Excellence in Jewish Education presented JDS with a Challenge Award for its Discovery Grant program which has strengthened enrollment by providing grants over a two-year period to new families enrolling at JDS.

In 2012, the King County Green Schools Program recognized JDS' efforts in energy conservation and recycling.

== Accreditation ==
- Northwest Association of Independent Schools

== Affiliations ==
- RAVSAK
- Partnership for Excellence in Jewish Education (PEJE)
- Seattle Foundation
- Jewish Federation of Greater Seattle
- Samis Foundation
