= Theatre33 =

- Interactive map of Theatre33
- Address: 13243 NE 20th Street, Bellevue, Washington 98005
- Location: Bellevue, Washington, U.S.
- Coordinates: 47.6298°N 122.1595°W
- Owner: Theatre33
- Operator: Theatre33
- Capacity: 35
- Type: Community theatre (black-box)
- Event: Theatre

Construction
- Opened: 2013

Website
- theatre33wa.org

Theatre33 is a bilingual non-profit community theater located in Bellevue, Washington.

== History ==
Theatre33 was founded in 2013 by Marianna Chebotaryova to present stage productions in Russian and English.

After informal living-room performances and rented-space appearances in 2013, Theatre33 leased a 35-seat black-box venue in Bellevue in 2016, establishing a regular performance schedule. It expanded its programming in 2017 and 2018, and in 2019 announced its first full season of plays for children, youth, and adults. Performances were disrupted in 2020 due to the COVID-19 pandemic, which led to a shift toward virtual programming.

In 2022, Theatre33 moved to a newly constructed venue in Bellevue's BelRed Arts District with increased capacity and performance spaces. The new facility opened in October 2023.

== Production ==
Theatre33 produces a wide range of productions each year, spanning children's shows, youth theatre, and plays for adult general audiences.

In January 2020, Theatre33 debuted Animal Tales, an English-language collection of eleven short plays by Don Nigro that retells human history through animal characters. In addition to original youth pieces, such as Dennis E. Noble's one-act A Game performed by teens, Theatre33 also stages classic and contemporary works for adults. In late 2022, it mounted its first all-English mainstage plays, including Oscar Wilde's The Importance of Being Earnest and David Ives' modern comedy Venus in Fur, while continuing to offer Russian-language plays with supertitles for bilingual audiences.
