= Bel-Red, Bellevue =

Coordinates: 47°37′30″N 122°09′50″W

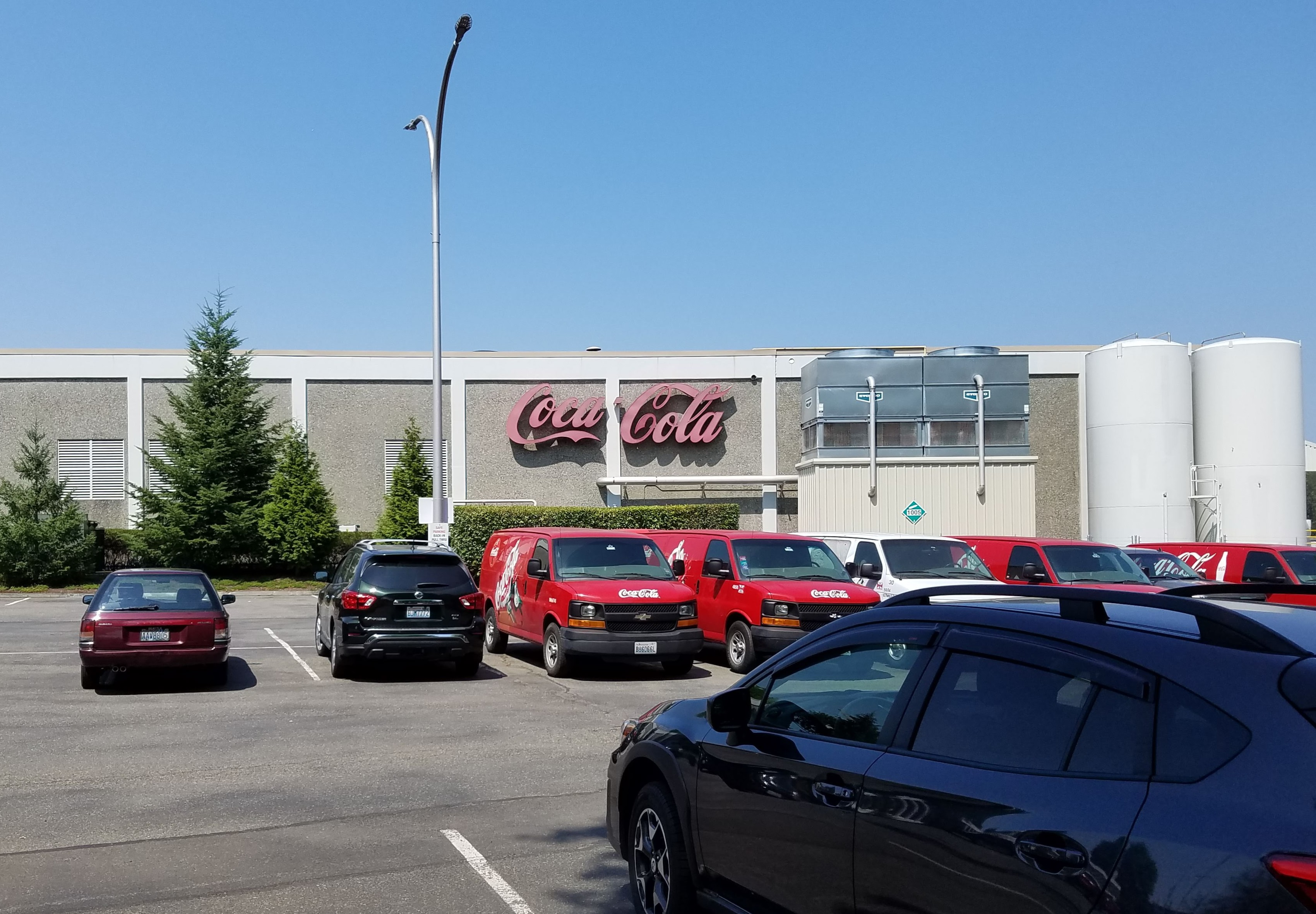
Coca-Cola building in the Bel-Red area of Bellevue, Washington in 2018.

Bel-Red is an industrial neighborhood of Bellevue, Washington, located in the northeastern portion of the city.

== History ==
Bel-Red was developed in the 1960s for warehouses and manufacturing facilities, and was named for its location between the cities of Bellevue and Redmond.

The area was re-zoned to support non-industrial uses in 2009, paving the way for the development of the Spring District, a mixed-use district in the western Bel-Red area.

== Transportation ==
Bel-Red is served by Bel-Red Road, which runs diagonally through the neighborhood. State Route 520 passes to the north of the neighborhood.

In 2024, Sound Transit opened its East Link light rail line, with two stops in Bel-Red: Spring District at 120th Avenue and BelRed at 130th Avenue.

== BelRed Arts District ==
The BelRed Arts District was first designated as an arts village as part of the 2009 BelRed Land Use Code Update that has facilitated BelRed's transition from a light-industrial and commercial area into a mixed-use, urban district. The original designation was a point on a map near 136th Avenue Northeast and Spring Boulevard, the original location of the Pacific Northwest Ballet's Francia Russell Center.

The BelRed Arts District has a wide array of arts organizations, businesses, artists and makers working across the district, including Theatre33.
