= Overlake, Washington =

Region comprising parts of eastern Bellevue and southern Redmond, Washington

Coordinates: 47°37′52″N 122°08′35″W

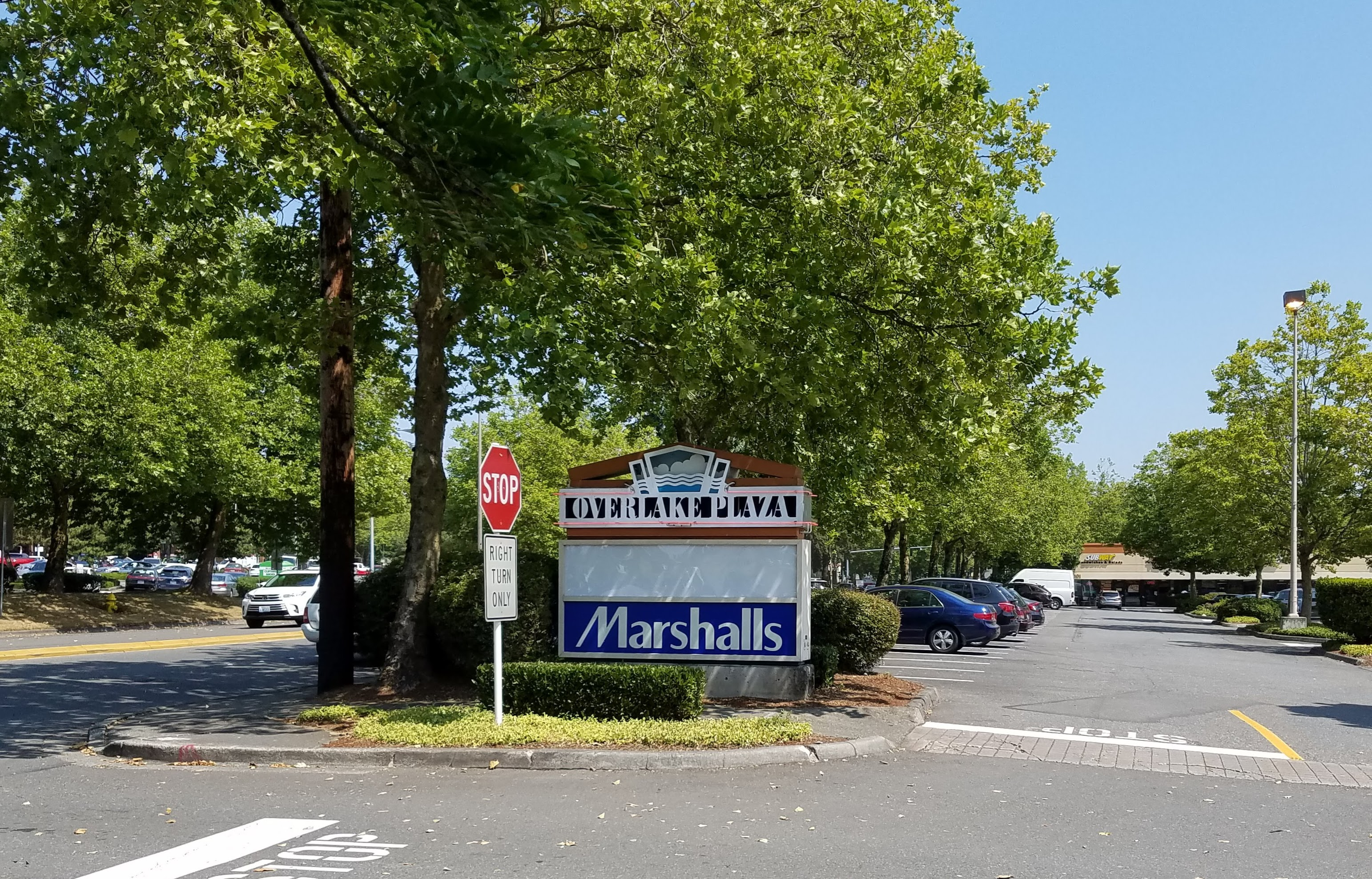
Overlake Plaza sign next to NE 24th Street.

Overlake is the name for a region comprising parts of eastern Bellevue and southern Redmond, Washington. It is in the vicinity of Microsoft's main corporate campus and is officially defined as a neighborhood consisting of the parts of Redmond lying south of Northeast 60th Street and between 148th Avenue Northeast and Bellevue-Redmond Road. The Overlake area, so named because it is located across Lake Washington from Seattle, straddles the boundaries of Bellevue and Redmond and is considered to have its own identity distinct from those of both cities.

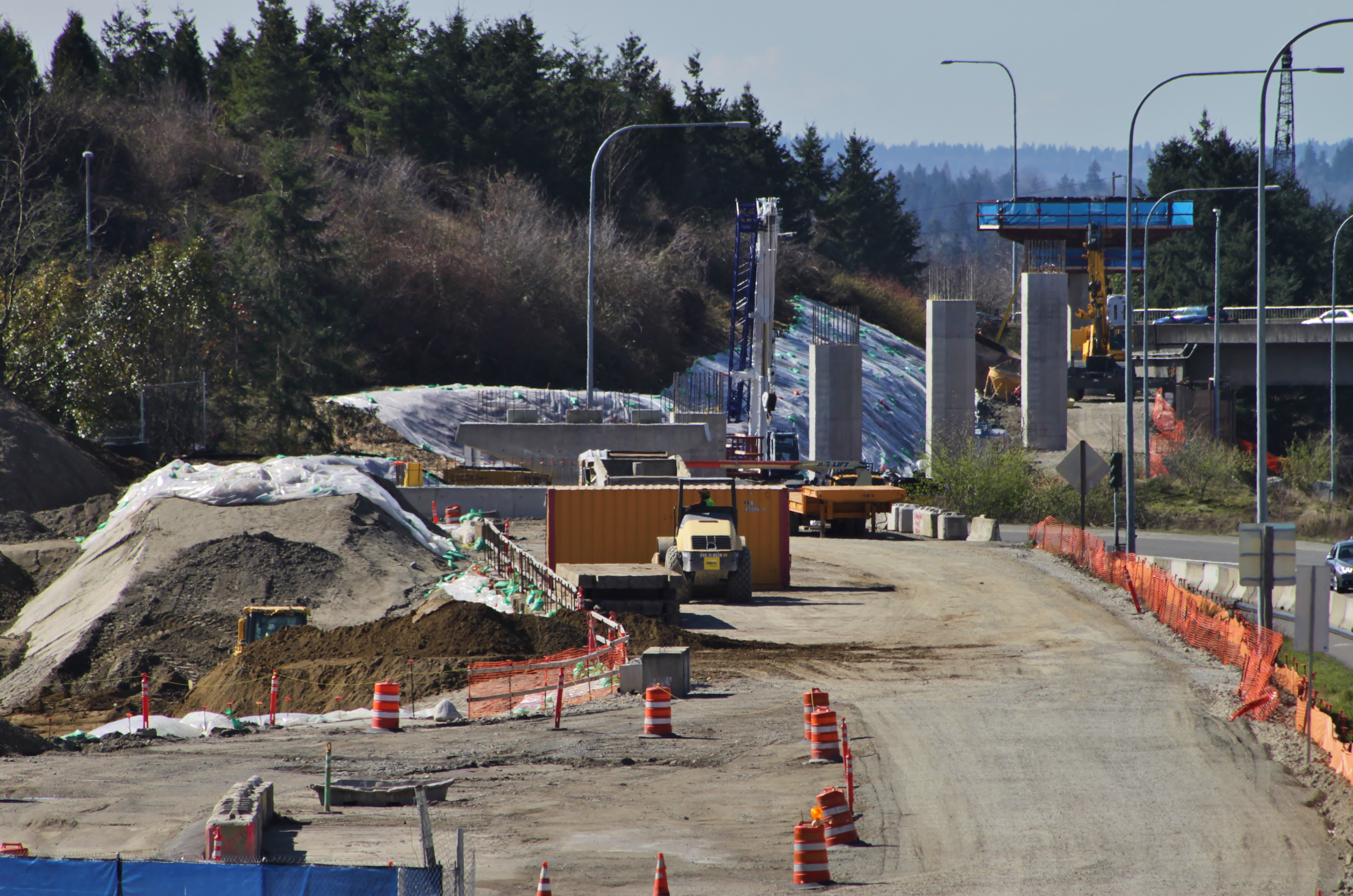
Construction of Overlake Village Station in 2018.

Aside from Microsoft, the area is home to a number of corporate campuses, including the headquarters of Nintendo of America, and includes a busy retail district along 148th Avenue N.E. and N.E. 24th Street. It is also the home of the Civil Air Patrol Overlake Composite Squadron.

Historically, the term referred to a much larger region of King County that is collectively known today as the Eastside.

== History ==
The Overlake name extends at least as far back as 1927 with the foundation of the Overlake Transit Service, a precursor to King County Metro. The Bellevue School District and Bellevue High School were formerly known as the Overlake School District and Overlake High School prior to 1950. The two largest institutions in the region named "Overlake" are not actually located in today's Overlake area: Overlake Hospital in central Bellevue, and Overlake Christian Church in north central Redmond near the Sammamish River.

State Route 520 runs through Overlake on its way from Redmond to Seattle.

The Overlake area is where The Overlake School originated before moving to rural Redmond.

== See also ==
- Crossroads, Bellevue
