= Wilburton station =

Wilburton station may refer to:

- Wilburton railway station, a train station in Cambridgeshire, England
- Wilburton station (Sound Transit), a light rail station in Bellevue, Washington

== See also ==
- Wilburton (disambiguation)
