= Bellevue Downtown Park =

Park in Bellevue, Washington, United States

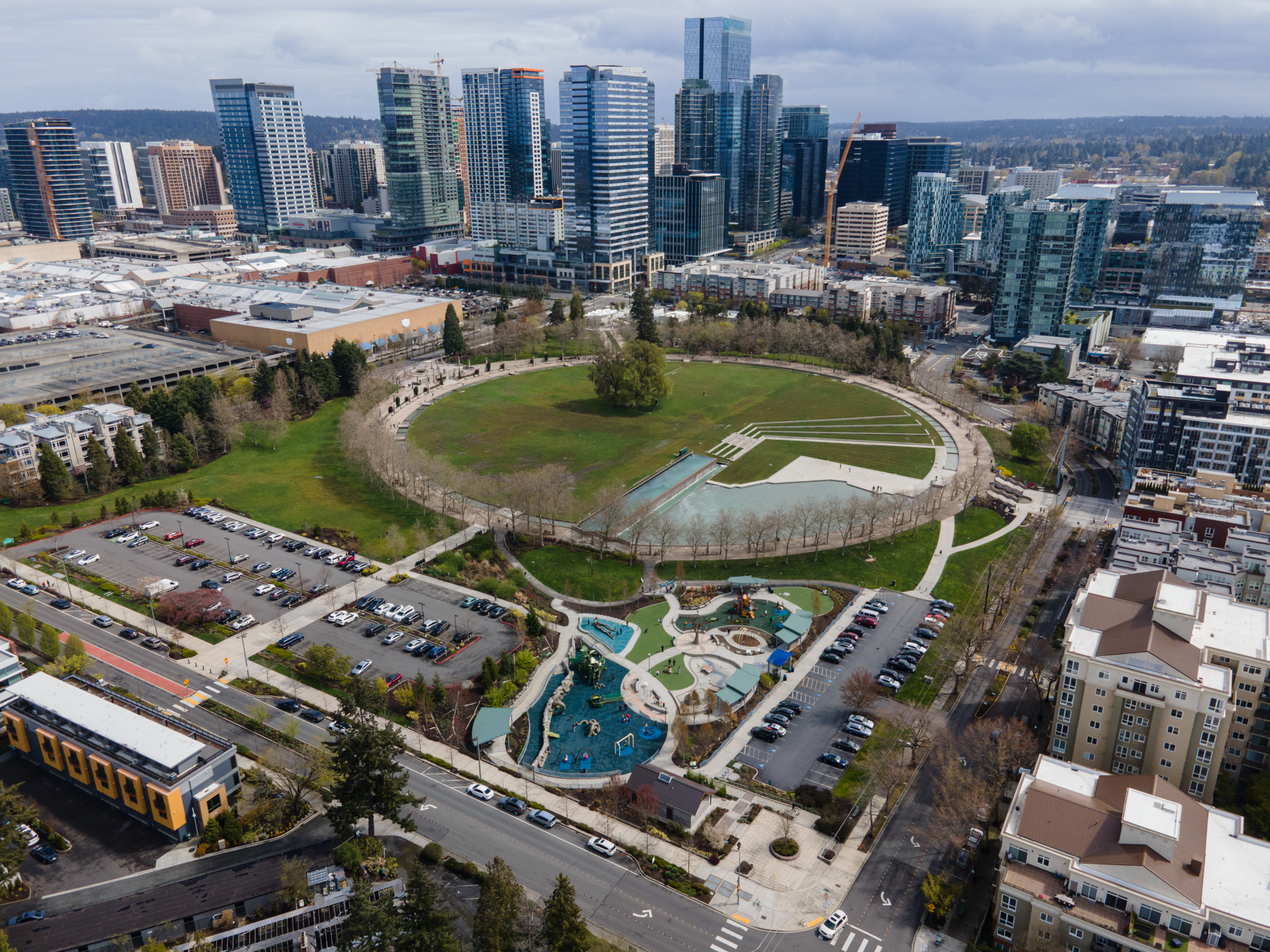
- Interactive map of Bellevue Downtown Park
- Type: Urban park
- Location: Bellevue, Washington
- Coordinates: 47°36′45″N 122°12′15″W
- Area: 20-acre (81,000 m^{2})
- Created: 1983

Bellevue Downtown Park is a 20-acre (81,000 m^{2}) park located in downtown Bellevue, Washington, United States, a suburb of Seattle. The park consists of a circular ring with a large central greenspace that is surrounded by a moat and walking trails. It is situated between Bellevue Square Mall to the north, Bellevue Way to the east, and Main Street to the south.

The idea for a park in downtown Bellevue was created from civic and private leadership, which saw the City's potential for shaping its future during a time of rapid growth and development. In the early 1980s, economic forces were rapidly influencing the character of downtown Bellevue. Its center was emerging as a hub for commercial and business activity, and the city was seen as a desirable residential community. In the middle of this dynamic period of growth, the City Council and community leaders saw the necessity of creating an amenity within the City which would help define its character and provide open space in an increasingly urban downtown core. The park was designed for passive and unstructured use, and as a "respite from the activities of busy urban life."

In December 1983, the City of Bellevue acquired 17 acres (69,000 m^{2}) within Bellevue's central business district from the Bellevue School District for $14.3 Million, and financed the transaction through Councilmanic bonds backed by a local option sales tax. In the years since the park land was purchased, approximately four acres have been added to the site.

== Design ==
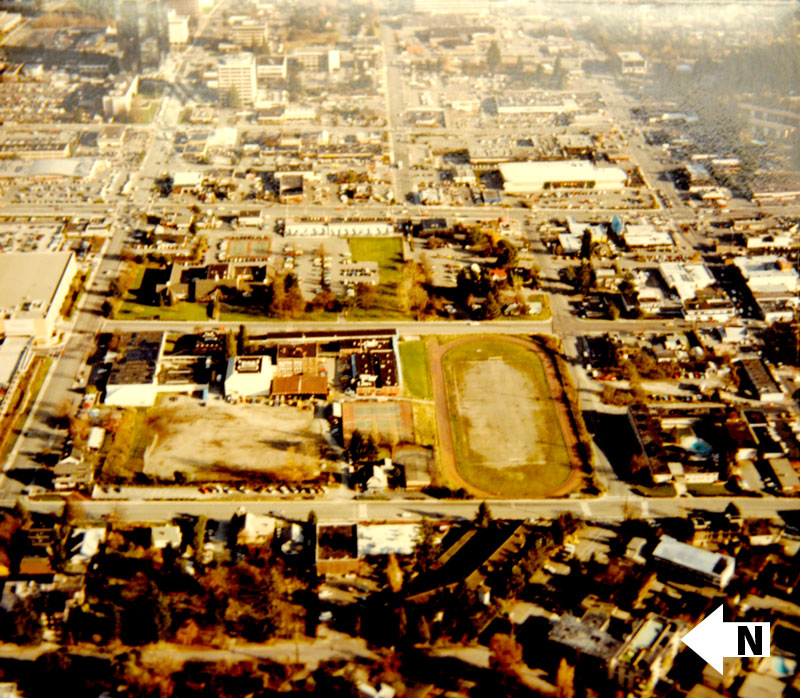
Aerial photo looking east toward the future site of Bellevue's Downtown Park (circa early 1980s). Bellevue Square is to the left.

An international competition was conducted to select the design concept for Downtown Park. As a first step in formulating a competition program, a survey was distributed to 55,000 businesses and households asking what they envisioned in a downtown park. A majority of the 5,000 respondents indicated a preference for a pedestrian-oriented green space that would remain relatively free of buildings and special interest facilities. A total of 67 entries, each of whom paid $100 to enter the competition, were received from throughout the United States, Canada, and Europe. These entries were judged by a jury consisting of local leaders, Bellevue staff, and the chairpersons of the University of Washington's School of Architecture and Landscape Architecture.

In December, 1984, the jury recommended the concept submitted by Beckley-Myers of Milwaukee. The design itself called for a circular promenade for walking which defined a 10-acre (40,000 m^{2}) open space bordered by a canopy of trees, and a continuous canal terminating in a giant waterfall and reflecting pool. Between the promenade and surrounding streets, the design proposed opportunities to create small park venues, such as formal gardens, outdoor performance areas, picnic spaces, and children's playgrounds, which all ranked highly in the citizens' survey.

One unique element of the park's design is the preservation of the footprint of Bellevue's former South Union High School, originally located on the Downtown Park site. The footprint can readily be seen on aerial photos of the park, in the northeast quadrant of the large open meadow.

=== World War I Memorial ===
The trees located in the center of the park are part of a memorial to Eastside World War I veterans. On November 11, 1926, the Bellevue Minute Women and Bellevue School District dedicated the memorial. The original monument consisted of a plaque with the names of three men killed in the war, three elm trees, and a 48-star US flag flying on a 65-foot (20 m) pole. The flag pole is no longer present. In 2006, one elm tree died and was replaced after a severe windstorm. For years, the city and private parties planned to restore the aging monument. Restoration work began in 2015.

=== Piloti ===
The sculpture Piloti in 2023

Piloti is a 23-foot tall sculpture by artist Marc Fornes and the Brooklyn-based studio THEVERYMANY, installed in the plaza known as the Northeast Gateway, at the corner of Northeast Fourth Street and Bellevue Way. The largest ever city-funded free-standing artwork was completed in May 2023. It is made of 6,000 white aluminum panels, and has fluted columns supporting a perforated canopy.

The sculpture was selected by the Bellevue Arts Commission and commissioned by the city. Its installation marked the end of the Northeast Gateway project, which added a plaza and water feature in 2021. Piloti required assembly with 180,000 rivets.

== Development ==
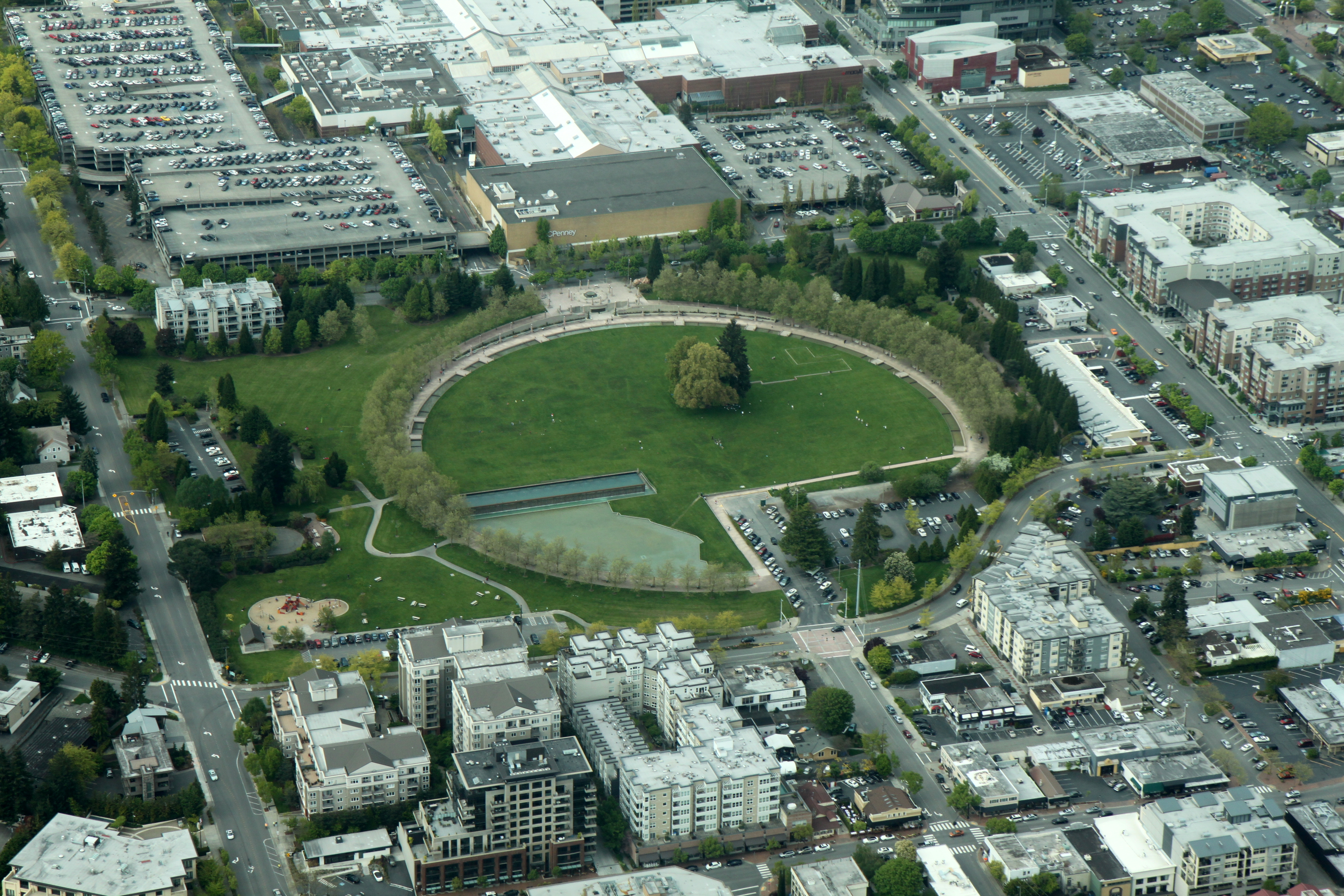
Aerial view of Bellevue Downtown Park in 2012

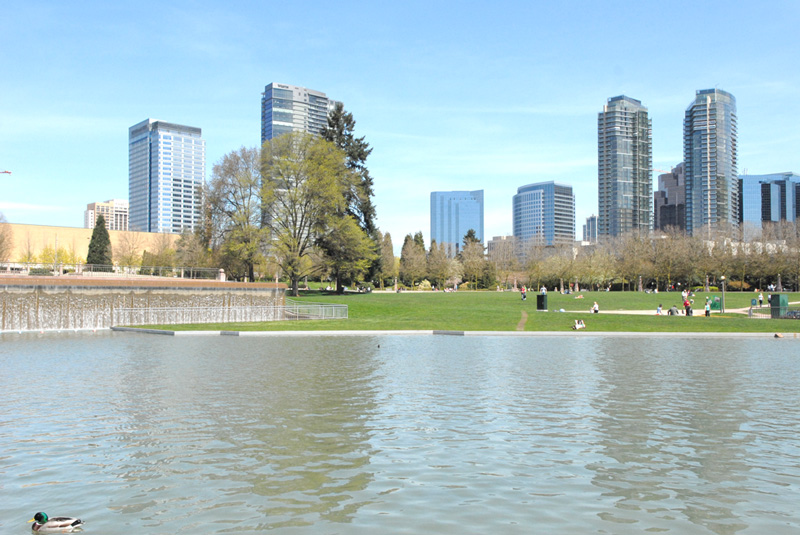
Bellevue's Downtown Park in 2009

Downtown Park utilized a unique funding mechanism, heavily reliant on donations from the community. It was important for the City of Bellevue to demonstrate visible progress on the park construction immediately. Because of this, the park was developed on a pay-as-you-go basis, with fundraising processes running parallel to construction.

Phase I of park development included construction of the northeast corner of the park, and was officially opened at a ceremony on September 13, 1987. Phase II of park development, which included completion of the western side of the park, was finished in 1990 following approval of a park bond issue.

Since that time, additional portions of the park have been completed, including:

- construction of a parking lot along the park's west boundary;
- construction of a restroom and children's play area in the southwest corner of the park;
- additional parking and re-alignment of SE 2nd Street in the southeast corner of the park; and
- removal of a structure from the northwest corner of the park.

A major expansion project, including completion of the circular canal, improved parking, enhancements to park entrances, and a new "Inspiration Playground", was completed in June 2017.
