= West Lake Sammamish, Bellevue, Washington =

West Lake Sammamish, Washington
- Neighborhood
- Location of West Lake Sammamish, Washington
- Coordinates: 47°34′16″N 122°5′56″W
- Country: United States
- State: Washington
- County: King
- City: Bellevue

Area
  - Total: 3.4 sq mi (8.9 km^{2})
  - Land: 1.4 sq mi (3.7 km^{2})
  - Water: 2.0 sq mi (5.2 km^{2})
- Elevation: 30 ft (9 m)

Population (2000)
  - Total: 5,937
  - Density: 4,203/sq mi (1,622.8/km^{2})
- Time zone: UTC-8 (Pacific (PST))
  - Summer (DST): UTC-7 (PDT)
- FIPS code: 53-77535
- GNIS feature ID: 1867642

West Lake Sammamish was a census-designated place (CDP) in King County, Washington, United States. The population was 5,937 at the 2000 census. The census area was annexed by Bellevue in 2001.

Based on per capita income, one of the more reliable measures of affluence, West Lake Sammamish ranks 15th of 522 areas in the state of Washington to be ranked.

== Geography ==
West Lake Sammamish is located at 47°34′16″N 122°5′56″W (47.571053, -122.098965).

According to the United States Census Bureau, the CDP has a total area of 3.4 square miles (8.9 km^{2}), of which, 1.4 square miles (3.7 km^{2}) of it is land and 2.0 square miles (5.2 km^{2}) of it (58.89%) is water.

== Demographics ==
Historical population
Census	Pop.	Note	%±
1990	6,087		—
2000	5,937		−2.5%

As of the census of 2000, there were 5,937 people, 2,164 households, and 1,659 families residing in the CDP. The population density was 4,203.1 people per square mile (1,625.7/km^{2}). There were 2,229 housing units at an average density of 1,578.0/sq mi (610.4/km^{2}). The racial makeup of the CDP was 86.53% White, 1.08% African American, 0.42% Native American, 9.03% Asian, 0.08% Pacific Islander, 0.51% from other races, and 2.36% from two or more races. Hispanic or Latino of any race were 1.90% of the population.

There were 2,164 households, out of which 38.8% had children under the age of 18 living with them, 67.0% were married couples living together, 7.1% had a female householder with no husband present, and 23.3% were non-families. 16.5% of all households were made up of individuals, and 3.7% had someone living alone who was 65 years of age or older. The average household size was 2.73 and the average family size was 3.07.

In the CDP, the population was spread out, with 26.4% under the age of 18, 5.4% from 18 to 24, 30.9% from 25 to 44, 28.8% from 45 to 64, and 8.5% who were 65 years of age or older. The median age was 39 years. For every 100 females, there were 97.6 males. For every 100 females age 18 and over, there were 93.1 males.

The median income for a household in the CDP was $86,415, and the median income for a family was $95,421. Males had a median income of $62,045 versus $37,768 for females. The per capita income for the CDP was $38,474. About 1.7% of families and 3.5% of the population were below the poverty line, including 2.7% of those under age 18 and 4.3% of those age 65 or over.
