= Gontmakher Mansion =

House in Bellevue, Washington, US

Coordinates: 47.636778°N 122.161451°W

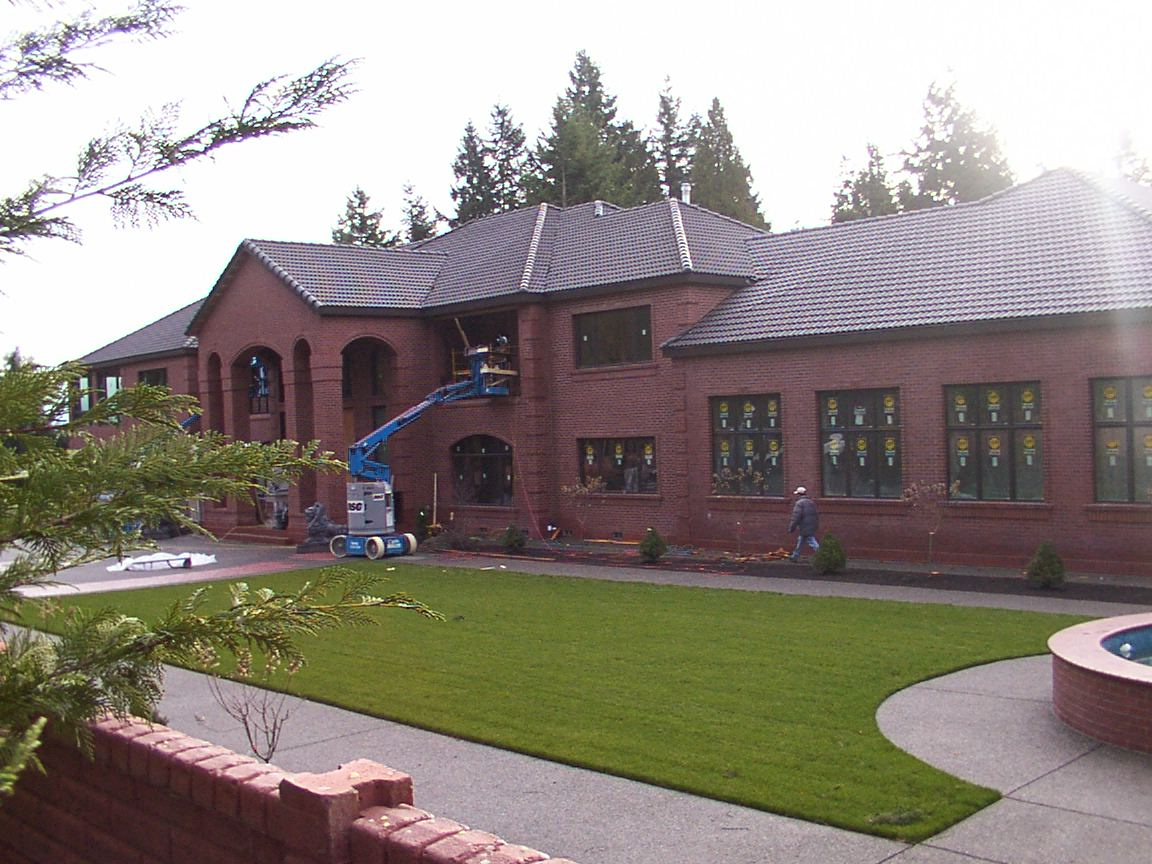
Gontmakher Mansion under construction in December, 2005

The Gontmakher Mansion is a multimillion-dollar, 13,610-square-foot (1,264 m^{2}) brick mansion in the Bridle Trails neighborhood of Bellevue, Washington. As of late 2005, it had been under construction for five years and was still unoccupied. Its brick construction and the tall brick wall completely surrounding the property give it a fortresslike appearance (brick is a material not frequently used in the Pacific Northwest).

The City of Bellevue has been in litigation with the owners over unlawful clearcutting of trees and issuance of a short plat for the property the mansion lies on. A ruling in the court case held that the City of Bellevue is a juristic person with respect to the state anti-SLAPP law.

The owner was a "crab mogul" from Ukraine who became a United States citizen and owned in Bellevue what was in the 2000s decade the largest United States importer of Russian crab and other seafood.
