= Crossroads, Bellevue =

Neighborhood in Bellevue, Washington, United States

Coordinates: 47.621°N 122.144°W

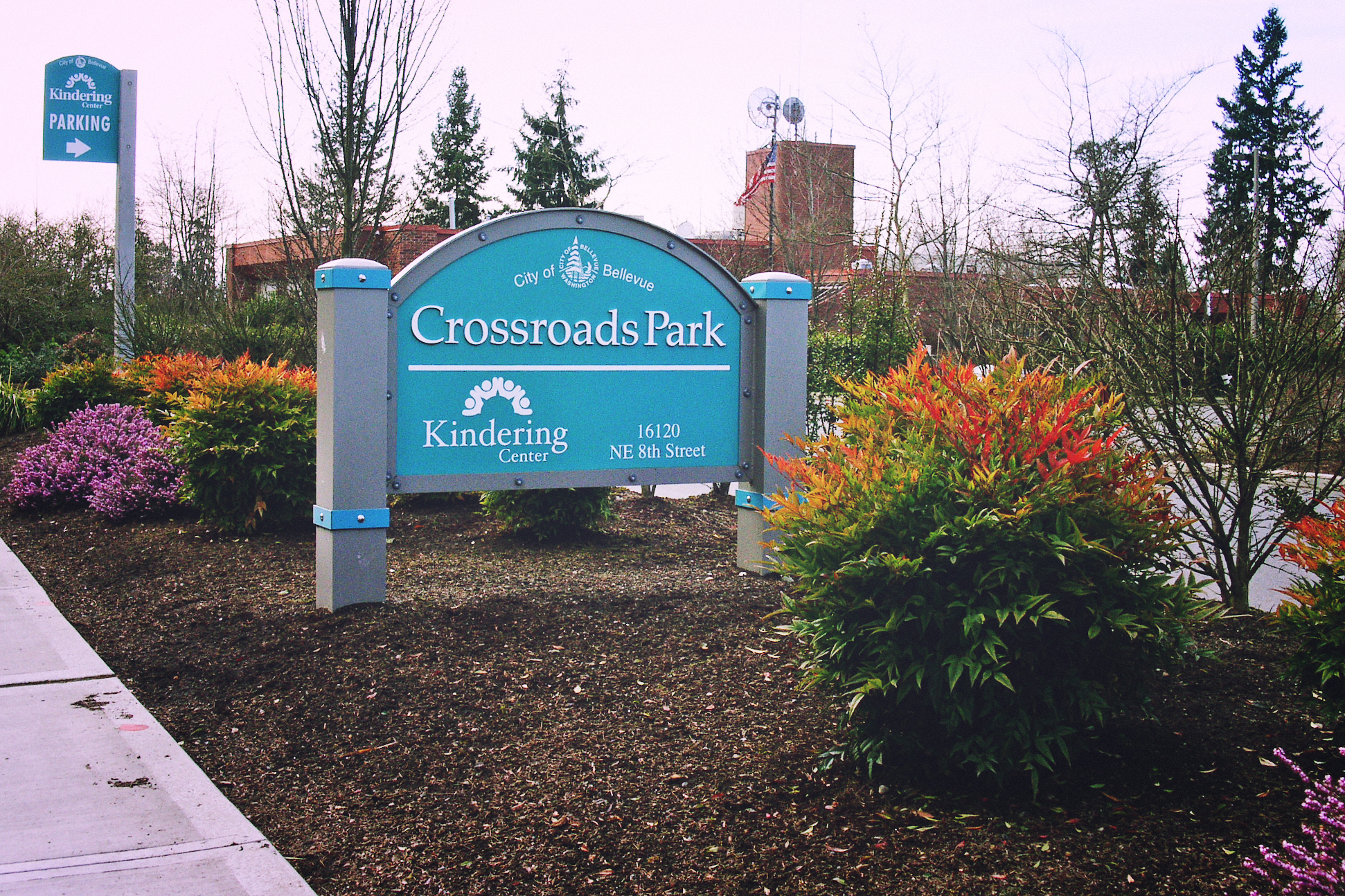
Crossroads Park on NE 8th Street, east of the Crossroads Shopping Center.

Crossroads is a neighborhood in Bellevue, Washington. It is situated in the north and eastern portion of the city, lying south of Bellevue-Redmond Road, east of Bellevue's Wilburton neighborhood, and north of Lake Hills.

The Crossroads area was originally referred to as "Highlands". During the latter half of the 1800s and into the early twentieth century, its land was largely used for timber harvesting. By the 1920s, farming had taken hold in the present-day Crossroads and Lake Hills areas, much of it conducted by Japanese immigrants. This agricultural activity was abruptly curtailed following the Japanese American Internment in 1942, and the farmland was quickly replaced by suburban housing during the post-war years. The Crossroads area was annexed by Bellevue in 1964.

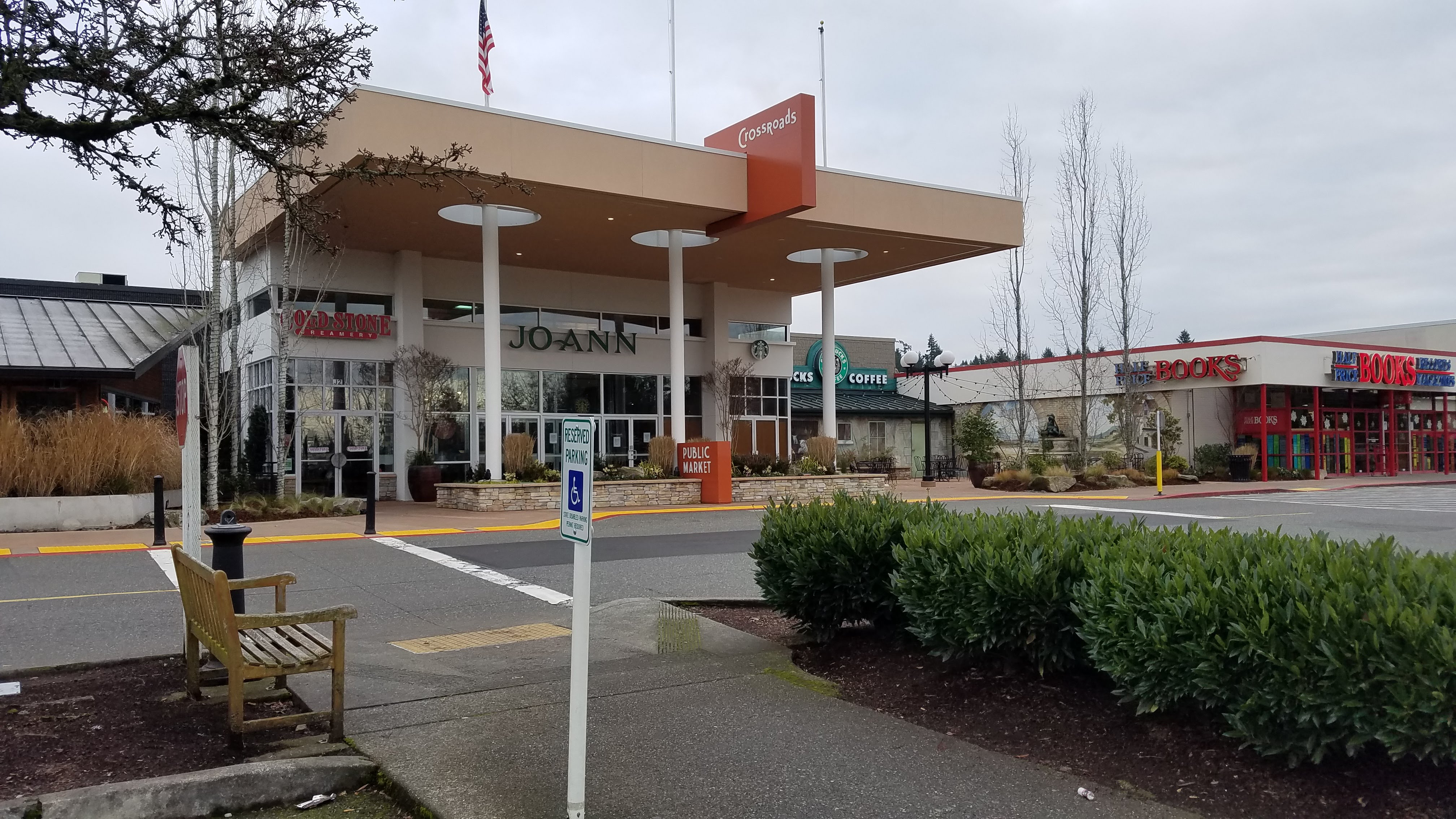
West entrance to the Crossroads Shopping Center.

The Crossroads Shopping Center opened in 1962, and following revitalization efforts by Ron Sher starting in 1988, now serves as a vibrant unofficial community center. By the early 2000s, Crossroads had become the second-most densely populated area of Bellevue, following the downtown area. The non-white population in the Crossroads neighborhood exceeded 60 percent by 2010.

== See also ==
- Overlake, Washington
