= International School (Bellevue, Washington) =

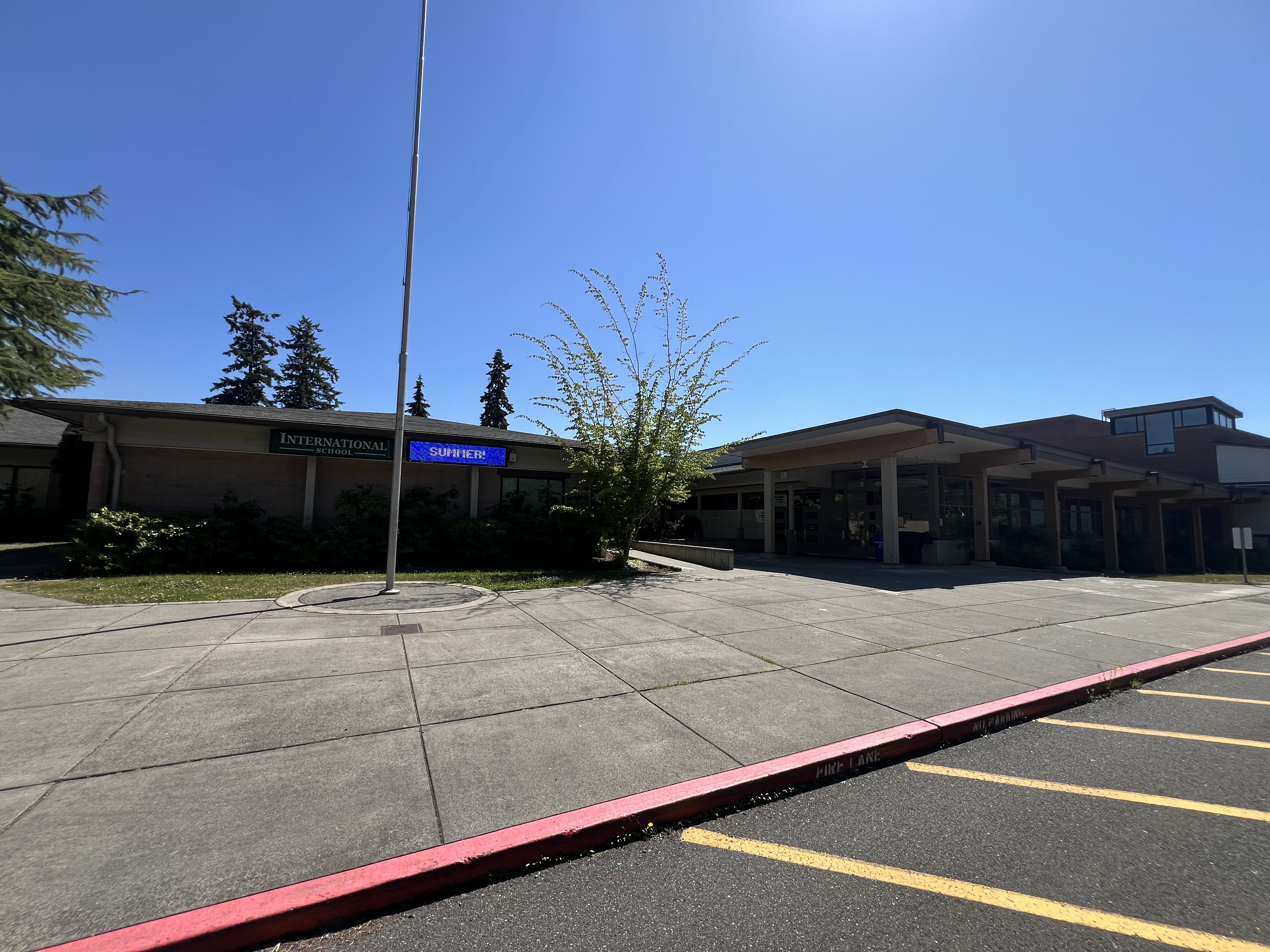
- Front entrance, school on summer break

Location
- 445 128th Ave. SE; Bellevue, Washington; United States; 47°36′16″N 122°10′20″W

Information
- Type: Choice, middle and high school
- Established: 1991
- School district: Bellevue School District
- Principal: Russell White
- Faculty: 30.46 (FTE)
- Grades: 6-12
- Enrollment: 573 (2018–19)
- Student to teacher ratio: 18.81
- Campus type: Suburban
- Colors: Green and Silver
- Mascot: Titan
- Website: www.bsd405.org/international

International School (IS) is a school for students in grades 6th–12th in the Bellevue School District. The school follows a seven by seven curriculum wherein students pursue studies in seven core academic areas for seven years of attendance. The seven core subjects included are: English, Science, Math, Social Studies, Physical Education, Fine Arts, and French.

== Admission ==
Admission to International School is based on a lottery system. All students living within Bellevue School District (BSD) boundaries are eligible to enter a lottery in 5th grade, for admittance beginning in 6th grade. Lottery information can be found on www.bsd405.org. Siblings of students already enrolled get priority, and then names are drawn from the general pool for the remaining spots. International School is not affiliated with the Washington Interscholastic Activities Association (WIAA), and if students want to participate in high school sports, they can do so at their "home school" (the Bellevue School District high school that corresponds with their area of residence). Sports for middle school students are offered through the school and through the same partner as the other middle schools within BSD.

== History ==
International School was founded in 1991 by Bellevue teachers. It was funded with a competitive $300,000 grant from the "Schools for the 21st Century" Commission. International School opened with 150 sixth and seventh graders in the fall of 1991, housed in an old elementary school. Later, the school was moved to its current location in an unused junior high in the Wilburton neighborhood.

== Academics ==
Bellevue International offers a seven-year, seven-subject curriculum, in which students take seven years of humanities (language arts), international studies, math, science, physical education/health, and fine arts. Additionally, students study French for 6–7 years, with the intention of achieving fluency, and ultimately studying subjects such as literature, history, and the Francophone world. Upper-year high school students may slightly adjust their course schedules to include Python, AP Computer Science, Special Topics or AP Computer Science Principles.

Advanced Placement (AP) courses are available to all students, a few of which are mandatory. These include: AP English Language, English Literature, Calculus AB, Calculus BC, World History, US History, Physics 1, Biology, Chemistry, Environmental Science, French Language, Computer Science, Computer Science Principles, and Studio Art (Drawing).

== World Languages Program ==
All students at IS are required to take 6–7 years of French. In the past, German was offered, but due to budget and personnel issues, German was gradually phased out from 2009 to 2014. Historically, about two-thirds of incoming students had taken French and one-third had participated in the German Language Program. Both programs had co-existed successfully since the founding of the International School.

Each year, students at the school put their language skills to use during the optional two-week French exchange with the Saint-Stanislas school in Nantes, available to 10th graders and up. In addition to the language programs, IS has a long-standing partnership with the Amity Institute which places native French speakers with an undergraduate degree and a career goal in education in the school as French language teaching assistants.

== Titan Robotics Club ==
International School participates in FIRST programs through Titan Robotics Club. IS is home to FIRST Robotics Competition (FRC) team 492, FIRST Tech Challenge (FTC) teams 3543 and 6541 (although team 6541 is currently retired), and FIRST Lego League (FLL) teams 2200, 2201, and 12320. The club was founded in 2000 as a way for students at IS to gain experience with Science, Technology, Engineering, Art, and Math (STEAM) as the school offers few engineering-related classes, and it participated in its first competition in the 2001 season.

== Achievements ==
The International School has been ranked 9th in the nation on Newsweek Magazine's list of the best high schools, and currently is first. International School was also selected as a Blue Ribbon National School of Excellence in 2004 by the U.S. Department of Education.

Bellevue's International School has received a top grade in U.S. News & World Report Gold Medal Schools list. The weekly American news magazine ranked high schools nationwide based on college readiness and quality-adjusted exams per test taker. The International School is ranked as the 18th best high school in the country.

== Demographics ==
In the 2017–2018 school year, the total student enrollment for the high school section (grades 9-12) was 312. The racial demographics were: 44% Asian, 2% Hispanic, 12% Multiracial, and 41% White. 26% of students speak another first language besides English. 5% receive special education services, and 4% are eligible for free/reduced price meals.

In the 2017–2018 school year, the total student enrollment for the middle school section (grades 6-8) was 266. The racial demographics were: 1% African American, 43% Asian, 4% Hispanic, 9% Multiracial, and 42% White. 29% of students speak another first language besides English. 5% receive special education services and 9% qualify for free/reduced price meals.

== Notable alumni ==
Cyrus Habib
