= Symetra =

American financial services company

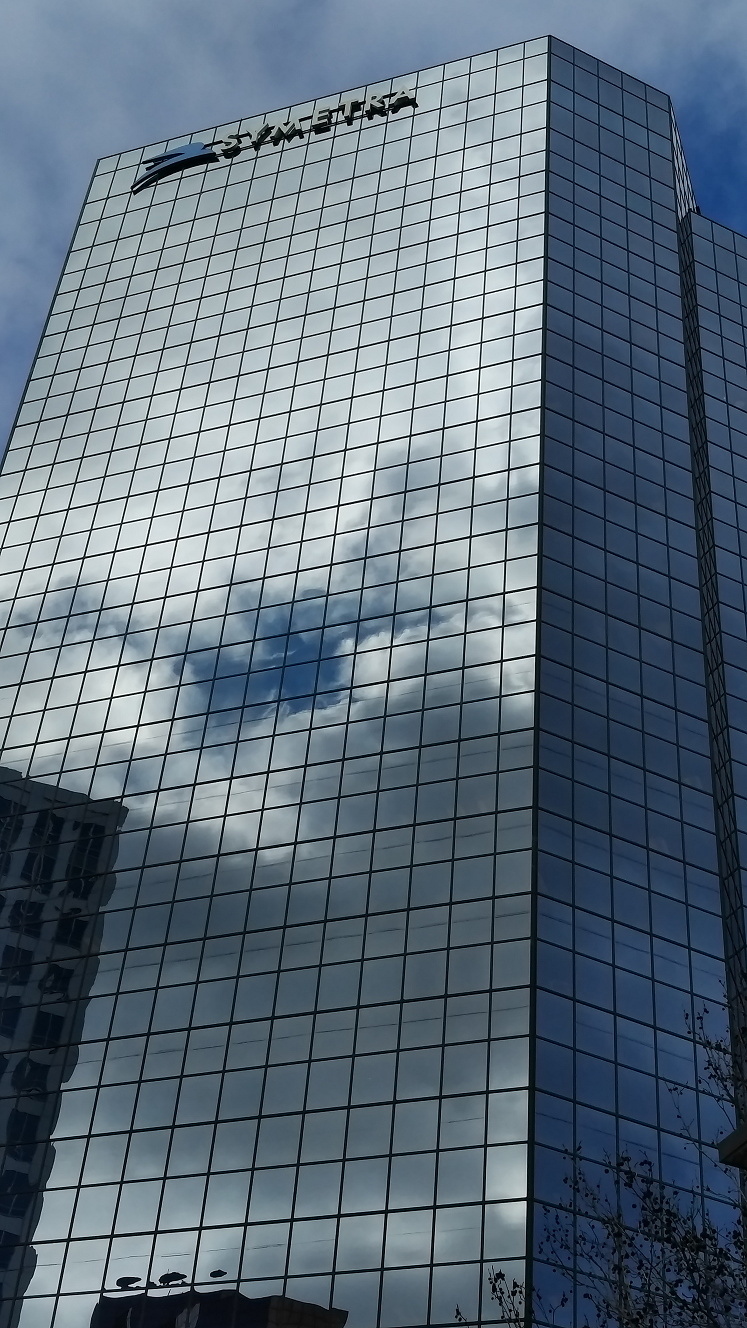
- Symetra headquarters building in Bellevue, Washington
- Company type: Subsidiary
- Industry: Insurance
- Founded: Bellevue, Washington (2004)
- Headquarters: Bellevue, Washington, United States
- Key people: Randall Talbot Founder, Margaret Meister (CEO)
- Products: Retirement plans Employee benefits Annuities; Life insurance
- Revenue: US$ 4.6 billion (2021)
- Net income: US$ 136.8 million (2021)
- Total assets: US$ 29.0 billion (2021)
- Owner: Sumitomo Life
- Number of employees: 1,250
- Website: www.symetra.com

Symetra is an American family of companies providing retirement plans, employee benefits, annuities and life insurance through independent distributors nationwide. The headquarters is in Bellevue, Washington.

== History ==
Started in 1957, Symetra Financial began as a subsidiary of Safeco.

In 1967, the total amount of insurance in force for Symetra surpassed the $1 billion mark. By 1995, the total assets had grown to $10 billion.

In 2004, Safeco sold its life insurance business to an investor group led by White Mountains Insurance Group and Berkshire Hathaway.

Symetra Financial was acquired in 2016 by Japanese insurer Sumitomo Life for $3.8 billion. The Japanese insurer was looking to expand its foothold on insurance especially as its Japanese market ages, increasing costs.

In January 2020, Symetra Financial Corporation announced it established an investment subsidiary, Symetra Investment Management Company (SIM). Sumitomo Life, Symetra's Japan-based parent company, completed its first $500 million investment through a corporate bond fund in December 2019. The standalone entity will focus on managing money for Symetra's corporate parent and the Sumitomo Life Insurance Co to invest in US-based assets.

== Sponsorships ==
Symetra and Women's All Pro Tour hosted the Symetra Tour, which is known as the "Road to LPGA", from 2012 to 2021. Players can earn a promotion to the LPGA by through qualifying school, winning three events in one season, or finishing in the top-10 on the tour.

Symetra Life Insurance is also the first founding partner and sponsor of Seattle's National Hockey League (NHL) expansion franchise, the Seattle Kraken, which began playing in October 2021.

In 2019, Symetra Life Insurance signed a 10-year marquee jersey badge sponsorship with the Seattle Storm (WNBA) team, the largest partnership in franchise history. The company negotiated a separate partnership with WNBA point guard Sue Bird, who appeared in a TV ad for the company's "Jibber Jabber" campaign.
