= Lakemont, Washington =

Neighborhood of Bellevue, Washington, United States

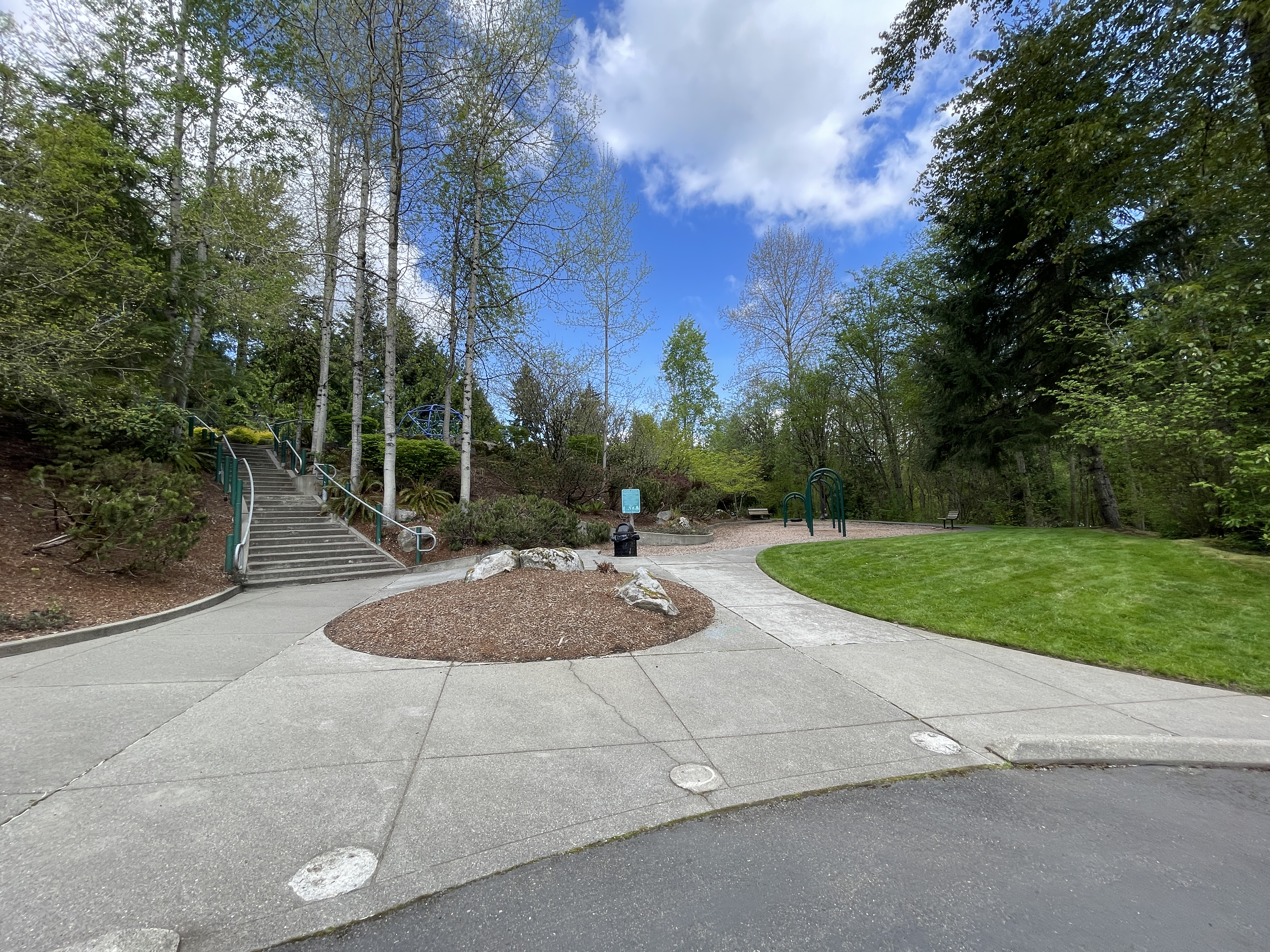
Lakemont Highlands Neighborhood Park in Bellevue

Lakemont is an upscale neighborhood located on the Northern face of Cougar Mountain and is often used to refer to many of the communities on Cougar Mountain centered on Lakemont Park and Lewis Creek Park. The majority of Lakemont is located within the city limits of Bellevue, Washington (ZIP 98006) but part of it also falls within Issaquah, Washington (ZIP 98027). The neighborhood falls fully within the Issaquah School District. Some sections within the Lakemont Community Association include Branderwood, Brighton, Creekside Circle, Longshadow Ridge, Wyngate, Woodcroft, Greystone, Findley Court, Silverleaf, Vuemont Meadows, Collingwood, Sky Mountain, Stratford, Chandler Park, Lakemont Woods, Forest Ridge, the Summit, Belvedere and Lakemont Highlands (Divisions I and II). There is one small shopping center in Lakemont with a variety of stores. Lakemont borders the nearby cities of Issaquah and Newport, and is one of the largest suburban areas of Bellevue.
