= Downtown Bellevue =

Central business district of Bellevue, Washington, U.S.

Coordinates: 47°36′55″N 122°11′53″W

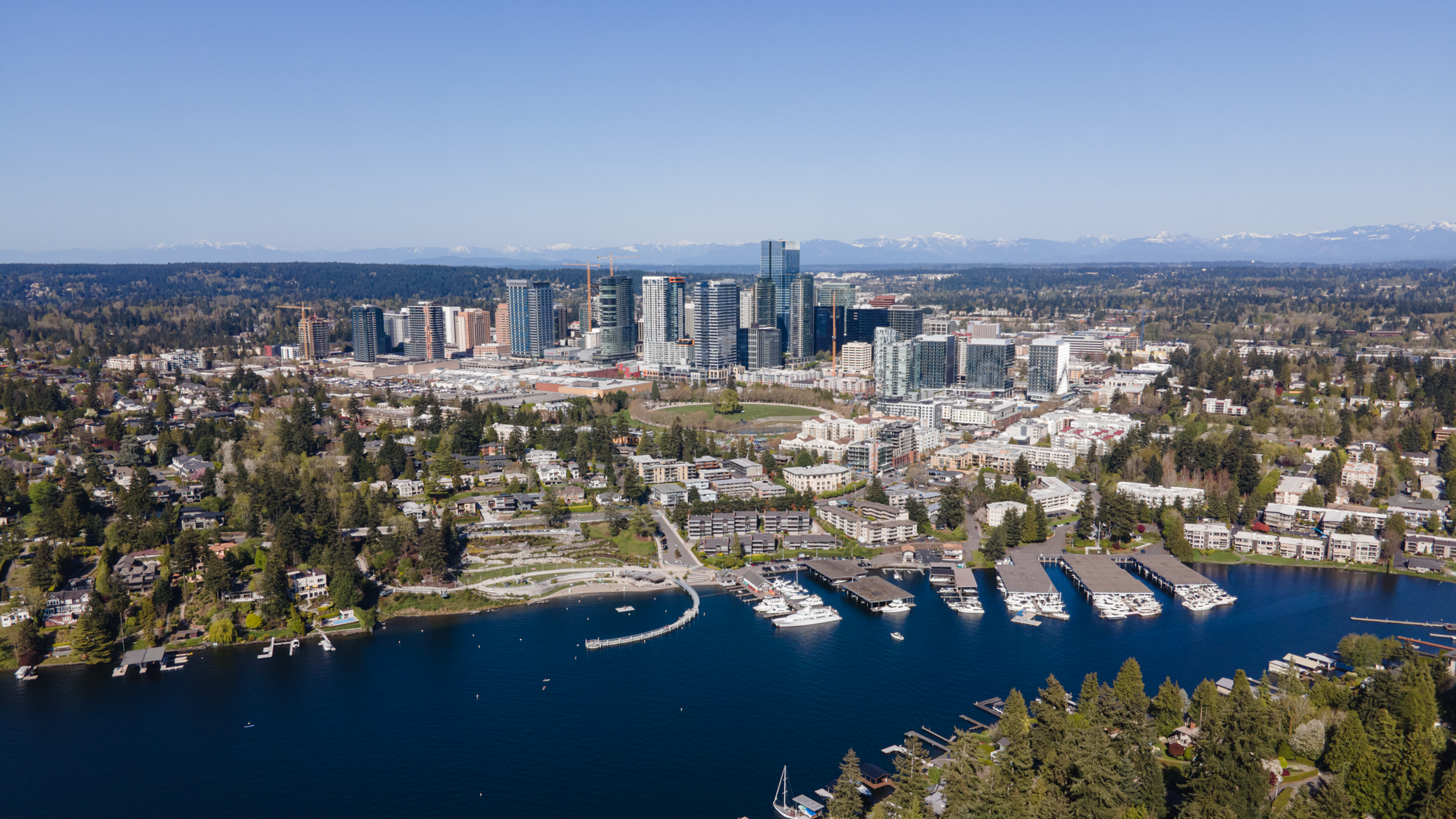
Aerial view of the Bellevue skyline, taken from the west in 2023

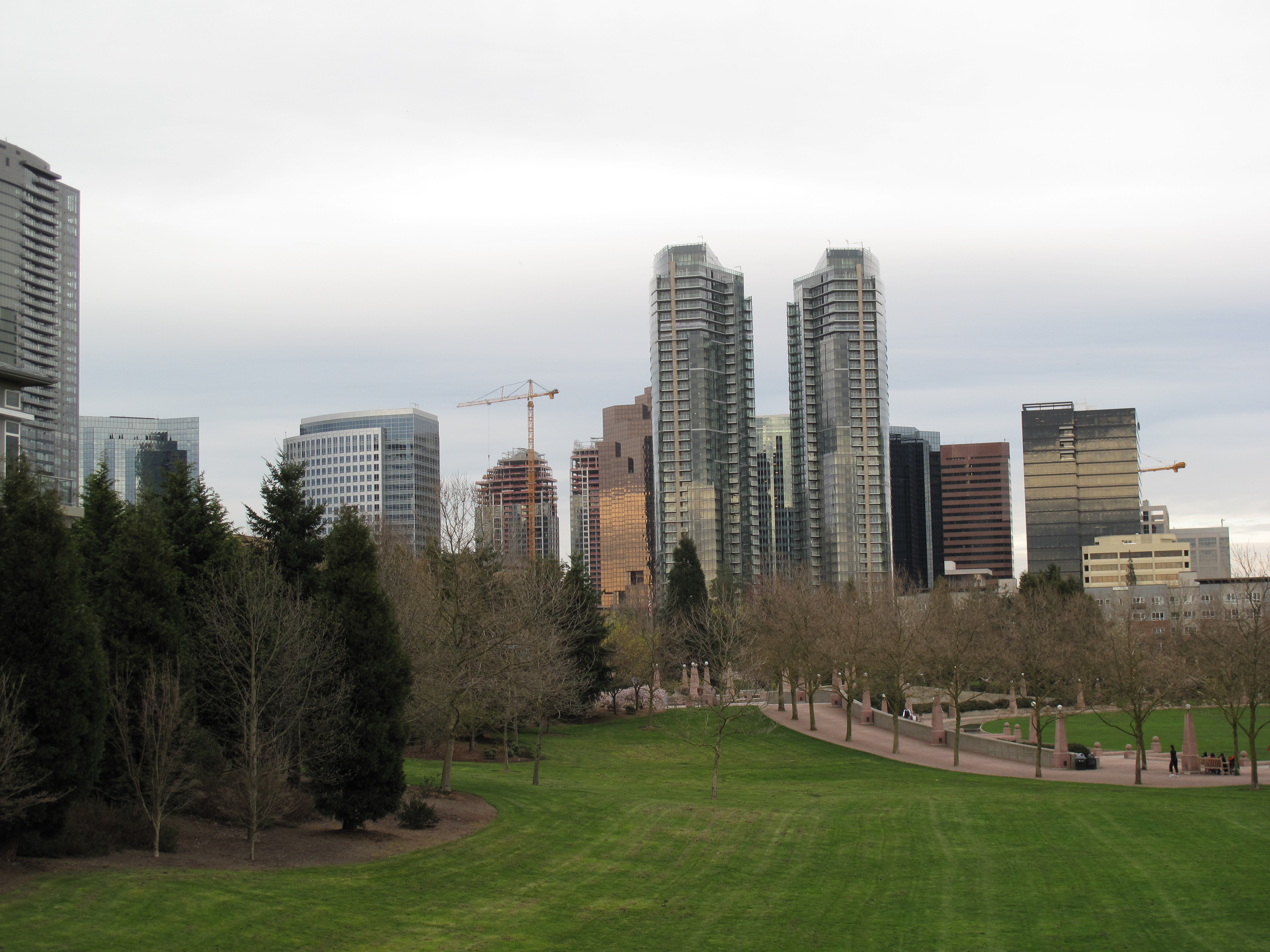
Skyline from Bellevue Downtown Park, 2009

Downtown Bellevue is the central business district of Bellevue, Washington, United States. It is bounded by I-405 to the east, NE 12th Street to the north, 100th Ave NE to the west, and Main Street to the south, and covers an area of around 400 acres (160 ha). It is the second largest city center in Washington state, with more than 50,000 employees and 12,000 residents. Geographically centered near the heart of the Puget Sound region, downtown Bellevue is a regional growth center offering over 9 million square feet (840,000 m^{2}) of Class A office space, various major retail and entertainment locations, more than 2,500 hotel rooms and almost 10,000 housing units.

== Transportation ==
Downtown Bellevue is the main Eastside hub for both the local transit authority, King County Metro, and Sound Transit, the regional transit system. The Bellevue Transit Center, which serves both Metro and Sound Transit buses, is located in the heart of Downtown Bellevue and is connected to Interstate 405 by NE 6th St. with direct-access "Texas-T" HOV ramps. The Bellevue Transit Center is adjacent to the Bellevue Downtown light rail station, which opened in 2024 and which, since the completion of Line 2 in 2026, provides a direct connection to Downtown Seattle. Local buses run through Kirkland, Redmond, Issaquah, Renton, and the University District; regional buses go to Bothell, Lynnwood, Everett, Seattle, Renton, Kent, Auburn and Federal Way, among other cities.

Bellevue Way is the main north–south arterial through downtown. NE 8th St and NE 4th St are the main east–west arterials through downtown. As of June 2010, the 10th St overpass is complete, creating a third bridge over the freeway. Later improvements to I-405 have smoothed the weave of traffic and access to SR-520.

== Retail ==
Anchored by The Bellevue Collection and The Shops at The Bravern, downtown Bellevue is a regional shopping destination. The Bellevue Collection is a trio of mixed-use complexes of shops, offices, hotels, and condos. Bellevue Square, Lincoln Square, and Bellevue Place feature more than 200 shops and restaurants, department stores, and a 16-screen cinema.

Bellevue Square is anchored by Macy's, Macy's Home Store and Nordstrom, later being expanded to feature Uniqlo, Zara, and the Northwest's first 365 by Whole Foods. Opened in 2009, The Bravern is a high-end complex of shops, apartments, and offices located on the eastern edge of downtown adjacent to I-405. The Shops at The Bravern featured the only Neiman Marcus in the Pacific Northwest, which closed in 2020 following the company's bankruptcy, and continues to host the Seattle area's primary concentration of global luxury brand boutiques such as (as of 2017) Hermès, Prada, Louis Vuitton, Gucci, Bottega Veneta, Tods, and Moncler.

Grocery stores in downtown Bellevue include QFC, Safeway and H-Mart. Whole Foods, Uwajimaya and Trader Joe's are located in the Wilburton district just across I-405.

== Parks ==
Bellevue Downtown Park and Rose Garden is a 20-acre (8 ha) park located in southwest downtown Bellevue. It features a half-mile promenade flanked by shade trees along with a stepped canal, rose gardens, grassy fields, and a playground for children. Major holidays and activities are celebrated here, including the annual Bellevue Collection Bellevue Family 4 July, Summer Movie Nights, and the Magic Season Ice Arena. The Downtown Park is undergoing an expansion through the city's "Complete the Circle" project and will soon (2017) feature the Inspiration Playground and Sensory Garden.

Ashwood Park is a smaller green space located near the Bellevue Library, the largest in the King County Library System, and the future home of KidsQuest Children's Museum.

== Economy ==
Downtown Bellevue is the headquarters for several major employers, including Paccar, Eddie Bauer, Valve, Bungie, Apptio, SAP Concur, Symetra Financial and Puget Sound Energy. Although headquartered in the neighboring city of Redmond, Microsoft is downtown Bellevue's largest employer with more than 6,000 workers. Amazon plans to bring 25,000 jobs to downtown Bellevue as part of the planned expansion of its Puget Sound headquarters. The company has committed to about 5.5 million square feet (500,000 m^{2}) of office space through leases and new construction. Meydenbauer Center hosts a variety of major conventions, trade shows, fundraisers, and corporate events. It also features the 410-seat Theatre at Meydenbauer Center.

== Buildings ==
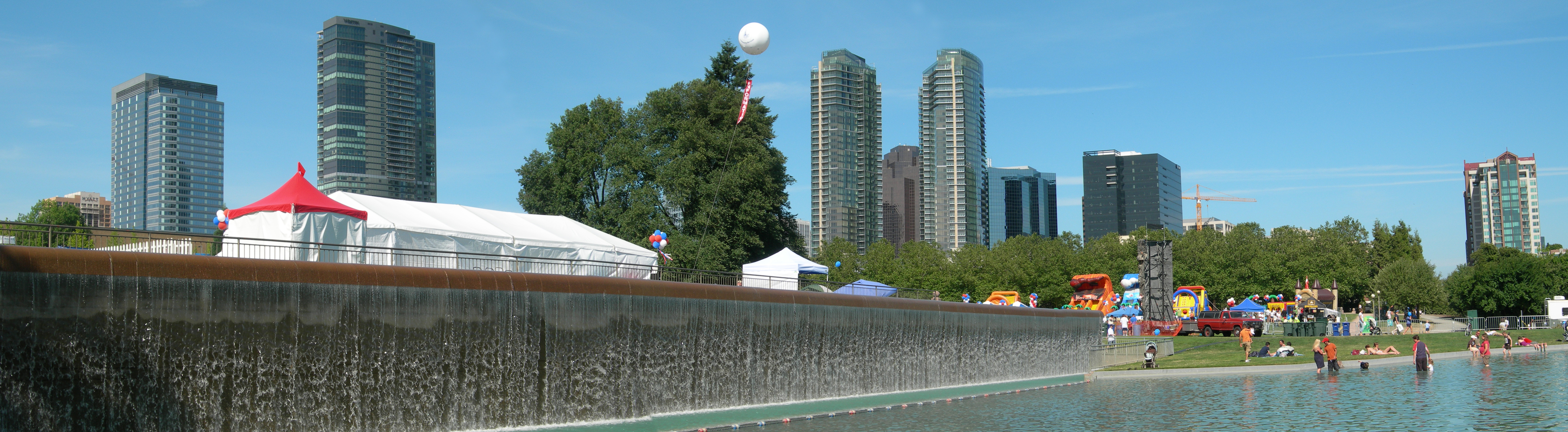
Panorama of the Bellevue skyline from the Bellevue Downtown Park
