= Bellevue, Washington =

Bellevue
- City
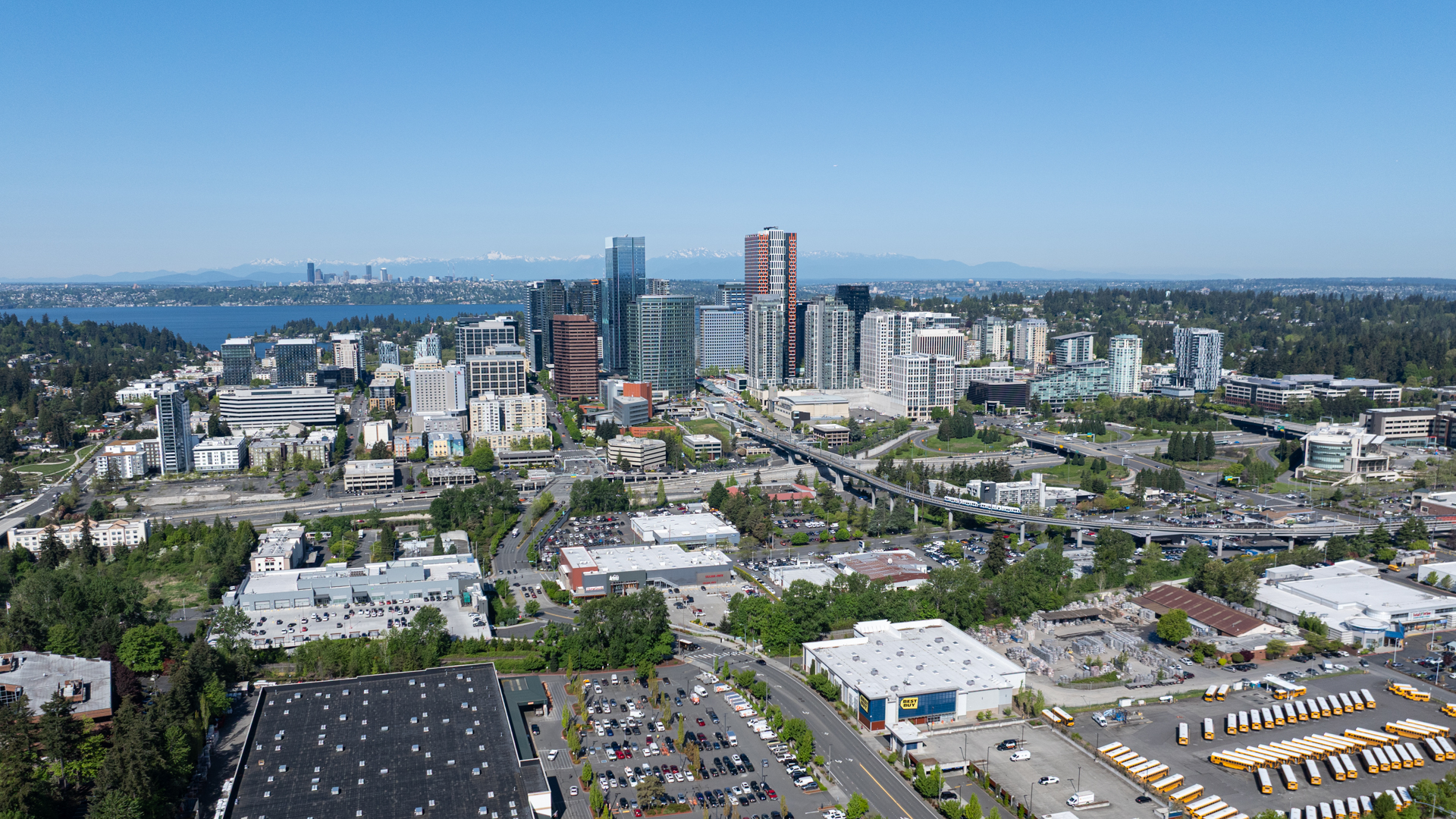
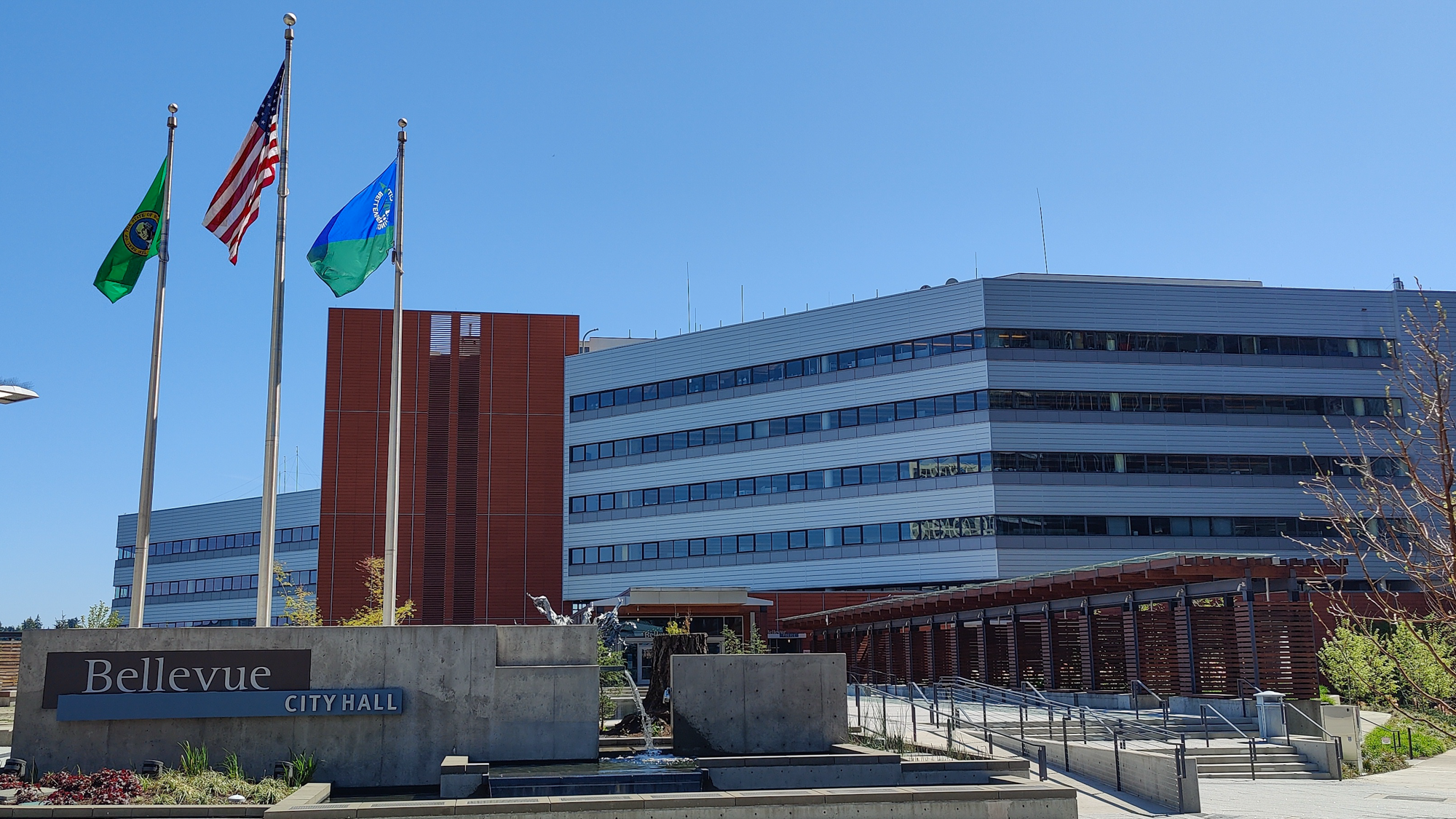
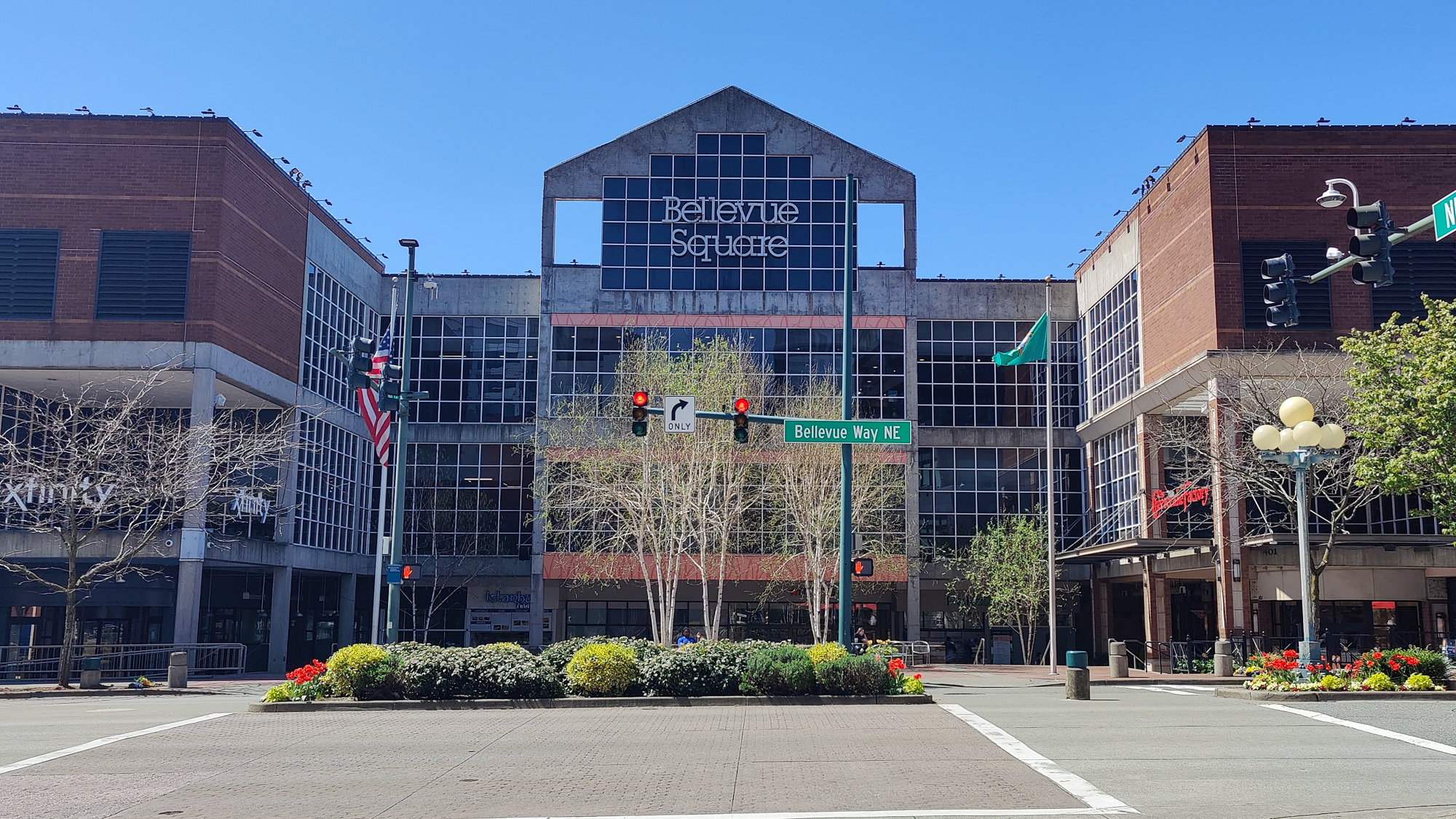
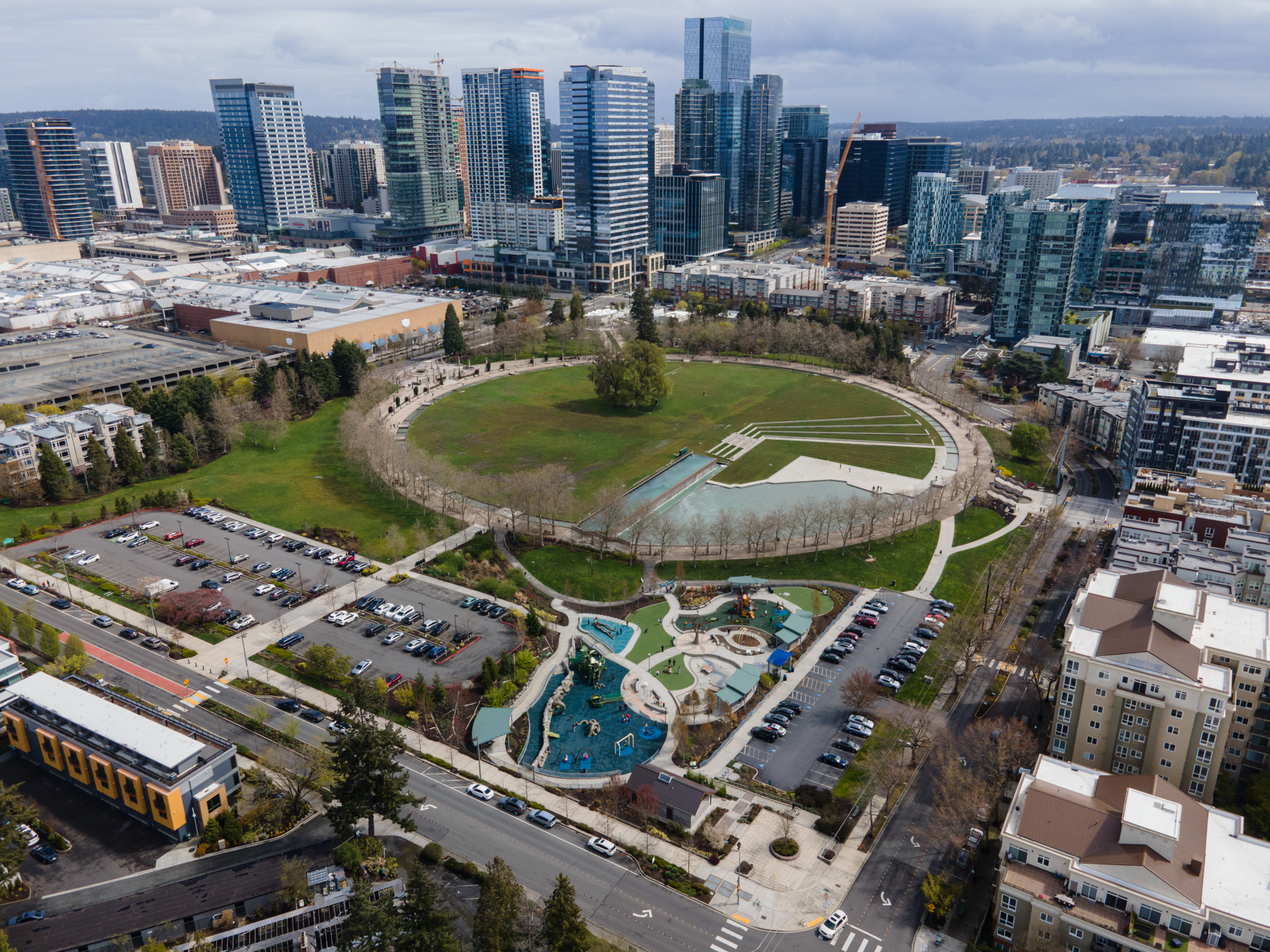
- Aerial view of Downtown Bellevue Bellevue City Hall Bellevue Square shopping center Aerial view of Bellevue Downtown Park

- Seal
- Interactive map of Bellevue
- Location within Washington (state) Location within the United States
- Coordinates: 47°36′52″N 122°09′13″W
- Country: United States
- State: Washington
- County: King
- Incorporated: March 31, 1953

Government
  - Type: Council–manager
  - Body: Bellevue City Council
  - Mayor: Mo Malakoutian
  - Deputy mayor: Dave Hamilton
  - City Manager: Diane Carlson

Area
  - City: 37.505 sq mi (97.138 km^{2})
  - Land: 33.468 sq mi (86.681 km^{2})
  - Water: 4.037 sq mi (10.455 km^{2})
- Elevation: 341 ft (104 m)

Population (2020)
  - City: 151,854
  - Estimate (2025): 154,183
  - Rank: US: 177th WA: 5th
  - Density: 4,530/sq mi (1,749/km^{2})
  - Urban: 3,544,011 (US: 13th)
  - Metro: 4,044,837 (US: 15th)
- Time zone: UTC−8 (Pacific (PST))
  - Summer (DST): UTC−7 (PDT)
- ZIP Codes: 98004-98009
- Area code: 425
- FIPS code: 53-05210
- GNIS feature ID: 2409821
- Website: bellevuewa.gov

Bellevue (/ˈbɛl.vjuː/, BEL-vew) is a city in the Eastside region of King County, Washington, United States, located across Lake Washington from Seattle. It is the third-largest city in the Seattle metropolitan area, and the fifth-largest city in Washington. It has variously been characterized as a satellite city, a suburb, a boomburb, or an edge city. The population was 151,854 at the 2020 census. The city's name is derived from the French term belle vue ("beautiful view").

Bellevue is home to some of the world's largest technology companies. Before and after the 2008 recession, its downtown area has been undergoing rapid change with many high-rise projects being constructed. Downtown Bellevue is currently the second-largest city center in Washington state, with 1,300 businesses, 45,000 employees, and 10,200 residents. In a 2018 estimate, the city's median household income was among the top five cities in the state of Washington. In 2008, Bellevue was number one in CNNMoney's list of the best places to live and launch a business, and in 2010 was again ranked as the fourth-best place to live in America. In 2014, Bellevue was ranked as the second-best place to live by USA Today.

More than 145 companies have been located in Bellevue; companies currently headquartered there include PACCAR Inc, T-Mobile US, and Valve. The technology company Amazon was founded in Bellevue by Jeff Bezos.

== History ==
The Duwamish, whose main settlements were located in present-day Renton and Seattle, maintained a small outpost settlement called Satskal (SAH-tsah-kahl) along the Mercer Slough, south of present-day downtown Bellevue. It was from this village that an attack on the settlers of Elliott Bay was staged. The Duwamish also had a village near Factoria called 'pah-pah-DEEL'.

Bellevue was first settled by European Americans in 1869 by William Meydenbauer and Aaron Mercer, who claimed homestead tracts several miles apart. Both moved away within a few years, and permanent residents did not arrive until 1879. By 1882, a community, consisting mostly of logging homesteaders, had established itself. Once the land had been logged, it was gradually cleared, largely by Japanese immigrant labor in the early 20th century, to support small-scale farming on leased land plots.

By the early part of the 20th century, Bellevue had acquired a reputation as a weekend getaway destination for Seattle residents, who would arrive by ferry at Meydenbauer Bay and spend the day at nearby Wildwood Park. After the ferry landing was moved to Medina, however, tourism to Bellevue waned. To counter this decline, the Bellevue Strawberry Festival was conceived of in 1925, and by the 1930s it had grown to attract as many as 15,000 visitors. At the time, Bellevue was still a small town with around 2,000 residents.

Prior to the opening of the Lake Washington Floating Bridge in 1940, Bellevue was mostly rural farmland area with little development. Although it was small, developers were pushing to change that; in the 1920s, James S. Ditty predicted that it would become a city with a population of 200,000. He envisioned plans that included the bridging of Lake Washington and an area filled with golf courses and airports. His map with these visions was published in 1928. Once the Murrow Memorial Bridge opened, access from Seattle improved, and the area began to evolve into a bedroom community.

In 1942, the Bellevue Strawberry Festival was cancelled. The primary reason was that some 90 percent of the agricultural workforce in the area was of Japanese ancestry, and all of these farmers and their families had been forcibly interned in camps following the start of World War II. The fair would not be revived for another 45 years. Following the expulsion of the ethnic Japanese farming community, a large quantity of farmland became available for development. This made way for the initial development of the Bellevue downtown area.

Bellevue incorporated as a third-class city on the March 31, 1953. Following the 1963 opening of a second bridge across the lake, the Evergreen Point Floating Bridge, the city began to grow more rapidly. The Crossroads community was annexed in 1964. Lake Hills was annexed in 1969. By the 1970 census, Bellevue had become the fourth most populous city in the state of Washington, behind only Seattle, Spokane, and Tacoma.

Bellevue remains one of the largest cities in the state, with several high-rise structures in its core and a burgeoning business community. The city experienced a building boom during the mid-2000s, with the building of developments such as Lincoln Square and the Bravern.

Bellevue Square is located in downtown Bellevue and is now one of the largest shopping centers in the region. Opened in 1946, the mall has undergone several significant phases of expansion since the 1980s.

The city's plans include the Bel-Red Corridor Project, a large-scale planning effort to encourage the redevelopment of 900 acres (3.6 km^{2}) in the large Bel-Red section of the city bordering the adjacent city of Redmond. The plan is similar to the redevelopment of the downtown core with superblocks of mixed-use projects from private developers. These include the Spring District, a mixed-use residential and commercial neighborhood which was developed on 36 acres (15 ha) of industrial land around a future light rail station. The 2 Line of Link light rail was opened from South Bellevue station to Redmond Technology station in April 2024 and an extension to Downtown Redmond opened in May 2025. The line was extended to Seattle in March 2026 over Lake Washington.

== Geography ==
Bellevue lies between Lake Washington to the west and the smaller Lake Sammamish to the east. Much of Bellevue is drained by the Kelsey Creek watershed, whose source is located in the Larsen Lake and Phantom Lake green belt and whose outlet is near where Interstate 90 meets Lake Washington's eastern shore. The city is bisected by Interstate 405 running north–south, and the southern portion is crossed from west to east by Interstate 90. The State Route 520 freeway roughly delineates the upper reaches of Bellevue.

According to the United States Census Bureau, the city has a total area of 37.505 square miles (97.14 km^{2}), of which 33.468 square miles (86.68 km^{2}) is land and 4.037 square miles (10.46 km^{2}) is water.

The city's name is derived from a French term for "beautiful view". Under favorable weather conditions, scenic vistas of the Olympic Mountains and Cascade Mountains can be viewed from hilltops (and strategically positioned high-rise buildings) within the incorporated city.

South of I-90, the city continues up Cougar Mountain, at the top of which is an unincorporated King County location called Hilltop. To the west of Cougar Mountain, Bellevue includes the Coal Creek, Somerset, and Factoria neighborhoods.

Bellevue is bordered by the cities of Kirkland to the north and Redmond to the northeast along the Overlake and Crossroads neighborhoods. Across the short East Channel Bridge, I-90 connects Bellevue to Mercer Island to the southwest. Issaquah is to the east, down I-90 at the south end of Lake Sammamish. The city is bordered to the west by many affluent suburbs such as Medina, Clyde Hill, Hunts Point and Yarrow Point. The south end of Bellevue is bordered by the relatively recently incorporated city of Newcastle, and the city of Renton.

=== Cityscape ===
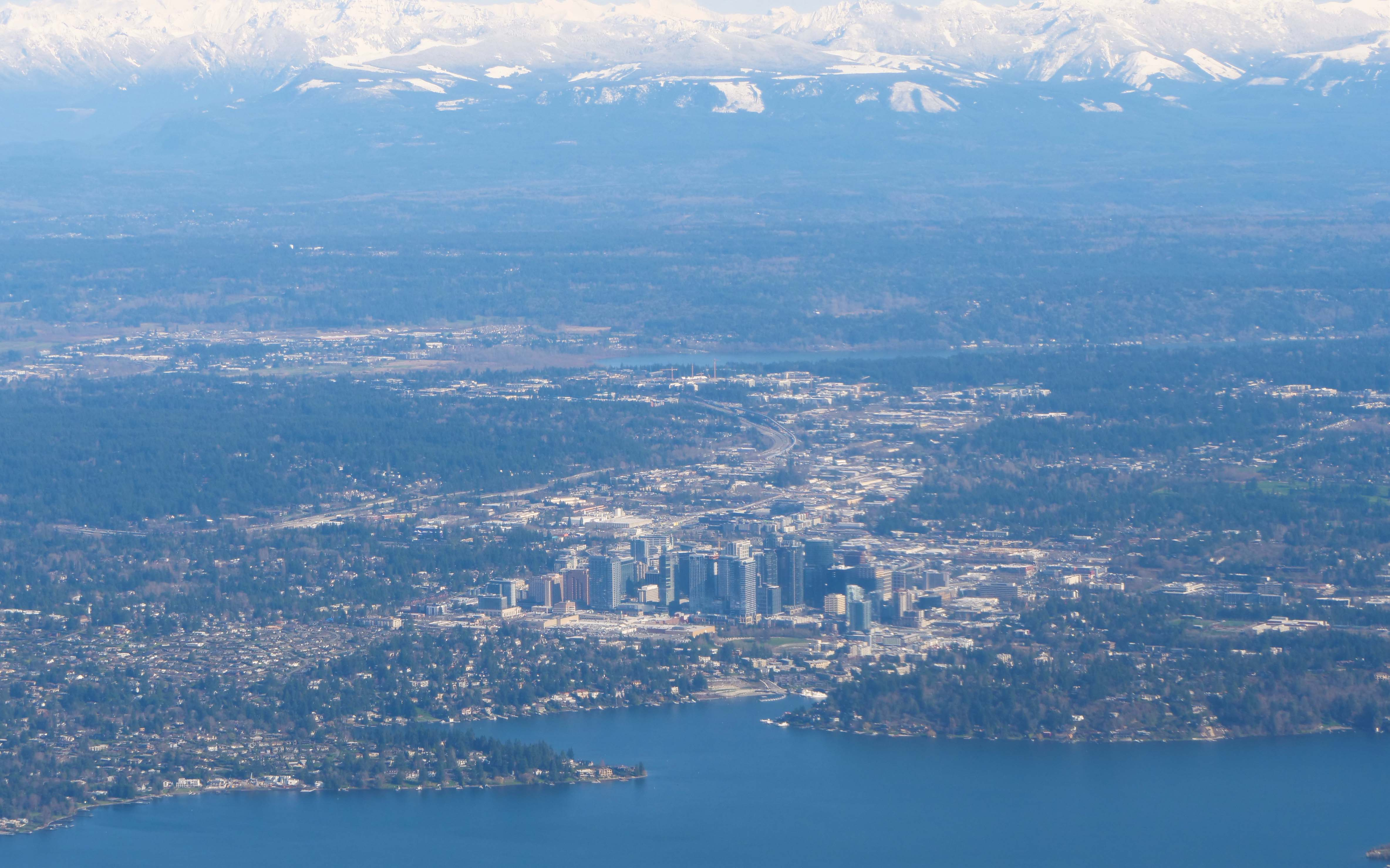
Aerial view of Bellevue skyline

Neighborhoods within Bellevue include Bridle Trails, Cougar Mountain/Lakemont, Crossroads, Downtown, Eastgate/Factoria, Lake Hills, Newport, Northeast Bellevue, Northwest Bellevue, Somerset, West Bellevue, West Lake Sammamish, Wilburton/BelRed, and Woodridge.

=== Climate ===
Bellevue

Climate chart (precipitation, max. and min. temperature)
J	F	M	A	M	J	J	A	S	O	N	D
4.5 43 32	3.7 47 35	3.8 54 38	2.8 58 42	2.1 65 47	1.7 70 52	1 77 55	1 78 57	1.7 71 52	3.3 60 46	4.9 52 40	5.5 44 34
- █ Average max. and min. temperatures in °F
- █ Precipitation totals in inches
Metric conversion
J	F	M	A	M	J	J	A	S	O	N	D
114 6 0	94 8 2	97 12 3	71 14 6	53 18 8	43 21 11	25 25 13	25 26 14	43 22 11	84 16 8	124 11 4	140 7 1
- █ Average max. and min. temperatures in °C
- █ Precipitation totals in mm

Like much of the Puget Sound lowland, Bellevue has a mild oceanic climate (Cfb). It also has frequent rain showers from October to May, with precipitation levels typically being over 2 inches (51 mm). On average, the hottest month is July, while January is the coldest. Bellevue gets an average of 32.02 inches (813 mm) of rain per year, based on data from 1981 to 2013. However, the city published an analysis of rainfall stating that 2016 saw an unusually high 47.14 inches (1,197 mm) of rainfall, and that rainfall in 2014–2016 was trending unusually high. The wet season of 2017, defined as the period from October through April, saw a similar rainfall of 47.26 inches (1,200 mm).

Climate data for Bellevue, Washington
Month	Jan	Feb	Mar	Apr	May	Jun	Jul	Aug	Sep	Oct	Nov	Dec	Year
Record high °F (°C)	65 (18)	70 (21)	78 (26)	89 (32)	93 (34)	108 (42)	105 (41)	100 (38)	100 (38)	90 (32)	75 (24)	64 (18)	108 (42)
Mean daily maximum °F (°C)	43 (6)	47 (8)	54 (12)	58 (14)	66 (19)	70 (21)	77 (25)	78 (26)	71 (22)	60 (16)	51 (11)	44 (7)	60 (16)
Mean daily minimum °F (°C)	32 (0)	35 (2)	38 (3)	42 (6)	47 (8)	52 (11)	55 (13)	57 (14)	52 (11)	46 (8)	40 (4)	34 (1)	44 (7)
Record low °F (°C)	−5 (−21)	−4 (−20)	10 (−12)	27 (−3)	28 (−2)	36 (2)	42 (6)	42 (6)	35 (2)	21 (−6)	4 (−16)	0 (−18)	−5 (−21)
Average precipitation inches (mm)	4.49 (114)	3.67 (93)	3.84 (98)	2.84 (72)	2.10 (53)	1.68 (43)	0.97 (25)	0.97 (25)	1.71 (43)	3.32 (84)	4.92 (125)	5.45 (138)	35.96 (913)
Source 1:
Source 2:

== Economy ==
Bellevue is an economic hub of the Seattle region's Eastside and home to the headquarters of various sizes of companies, including the U.S. operations for many international firms. Since 2005, the city has become a hub for software engineering and other technology development centers. These include PACCAR Inc, T-Mobile US, Eddie Bauer, SAP Concur, and Symetra. Bellevue hosts a number of satellite offices for large technology companies such as eBay, Meta, ByteDance, Oracle, Salesforce, Google, and Microsoft; Microsoft was at one point headquartered in Bellevue but has since moved to the neighboring community of Redmond, Washington. Celebrated video game companies Valve, Bungie, Sucker Punch Productions, and The Pokémon Company International are also based here.

In 2019, Amazon and Facebook announced plans to open large engineering centers in Bellevue with plans to add several thousand employees. In 2018, Google also opened a major engineering facility in downtown Bellevue. As of 2020, there are several high-rise office buildings in Downtown Bellevue that are under construction or in active planning and design phases, including Bellevue 600, part of a major Amazon campus. Several high-rise residential buildings are also planned in downtown, spurred in part by future light rail service, on former retail and low-rise commercial lots. As of 2024, Amazon has 12,000 employees in Bellevue and has reduced its workforce in Seattle.

By the late 2010s, Microsoft had become the largest employer in Bellevue, where it had several offices to supplement its headquarters campus in Redmond. The company's workforce in the city peaked at 9,300 in 2021 and later declined as it consolidated offices at its headquarters and vacated its leased offices pace in Downtown Bellevue and Eastgate. Other technology companies, including ByteDance and The Pokémon Company International, have since expanded their office leases in Downtown Bellevue. From 2021 to 2025, approximately 3.9 million square feet (360,000 m^{2}) of office space was added in Bellevue to accommodate the growing demand that had shifted from Seattle. One of the major factors is the Seattle head tax, which charges employers based on their number of employees.

=== Top employers ===
According to the city's 2024 Annual Comprehensive Financial Report, the largest employers in the city are:

#	Employer	Type of Business	# of Employees	Percentage
1	Amazon	Online retail	14,300	8.68%
2	T-Mobile	Cellular telephone	7,800	4.74%
3	Meta	Online social network	5,400	3.28%
4	Overlake Hospital Medical Center	Medical Hospital	3,800	2.31%
5	Bellevue School District	Education K–12	2,900	1.76%
6	City of Bellevue	Government	1,800	1.09%
7	TikTok	Online social network	1,700	1.03%
8	Salesforce	Business Services	1,500	0.91%
9	Bellevue College	Higher education	1,100	0.67%
10	Pokémon	Video game developer	1,000	0.61%
—	Total employers	—	41,300	25.08%

The city has numerous thriving commercial districts, with four major shopping centers: Bellevue Square in the downtown area, Factoria Mall to the south, Crossroads Mall to the east, and the Overlake Shopping District in the north.

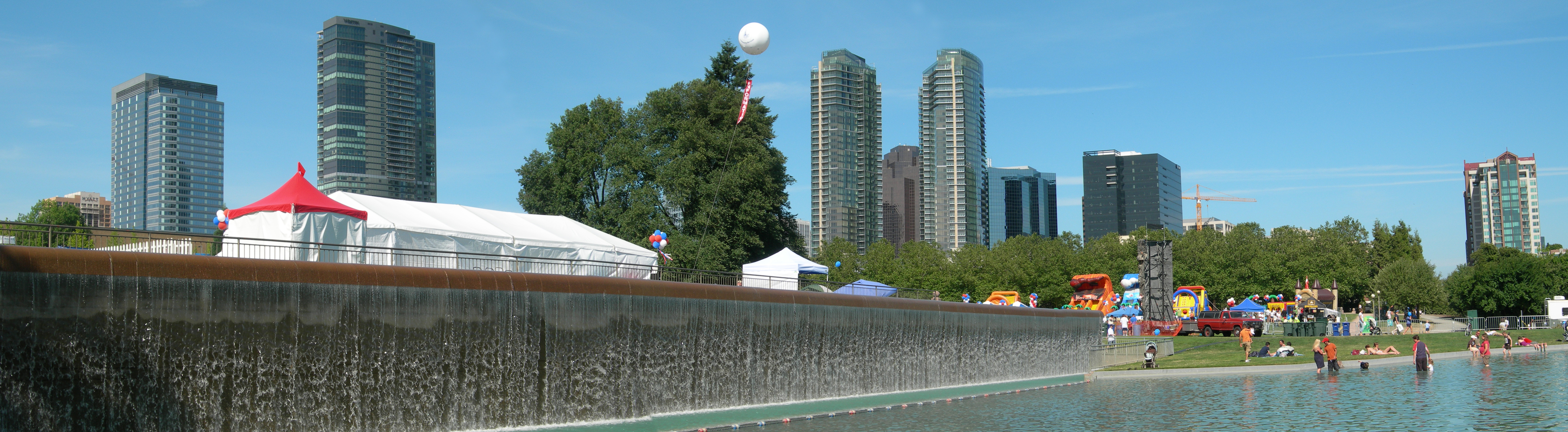
Panorama of the Downtown Bellevue skyline, taken from Bellevue Downtown Park in 2009

== Demographics ==
Historical population
Census	Pop.	Note	%±
1900	254		—
1910	150		−40.9%
1920	1,213		708.7%
1930	1,071		−11.7%
1940	1,177		9.9%
1950	7,658		550.6%
1960	12,809		67.3%
1970	61,196		377.8%
1980	73,903		20.8%
1990	86,874		17.6%
2000	109,569		26.1%
2010	122,363		11.7%
2020	151,854		24.1%
2024 (est.)	154,183		1.5%
U.S. Decennial Census; 2020 Census

As of 2018, one in three Bellevue residents was born outside the United States, most likely due to the prevalence of multinational technology companies in the city. Around 23% of Bellevue's well-educated workforce are in engineering or science-related industries. About half of its residents identify as a person of color or ethnic minority.

According to a 2018 estimate, the median income for a household in the city was $113,698. In a 2020 survey of Centers for Disease Control data, Bellevue was ranked first among small U.S. cities with the highest percentage of physically active adults, with 86 percent reporting that they exercise.

In 2006, Bellevue was rated one of the 25 safest cities in America, based on the per-capita incidence of violent crime.

=== Racial and ethnic composition ===
Bellevue, Washington – Racial and ethnic composition Note: the US Census treats Hispanic/Latino as an ethnic category. This table excludes Latinos from the racial categories and assigns them to a separate category. Hispanics/Latinos may be of any race.
Race / Ethnicity (NH = Non-Hispanic)	Pop 2000	Pop 2010	Pop 2020	% 2000	% 2010	% 2020
White alone (NH)	78,698	72,397	66,063	71.83%	59.17%	43.50%
Black or African American alone (NH)	2,100	2,700	3,918	1.92%	2.21%	2.58%
Native American or Alaska Native alone (NH)	301	349	255	0.27%	0.29%	0.17%
Asian alone (NH)	19,011	33,659	61,539	17.35%	27.51%	40.53%
Pacific Islander alone (NH)	248	219	254	0.23%	0.18%	0.17%
Other race alone (NH)	261	342	821	0.24%	0.28%	0.54%
Mixed Race or Multi-Racial (NH)	3,123	4,152	7,933	2.85%	3.39%	5.22%
Hispanic or Latino (any race)	5,827	8,545	11,071	5.32%	6.98%	7.29%
Total	109,569	122,363	151,854	100.00%	100.00%	100.00%

=== 2020 census ===
As of the 2020 census, Bellevue had a population of 151,854, 60,953 households, and 39,419 families residing in the city. The population density was 4,538.2 inhabitants per square mile (1,752.2/km^{2}).

The median age was 37.2 years. 20.8% of residents were under the age of 18 and 14.1% of residents were 65 years of age or older. For every 100 females there were 102.0 males, and for every 100 females age 18 and over there were 101.3 males age 18 and over.

There were 60,953 households in Bellevue, of which 31.2% had children under the age of 18 living in them. Of all households, 53.2% were married-couple households, 20.0% were households with a male householder and no spouse or partner present, and 21.6% were households with a female householder and no spouse or partner present. About 26.6% of all households were made up of individuals and 8.0% had someone living alone who was 65 years of age or older.

There were 64,688 housing units, of which 5.8% were vacant. The homeowner vacancy rate was 1.1% and the rental vacancy rate was 6.2%.

100.0% of residents lived in urban areas, while 0.0% lived in rural areas.

Racial composition as of the 2020 census
Race	Number	Percent
White	67,930	44.7%
Black or African American	4,018	2.6%
American Indian and Alaska Native	542	0.4%
Asian	61,684	40.6%
Native Hawaiian and Other Pacific Islander	269	0.2%
Some other race	5,096	3.4%
Two or more races	12,315	8.1%
Hispanic or Latino (of any race)	11,071	7.3%

=== 2010 census ===
As of the 2010 census, there were 122,363 people, 50,355 households, and 32,145 families residing in the city. The population density was 3,827.7 inhabitants per square mile (1,477.9/km^{2}). There were 55,551 housing units at an average density of 1,737.6 per square mile (670.9/km^{2}). The racial makeup of the city was 62.6% White, 2.2% African American, 0.4% Native American, 27.6% Asian, 0.2% Pacific Islander, 3.1% from other races, and 3.9% from two or more races. Hispanic or Latino residents of any race were 7.0% of the population.

There were 50,355 households, of which 30.0% had children under the age of 18 living with them, 52.9% were married couples living together, 7.6% had a female householder with no spouse present, 3.3% had a male householder with no spouse present, and 36.2% were non-families. 28.1% of all households were made up of individuals, and 8.4% had someone living alone who was 65 years of age or older. The average household size was 2.41 and the average family size was 2.97.

The median age in the city was 38.5 years. 21.2% of residents were under the age of 18; 7.6% were between the ages of 18 and 24; 30.8% were from 25 to 44; 26.5% were from 45 to 64; and 13.9% were 65 years of age or older. The gender makeup of the city was 50.1% male and 49.9% female.

== Arts and culture ==
=== Cultural events ===
Bellevue is the site of the annual Bellevue Arts and Crafts Fair (originally Pacific Northwest Arts and Crafts Fair), held since 1947 during the last weekend in July.

The biennial Bellevue Sculpture Exhibition draws thousands of visitors to the Downtown Park to view up to 46 three-dimensional artworks from artists around the country.

In celebration of its strawberry farming history, Bellevue holds an annual Strawberry Festival on the fourth weekend in June at Crossroads Park. The festival initially began in 1925, and continued to 1942 when many Bellevue's strawberry farmers were incarcerated as part of the Japanese Internment. In 1987 the festival was resumed as a one evening event, and in 2003 it was expanded back to a multi-day festival.

Bellevue is host to the Northwest Ukrainian International Festival, founded in 2017 and one of the largest Ukrainian culture festivals in the United States. Since the Russian invasion of Ukraine in early 2022, the Grand Kyiv Ballet has been based at the International Ballet Academy in Bellevue.

=== Museums and arts ===
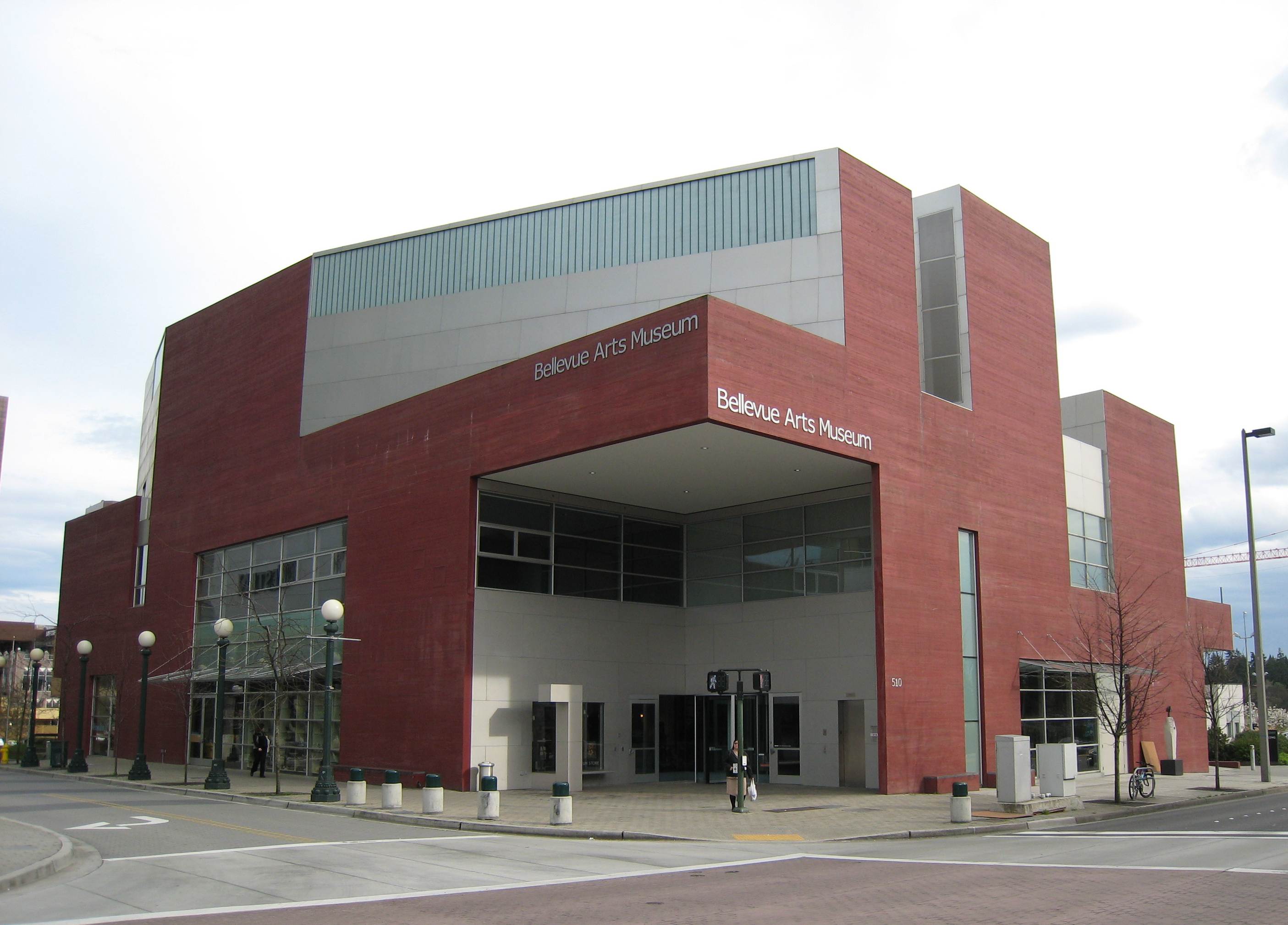
Bellevue Arts Museum

The Bellevue Arts Museum first opened in 1975, then moved to Bellevue Square in 1983. In 2001, the museum moved into its own building, designed by Steven Holl. The museum subsequently ran into financial difficulties and was closed to the public in 2003. After a lengthy fundraising campaign, a remodel, and a new mission to become a national center for the fine art of craft and design, the museum reopened on June 18, 2005, with an exhibition of teapots. The Bellevue Arts Museum closed in September 2024 due to a lack of funding following the COVID-19 pandemic, which cancelled many of its events. It went into receivership and is planned to be either sold or merged with another organization.

The Rosalie Whyel Museum of Doll Art, now closed, contained one of the largest doll collections in the world – more than a thousand dolls – displayed on two floors of a Victorian-style building, which is now the site of the KidsQuest Children's Museum.

Near Interstate 405 is Meydenbauer Center, a convention center that brings corporate meetings and charity events to the downtown area. Meydenbauer also includes a 410-seat theater which attracts operas, ballets, and orchestral performances.

The city government has planned to build a performing arts center, tentatively named the Tateuchi Center (named for philanthropist Ina Tateuchi), since the 1980s. It would include a 2,000-seat concert hall, offices, and creative spaces at a site in Downtown Bellevue. The $200 million project is partially funded with private donations and grants from the city and county governments.

=== Cuisine ===
Since the 2010s, Bellevue has become a hub for Chinese cuisine, especially regional cuisines, with the opening of restaurants in downtown and the eastern neighborhoods of the city. T&T Supermarket, a Canadian chain that focuses on Chinese grocery goods, opened their first U.S. location in Factoria in 2024.

=== Sports and recreation ===
Since the 1970s, the city has taken an active role in ensuring that its commercial development does not overwhelm its natural land and water resources. Today, the Bellevue Parks and Community Services Department manages more than 2,500 acres (10 km^{2}) of parks and open spaces, including the Downtown Park and the Bellevue Botanical Garden, as well as several playgrounds, beach parks, and trails. More than 5,500 Bellevue residents participate in volunteer activities through this department annually.

Bellevue was home to the American Basketball Association team, the Bellevue Blackhawks. The Blackhawks in 2005, despite being ranked 13th in the league, made it to the championship game in front of 15,000 fans in Little Rock, Arkansas. The team has been inactive since 2006.

The city has a small baseball stadium, Bannerwood Park, that has a listed capacity of 700 spectators. The Seattle Redhawks of the Western Athletic Conference, an NCAA Division I baseball team, have played their home games in Bellevue since 2010.

== Government and politics ==
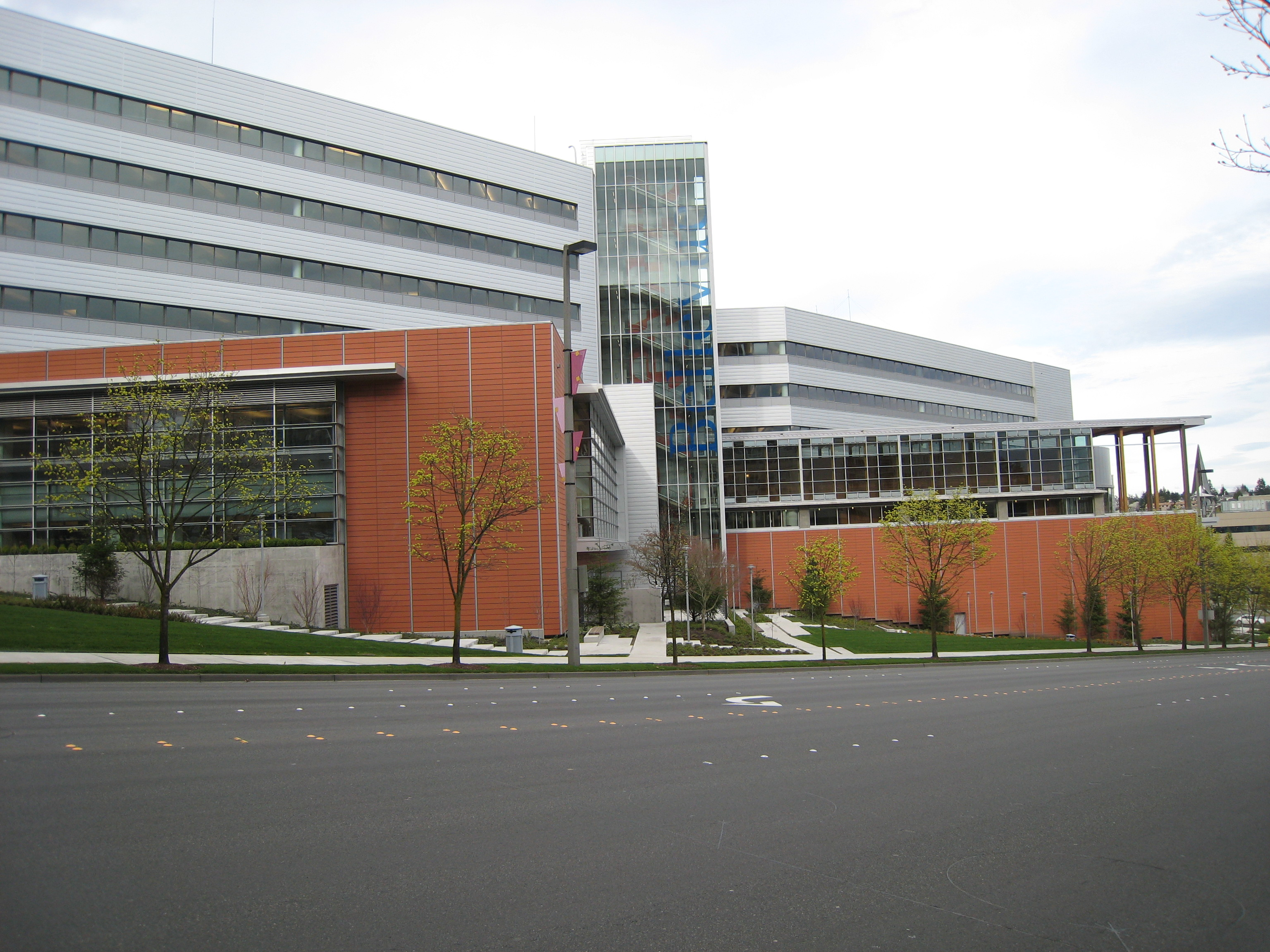
Bellevue City Hall, opened in 2006

Bellevue has a council-manager form of government with seven non-partisan council members elected at large for staggered four-year terms. The City Council selects a Mayor from among its members (not by popular vote), who serves as council chair for two years but has no veto power. As of 2026, the mayor is Mo Malakoutian and the deputy mayor is Dave Hamilton. The mayor administrates council meetings, helps set the issues on the council's meeting agendas, and serves as the city's most visible spokesperson. Operational authority is held by the city manager, who administers the city's day-to-day activities. The city manager is also elected by the seven members of the council instead of by popular vote.

Politically, the city leans strongly Democratic, much like the Seattle/King County area as a whole. Of the 61,742 residents who cast ballots in the 2016 U.S. presidential election, 66.11% voted for Hillary Clinton, compared to 24.58% for Donald Trump.

== Education ==
The vast majority of the city is served by the Bellevue School District. There are four main public high schools – Bellevue High School, Interlake High School, Newport High School, and Sammamish High School – as well as two choice lottery high schools, International School and Big Picture School. Newsweek's 2015 ranking of U.S. public high schools placed Interlake at #359 and Newport at #391, with both schools noted for equitably helping low-income students meet average scores on standardized tests.

Portions of Bellevue also lie within the boundaries of Lake Washington School District, Renton School District and Issaquah School District.

At the higher education level the city is home to Bellevue College, part of the Washington Community and Technical Colleges system.

Bellevue is home to Open Window School, an independent school serving gifted students from kindergarten through eighth grade. The Jewish Day School of Metropolitan Seattle is located in Bellevue, serving students from Pre-Kindergarten to Grade 8. At the elementary level, Bellevue is home to several Montessori schools, the Eastside's only Waldorf education at Three Cedars School, as well as Bellevue Christian School. The Seattle Japanese School, a Japanese weekend supplementary school, holds its classes in Bellevue.

== Infrastructure ==
=== Transportation ===
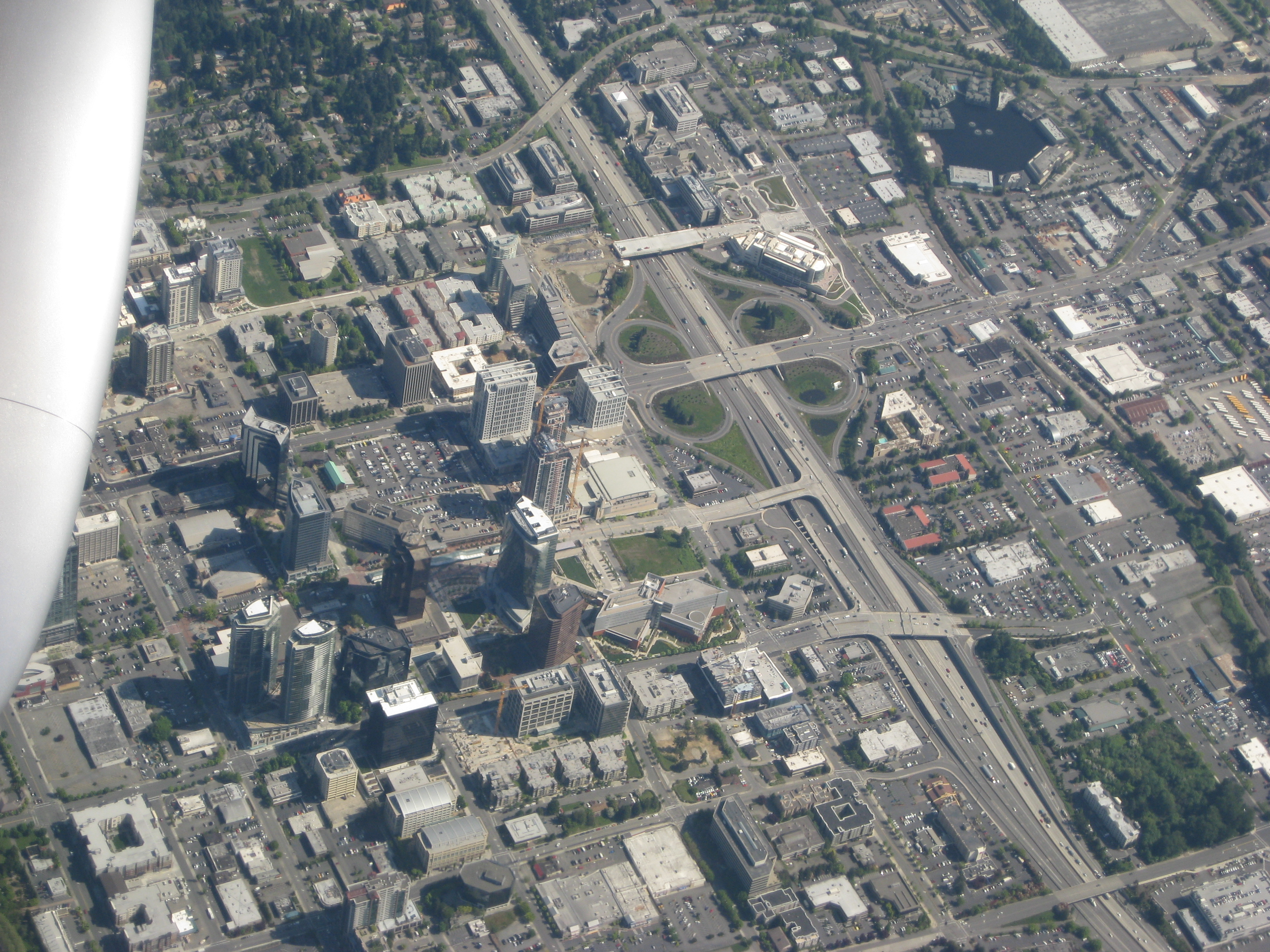
I-405 as seen from the air

Bellevue lies on Interstate 405, the main bypass route for north–south traffic east of Seattle, between its junctions with east–west freeways Interstate 90 and State Route 520. The freeways are connected to Seattle via floating bridges over Lake Washington. Downtown Bellevue has wide streets with few mid-block connections and an incomplete sidewalk network; it has been labeled as "pedestrian unfriendly" and hostile to cycling. The city government adopted plans to improve pedestrian and bicycle connections in 2009 and built the first downtown bicycle lane (including some protected sections) in 2018. The city had 42,000 on-street parking spaces in a 2013 inventory; plans to introduce fees for on-street parking spaces in some neighborhoods were announced in 2025.

Bellevue is the main Eastside hub for both the local transit authority, King County Metro, and Sound Transit, the regional transit system. The Bellevue Transit Center, which serves both Metro and Sound buses, is located in the heart of the downtown business district and is connected to Interstate 405 by Northeast 6th Street and a direct-access ramp to the high-occupancy vehicle lanes. Local buses run into Kirkland, Redmond, Issaquah, Renton, and the University District; regional buses go to Bothell, Lynnwood, Everett, Renton, Kent and Auburn, among other cities. The RapidRide B Line connects the transit center to the Crossroads and Overlake neighborhoods before continuing onward to Redmond. An electric microtransit shuttle service operated by Circuit, Inc. began operating in August 2023; the app-based service is funded by the city's hotel room tax and fare-free for passengers.

The 2 Line of Sound Transit's Link light rail system runs from Lynnwood to Redmond with intermediate stops in Seattle, Mercer Island, and Bellevue. It operates at frequencies of 8 minutes at peak periods on weekdays and every 10 to 15 minutes at other times. The $3.7 billion project was approved by voters in 2008 as part of the Sound Transit 2 ballot measure. It began construction in 2016 and was scheduled to begin service in 2023, but was later delayed due to construction issues. The first section, from South Bellevue station to Redmond Technology station in Overlake, opened on April 27, 2024; the Seattle–Bellevue section opened in March 2026. The 2 Line uses a short tunnel through Downtown Bellevue that was built at the request of the Bellevue City Council and partially funded by a $150 million contribution from the city.

Bellevue was also served by a railroad, a Burlington Northern branch line known as the Woodinville Subdivision, which included the historic Wilburton Trestle. The line is now disused, though part of the track bed at Wilburton Station will be reused by Sound Transit's light-rail construction. Construction of Eastrail, a rail trail on the abandoned Woodinville Subdivision right of way through Bellevue, is planned to be completed in 2023. Some sections of the railroad in Bellevue were demolished in 2008 to make way for the expansion of I-405 and will require the construction of additional structures to supplement the existing right of way.

The city once had an operating airfield named Bellevue Airfield, which shut down in 1983.

== Notable people ==
- Josh Atencio, soccer player
- William S. Ayer, former president and CEO of Alaska Airlines
- Budda Baker, professional football player, safety for Arizona Cardinals
- Steve Ballmer, former CEO of Microsoft, owner of the Los Angeles Clippers
- Sue Bird, former basketball player for Seattle Storm
- Matthew Boyd, Major League Baseball (MLB) pitcher for the Chicago Cubs
- Michael Brantley, MLB outfielder for the Houston Astros
- P. J. Brown, soccer player
- Bobby Bruch, soccer player and coach
- Matt Hague, former MLB first baseman, currently the hitting coach for the Pittsburgh Pirates
- Ricky Horror, guitarist and backing vocalist of Motionless in White
- Peter Horton, actor
- Tim Lincecum, former MLB pitcher
- James Love, Director, Knowledge Ecology International
- Rob McKenna, former Attorney General of Washington
- Fredy Montero, soccer player who represented Colombia
- Satya Nadella, CEO of Microsoft
- Gabe Newell, owner of Valve
- Dave Niehaus, former broadcaster for California Angels and Seattle Mariners, recipient of the Ford C. Frick Award
- John Olerud, former MLB first baseman for Toronto Blue Jays, Seattle Mariners
- Timothy Omundson, actor
- Ann Reinking, Broadway actress, dancer and choreographer
- Larry Sanger, Wikipedia co-founder
- Detlef Schrempf, former All-Star NBA player for Seattle SuperSonics
- Matthew Sheldon, soccer player
- Adam Smith, U.S. representative, former Washington state senator
- Layne Staley, former lead singer of Alice in Chains
- Robert Stock, MLB pitcher for the San Diego Padres, Chicago Cubs, and New York Mets
- Chuck Swirsky, NBA broadcaster for Chicago Bulls, Toronto Raptors
- Matt Tuiasosopo, former MLB baseball player and the current 3rd base coach for the Atlanta Braves
- Ann Wilson, co-founder of Heart
- Nancy Wilson, co-founder of Heart

== Sister cities ==
Bellevue has the following sister cities:

- Hualien, Taiwan
- Yao, Osaka Prefecture, Japan
- Kladno, Czech Republic
- Liepāja, Latvia

== See also ==
- Gontmakher Mansion
- Lakemont, Washington
