= Wild Ones (organization) =

Environmental nonprofit membership association based in the United States

Wild Ones: Native Plants, Natural Landscapes
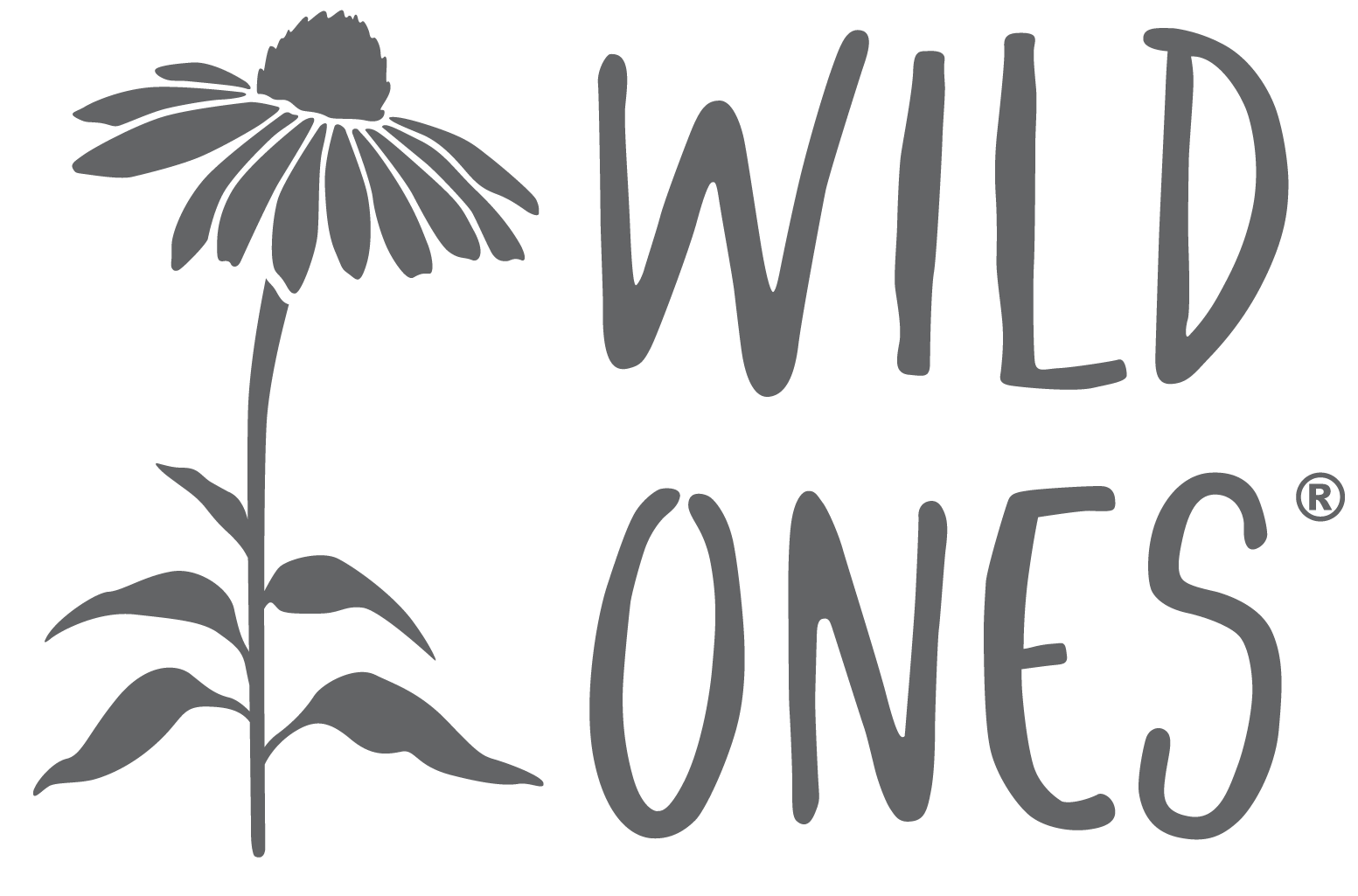
- Founded: 1977 Milwaukee, Wisconsin, USA
- Type: Non-governmental organization
- Tax ID no.: 39-1695443
- Legal status: 501(c)(3) organization
- Purpose: Advocacy, Education, Collaboration
- Location: Neenah, Wisconsin, United States
- Region served: USA
- Website: wildones.org

Wild Ones: Native Plants, Natural Landscapes is a non-governmental, not-for-profit 501(c)(3) organization with a mission to promote environmentally sound landscaping practices and preserve biodiversity.

As of June 2024, Wild Ones has 91 chapters and 29 "seedlings" (prospective chapters) across 34 states in the U.S. to engage in environmental education and advocacy activities.

== History ==
Wild Ones was founded in 1977 by nine people after attending a natural landscaping lecture by Lorrie Otto at the Schlitz Audubon Center.

In 2008, through grant assistance from the Fox River/Green Bay Natural Resource Trustee Council and the Knowles-Nelson Stewardship Fund, Wild Ones established its new headquarters in Neenah, Wisconsin called WILD Center (Wild Ones Institute of Learning and Development).

== Publications ==
A quarterly publication called Wild Ones Journal is available for dues-paying members.

A New Member Handbook for native landscaping is in its 5th edition as of 2010; the 4th edition from 2004 is archived at the EPA.

== Programs ==
Chapter programs include plant rescues, plant sales, garden tours, seed gathering and exchanges, and various outdoor learning projects.

The Lorrie Otto Seeds For Education Grant Program (SFE) provides grants to purchase native seeds and plants and develop outdoor learning centers for youth grades Preschool-12.

== See also ==
- Alaska Native Plant Society
- Arizona Native Plant Society
- Australian Native Plants Society
- Bushcare Group
- California Native Plant Society
- Native Plant Society of Texas
- Native Plant Trust
- North American Native Plant Society
- Lady Bird Johnson Wildflower Center
- Oklahoma Native Plant Society
- Philippine Native Plants Conservation Society
- Tennessee Native Plant Society
- Utah Native Plant Society
- Washington Native Plant Society
