= Bellevue Botanical Garden =

Botanical garden in Bellevue, Washington, United States

Coordinates: 47°36′33″N 122°10′44″W

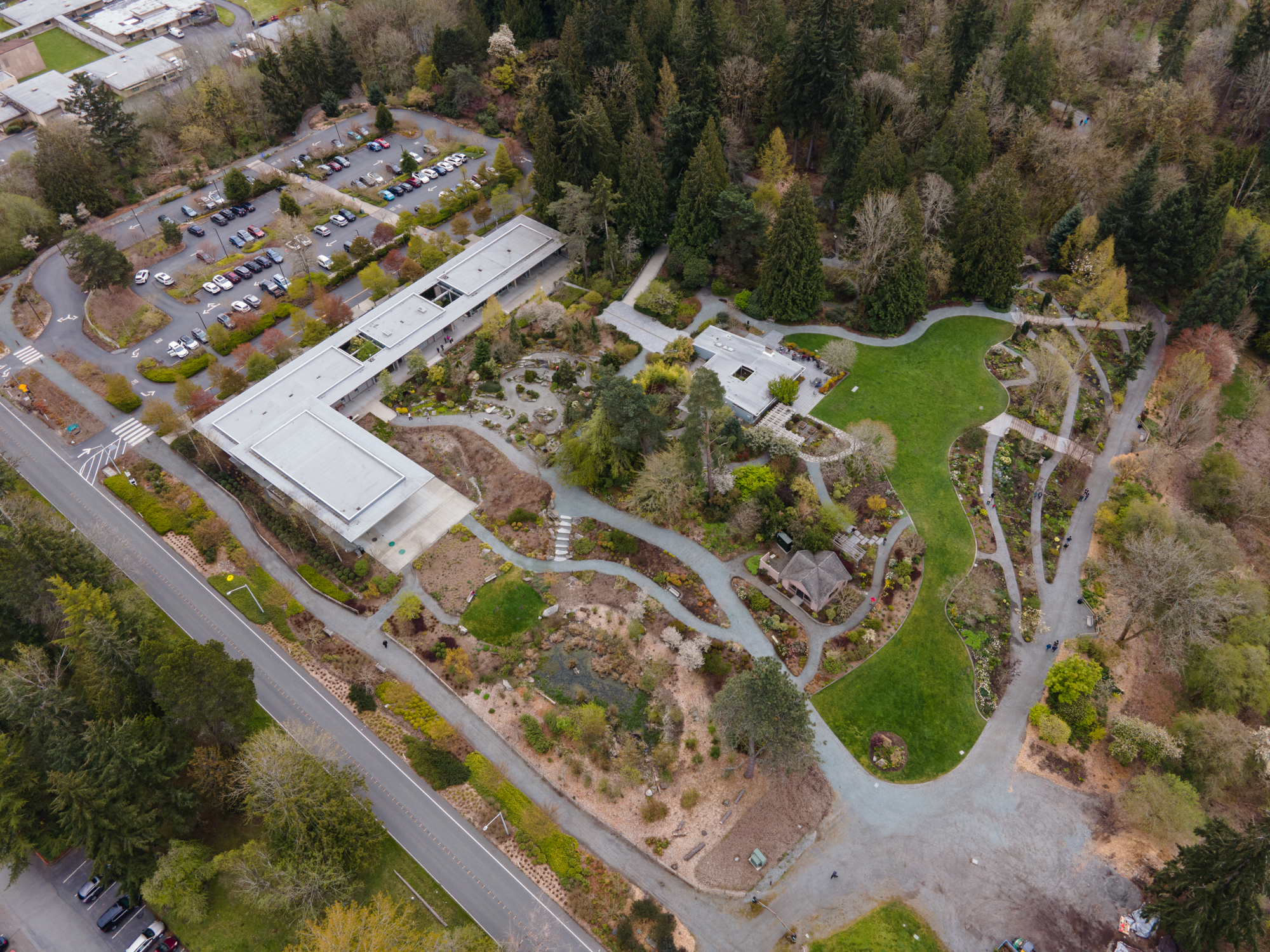
- Aerial view of the gardens.
- Interactive map of Bellevue Botanical Garden
- Type: Botanical garden
- Location: 12001 Main Street, Bellevue, Washington, 98005
- Area: 53 acres (21 ha)
- Website: bellevuebotanical.org

Bellevue Botanical Garden is a botanical garden east of downtown Bellevue, Washington on Main Street. Established in 1992, many different organizations work to maintain the garden to keep it free of charge. What began as a 7-acre gift to the city in the early 1980s has now become a 53-acre public park with multiple gardens. This includes the Fuchsia Garden, Lost Meadow Trail, Native Discovery Garden, Perennial Border, Rhododendron Glen, The Urban Meadow, Waterwise Garden, Yao Garden, and Dahlia Display.

== History ==
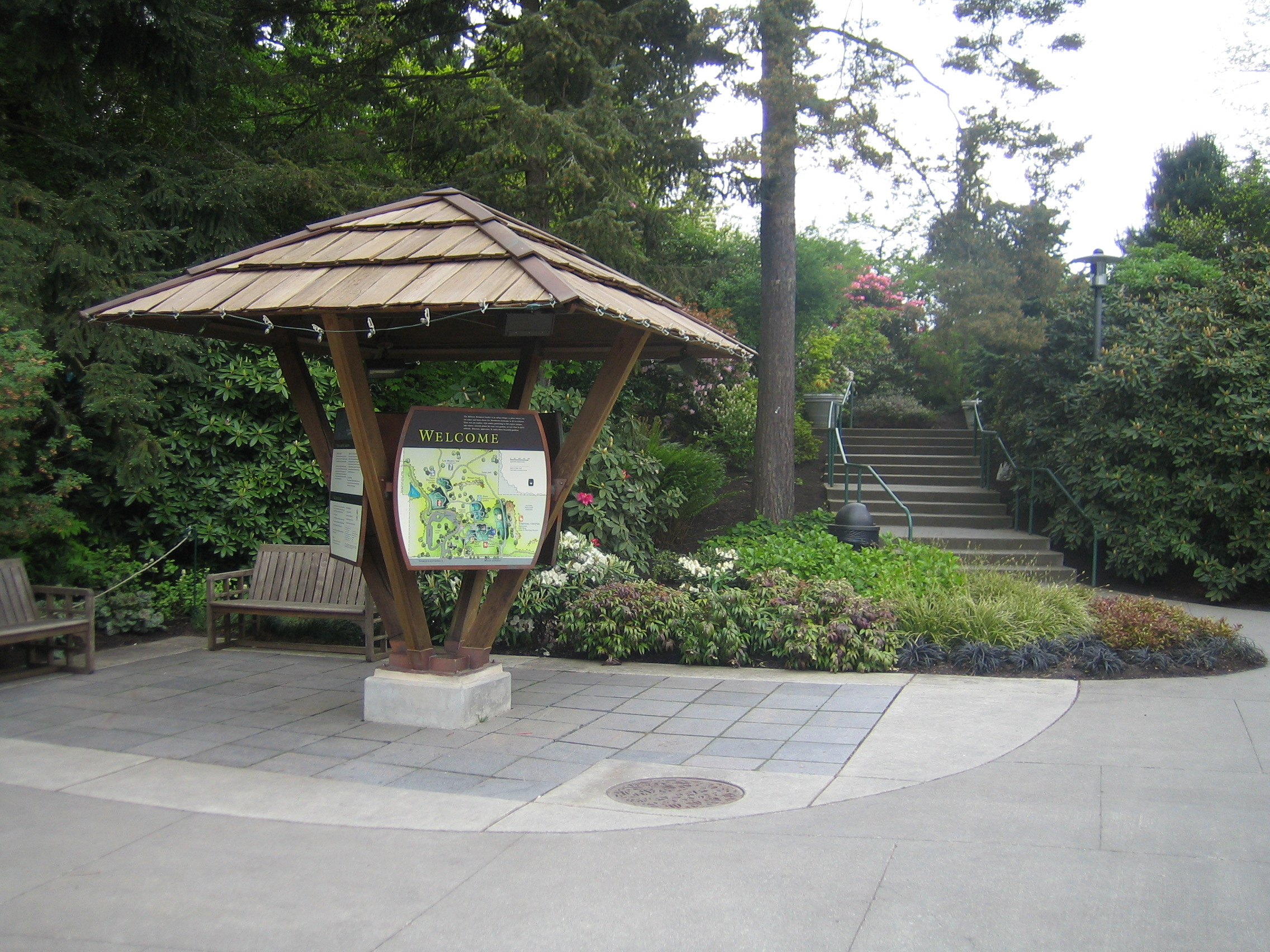
Entrance to the Bellevue Botanical Garden

In 1981, the Shorts family's decision to donate 7.5 acres of their home to the City of Bellevue began the idea for a public space in the city. It wasn't until three years later when the Jewetts family proposed the idea of a botanical garden to Director of Parks and Community Service of Bellevue Springgate that the project began.

From the years 1984-1989 during the planning of the garden, the City of Bellevue sets aside an additional 29-acres of land for this project making the total size of the garden 36-acres. Officially open June 27, 1992, the garden included the Perennial Border, the Yao Garden and the Fuchsia Garden. However, from 1993 to 2007 additional gardens have been built including the Dahlia Display, the Waterwise Garden, the Wildflower Garden, the Alpine Rock Garden, the Native Discover Garden, and the Rhododendron Glen. Development of the garden throughout the years created the purchase of an additional 17 acres in 2006 and a revision of the master plan in 2008. Through partnerships with many organizations to maintenance over the years, the Bellevue Botanical Garden has kept admissions free and celebrated their 25-year anniversary June 2017.

== Featured Gardens ==
=== Native Discovery Garden ===
The Native Discovery Garden highlights native plants of the Pacific Northwest. Because these plants have adapted to the environment, they require low maintenance. According to the Washington Native Plant Society, the purpose of the project was to increase the number of diverse plants. Although 90 percent of the plants are Washington specific, there were 1000 new plants of 120 different species after the renovation in July 2019.

=== Perennial Border ===
Created and maintained by the Northwest Perennial Alliance and volunteers, the Perennial Border is the largest public perennial garden in America. Designed by Charles Price, Glenn Withey, Bob Lilly, and Carrie Becker, the garden is in bloom year-round with plants that grow best in the Pacific Northwest. The American style garden features perennials, bulbs, grasses, trees, and shrubs along the stairs and paths of the garden.

=== Yao Garden ===
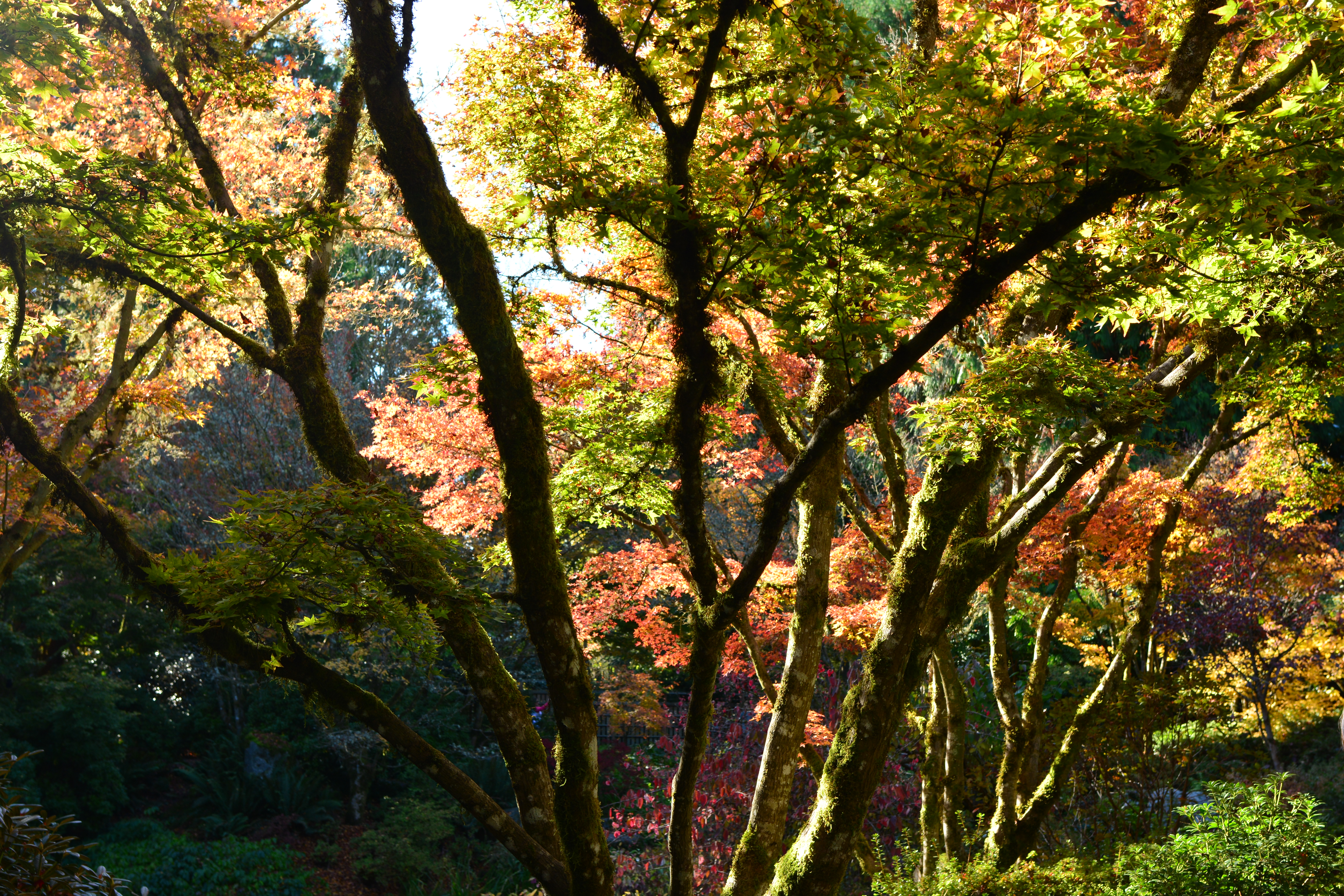
Yao Garden

The Yao Garden is a Japanese themed garden that hosts plants from the Pacific Northwest, Japan, and around the Pacific Rim. Although formerly a detention for water, the space now consists of a small river stream surrounded by maples, azaleas, rhododendrons, and viburnums.

Originally part of Kelsey Creek Park in 1971, the Yao Garden relocated as the botanical garden project began in 1990. Part of the Bellevue Sister Cities Association (BSCA) along with four other cities including Yao Japan; the organization works to cultivate relationships on an international level. Since 1977 BSCA has sponsored an exchange program between students from Bellevue and students from Japan.

=== Urban Meadows ===
Opened in March 2017, the Urban Meadow features various grasses, perennials, a wetland, and a mason bee box. Both native and exotic plant species are included in this cultivated meadow for a natural look and year-round highlights. Being a garden that was added to the Bellevue Botanical Garden collection, later on, designer Jil Stenn found a way to blend the new Urban Meadow with the surrounding gardens including the Waterwise Garden, Iris Rain Garden, and Rock Garden. Although the project had a rough start due to rainfall, it was completed before the Bellevue Botanical Garden's 25th-anniversary celebration. Contributors take pride in the colors displayed throughout the year, the animal sightings, no chemical uses in the garden, and the dedication of benches and trees to honor loved ones.

== Bellevue Botanical Garden Society ==
Started by the same individuals that initiated the Bellevue Botanical Garden project—Bob and Iris Jewett—the garden is run on an all-volunteer basis and collaborates with various organizations to maintain each garden. The society aims to inspire their guests in the community share about ecology and horticulture through education programs in Bellevue. Various classes and events are organized regularly including the holiday lights festival as a tangible way to teach and inspire community members.

== Gallery ==
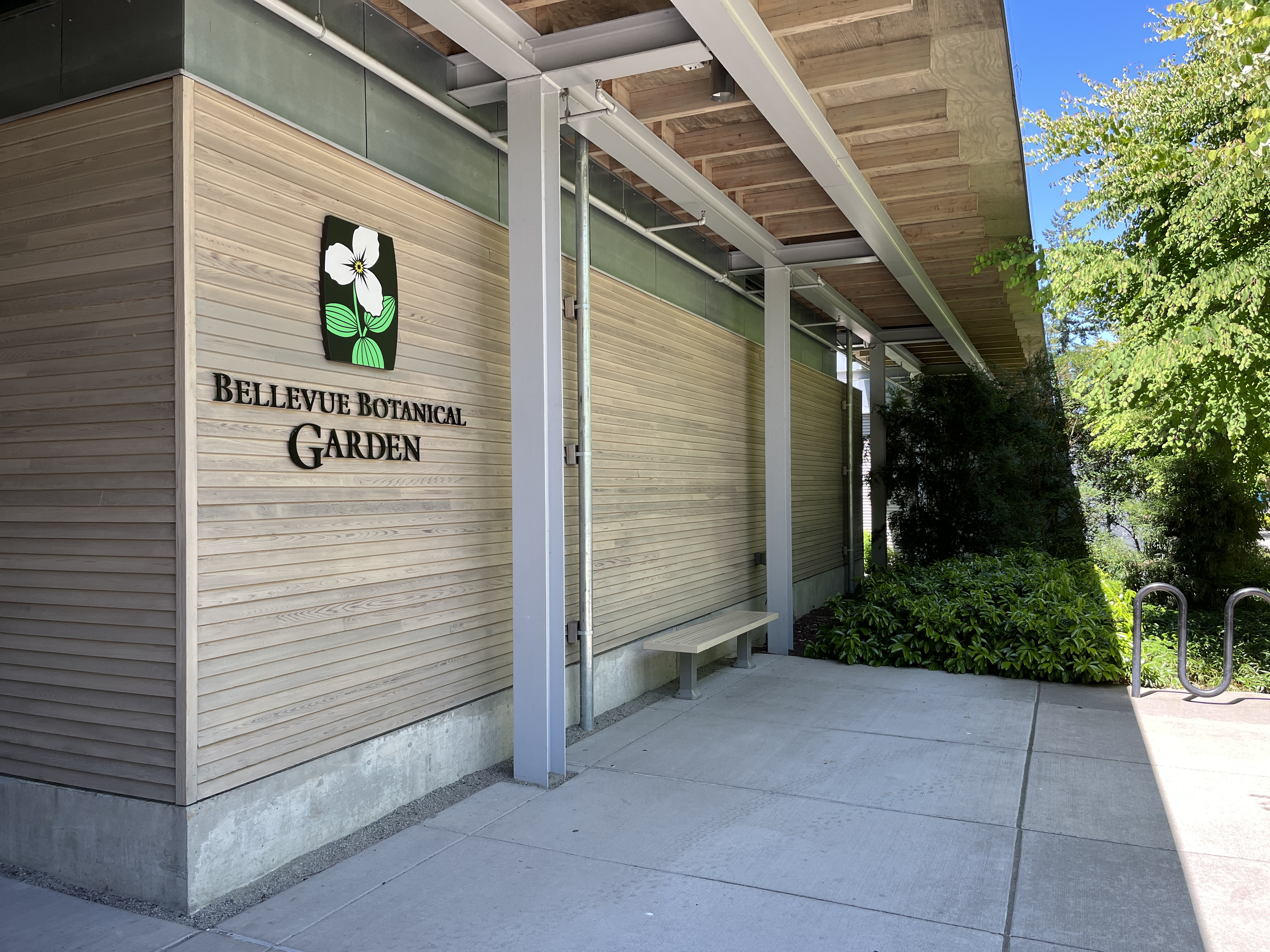
Entrance area.

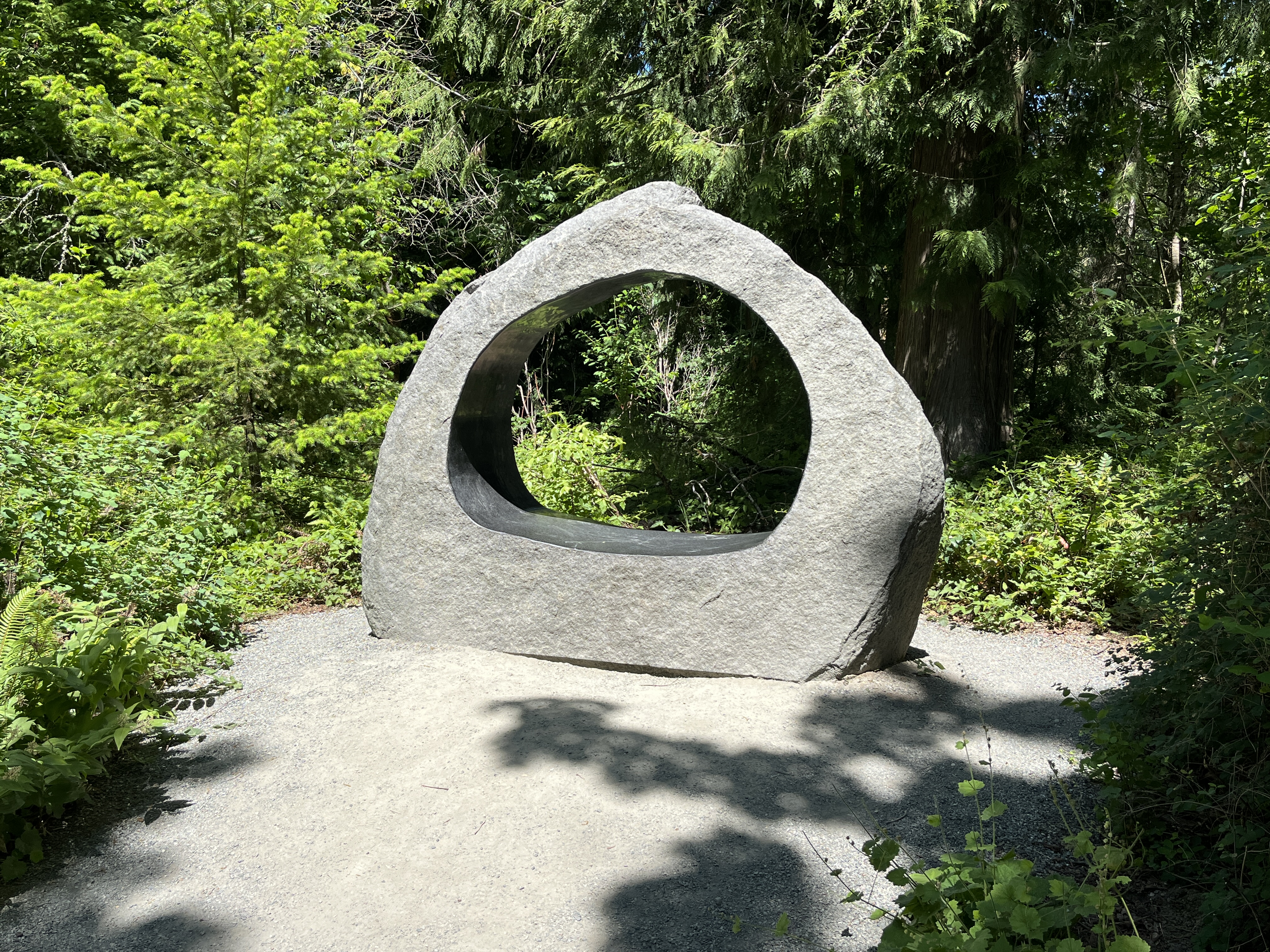
Artwork in a garden.

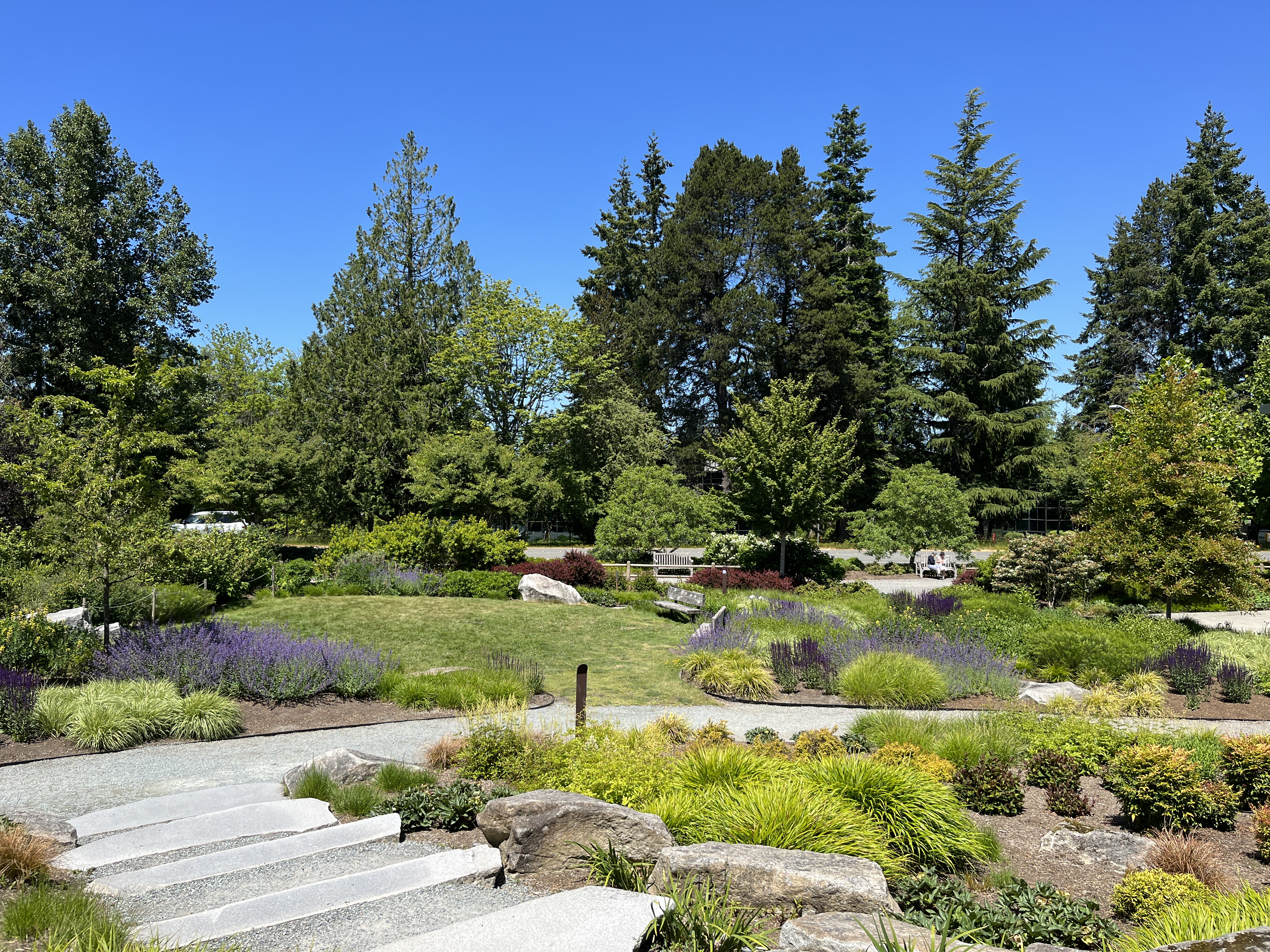
View of one of the gardens.

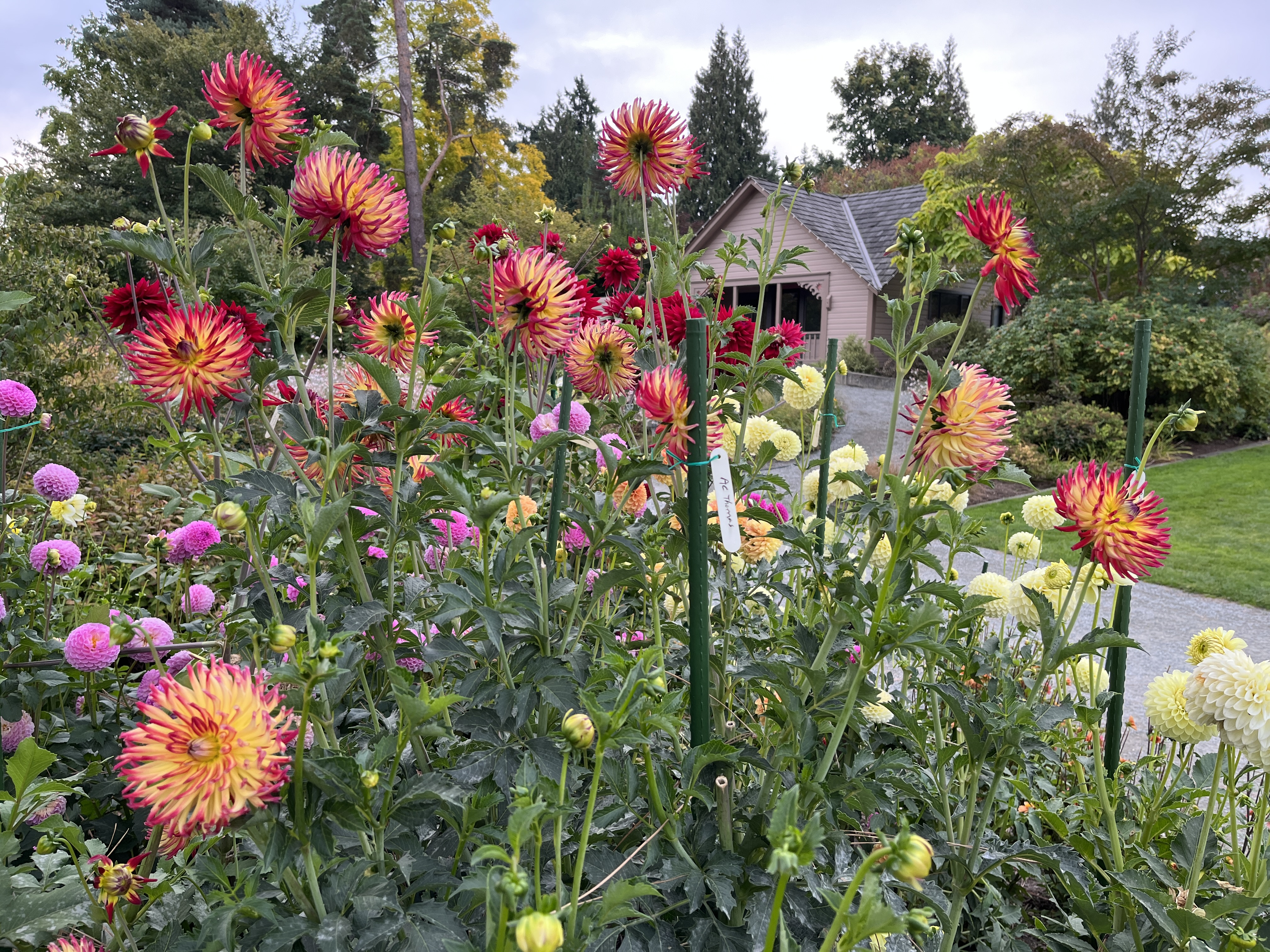
Flowers along a path.

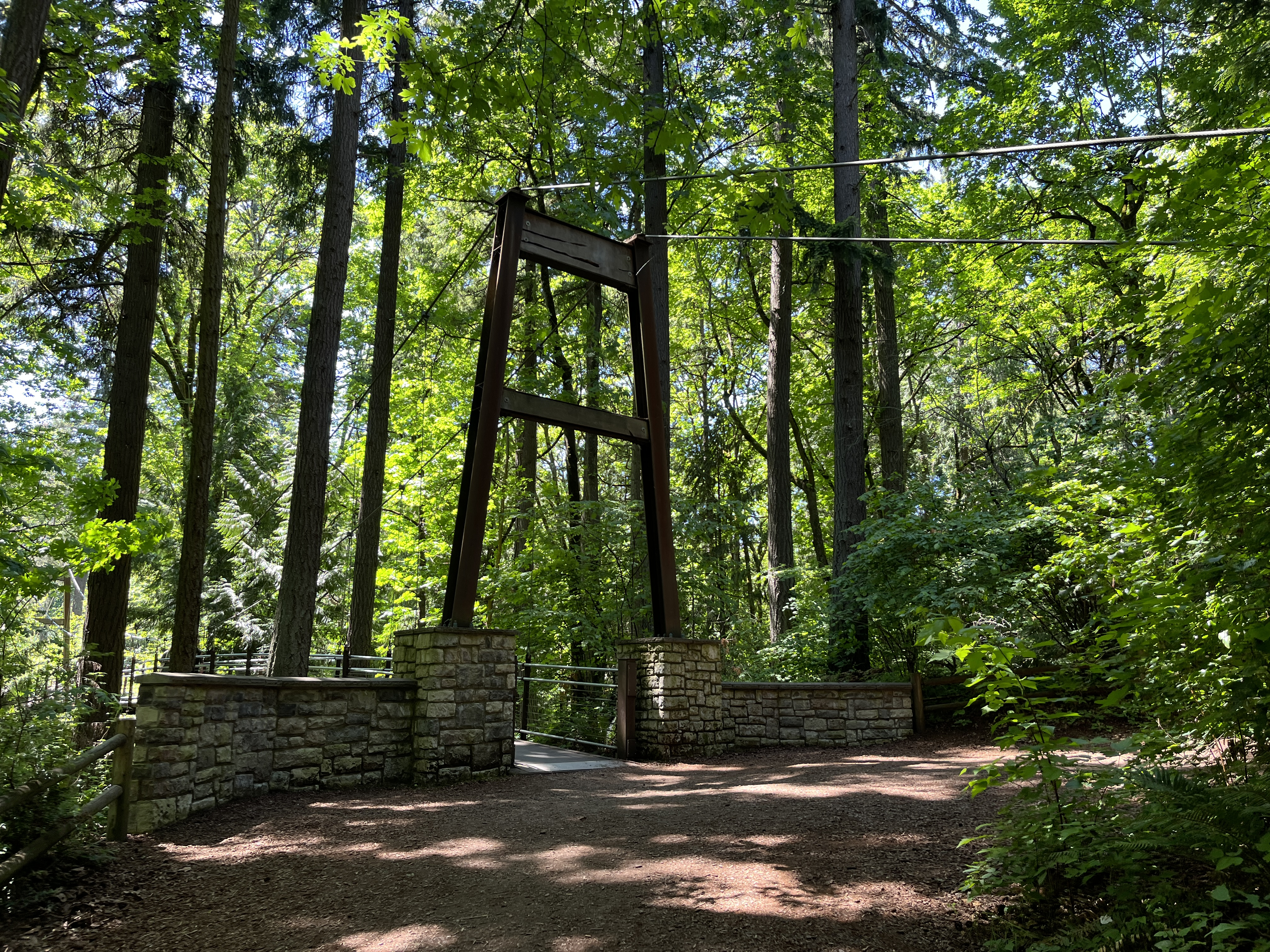
The Ravine Experience.

== See also ==
- List of botanical gardens in the United States
