= Natural landscaping =

Use of local plants in landscaping

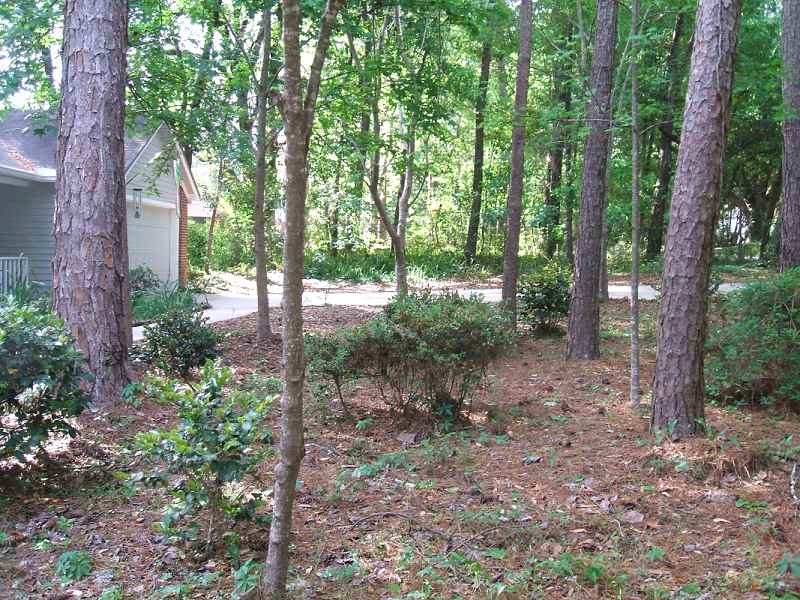
Natural landscaping using pine, redbud, maple, and American sweetgum with leaf litter.

Natural landscaping, also called native gardening, is the use of native plants including trees, shrubs, groundcover, and grasses which are local to the geographic area of the garden.

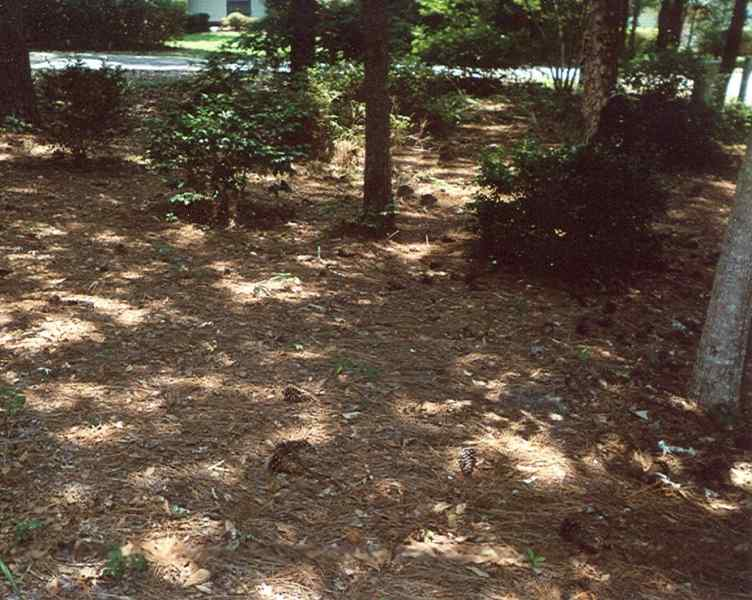
Natural landscaping with pine leaf litter mulch

== Benefits ==
=== Maintenance ===
Natural landscaping is adapted to the climate, geography and hydrology and should require no pesticides, fertilizers and watering to maintain, given that native plants have adapted and evolved to local conditions over thousands of years. However, these applications may be necessary for some preventive care of trees and other vegetation.

Native plants are suitable for "low-maintenance" gardening and landscaping, with many species being vigorous and hardy and able to survive winter cold and summer heat. Once established, they can flourish without irrigation or fertilization, and are resistant to most pests and diseases.

Many municipalities have quickly recognized the benefits of natural landscaping due to municipal budget constraints and reductions and the general public is now benefiting from the implementation of natural landscaping techniques to save water and create more personal time.

=== Ecology and habitat ===
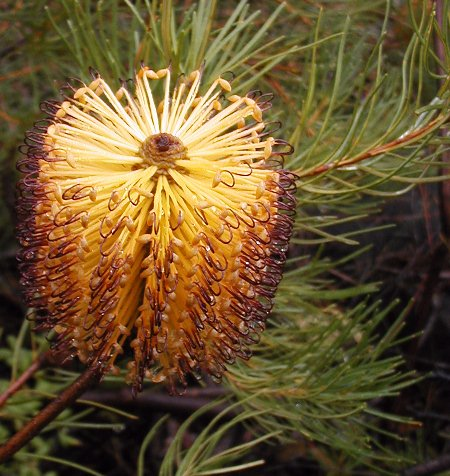
Banksia spinulosa, a Sydney local plant which attracts wildlife

Native plants provide suitable habitat for native species of butterflies, birds, pollinators, and other wildlife. They provide more variety in gardens by offering myriad alternatives to the often planted introduced species, cultivars, and invasive species. The indigenous plants have co-evolved with animals, fungi and microbes, to form a complex network of relationships. They are the foundation of their native habitats and ecosystems, or natural communities.

Such gardens often benefit from the plants being evolved and habituated to the local climate, pests and herbivores, and soil conditions, and so may require fewer to no soil amendments, irrigation, pesticides, and herbicides for a beautiful, lower maintenance, and more sustainable landscape.

==== Habitat challenges ====
However, while local provenance plants have adapted to local conditions (which includes climate, soil, and other native plants and animals), there will often be instances, especially in cities, where one or more of these will have been radically altered.

Examples include:

- Building rubble used as landfill may raise soil pH (i.e. create alkaline soil), which can be problematic in regions of acidic soils (with local plants adapted to acid soils).
- Buildings cast a substantial shade, this may give rise to conditions substantially shadier than needed by local plants.
- Soil which is high in organic material and nutrients is often introduced into gardens, or many gardeners will have used fertilizers. Plants from some areas may not thrive under these conditions. For example, many Australian plants are particularly sensitive to phosphorus.
- Many native plants are adapted to, and benefit from, periodic wildfires that occurred before and during pre-modern settlement. These fires can be simulated in the garden by either "high mowing" or a controlled burn every few years.

Many weeds in an area are usually the result of imported plants. These plants become invasive because there are no natural controls such as disease, weather, or fauna in their new environment. They take over native habitats, reducing shelter and food for local fauna. Using local provenance plants increases the biodiversity of and is important for the health of a region's overall ecology.

Much of the wild areas have been destroyed to make room for urban development. Housing developments have replaced native habitats with ornamental plants and lawns, pushing the wildland–urban interface further out. While development won't be stopped, gardeners can keep wild areas and green spaces filled with native species on their lots and in their communities.

Despite this, there are usually plenty of indigenous or native plants which will grow and thrive in the area one is trying to establish a native garden.

==== Native plants ====
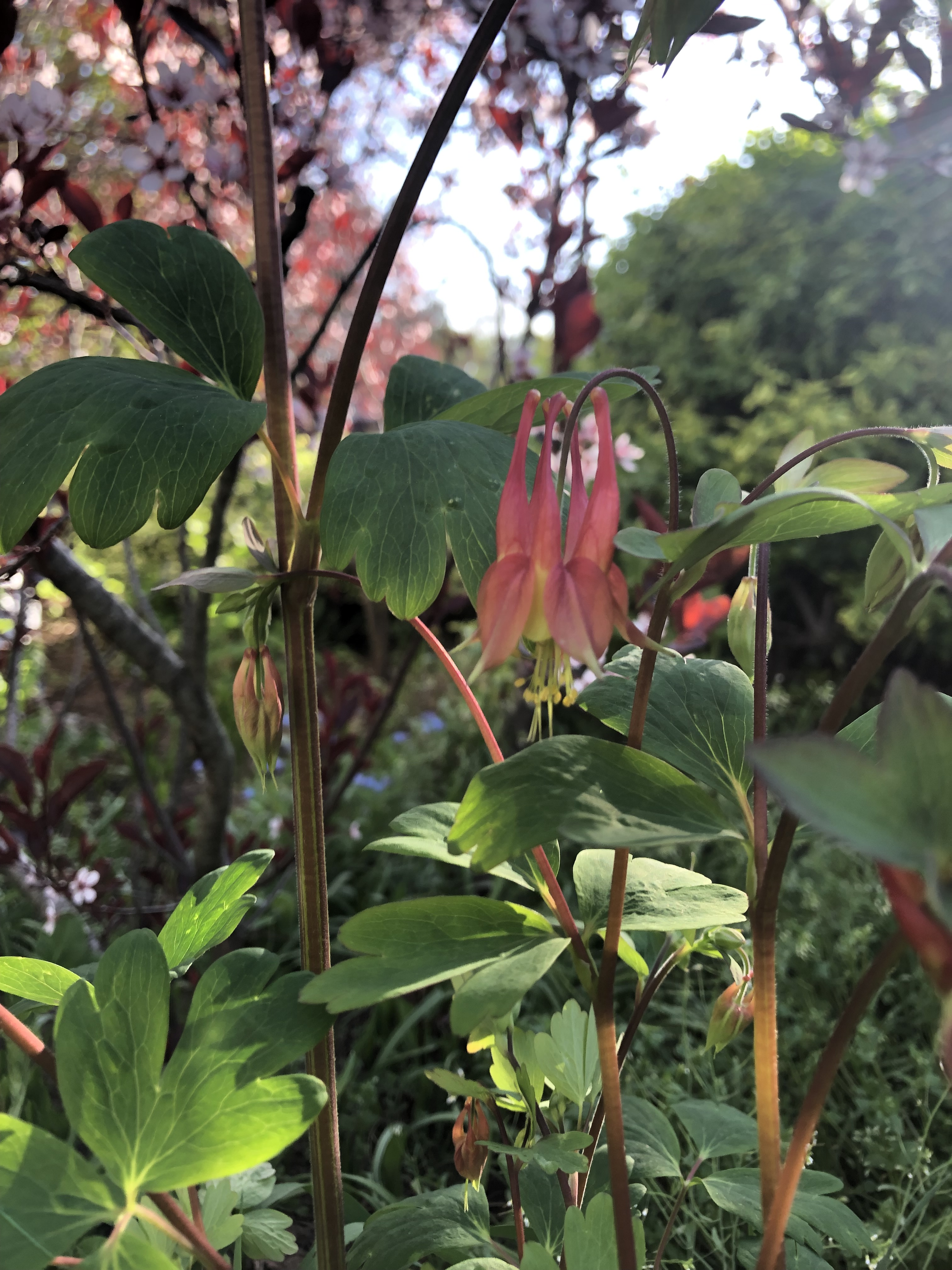
Native plant to Canada, Red Columbine - Aquilegia canadensis

The use of native plants in a garden or landscape can both preserve and protect natural ecosystems, and reduce the amount of care and energy required to maintain a healthy garden or landscape. Native plants are adapted to the local climate and geology, and often require less maintenance than exotic species. Native plants also support populations of native birds, insects, and other animals that they coevolved with, thus promoting a healthy community of organisms.

Plants in a garden or maintained landscape often form a source population from which plants can colonize new areas. Avoiding the use of invasive species helps to prevent such plants from establishing new populations. Similarly, the use of native species can provide a valuable source to help these plants colonise new areas.

Some non-native species can form an ecological trap in which native species are lured into an environment that appears attractive but is poorly suited to them.

However, in Britain research by the University of Sheffield as part of the BUGS project (Biodiversity in Urban Gardens in Sheffield) has revealed that for many invertebrates – the majority of wild animals in most gardens – it is not just native plants which can sustain them. The findings were published in popular form in Ken Thompson's book No Nettles Required: The truth about wildlife gardening. He confirms the approach which Chris Baines had promoted in How to Make a Wildlife Garden.

Some ecosystems may benefit from any increase in biomass, from the introduction of certain non-native species, or any increase in biodiversity. In the case of disturbed areas some exotic/non-native plants may fare better than the displaced, native inhabitants, in the process increasing the biodiversity and biological biomass.

== Types ==
=== In general ===
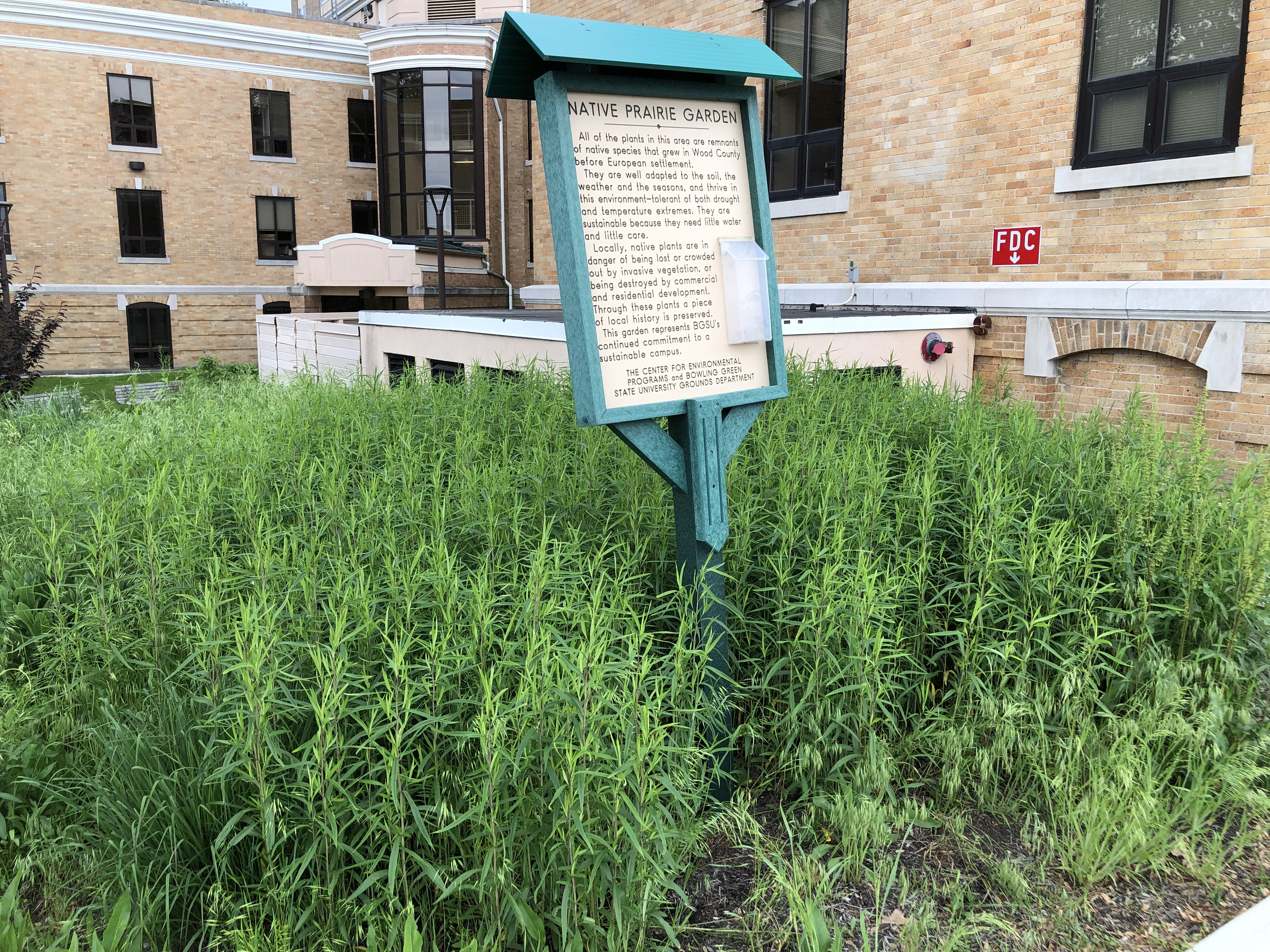
A small prairie garden.

Native gardens include the following kinds:

- Fully forested with leaf debris on the forest floor, including coarse woody debris if possible;
- Desert with arid loving plants and succulents;
- Grassy meadow with a variety of wildflowers and water features;
- Lowland savanna with grasses and native trees; and
- Oceanic dunescape with tall, salt tolerant grasses.

=== Wildflower gardens ===
"Wildflower" in some nations denominates the numerous showy flowers from some drier climates, most notably southwest Western Australia, southern Africa, and North America.

Some wildflower gardens attempt to recreate a prairie, including native grasses along with flowering plants, i. e. forbs. Such gardens benefit the local wildlife, often attracting birds, butterflies, and small mammals. By carefully choosing the plants for the garden, some of these animals can be encouraged to visit the garden. One popular type of wildflower garden specializes in attracting butterflies and is thus denominated a "butterfly garden".

The native plants cultivated in wildflower gardens often have deep roots, and therefore are effective selections for absorbing surface runoff and allowing the water to infiltrate into the local water table. Wildflower gardens cultivated for capturing runoff in this mode are denominated "rain gardens".

=== Rain gardens ===
Rain gardens are often associated with natural landscaping because they use native plants and soil processes to mimic the hydrological function of natural ecosystems. A rain garden is a shallow landscaped depression designed to capture and infiltrate stormwater runoff from impervious surfaces such as roofs, driveways and sidewalks to allow water to soak into the ground rather than entering storm drains. Rain gardens are typically planted with native grasses, shrubs and flowering plants adapted to periodic flooding and drought changes. The vegetation and soils in rain gardens help filter pollutants from runoff while also providing habitat and food for birds, insects and other wildlife. By reducing runoff and supporting biodiversity, rain gardens provide an ecologically beneficial garden to add to natural landscapes.

== Advantages ==
- no fertilization required
- no additional water
- more water available for other uses and other people
- zero to near zero work needed for maintenance
- no lawn mowing
- erosion reduced to a minimum
- natural landscaped plants take full advantage of rainfall
- when water restrictions are implemented, native landscaped plants will survive, while other plants may not
- increased habitat for native flora and fauna
- increased beneficial insect population reduces pests
- where heavily forested, provides shade on homes and businesses saving energy
- native plants rarely become invasive
- more carbon storage

== Disadvantages ==
- not good for outdoor games that require a manicured turf.
- in certain areas, wildfires or brushfires may be of great concern.
- may look less conventionally attractive due to reduced available range of plants to choose from.
- may be hard to find native plants which produce adequate quantities of edible matter.

== Effect of new construction ==
In new construction, builders can either avoid clear cutting or clearing an entire property and disturbing other large flora or builders can completely clear an area of all flora to save construction time and replace the clearing with juvenile specimens once the job is complete. The downside to this is additional costs involved with purchasing replacements. The builder may also choose to plant additional native trees and other flora after construction to help the property blend with natural surroundings.

In some planned developments, natural landscaping is the requirement. Builders may not remove trees larger than a specific diameter and owners may not arbitrarily cut trees without a permit.

== Land reclamation ==
Throughout the world, forested areas are often turned into cattle grazing or farmland. Often this land is then turned into residential or commercial use property. By returning the land back to its original state prior to human disturbance, vast amounts of energy usage and increasing pollution can be reduced. Natural landscaping costs less to install than traditional landscaping and, after the initial few years, reduces maintenance costs, combats erosion, and accommodates storm and flood waters better.

== Native plant societies ==
In many parts of the world there are societies, clubs or local groups, such as Bushcare or Australian Native Plants Society in Australia, the North American Native Plant Society, Pennsylvania Native Plant Society, or the California Native Plant Society, which are made up of gardeners interested in growing plants local to their area, state or country. In the United States, Wild Ones—Native Plants, Natural Landscapes is a national organization with local chapters in many states. The Native Plant Trust and Lady Bird Johnson Wildflower Center also provide information on native plants and promote natural landscaping. These organizations can be the best resources for learning about and obtaining local native plants. Many members have spent years or decades cultivating local plants or bushwalking in local areas.

== See also ==
- Organic lawn management
- Permaculture
- Piet Oudolf
- Reconciliation ecology
- Terroir
- Urban rewilding
- Wildlife gardening
- Xeriscaping
