= Lorrie Otto =

American writer

Lorrie Otto (September 9, 1919 – May 29, 2010) was an American speaker and author. As an environmentalist, she was an ardent supporter of the protection of biological diversity. She helped to bring about the DDT ban in the United States and helped to establish the Environmental Defense Fund.

== Background ==
She was born Mary Lorraine Stoeber in 1919 near Madison, Wisconsin. She was a farmer's daughter and was intrigued as a young child by the freshly turned soil on her father's land. She joined the Women Airforce Service Pilots during World War II.

== Education and marriage ==
She graduated from the University of Wisconsin. She met her future husband there, Owen Otto, a psychiatrist.

== Activism ==
In the 1960s, while concerned about the number of dead birds around her property in Milwaukee, she brought hearings on the pesticide use in Wisconsin. She organized scientists, attorneys and witnesses from the US, Canada and Sweden to present evidence against DDT. She was able to bring about a ban, the first in Wisconsin in 1970, against DDT. This led to a nationwide ban two years later.

In 1979, after hearing Otto lecture, Ginny Lindow and eight other women began to meet monthly to discuss natural landscaping. They wanted to promote the use of native plants to landscape city and suburban yards. They called themselves the "Wild Ones" and today their organization has chapters throughout the United States.

Her naturally landscaped garden was featured in Martha Stewart Living and was also included in the book "The American Woman's Garden," which was primarily about large estate gardens.

== Recognitions ==
She was inducted into the Wisconsin Conservation Hall of Fame in 1999. The Schlitz Audubon Center's annual natural yards tour now bears her name. She received recognition from the National Audubon Society, the National Wildlife Federation and praise from former Vice President Al Gore.

== What others said about her ==
"More than anyone else, Lorrie Otto brought the whole idea of natural landscaping to the public's view," says naturalist Craig Tufts, manager of NWF's Backyard Wildlife Habitat Program.

Charles Wurster, a founding trustee of Environmental Defense Fund, summed up Otto's environmental career this way: "The lawn police would come around and get after her. Eventually she became a national figure on behalf of all sorts of conservation causes."

== Family life ==
Otto was married for many years and then divorced. She had two children. A son who died, and a daughter, Patricia Otto of Bellingham.

== Death ==
Otto lived with her daughter in later years in Bellingham, Washington. She died on May 29, 2010, at the age of 90 after a brief illness. She was buried at the Greenacres Memorial Park's The Meadow, a "green" cemetery in Ferndale where only biodegradable materials are used and embalming is not allowed.

== Additional resources ==
- http://www.jsonline.com/news/opinion/95563839.html
- http://www.calebwilde.com/2014/07/the-green-burial-of-lorrie-otto/
