= Verna Pratt =

American botanist, gardening expert, author

Verna E. Pratt
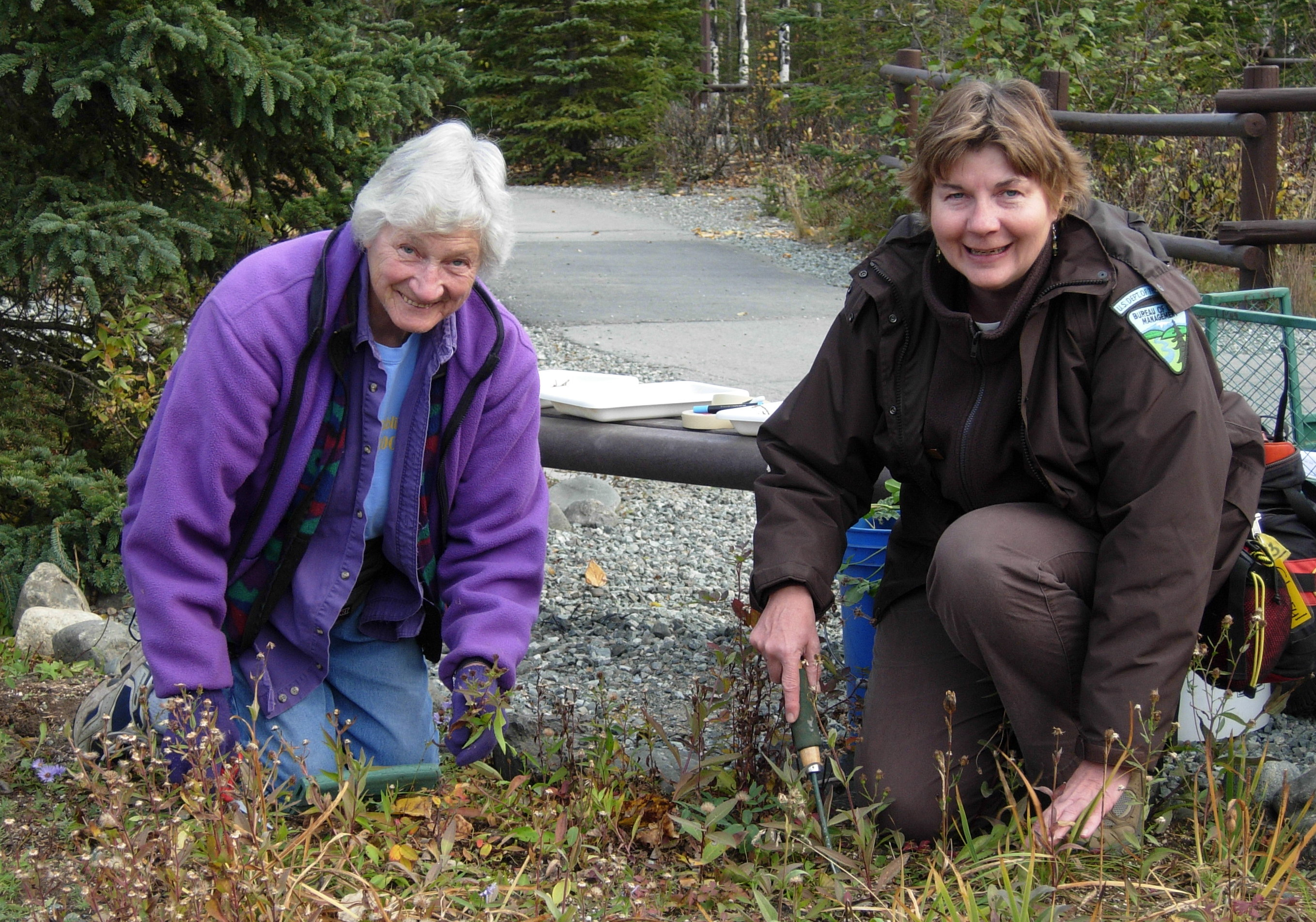
- Verna Pratt, left, in September 2010. She is alongside an employee of the Bureau of Land Management at the Campbell Creek Science Center in Anchorage, where she received a lifetime achievement award for her work.
- Born: Verna Evelyn Goldthwaite; September 30, 1930; West Newbury, Massachusetts
- Died: January 8, 2017 (aged 86); Anchorage, Alaska
- Known for: Author, expert on Alaska botany
- Notable work: Field Guide to Alaskan Wildflowers Commonly Seen Along Highways and Byways, Wildflowers Along the Alaska Highway, Wildflowers of Denali National Park, Alaska's Wild Berries and Berry-Like Fruit, Linnaea's World
- Spouse: Frank Pratt (m. 1950; died 2012)

Verna E. Pratt (September 30, 1930 - January 8, 2017) was an American botanist, gardening expert, and author. She was considered an expert on Alaska native plants and wildflowers and produced several field guides on the topic. Pratt is also credited for popularizing the knowledge of Alaska plants among gardeners and recreationalists.

== Early life ==
Verna Pratt was born Verna Evelyn Goldthwaite on September 30, 1930, on a small family farm in West Newbury, Massachusetts, where she was the sixth of eight children. Her fascination with plants and flowers began in her childhood, where she would often find herself compelled by the fields of wildflowers that surrounded the farm. In 1950, at the age of 20, she married Frank Pratt.

== Moving to Alaska ==
Frank Pratt, Verna's husband, was a boy she met in high school and married five years later. With Frank serving in the Army, the family moved to Detroit and New Orleans before heading to Alaska in 1966, where he was stationed at Fort Richardson in Anchorage, Alaska. In each city they resided, Verna sought out plants, and by the time she moved to Alaska with Frank and their two children, Verna had become fascinated with the wildflowers and plants of the state. With a lack of accessible information, Verna Pratt became committed to studying and documenting the plants, wild berries, and wild flowers native to Alaska.

== Professional career ==
As Verna Pratt delved into her exploration of Alaska's plants and wildflowers, she realized there was a lack of information present. As a mission, Verna Pratt dedicated her time to documenting Alaska's plants and wildflowers with her husband, who took photographs of both. The couple traveled throughout the state of Alaska from the Kenai Peninsula, along the Seward Highway, the Richardson Highway, the Glenn Highway, to Dutch Harbor, and Southeast Alaska, as well as Southcentral Alaska, and Interior Alaska. In doing so, they produced their first book together: Field Guide to Alaskan Wildflowers Commonly Seen Along Highways and Byways, which was published in 1989 and has sold over 100,000 copies.

In 1991, Pratt published Wildflowers Along the Alaska Highway, followed by Wildflowers of Denali National Park in 1992. In 1995, Pratt published a pocket guide on Alaskan wild berries titled Alaska’s Wild Berries and Berry-like Fruit. Upon realizing that there was no children's literature about Alaska's wild berries, wildflowers, and plants, Pratt wrote and published Linnaea’s World in 1996.

For her literary contributions, Verna Pratt received the Helen S. Hull Literary Award from the National Council of State Garden Clubs in both 1991 and 1993.

=== Field Guide to Alaska Wildflowers (1989) ===
Pratt wrote Field Guide to Alaska Wildflowers due to information on flowers being too scientific and advanced for a household gardener. The book was written and arranged by color, keeping in mind the everyday botanist. From her personal experience learning about the wildflowers of Alaska including her being a teacher on the subject of wildflower identification, Pratt realized that color is the first characteristic people notice when observing plants. However, Pratt noted that color is not the most important characteristic of plants, other plant features and aspects are important to the identification and must be taken into account. Each plant in the book was identified based on color, family, habitat, blooming time, and general description. The field guide also goes into more obscure plant characteristics like toxicity, edibility, and economic uses. As a note, the blooming time of plants might be two weeks ahead or behind due to changes in Alaska's climate. These climates could include snowfall, the length of the winter season, and the timing of snow melt-off. What makes Alaska so special in terms of its plants and flowers is how large the state is, covering 586,400 square miles. Elevations in the state reach up to 20,320 feet in height. These two combinations cause very diverse growing conditions and seasons.

Pratt admitted it is not a complete guide to all the plants in Alaska since there are over 1500 species in the state. The book mainly focuses on plants near major highways, pull-offs, and campsites. Many species don't have pictures, but the more complex plants with different variations are described when necessary, this includes flowers with a rare amount of petals. Pratt hoped that the book encourages people to look at plants and flowers in finer detail, and most importantly, be useful to people just getting into the plant world.

== Flowers/Plants Studied by Pratt ==
=== Twin Flower (Linnaea Borealis) ===
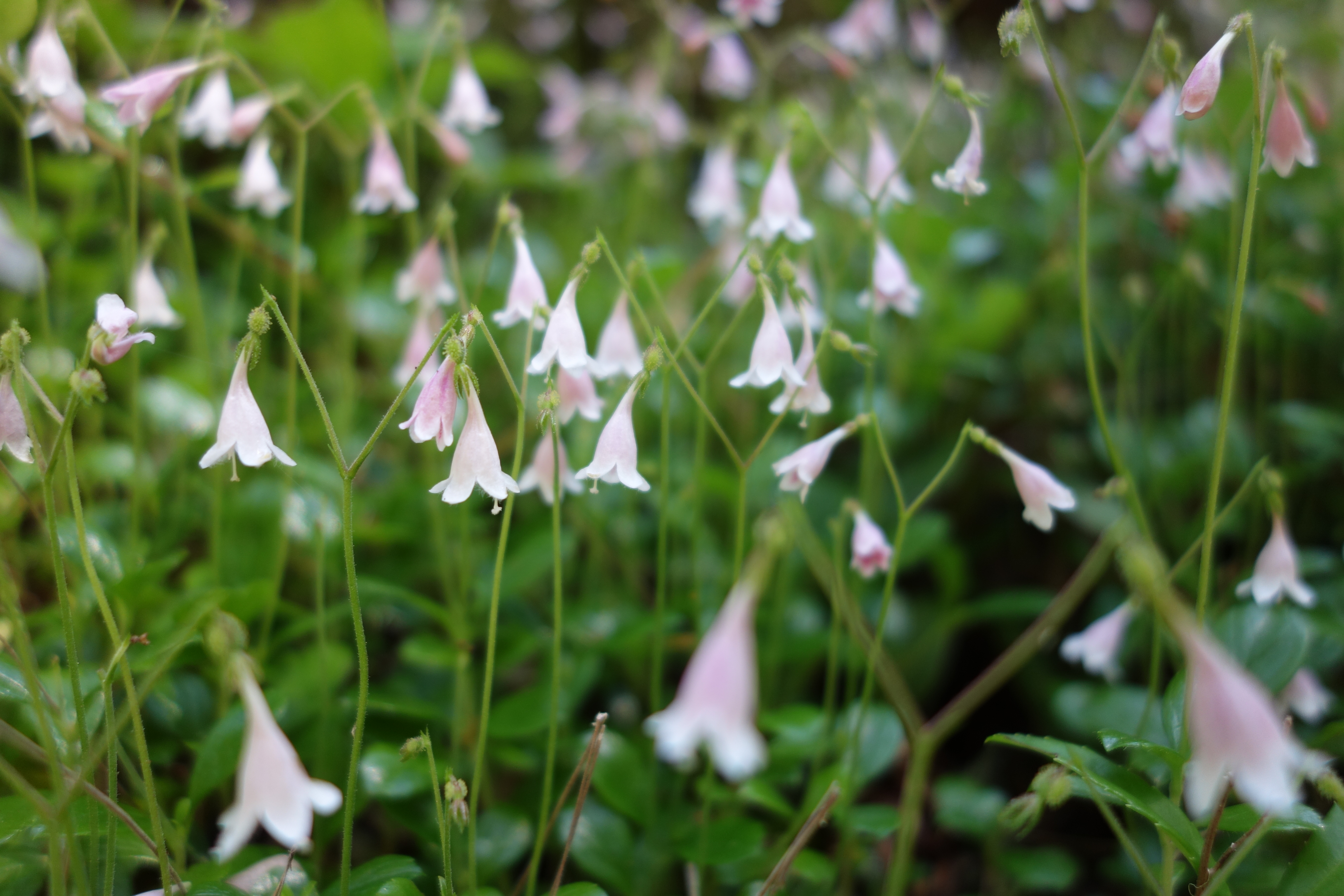
A photo of the Twin Flower

The Twin Flower (or the specific epithet, Linnaea Borealis meaning "northern") is part of the honeysuckle family. The plant was named by Swedish botanist Carl Linnaeus in 1753. He was responsible for putting names to over 8000 plants, often naming aesthetically pleasing plants after his supporters and unattractive plants after his detractors. Linnaea Borealis was Linnaeus's favorite plant and named it after his close friend and teacher. This flower is seen in woods and other dry areas including on mountains, they bloom Mid-June to early August. The flower features a long shrub with evergreen leaves that are rounded and light green, these leaves are placed opposite of the stems. The flowering stems have 1-2 sets of leaves that include pink/white bell-shaped flowers that are carried on 3-6 Y-shaped stalks. The pink to white flowers grow in pairs which is why the common name is "Twin Flower." The flowers have a strong smell that lasts about 7 days after blooming. The Twin Flower isn't just seen in Alaska, it can also be found in northern Europe, Asia and parts of North America, however, the plant is slowly becoming endangered as its occurrence in these areas have dropped 50% since 1970.

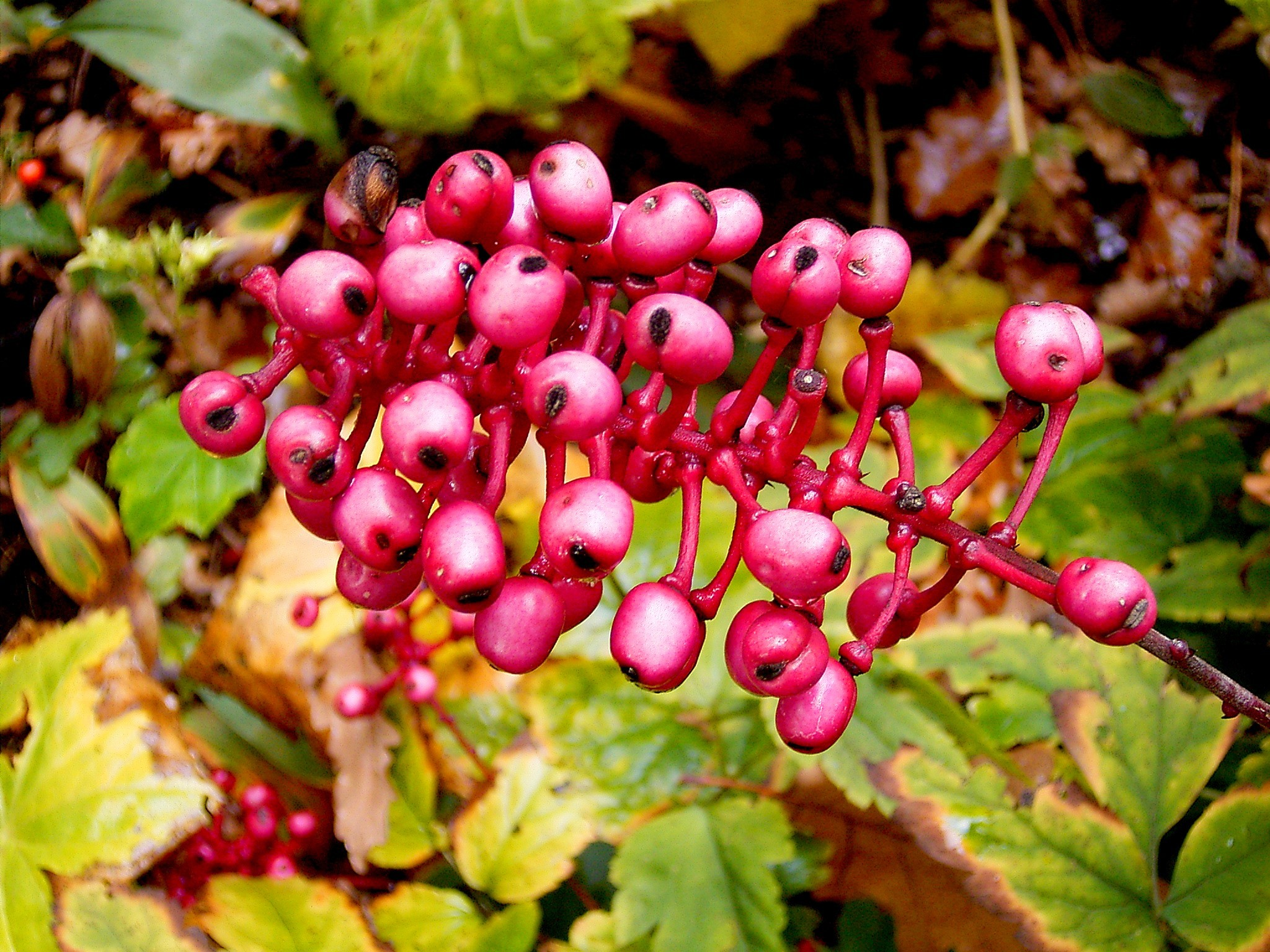
A photo of the Actaea Rubra (Baneberry)

=== Baneberry/Snakeberry (Actaea Rubra) ===
The Baneberry or Snakeberry (or the specific epithet Actaea Rubra) is part of the crowfoot/ranunculaceae family. The first form of the plant Baneberry has red berries while the other form Snakeberry has white berries. This plant can be found in cool, moist forests in North America, specifically in Alaska and the Yukon, but it also occurs in aboriginal areas in the North. The long-lasting plant in 18-30 inches long with 3-5 toothed leaves that grows from the flower stalk. The red or white berries are high above the leaves and they ripen a few weeks after they bloom, around mid-July through August. However, the berries are very poisonous, the digestion of six berries can kill a child. In Alaska, you can find these plants along mountainsides or pull-offs along highways.

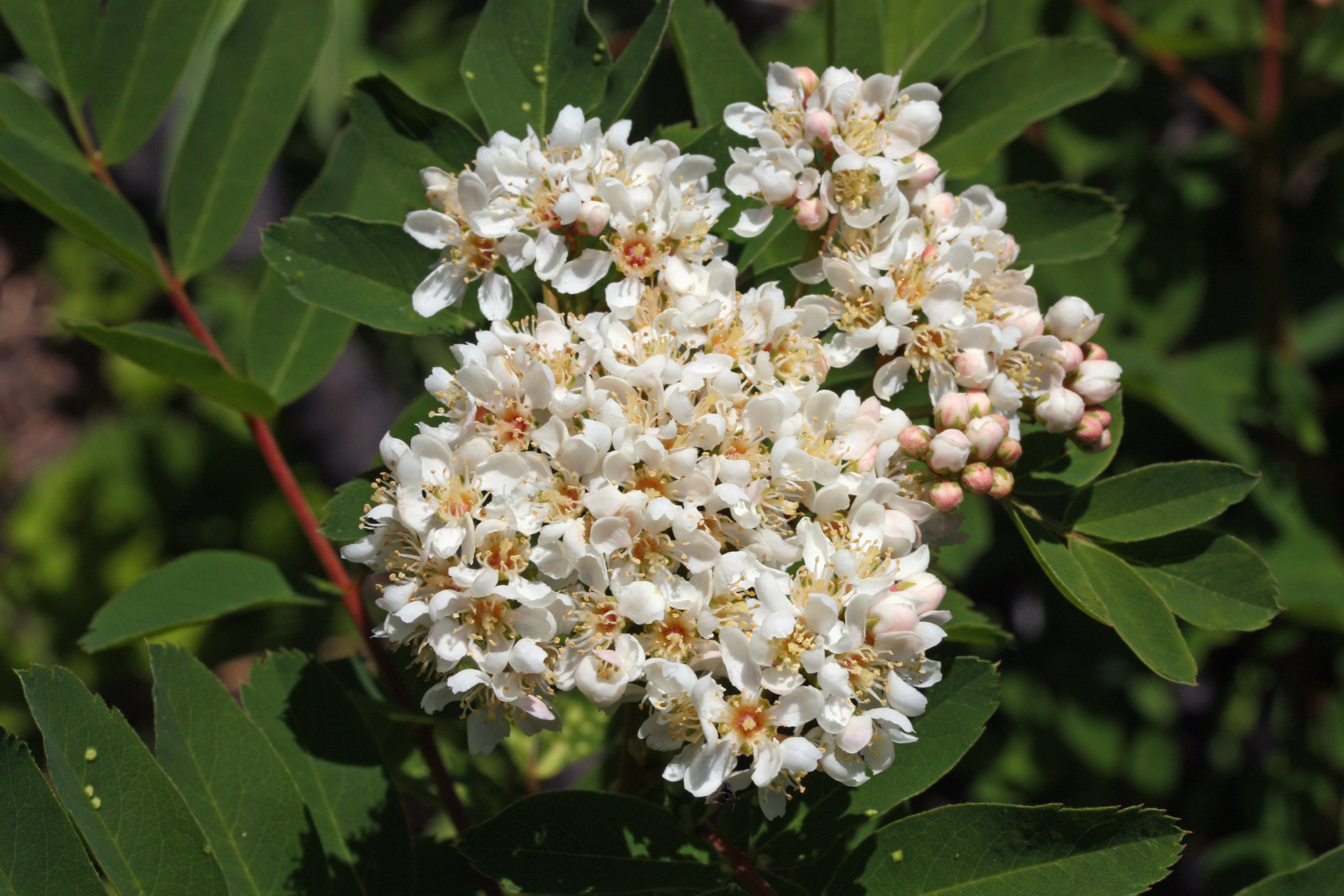
A photo of Sorbus Sitchensis

=== Mountain Ash (Sorbus Sitchensis) ===
The Mountain Ash (or the specific epithet Sorbus Sitchensis) is part of the Rose/Rosaceae family. This is a native plant that reaches up 4–9 feet tall, there is also a rare small tree variant that is up to 20 feet tall. The plant grows in the woods, low alpine meadows, and slopes on high elevation mountains over at the southeast and coastal Southcenter of Alaska. The twigs have small brown-colored hairs, the leaves are divided into small 7-11 notched leaflets, the flowers have 5 petals and are round with flat clusters at the end of the branches. The flowers can grow large, red/orange berries that bloom in the fall, the berries are safe to eat but are bitter until they've been frozen and thawed a few times.

The flower propagates with seeds. After the plant reaches 15 years of age, it starts producing a seed crop every year. The seeds are transported by birds like the bohemian waxwing who also eat the berries. The seeds themselves are firm but regularly damaged by deer.

== Other achievements ==
In 1982, Verna Pratt co-founded the Alaska Native Plant Society with her husband, Frank. She served as president of the society from 1982 to 1988. Pratt then founded the Alaska Chapter of the North American Rock Garden Society in 1997. In 1999, she received the Meritorious Service Award for producing informational sources that promoted learning. The following year, Verna Pratt was honored by the Anchorage YWCA as a Woman of Achievement. In 2002, she was elected to the national board of directors for the North American Rock Garden Society. In 2009, along with her husband, Verna Pratt was the first person awarded a Lifetime Achievement Award from the Anchorage Chapter of Alaska Master Gardeners Association. Verna Pratt was also an avid educator. She taught classes and led hiking tours at the University of Alaska Anchorage, Denali National Park, the Alaska Botanical Garden, and the Anchorage School District. Pratt was the keynote speaker at the International Rock Garden Plant Conference in Scotland in 2001.

== See also ==
- Verna Pratt flowers
