= Alaska Native Plant Society =

Plant conservation organization

Alaska Native Plant Society (AKNPS)
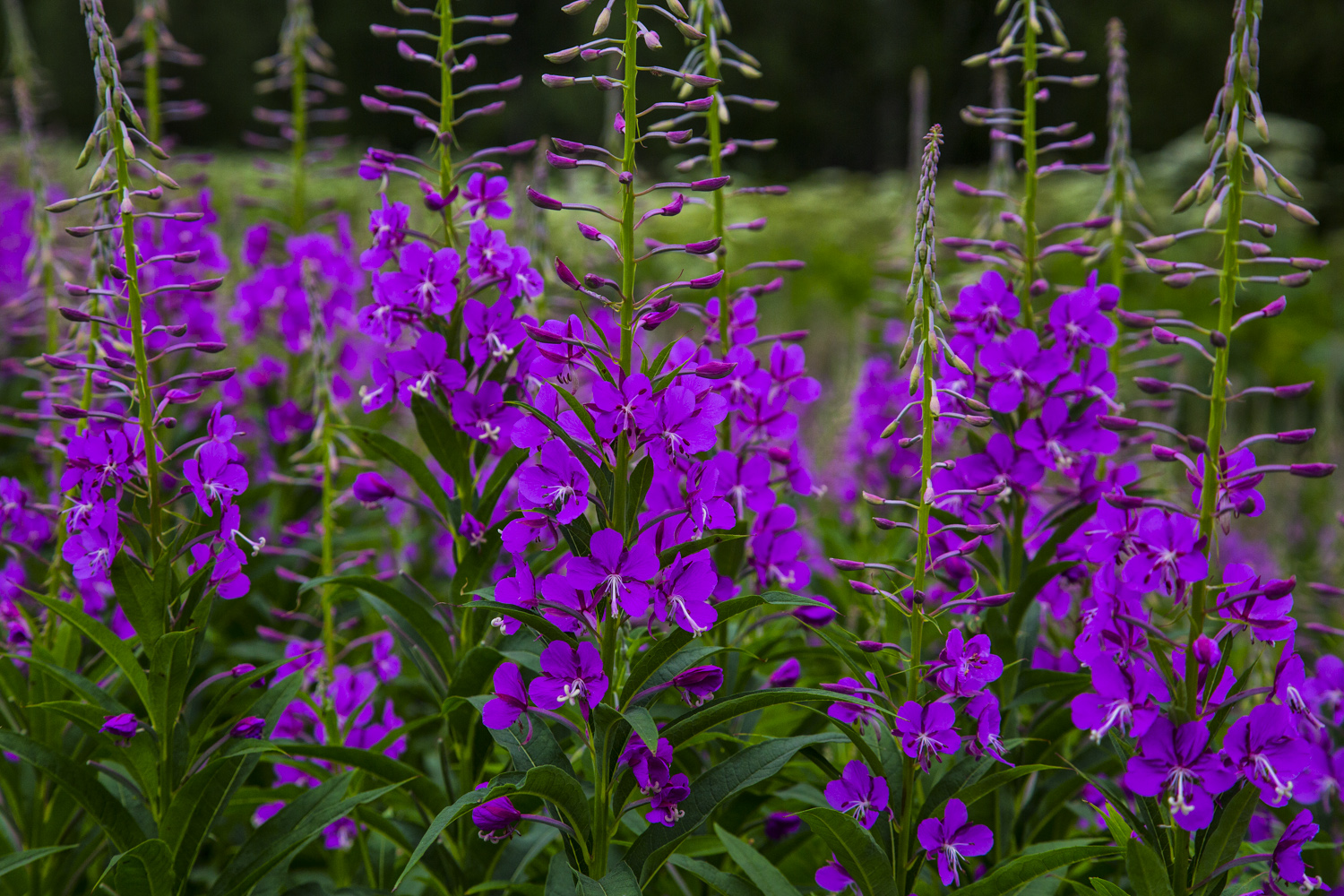
- Fireweed in Alaska. Native plants on BLM land
- Founded: 1982; 44 years ago
- Founder: Verna Pratt
- Type: Non-profit organization
- Purpose: Preservation and education
- Region served: Alaska
- Website: aknps.org

The Alaska Native Plant Society (AKNPS) is a non-profit organization focused on studying and conserving Alaska's native plant species. The organization was started in 1982 by Verna Pratt and a group of amateur botanists with the goal to study, conserve, and educate. Their mission is to conserve and study Alaskan native plants in their natural habitats, and to educate in order to increase understanding and appreciation of native plants.

== Activities ==
The AKNPS is dedicated to the study, conservation, and cultivation of Alaska's native plant species. Their main drive is to educate while conserving Alaska's native flora. With that end in mind, AKNPS currently:

- Holds a meeting on the first Monday of each month, October through May.
- Meetings are open to the public and include invited guests presenting on a topic of their choice, members presenting on a topic of botanical interest, as well as members presenting their own research on a specific native plant of the month.
- Hosts half-day and multi-day field trips and excursions throughout Alaska to study local flora.
- Hosts displays at local sites during “Celebrating Wildflowers” periods.
- Publishes Borealis, a bi-monthly newsletter for its members.
- Hosts a comprehensive compilation of Alaskan flora references in an online bibliography.
- Hosts workshops for people to learn more about local flora.

== History ==
A group of 35 native plant enthusiasts came together in 1982 to start the AKNPS. Among them, was Verna Pratt who co-founded the organization with her husband Frank and worked as president from 1982 to 1988. The group set out to form an organization centered around educating, studying, and conserving Alaska's native plant species in order to foster enthusiasm and understanding of Alaska's flora. The Alaska Native Plant Society predates the North American Native Plant Society that got started in 1985.

=== Founding President: Verna Pratt ===
Verna Pratt and 34 other native plant enthusiasts started the Alaska Native Plant Society in 1982. Verna was the lead in its start up and worked as its president from 1982 to 1988. She cultivated knowledge of Alaska's native flora as others cultivated plants. Verna was born in Massachusetts in 1930 and died in Anchorage, Alaska in 2017 at the age of 86. Verna moved to Alaska in 1966 with her husband Frank Pratt, where the two of them made a huge impact beginning with their start up of the AKNPS. In 2009, Verna and Frank Pratt were the first people to receive a lifetime achievement award from the Anchorage chapter of the Alaska Master Gardeners. Verna Pratt was inducted into the Alaska Women's Hall of Fame in 2014.

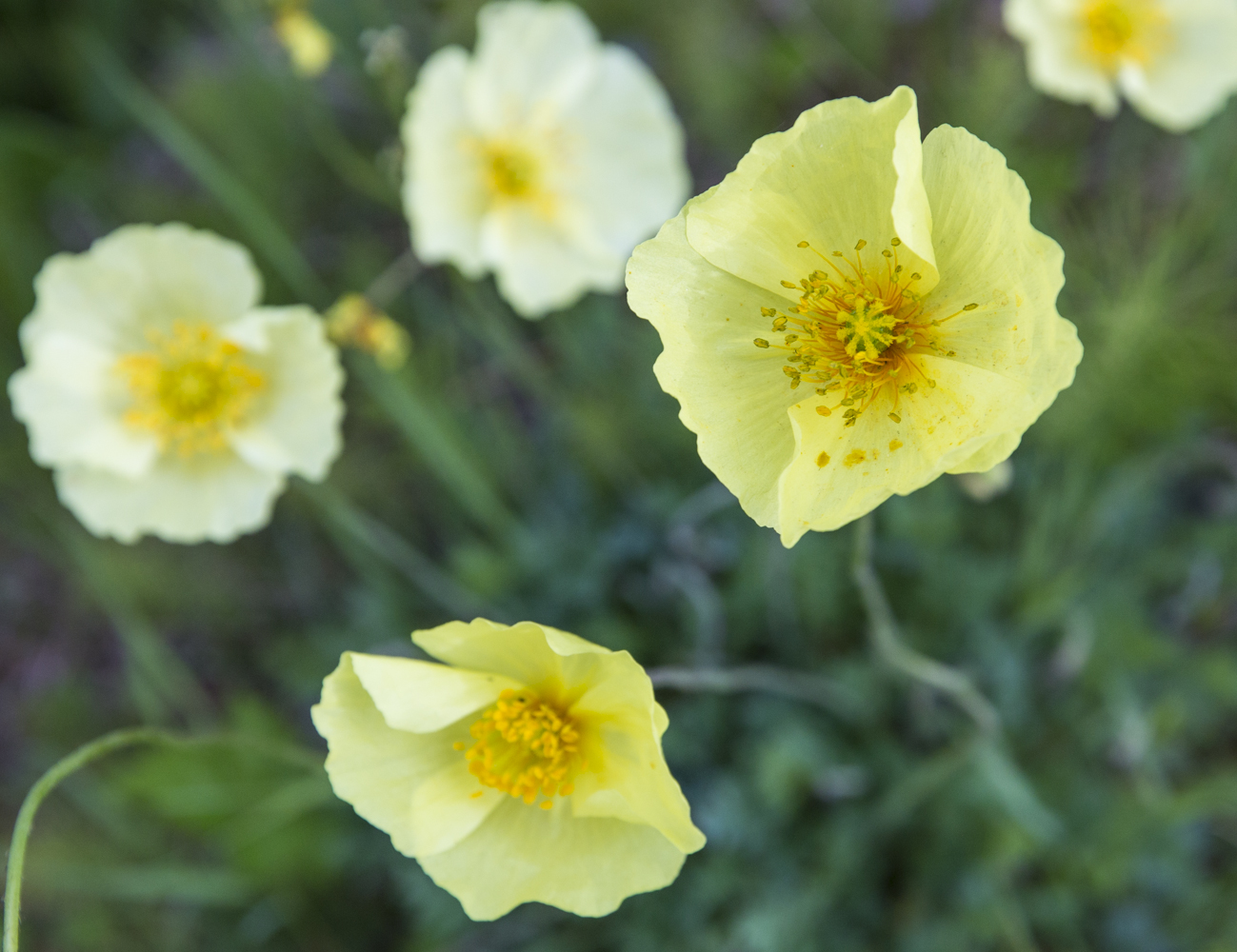
Macoun's Poppy in Alaska

Verna and Frank Pratt published several books together focusing on native plant life in Alaska. What set her books apart from the ones available at the time were the in-color photos and the organization method used. Instead of being organized alphabetically, which favored seasoned plant experts, these books were organized by plant color: for the average person. Verna's first publication, Field Guide to Alaskan Wildflowers Commonly Seen Along Highways and Byways, was published in 1989. The book sold 25,000 copies in the first two years of printing. Verna went on to write several more books: Wildflowers Along the Alaska Highway, Wildflowers of Denali National Park, Alaska's Wild berries and Berry-Like Fruit, and the lesser known children's book Linnaea's World.

== Linnaea borealis ==
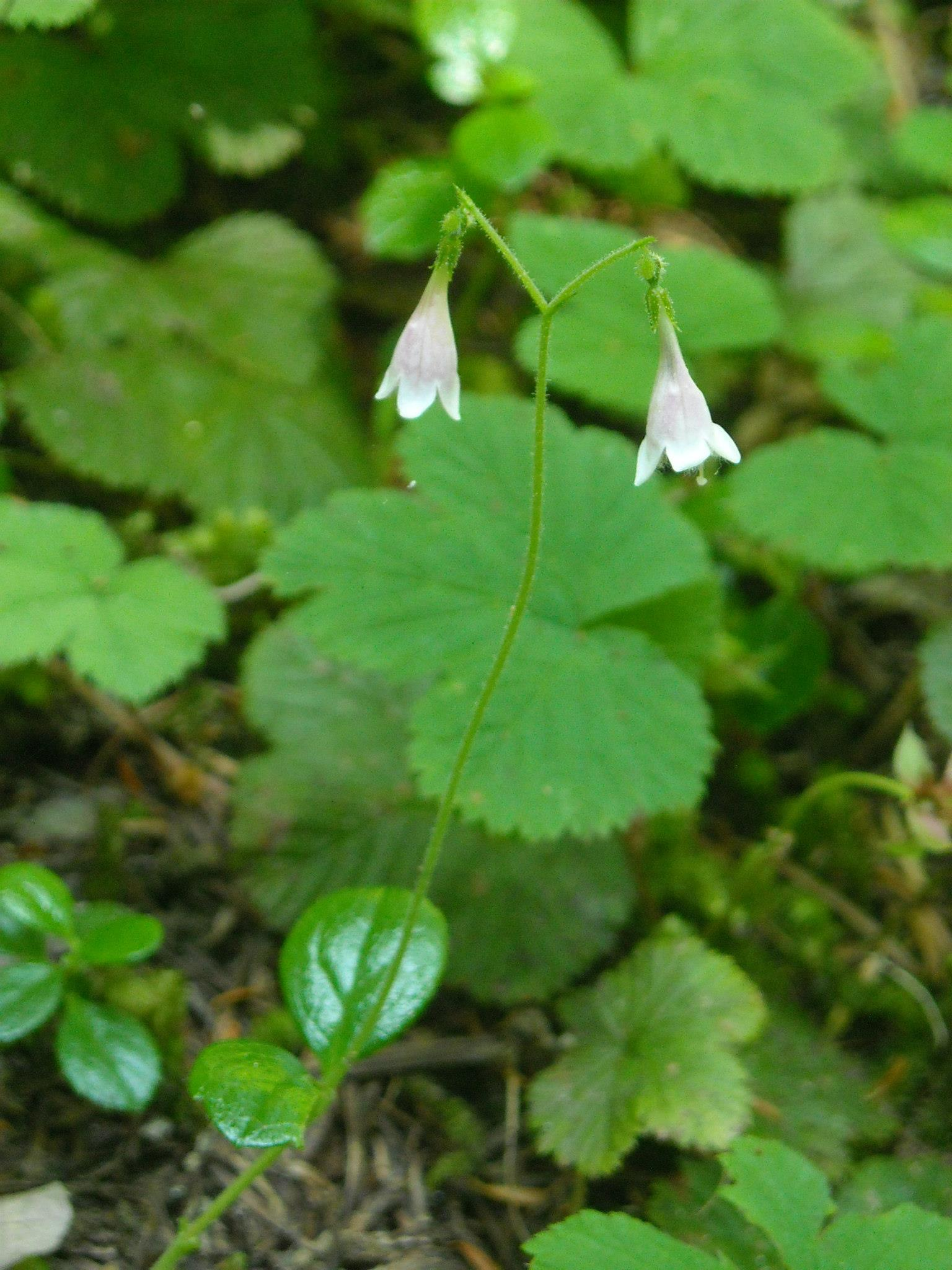
Twinflower (Linnaea borealis)

Linnaea borealis, also known a Twinflower, is the flower chosen by the first members of the AKNPS to represent them on their logo and emblem.

Twinflower is found throughout the Northern hemisphere in boreal climates. This flower prefers forests, shrublands, and open dry slopes. The term borealis means “northern.” The name twinflower comes from its bell shaped flowers. Pink to white bell shaped flower grow in pairs on Y-shaped stalks. These flowers are very fragrant. The blooms last only about seven days.
