= Bushcare Group =

Australian volunteer group

A Bushcare Group is a volunteer group that conducts bush regeneration to aid biodiversity conservation on public or private bushland in Australia.

Bushcare groups have arisen due to rising community support for conservation and this has driven the allocation of native vegetation remnants to conservation through ecological restoration.

There are numerous Bushcare Groups in Australia working as volunteers to restore remnant patches of native bushland on public lands. For example, in the Blue Mountains just outside Sydney, there are now 50 such Bush Regeneration Groups working to restore bushland. Most suburban councils are involved in bushcare to varying degrees, either by employing professional staff or facilitating volunteer involvement. Around Australia Natural Resource Management Boards and Non Government Organisations offer training and equipment to community volunteers.
