= Washington Native Plant Society =

- Abbreviation: WNPS
- Formation: 1976
- Website: www.wnps.org

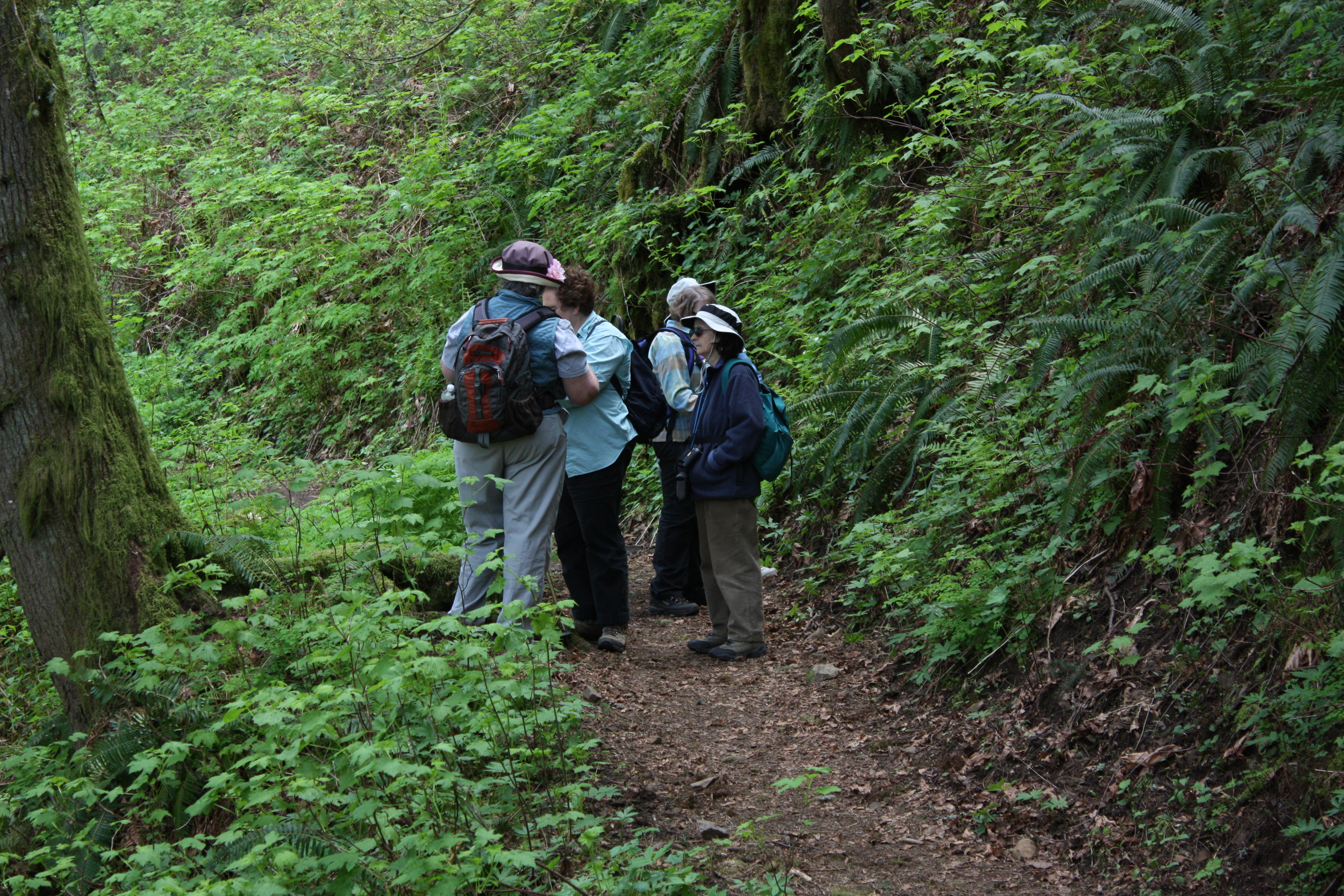
Washington Native Plant Society field trip in John B. Yeon State Park

The Washington Native Plant Society (WNPS) is a non-profit organization dedicated to the protection and appreciation of the native plants of the U.S. state of Washington. The society advocates for the protection of species, their habitats, and general environmental quality. WNPS also works in cooperation with other non-profit groups, such as the Seattle Audubon Society on public education and advocacy efforts.

The founding president was Arthur Kruckeberg, author and Professor Emeritus of Botany at the University of Washington.

The society has funded and published scholarly papers, called the Douglasia Occasional Papers.
