= Mercer Island station =

Light rail station in Mercer Island, Washington

55 Mercer Island
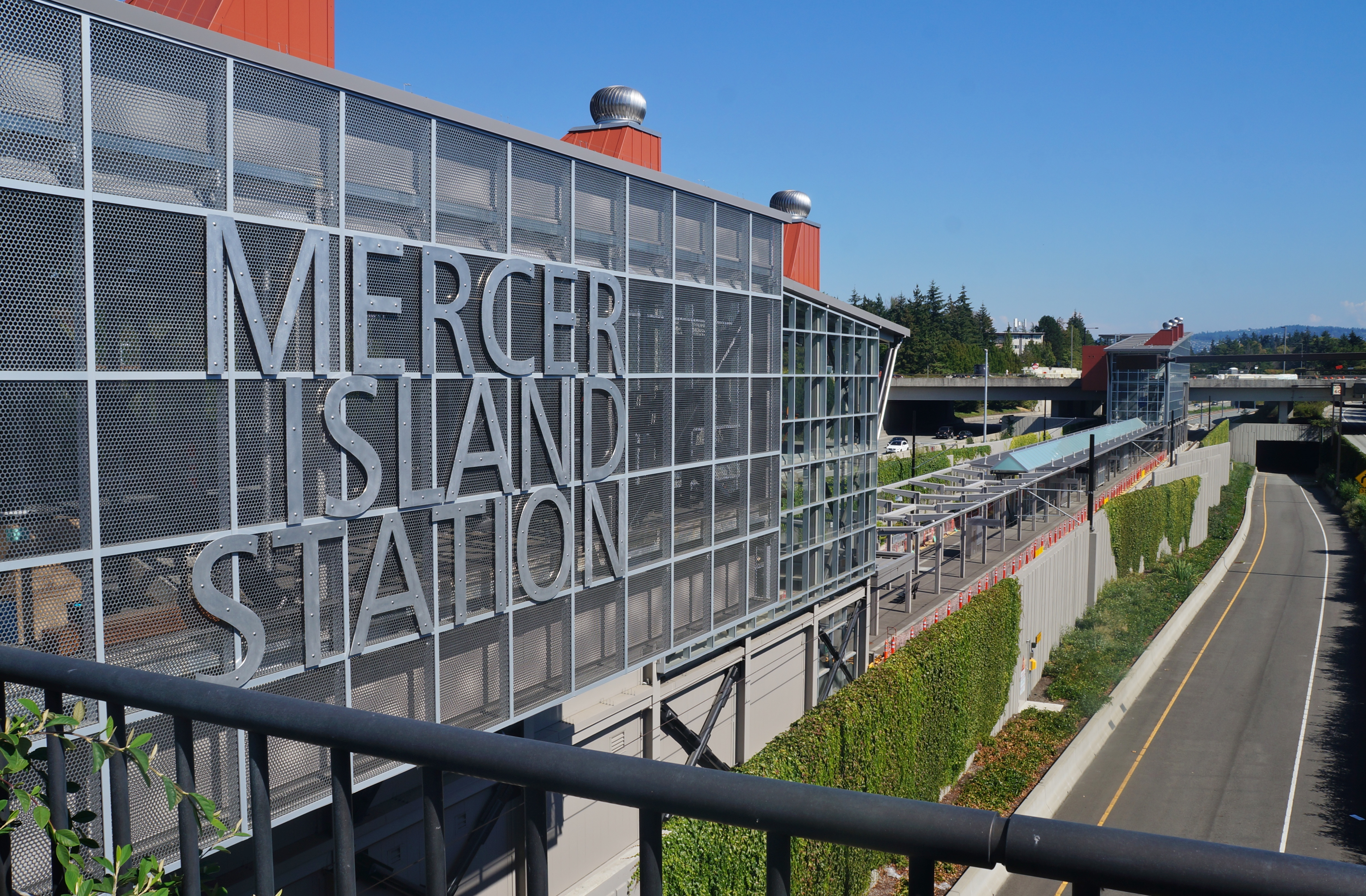
- West entrance under construction in August 2022

General information
- Location: 2510 77th Avenue Southeast; Mercer Island, Washington; United States
- Coordinates: 47°35′17″N 122°13′58″W
- System: Link light rail
- Owner: Sound Transit
- Platforms: 1 island platform
- Tracks: 2
- Connections: King County Metro, Sound Transit Express

Construction
- Structure type: Below-grade
- Parking: 447 stalls
- Cycle facilities: 20 stalls (bicycle room), 24 lockers, and racks
- Accessible: Yes

History
- Opened: March 28, 2026

Services
| Preceding station | Sound Transit | Following station |
Link
| Judkins Park toward Lynnwood City Center | 2 Line | South Bellevue toward Downtown Redmond |
Location

Mercer Island station is a light rail station that serves the city of Mercer Island, Washington, United States. It is on the 2 Line, part of the Link light rail system managed by Sound Transit. The station is located in the median of Interstate 90 and is adjacent to a park-and-ride garage with 447 stalls. It opened on March 28, 2026, as part of the 2 Line section that crosses Lake Washington between Seattle and the Eastside.

The original transit facility at the site was a park-and-ride lot that opened in 1989 for use by Metro Transit (now King County Metro) buses. Sound Transit rebuilt the lot into a two-story garage that opened in 2008. Mercer Island station was built near the garage and is also served by King County Metro and Sound Transit Express bus routes that connect to other cities.

== Location ==
The station is located in the median of Interstate 90 between 77th and 80th avenues in northern Mercer Island near the city's business district. The district, officially named the "town center", was created in the 1990s and encompasses 76.5 acres (31.0 ha). As of 2024, it has 1,391 total housing units—primarily in multi-family and mixed-use buildings—and 2,327 jobs at employers in the neighborhood. The town center has a height limit of five stories, or 63 feet (19 m), which was contested by local residents in the 2010s. The Mercer Island city government completed several pedestrian projects to improve access to the station from the town center, including new curb ramps, street lighting, and a 35-stall parking lot. The Mountains to Sound Greenway, a multi-use bicycle and pedestrian trail, runs north of the station and continues along the Interstate 90 corridor.

== History ==
=== Park and ride ===
Metro Transit (now King County Metro) was launched on January 1, 1973, and immediately began operating local and express bus service on Mercer Island. By the end of the year, eight express routes traveled on Interstate 90 across the island towards Seattle on the Lake Washington Floating Bridge. Planning for a second floating bridge was underway with a busway or future rail component proposed by local officials and approved for study by the state government in 1975. That same year, Metro Transit opened a temporary park-and-ride lot in northern Mercer Island to accommodate new bus and carpool users during construction work on the floating bridge. The agency had already listed Mercer Island as the site of a permanent park-and-ride in their 1973 plan with the goal of opening the facility by the end of the decade.

The Washington State Department of Transportation (WSDOT) allocated a portion of its $21 million park-and-ride budget to build a lot near Interstate 90 in northern Mercer Island. The agency acquired a lot adjacent to the future freeway right of way in 1987 from a private landowner. Metro Transit opened its North Mercer Way park-and-ride in July 1989 with capacity for 235 vehicles. An expansion of the lot was funded by Sound Transit in 1996 to serve its new express route network, which included routes from Mercer Island to Downtown Seattle, Bellevue, and Issaquah. A parking garage at the existing lot's site was chosen in 2003 after evaluating several options and the collapse of a public–private development plan.

The original park-and-ride lot closed in February 2006 for the expansion project; several temporary lots were designated on Mercer Island with a shuttle bus network to connect with regional express buses. A two-story parking garage with 450 stalls was chosen by the city council instead of a larger configuration to deter its use by commuters from outside Mercer Island. The garage was scheduled to open in March 2007, but was delayed by 10 months due to several design flaws that were discovered when a support beam cracked during construction. The garage opened on January 17, 2008, and cost $16.8 million to construct.

=== Rail planning and construction ===
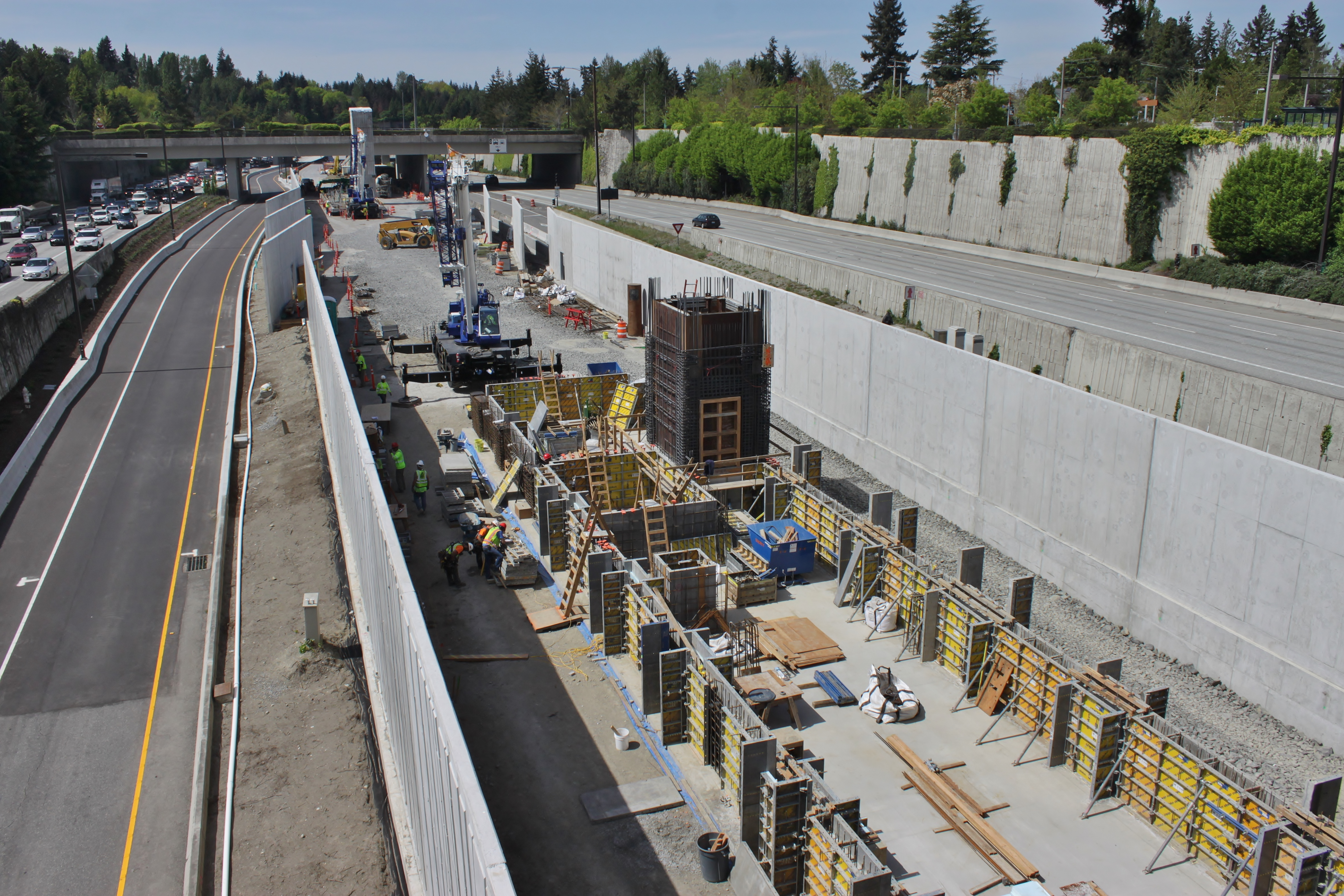
Platform construction in May 2018

A regional rapid transit plan for Seattle and the Eastside, proposed as part of the Forward Thrust ballot measures, was rejected by King County voters in 1968 and 1970. It included a line from Seattle to Bellevue on the Interstate 90 corridor using a new floating bridge, with a station on Mercer Island within the freeway's right of way. The proposed station would have had tunnels to reach two entrances that served a park-and-ride lot to the north and the island's business district to the south. Although the rapid transit plan was rejected, planning for the next floating bridge between Seattle and Mercer Island went forward under the state government. Through negotiations with the local and county governments, a memorandum was signed in 1976 to include reversible express lanes on the bridge that would be converted to transit use in the future.

A regional transit authority, later named Sound Transit, was established in 1993 to design a new transit plan that would focus on light rail, including on the Seattle–Eastside corridor. A large regional plan, which included a line between Seattle and Overlake with a stop on Mercer Island, was rejected by voters in March 1995. The Eastside line was left out of the subsequent Sound Move package that funded the first sections of the Link light rail system in 1996, but the corridor was included in long-range expansion plans. The light rail project, named the East Link Extension, was in the unsuccessful 2007 Roads and Transit ballot measure but approved in the following year's Sound Transit 2 package. Mercer Island was adopted as the station's official name in 2015; other options included Roanoke Crossing, Mercer Village, Mercer View, and Luther Burbank.

Construction of the station on Mercer Island began in late 2017. After the discovery of 5,400 defective concrete plinths under the installed rails on the Seattle and Mercer Island sections in 2022, Sound Transit announced that the opening of East Link (renamed the 2 Line) would be delayed from 2023 to 2026. An unaffected section, between South Bellevue and Redmond Technology stations, began passenger service in April 2024 while replacement work continued on Mercer Island. Mercer Island station opened on March 28, 2026, along with Judkins Park station as part of the "Crosslake Connection" section of the 2 Line. A community festival organized by the Mercer Island chamber of commerce at the park-and-ride garage included booths, vendors, food trucks, and stage performances.

== Station layout ==
The station comprises a single island platform in the median of Interstate 90 that is aligned northwest–southeast. The platform is 380 feet (120 m) long and has a listed capacity of 500 people. Mercer Island station has two entrances to streets that cross over Interstate 90: 77th Avenue Southeast to the west (exit A) and 80th Avenue Southeast to the east (exit B). Both entrances include a lobby with ticket vending machines and connections to the platform via a set of stairs, escalators, and elevators that ascend by 27 feet (8.2 m). The entrances have glass facades and are partially cantilevered over the tracks to reduce the footprint of the station. A two-story parking garage near the east entrance (exit B) serves as a park-and-ride facility with 447 stalls, of which 10 are designated for vehicles with disabled parking permits. The station also has a secured bicycle room with 20 stalls, 24 individual bicycle lockers, and other racks around the entrances.

Hewitt Architects designed the light rail station, which sits in the former express lanes of Interstate 90. Two pieces of public art designed by Beliz Brother were commissioned for Mercer Island station as part of Sound Transit's percent for art program. Stroke, suspended above the west entrance, encompasses paddles and oars from various types of boats and watercraft; Crossing at the east entrance comprises a simplified boat on a wave that is suspended above the staircase. Both pieces reflect the previous means of crossing Lake Washington, primarily by boat, before the construction of the first floating bridge. Stroke and Crossing were installed at the station in July 2022. A stainless steel sculpture, Ghost Ship Migrations by Julie Berger, was installed at the park-and-ride in 2008.

== Services ==
Mercer Island station is served by the 2 Line, a Link light rail line that connects Seattle and Snohomish County to the Eastside region by crossing Lake Washington. It is situated between Judkins Park station to the west and South Bellevue station to the east. Trains on the 2 Line serve the station 20 hours a day on weekdays and Saturdays, from approximately 4:30 a.m. to 12:30 a.m.; and over 18 hours on Sundays, from approximately 5:30 a.m. to 12:00 a.m. During regular weekday service, trains operate roughly every eight to ten minutes during rush hour and midday operation, respectively, with longer headways of twelve to fifteen minutes in the early morning and at night. Mercer Island station is approximately 15 minutes from Westlake station in Downtown Seattle and 12 minutes from Bellevue Downtown station.

The station is also served by local and regional buses that use two bays on North Mercer Way near the east entrance and park-and-ride garage. King County Metro operates local routes on the island along with express routes on Interstate 90 to Issaquah, Sammamish, Snoqualmie, and North Bend. A night bus, Sound Transit Express route 547, stops at the station and serves most of the 2 Line stations between Seattle and Redmond during hours without light rail trains. Until 2026, Mercer Island station was served by two Sound Transit Express routes that provided all-day service to Downtown Seattle, Bellevue, and Issaquah.
