= Esterra Park =

Transit-oriented development

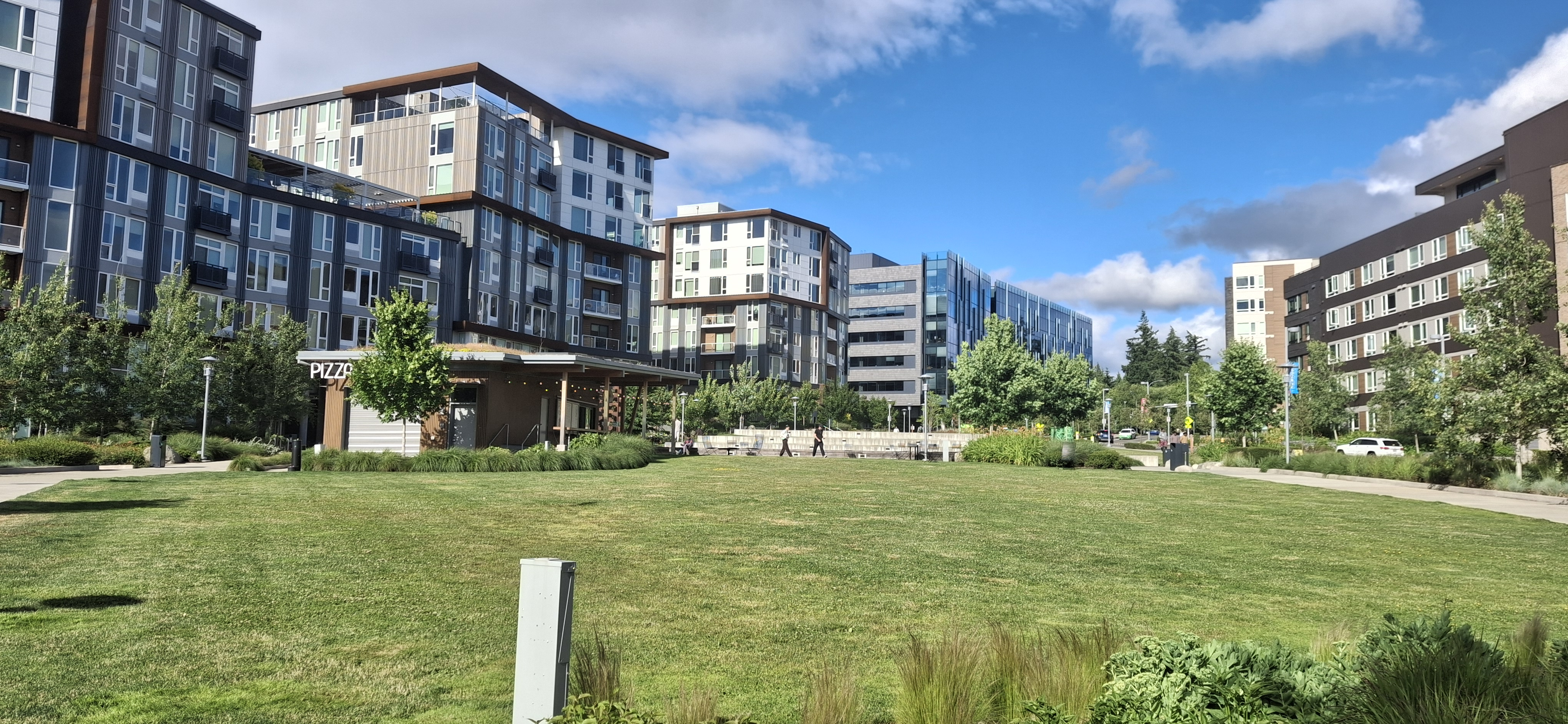
- Esterra Park as of June 2026
- Interactive map of Esterra Park
- Location: Redmond, Washington
- Coordinates: 47.63408°N 122.13745°W
- Status: Completed
- Constructed: 2014 onwards
- Use: Mixed-use development (office and housing)
- Website: esterrapark.com

Companies
- Developer: Capstone Partners

Technical details
- Cost: $900 million
- Buildings: 12
- Size: 28 acres (11 ha)
- Leasable area: 3.0 million square feet (280,000 m^{2})

Esterra Park is a transit-oriented development in the Overlake area of Redmond, Washington. The 28-acre (11 ha), 3.0 million square feet (280,000 m^{2}) project is near major regional shopping and employment centers and multiple modes of transportation, including the Overlake Village light rail station. The Esterra Park campus is expected to be home to a combined 8,000 residents and workers.

== Description ==
Esterra Park is part of the Overlake Village neighborhood in the Overlake area of Redmond, Washington, near Bellevue. The original plans for Esterra Park include 1.2 million square feet (110,000 m^{2}) of office, 25,000 square feet of retail, 1,400 residential units, a 250-room hotel, and a public park. Combined commercial space would be about 1.4 million square feet (130,000 m^{2}). Changes to the plans have increased the number of housing units to 2,900 while reducing office space.

Home to the headquarters of Microsoft and Nintendo of America and 48,000 jobs, Overlake is the 3rd-biggest regional growth center by number of jobs in the Central Puget Sound area, as established by the Puget Sound Regional Council. Overlake is expected to add 25,000 jobs and 5,000 residential units by 2030. Overlake Village is expected to be approximately half the size of Seattle's South Lake Union neighborhood and home to up to 40,000 people when finished. The Overlake Park & Ride and Overlake Transit Center are in the immediate area as well as numerous major employers and 1.5 million square feet (140,000 m^{2}) of retail within a one-mile radius, including the Overlake Shopping Center.

== Transportation ==
As a transit-oriented development (TOD), Esterra Park is in close proximity to multiple modes of transportation, including pedestrian, bicycle, auto, bus, as well as light rail. These modes include the King County Metro RapidRide B-Line bus service, the State Route 520 freeway and bike trail to downtown Redmond and Seattle, and the Sound Transit's 2 Line light rail project.

== History ==
The Esterra Park site was formerly a suburban medical campus of a regional health care provider, Group Health. The Overlake Village neighborhood was originally built in the 1960s and '70s and in recent years was zoned for higher density development as part of the City of Redmond's vision for the Overlake Urban Center. A master plan submitted to the city by Group Health for the redevelopment of the site, known as the Group Health-Overlake Village (Zone 4) Master Plan, was completed in December 2011. The Esterra Park project is "the first major redevelopment of Overlake Village."

Capstone Partners purchased the property from Group Health in March 2013 and during the same season began demolition of existing buildings on the site. Construction of the first building began around June 2014 followed by two further buildings as part of the first phase by the end of 2014. The entire project is expected to take several years to complete.

In 2017, it was reported that 500 residential units were already completed with an additional 1,000 units under construction and up to 1,400 more units planned in lieu of office space due to a simultaneous reduction in office demand and an increase in housing demand locally. The additional housing units would bring the community to a total of 2,900 homes.
