= Judkins Park station =

Light rail station in Seattle, Washington

54 Judkins Park
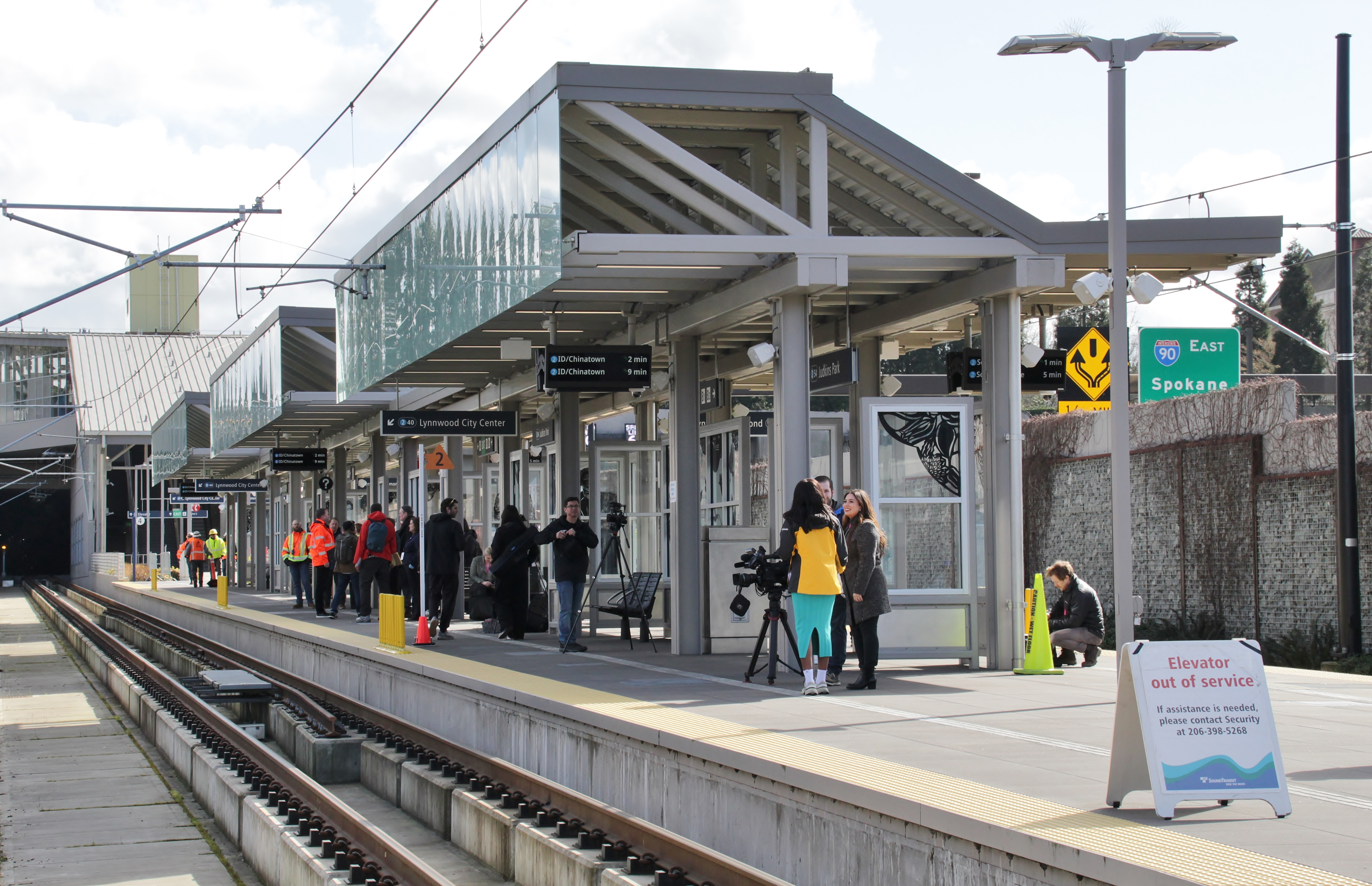
- The station's platform, seen from the west

General information
- Location: 1451 23rd Avenue South; Seattle, Washington, U.S.
- Coordinates: 47°35′25″N 122°18′07″W
- System: Link light rail
- Owner: Sound Transit
- Platforms: 1 island platform
- Tracks: 2
- Connections: King County Metro: 7, 8, 9, 48, 106

Construction
- Structure type: At-grade, highway median
- Accessible: Yes

History
- Opened: March 28, 2026

Services
Preceding station	Sound Transit	Following station
Link
International District/Chinatown toward Lynnwood City Center	2 Line	Mercer Island toward Downtown Redmond
Location

Judkins Park station is a light rail station on the 2 Line of the Link light rail system in Seattle, Washington, United States. An at-grade station, located in the median of Interstate 90 between Rainier Avenue S and 23rd Ave S, it serves the Central District neighborhood. It opened on March 28, 2026, along with the 2 Line Crosslake Extension over Lake Washington.

== Location ==
The station is located in the median of I-90 in the former express lanes just west of 23rd Ave South. It has entrances at 23rd Ave South and Rainier Ave South, and has a center platform including landscaping around it.
