= Salomón Huerta =

Mexican-American painter (born 1965)

- Born: 1965 (age 60–61); Tijuana, Mexico
- Education: ArtCenter College of Design; University of California, Los Angeles
- Known for: Painting

Salomón Huerta is a Mexican-American painter based in Los Angeles, California.

== Early life and education ==
Salomón Huerta was born in the La Colonia Libertad neighborhood in Tijuana, Mexico, in 1965, and moved to California at age four. He grew up in the Boyle Heights neighborhood of Los Angeles.

Huerta received a full scholarship to attend the ArtCenter College of Design, in Pasadena, California, where he earned a BFA in 1991. He completed his MFA from University of California, Los Angeles in 1998.

== Work ==
Huerta's work has appeared in and been reviewed by BOMB Magazine (2023), Los Angeles Times, Art in America, Art Limited, and Encore Magazine (July 2010).

Huerta has been featured in exhibitions and public programs in museums such as the Austin Museum of Art.

His work was included in the Whitney Biennial, New York, in 2000. In 2024, his work was included in the Pérez Art Museum Miami, Florida, and Los Angeles County Museum of Art, California, among others.

=== Let Everything Else Burn ===
In 2012, Huerta published the artist book Let Everything Else Burn, a collection of short autobiographical texts paired with well-known artworks and archived images concerning his personal history and past.

== Exhibitions ==
=== Solo exhibitions ===
- 2019 Humanizing the Other: Art by Salomón Huerta, Kwan Fong Gallery, Thousand Oaks, CA
- 2018 Still Lifes, There There, Los Angeles, CA
- 2014 Christopher Grimes Gallery, Santa Monica, CA
- 2008 Mask, Patrick Painter Inc., Santa Monica, CA
- 2005 Portrait of a Friend, Patricia Faure Gallery, Santa Monica, CA
- 2003 Patricia Faure Gallery, Santa Monica, CA
- 2002 Studio La Citta, Italy
- 2001 Gagosian Gallery, London; Salomon Huerta Paintings, Austin Museum of Art, Texas (catalogue)
- 2000 Patricia Faure Gallery, Santa Monica, CA
- 1999 Patricia Faure Gallery, Santa Monica, CA
- 1994 Julie Rico Gallery, Santa Monica, CA
- 1993 Julie Rico Gallery, Santa Monica, CA

=== Group exhibitions ===
- 2024 Xican-a.o.x. Body, Pérez Art Museum Miami, Florida
- 2019 Chicanismo!: The Sanchez Collection, AD&A Museum, UC Santa Barbara, Santa Barbara, CA
- 2017 Home—So Different, So Appealing: Art from the Americas since 1957, Los Angeles County Museum of Art, Los Angeles, CA
- 2011 So, Who Do You Think You Are?, San Jose Museum of Art, San Jose, CA
- 2010 A Group Painting Show, Patrick Painter, Inc., Santa Monica, CA
- 2009 Superficiality and Superexcrescence, Ben Maltz Gallery, Otis College of Art and Design, Los Angeles, CA; Here's Looking at You, Stephen Cohen Gallery, Los Angeles, CA
- 2008 My Generation, Spichernohe, Koln, Germany
- 2007 Strange New Worlds, Tijuana, Santa Monica Museum of Art, Santa Monica, CA; Exquisite Crisis and Encounters, Asian/Pacific/American Institute, NYU, New York, NY
- 2006 Strange New Worlds, Tijuana, La Jolla Museum, La Jolla CA; Transactions: Contemporary Latin American and Latino Art, Museum of Contemporary Art Diego, San Diego, CA; Retratos, San Antonio Museum, San Antonio, TX, Traveling: National Portrait Gallery at the S. Dillion Ripley Center, Smithsonian Institution, Washington, D.C.
- 2005 Group Show, Robert Miller, NY, NY; Group Show, El Museo del Barrio, NY, NY; Retratos, El Museo del Barrio, NY, NY; High Drama, Georgia Museum of Art, Athens, GA, Traveling to: McNay Art Museum, San Antonio, TX, Long Beach Museum of Art, Long Beach, CA, Allentown Art Museum, Allentown, Pa; New Watercolors, Patricia Faure Gallery, Santa Monica, CA
- 2004 White on White, Patricia Faure Gallery, Santa Monica, CA
- 2003 Intimates, Angles Gallery, Los Angeles, CA; The Great Drawing Show, Michael Kohn Gallery, Los Angeles, CA
- 2002 Art on Paper, Weatherspoon Art Museum, Greensboro, NC; Phoenix Triennial 2001, Contemporary Art: AZ CA MX NM TX, Phoenix Art Museum
- 2000 Studio la Città Verona; The Next Wave: New Painting in Southern California, California Center for the Arts Escondido; East of the River: Chicano Art Collectors Anonymous, Santa Monica Museum of Art; Whitney Biennial, Whitney Museum of American Art, NY NY
- 1999 Five Countries and One City, Mexico City Museum Mexico City
- 1998 Patricia Faure Gallery Santa Monica
- 1997 LA Current, Armand Hammer Museum Gallery Westwood
- 1995 Vital Signs, Municipal Art Gallery Los Angeles
- 1994 El Expectio Chicano, Mt. San Antonio College Pomona

== Collections (selection) ==
- Whitney Museum of American Art, New York, NY
- The Museum of Contemporary Art, Los Angeles, CA
- Los Angeles County Museum of Art, Los Angeles, CA
- Museum of Contemporary Art, San Diego, La Jolla, CA
- Ulrich Museum of Art, Wichita, KS
- Worcester Museum of Art, Worcester, MA
- Colby College Museum of Art, Waterville, ME
- CAA, Beverly Hills, CA
- Fisher Gallery, University of Southern California, Los Angeles, CA
