= Betty Asher =

American art collector and dealer

Betty Asher (May 6, 1914 – 1994) was an American art collector and dealer. An ardent supporter of Pop art and Contemporary art, her large collection of cups and saucers by artists was world-famous.

== Biography ==
Asher was born in Chicago on May 4, 1914. The family lived behind the drugstore. Asher attended a normal school (teacher training college) in Chicago for one year before beginning training to become a nurse at Michael Reese Hospital in Chicago. She graduated as an RN and spent about four years in private nursing.

In 1939, she married Dr. Leonard Asher. They moved to Los Angeles in 1941. The couple had two children, Rayna Asher (Allen) and Michael Asher (who would become a well known conceptual artist), and four granddaughters, Pamela, Debra, Rebecca and Taura.

Aside from being a collector, she was curatorial assistant at the Los Angeles County Museum of Art for 13 years (1966–79), and co-founded and co-owned Asher-Faure Gallery with Patricia Faure from 1979 to 1990.

Asher died at her home in Beverly Hills on May 11, 1994. Her papers were donated to the Getty Research Institute in 2010.
