= East Main station =

Light rail station in Bellevue, Washington

57 East Main
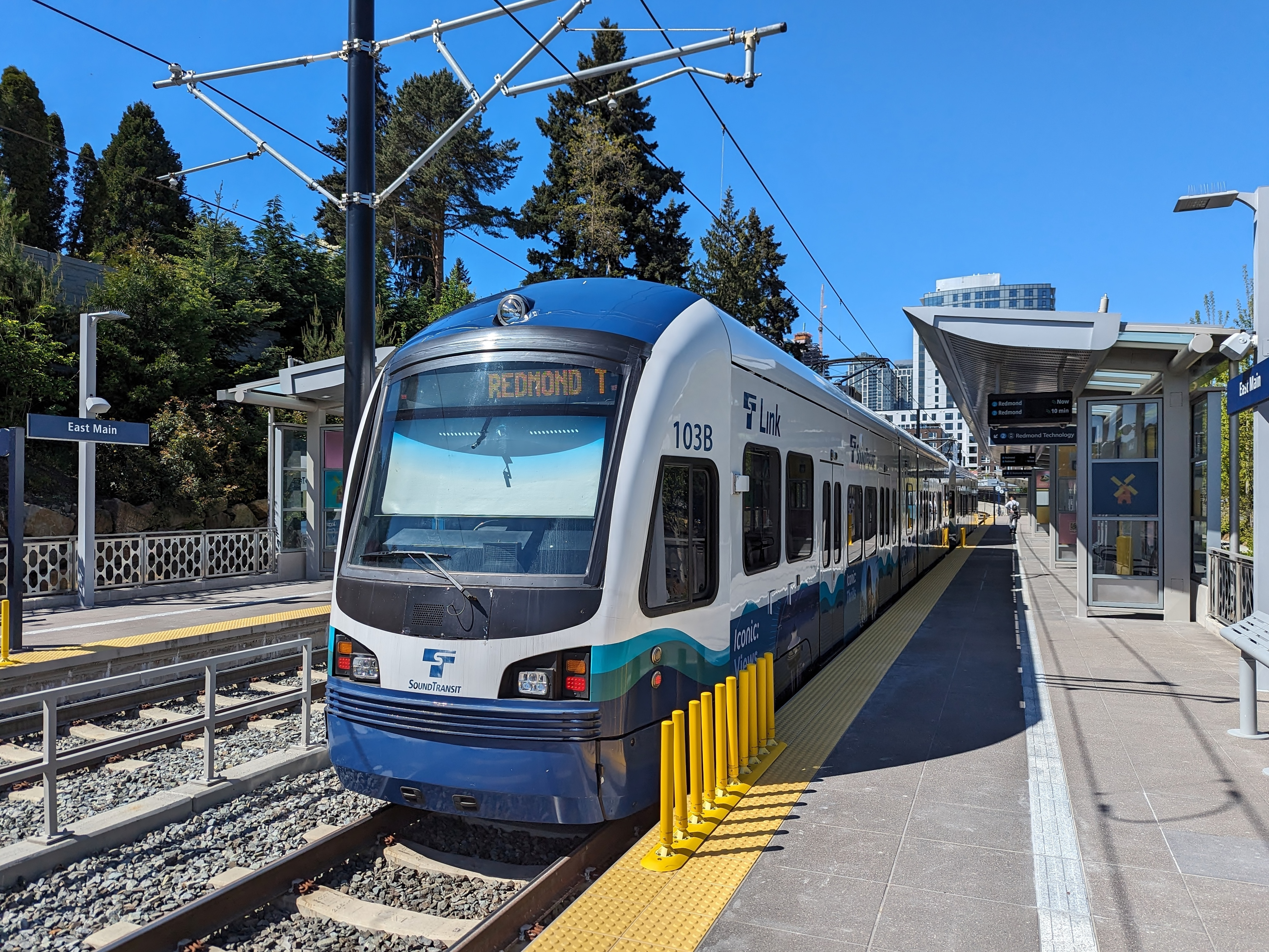
- The eastbound platform at East Main station

General information
- Location: 229 112th Avenue Southeast; Bellevue, Washington; United States
- Coordinates: 47°36′29″N 122°11′28″W
- System: Link light rail
- Owner: Sound Transit
- Platforms: 2 side platforms
- Tracks: 2
- Connections: King County Metro

Construction
- Structure type: At-grade
- Accessible: Yes

History
- Opened: April 27, 2024

Passengers
- 208 daily weekday boardings (2025); 67,757 total boardings (2025)

Services
| Preceding station | Sound Transit | Following station |
Link
| South Bellevue toward Lynnwood City Center | 2 Line | Bellevue Downtown toward Downtown Redmond |
Location

East Main station is an at-grade light rail station in Bellevue, Washington, United States. It is served by the 2 Line, part of Sound Transit's Link light rail system, and opened on April 27, 2024.

== Location ==
The station is located along the west side of 112th Avenue Southeast south of Main Street, just west of Interstate 405 on the outskirts of Downtown Bellevue. East Main is an at-grade station but lies at the south end of the Downtown Bellevue tunnel. The ballot measure that approved East Link in 2008 initially planned for the Downtown Bellevue portion of the route to be at-grade, however, the City of Bellevue committed to $185 million in cost-sharing to finance the tunnel. An early concept for the station placed it at Southeast 8th Street, but it was moved north towards Main Street in 2011.

The station offers similar amenities to existing Link light rail stations, including ticket vending machines, bicycle parking, and public art. A new park over the portal of the Downtown Bellevue tunnel was constructed and incorporates a new multi-use path to connect the station to Main Street and the nearby Surrey Downs neighborhood.
