= South Bellevue station =

Light rail station in Bellevue, Washington

56 South Bellevue
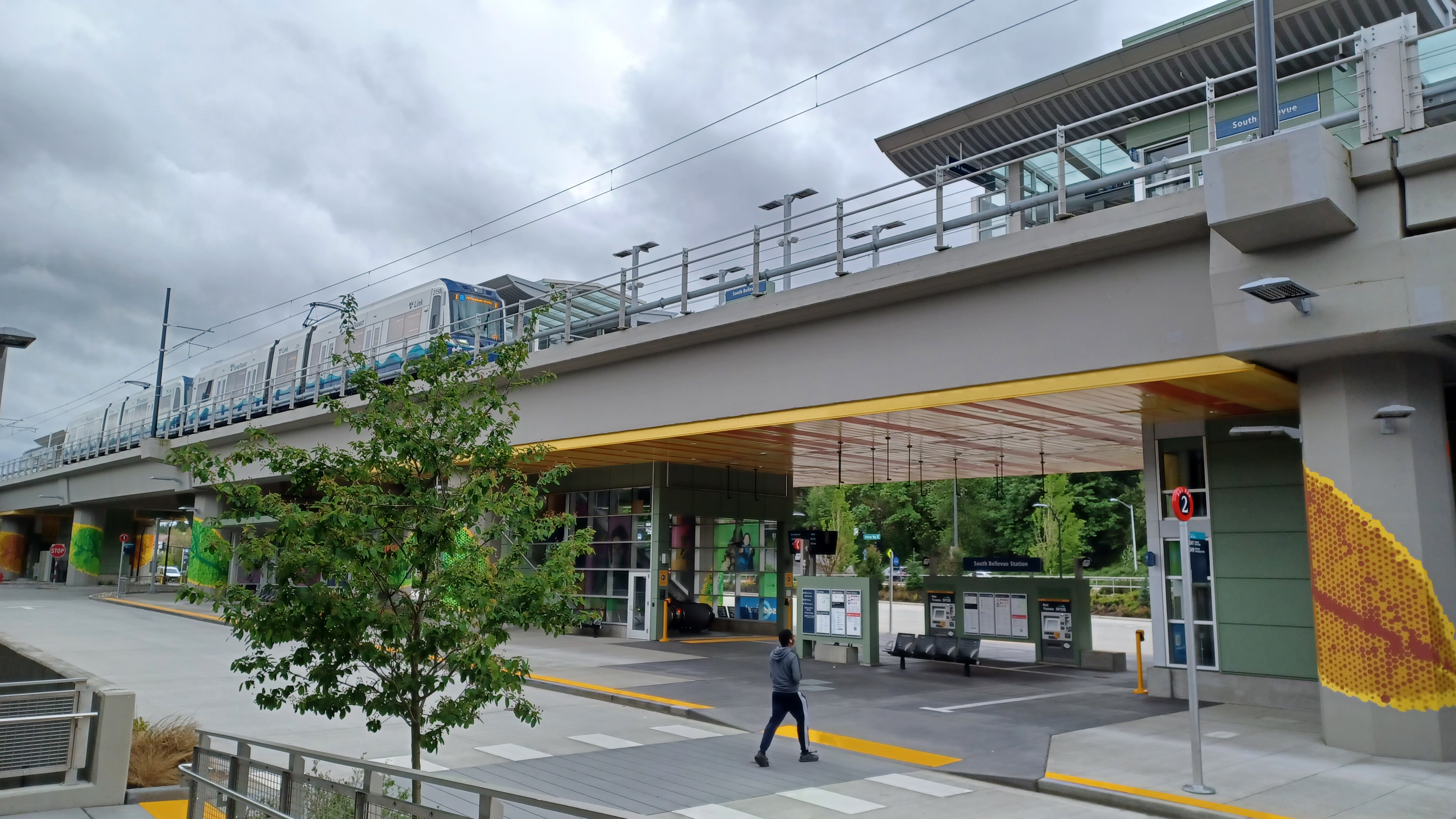
- Station shortly after opening in April 2024

General information
- Location: 2704 Bellevue Way Southeast; Bellevue, Washington; United States
- Coordinates: 47°35′11″N 122°11′25″W
- System: Link light rail
- Owner: Sound Transit
- Platforms: 1 island platform
- Tracks: 2
- Train operators: Sound Transit
- Bus routes: 7
- Bus stands: 3
- Bus operators: Sound Transit Express, King County Metro

Construction
- Structure type: Elevated
- Parking: 1,500 stalls
- Accessible: Yes

History
- Opened: April 27, 2024

Passengers
- 902 daily weekday boardings (2025); 306,694 total boardings (2025)

Services
Preceding station	Sound Transit	Following station
Link
Mercer Island toward Lynnwood City Center	2 Line	East Main toward Downtown Redmond
Location

South Bellevue station is an elevated light rail station located in Bellevue, Washington, United States. It is served by the 2 Line of Sound Transit's Link light rail system, which connects Seattle to the Eastside suburbs. The elevated station has a single platform, a park and ride garage with 1,500 stalls, and bus bays served by King County Metro and Sound Transit Express routes.

The original park and ride opened on January 30, 1981, with 337 stalls to serve express routes between Downtown Seattle and Bellevue. It had low use for several years, but eventually reached capacity and was expanded to 419 stalls by the late 1990s. South Bellevue was included as the site of a light rail station in various proposals prior to the approval of East Link (now the 2 Line) in 2008. The park and ride lot closed in May 2017 for construction of the light rail station and parking garage, which opened in November 2021. Light rail service began on April 27, 2024, with South Bellevue remaining the western terminus of the 2 Line until 2026.

== Location ==
South Bellevue station is situated on the east side of Bellevue Way near its interchange with Interstate 90 south of Downtown Bellevue. The light rail tracks and Bellevue Way form the boundary between the residential neighborhood of Enatai to the west and the Mercer Slough Nature Park to the east. The Mercer Slough includes freshwater wetlands, an education center, walking trails, a boat launch, and a blueberry farm. The town of Beaux Arts Village is located a one-half-mile (0.80 km) to the west; the Bellefield office park and historic Frederick W. Winters House are both north of the station site.

According to 2013 data from the Puget Sound Regional Council, the area within 1/2 mile (0.8 km) of the station has a population of 1,708 people and no recorded jobs. The area is split between single-family homes in Enatai to the west and the protected areas of the Mercer Slough Nature Park to the east. The Enatai neighborhood developed in the 1950s and 1960s using winding streets and landscaping to impede through traffic. The city government's 2016 plan for the station area does not include land use changes for the neighborhood and calls for improved pedestrian and bicycling facilities. A high-occupancy vehicle lane southbound on Bellevue Way connects the station to westbound Interstate 90. The plan also proposed a residential parking zone with issued permits to prevent park-and-ride commuters from using street parking in the neighborhood.

== History ==
=== Park and ride ===
Metro Transit, the countywide bus operator for King County, began development of permanent park and ride lots in the 1970s and selected southern Bellevue as one of 18 potential markets. Two sites along Bellevue Way at Southeast 27th Place and Southeast 30th Street were proposed in 1977 by Metro and the Washington State Department of Transportation (WSDOT). The first site, a 12-acre (4.9 ha) farm in the Mercer Slough on the east side of Bellevue Way, was selected for development of a 400-stall park and ride, which was downsized from 630 stalls after a request from the City of Bellevue. The site's selection was criticized by a local community club, who were concerned with additional bus traffic and the aesthetics of the lot amongst farms and wetlands.

The South Bellevue Park & Ride opened on January 30, 1981, with 337 stalls and cost $2.3 million to construct using mitigation funds from the construction of Interstate 90. The lot served existing express routes that connected Bellevue to Downtown Seattle as well as a new route that spanned the entire Interstate 405 corridor from Aurora Village in Shoreline to the Southcenter Mall in Tukwila. By the end of the year, a new turn lane and widened entrance were completed by Metro. South Bellevue was described by The Seattle Times as "one of Metro's most dismal failures in attracting park and ride customers" due to its limited routes. Route 226, a major Seattle–Bellevue express service, was rerouted to South Bellevue in 1982 to encourage more use. In 1983, an average of 39 stalls (11% of capacity) were used daily by commuters; the figure grew to 66 stalls (18%) the following year. In the late 1980s and early 1990s, Metro used the park and ride as a terminus for free "shopper" buses serving the Bellevue Square shopping center and shuttles for major events in Downtown Bellevue and Seattle.

In 1994, King County Metro added 108 stalls to the park and ride, which was regularly filled on weekdays. An additional 50 stalls opened for use in May 1997 and was supplemented by a set of leased spaces at a nearby church parking lot. A parking garage for the South Bellevue lot was proposed during the same time to meet projected demand but faced opposition from Bellevue mayor Ron Smith. By 1999, the lot was used by a daily average of 574 vehicles—over the listed capacity—and drivers resorted to illegally parking along fire lanes or on grass. Metro also proposed repainting the parking lot to fit an additional 50 stalls, but the plan was rejected due to concerns about the width of modern vehicles.

The opening of new park and ride lots in Eastgate and Issaquah in 2004 and 2006, respectively, were expected to ease overcrowding issues at South Bellevue. The South Bellevue park and ride remained filled on weekdays, with 107 percent of its listed 519 stalls used on an average weekday in late 2016. Approximately 44 percent of its users drove 5 miles (8.0 km) or more to access the lot according to a 2013 survey of recorded license plates. As of 2017, South Bellevue Park and Ride was served by four Sound Transit Express routes and three King County Metro routes with connections to Downtown Seattle, the University District, Overlake, and Issaquah.

=== Light rail planning ===
The Forward Thrust plan for rapid transit, which was rejected by voters in 1968 and 1970, included a line from Seattle to Bellevue on the Interstate 90 corridor with a park and ride station serving Enatai. The second iteration of the plan 2.6-mile (4.2 km) spur line would have split off at Enatai to serve a station at Eastgate with a 1,200-stall parking garage. A light rail plan drafted by Metro and the Puget Sound Council of Governments in 1986 also included a South Bellevue station on its Seattle–Bellevue line, which continued onward to Bothell and Redmond. In 1990, Metro proposed a rapid transit station—either for a busway or light rail system—at the site of the South Bellevue park and ride as part of a long-range plan for Eastside transit.

In 1995, the Regional Transit Authority (now Sound Transit) presented a $6.7 billion ballot measure that included a light rail line connecting Seattle to Bellevue and Overlake with a station serving South Bellevue. The proposal was rejected by voters, but the smaller Sound Move package passed in November 1996 to fund construction of a scaled-back Link light rail system with provisions for future expansions. In 2005, Sound Transit adopted a long-range plan with a designated Seattle–Bellevue–Overlake corridor for high-capacity transit that would use the Interstate 90 floating bridge. A light rail extension was chosen the following year in lieu of a proposed bus rapid transit line, which would have been designed for conversion to rail at a later date. The light rail project, named the East Link Extension, was part of the 2007 Roads and Transit ballot measure that was rejected by voters. A transit-only version of the ballot measure, named Sound Transit 2, was passed the following year with a station in South Bellevue on the Seattle–Overlake line.

The routing of the project's South Bellevue segment, generally between the East Channel Bridge and Main Street in Downtown Bellevue, was debated for several years by city officials and Sound Transit. An at-grade station at South Bellevue was initially endorsed by the city council in February 2009 and adopted by the Sound Transit Board in May with plans to further evaluate its placement. An alternate alignment on the Woodinville Subdivision or near I-405 was proposed in early 2010 by new councilmembers elected in November 2009 with support from Bellevue Square developer Kemper Freeman; the councilmembers in favor of the new alignment held a 4–3 majority. The concept eliminated the South Bellevue station and did not initially provide a replacement; a later version adopted by the city council as their locally preferred alternative in March 2010 included a station at the South Bellevue Way interchange with I-90.

The Sound Transit Board voted to continue analysis of the Bellevue Way routing while the city government prepared their own study of South Bellevue station alternatives that was published in July 2010. The study found that a station at the South Bellevue interchange would cost $170 million to $210 million—more than the baseline cost of $130 million for Sound Transit's alternative—and cause significant impacts to nearby areas, including Mercer Slough. The city council remained split on the South Bellevue alignment until an additional study from the city found a $138 million cost increase. In July 2011, Sound Transit and the city government tentatively agreed to adopt the Bellevue Way and 112th Avenue alignment with additional noise and traffic mitigation for some neighborhoods. The full memorandum of understanding was approved by both parties in November 2011 and the final routing was adopted in April 2013 with several cost-reducing design modifications. A lawsuit filed by residents in South Bellevue over the visual impacts of light rail construction was rejected by a U.S. District Court judge in 2013, allowing for plans to continue.

=== Light rail design and construction ===
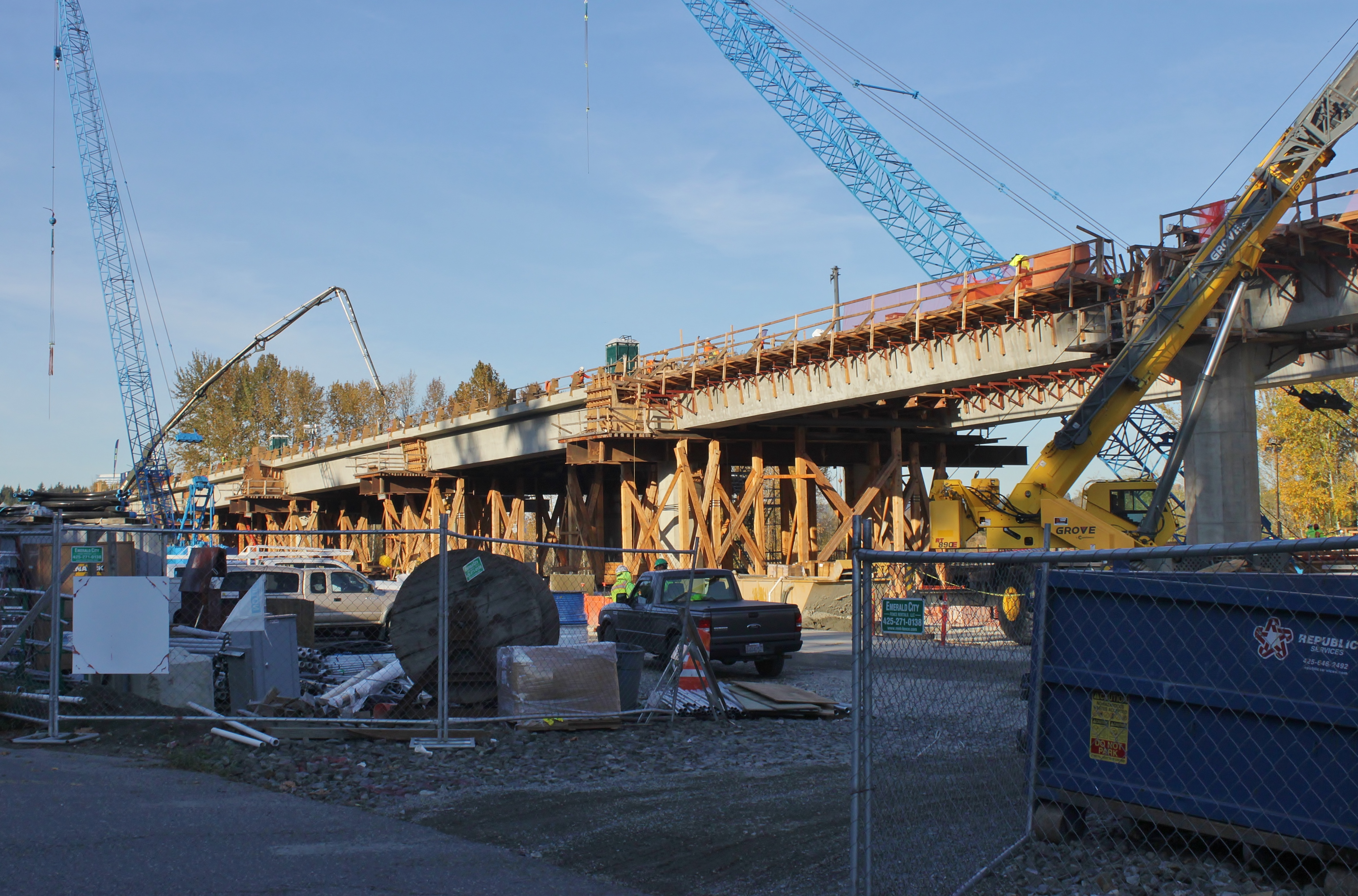
Under construction in November 2018

The first designs for South Bellevue station were released in late 2013; the city government also began planning for future development and construction mitigation around the station. The finalized design for the station, its public artwork, and a five-story parking garage were unveiled in November 2014. As part of the project, Sound Transit also acquired 2 acres (0.81 ha) of Mercer Slough Nature Park from the city government in exchange for additional land near the garage. The agency also paid for the restoration of a produce barn and public restrooms in the park. The construction contract for the South Bellevue section, which comprised the station, 2.2 miles (3.5 km) of elevated trackway, and the parking garage, was awarded to a joint venture of Shimmick Construction and Parsons for $321 million in October 2016. The section also includes a crossing of the westbound lanes of Interstate 90 that uses a curved, 600-foot (180 m) balanced cantilever bridge built through form-traveler gantries.

Utility relocation near the station area began in June 2016 with the removal of overhead lines by Puget Sound Energy. The South Bellevue park and ride closed on May 30, 2017, for light rail construction at the site. Buses continued to serve Bellevue Way but were moved from the center island to on-street stops. To mitigate the loss of parking, Sound Transit leased 367 stalls from eight churches in Bellevue and Renton, added trips to other express routes, and directed users to other park-and-ride lots with spare capacity. An additional lot opened in January 2018 with 50 more stalls. An earlier plan to build a satellite lot on Mercer Island was rejected following protests from residents who opposed the loss of parkland for the project. A temporary lot was opened south of the station site in July to serve visitors to Mercer Slough Nature Park as part of Sound Transit's construction mitigation plan.

On-site construction began in June 2017 with the preparation of work areas and installation of fencing. The historic Frederick W. Winters House and blueberry farms in Mercer Slough Nature Park closed to visitors in October to prepare for light rail construction along Bellevue Way. Utility relocation was completed in early 2018 and was followed by the start of column construction, which required long-term lane closures on Bellevue Way; the street was arranged to have two lanes open in the peak direction and one lane in each direction during mid-day. The installation of precast concrete girders to support the trackway and platform at the station began in mid-July; the parking garage was constructed in two phases, beginning with the north half in 2018. In 2019, the parking garage was topped out and work on the station's elevators and escalators began; Sound Transit also restored 6 acres (2.4 ha) of wetlands in Mercer Slough Nature Park as part of mitigation for the project. By the end of the year, the South Bellevue contract had reached 77 percent completion and tracks were installed on elevated sections. The traction power substation to power the overhead lines for the light rail vehicles was delivered to the South Bellevue station site in April 2021.

Sound Transit opened the bus loop and 1,500-stall parking garage at South Bellevue station on November 15, 2021, per an agreement with the city government to restore parking capacity sooner. Work continued on trackwork, the station platform, and various communications and electrical systems during the commissioning process. The project reached substantial completion in August 2022; it had originally been scheduled to reach the milestone in January 2021, but was delayed due to the COVID-19 pandemic and a concrete workers' strike. During platform work that began in February 2023, a contractor discovered that the installed floor tiles at the station had come loose and posed a tripping hazard. Sound Transit later found that the tactile edge markers had not been rated for outdoor use and other tiles had buckled in hot weather, requiring full replacement. A $3 million contract was awarded to Balfour Beatty to demolish and replace the platform tiles, which began in September 2023. Train testing on the South Bellevue section began in November 2023.

=== Opening ===
South Bellevue station opened in on April 27, 2024, as the terminus of the 2 Line's initial segment, which runs north to Downtown Bellevue and east to Redmond Technology station. As part of the opening celebrations, the station hosted live music, pop-up exhibits from the Pacific Science Center, and a Port of Seattle firetruck. It was also the terminus of a shuttle to Bellevue Downtown station prior to the ribbon-cutting. The shortened line, made necessary by construction issues on the Seattle–Bellevue section on Interstate 90, was announced in August 2023; the full line opened in 2026. The station is anticipated to have 4,500 daily boardings by 2030.

The entrances to South Bellevue station were temporarily closed on a rotating basis in December 2024 to replace expansion joint covers in the stairwell and elevator.

== Station layout ==
South Bellevue station is located on the east side of Bellevue Way at an intersection with 112th Avenue Southeast, north of the street's interchange with Interstate 90. It includes an elevated light rail station, bus bays, a drop-off parking area, and an adjacent parking garage to the east. The island platform is 35.5 feet (10.8 m) above street level and connected by a set of stairs, escalators, and elevators with no mezzanine. Two bus bays are located under the north half of the platform and also include layover parking for buses and paratransit vehicles; a third bay is on the northbound side of Bellevue Way. The parking garage is five stories tall and includes 1,500 vehicle stalls; its lower two levels are below street level. Three access roads connect the garage and bus bays to Bellevue Way, including two with signalized intersections. A bicycle locker with 35 spaces is also available at the station.

The station was designed by a joint venture of HNTB, Jacobs, and Mott MacDonald. It features several pieces of public art that was funded by the "STart" program, which allocates a percent of construction costs for artwork. The west side of the platform is shielded by 900 feet (270 m) of metal acoustic panels designed by Vicki Scuri that use repeated hexagonal patterns that reflect the seasonal leaf colors of the Mercer Slough; the northern half uses gold to reflect autumn, while the southern half uses green for spring. The panels are made in Olympia with porcelain enamel on steel panels and are each 6 feet (1.8 m) tall. Artist Katy Stone designed metal screens for the garage facade that resemble ripples in water and metal sculptures on the garage roof that are inspired by cattails and reeds in the wind.

== Services ==
The station is served by the 2 Line of the Link light rail system, which connects Lynnwood and Seattle to the Eastside. South Bellevue is located between Mercer Island station to the west and East Main station to the north. Trains on the 2 Line serve South Bellevue station 20 hours a day on weekdays and Saturdays, from approximately 4:30 a.m. to 12:30 a.m.; and 18 hours on Sundays, from 6:00 a.m. to 12:00 a.m. During regular weekday service, trains operate roughly every eight minutes during rush hour, ten minutes during midday operation, and twelve to fifteen minutes in the early morning and at night. The station is approximately 21 minutes from Westlake station in Downtown Seattle, 7 minutes from Bellevue Downtown station, and 25 minutes from Downtown Redmond station. In 2025, an average of 902 passengers boarded Link trains at South Bellevue station on weekdays.

South Bellevue station is also a major bus hub with seven routes operated by Sound Transit Express and King County Metro. Sound Transit Express route 556 provides limited-stop service to Downtown Bellevue and Issaquah; a night bus, route 547, stops at most of the 2 Line stations between Seattle and Redmond during hours without light rail service. King County Metro's routes provide service to Downtown Bellevue, Kirkland, Factoria, Eastgate, Issaquah, Newcastle, and Renton. The agency also operates a seasonal shuttle service, named Trailhead Direct, that runs during the summer months and connects the station to the Issaquah Alps and Mount Si hiking areas. A shuttle bus operated between 2 Line stations during service disruptions stops at South Bellevue's bus bays 2 and 3.
