= Bellevue Transit Center =

Bus and light rail station in downtown Bellevue, Washington

58 Bellevue Downtown
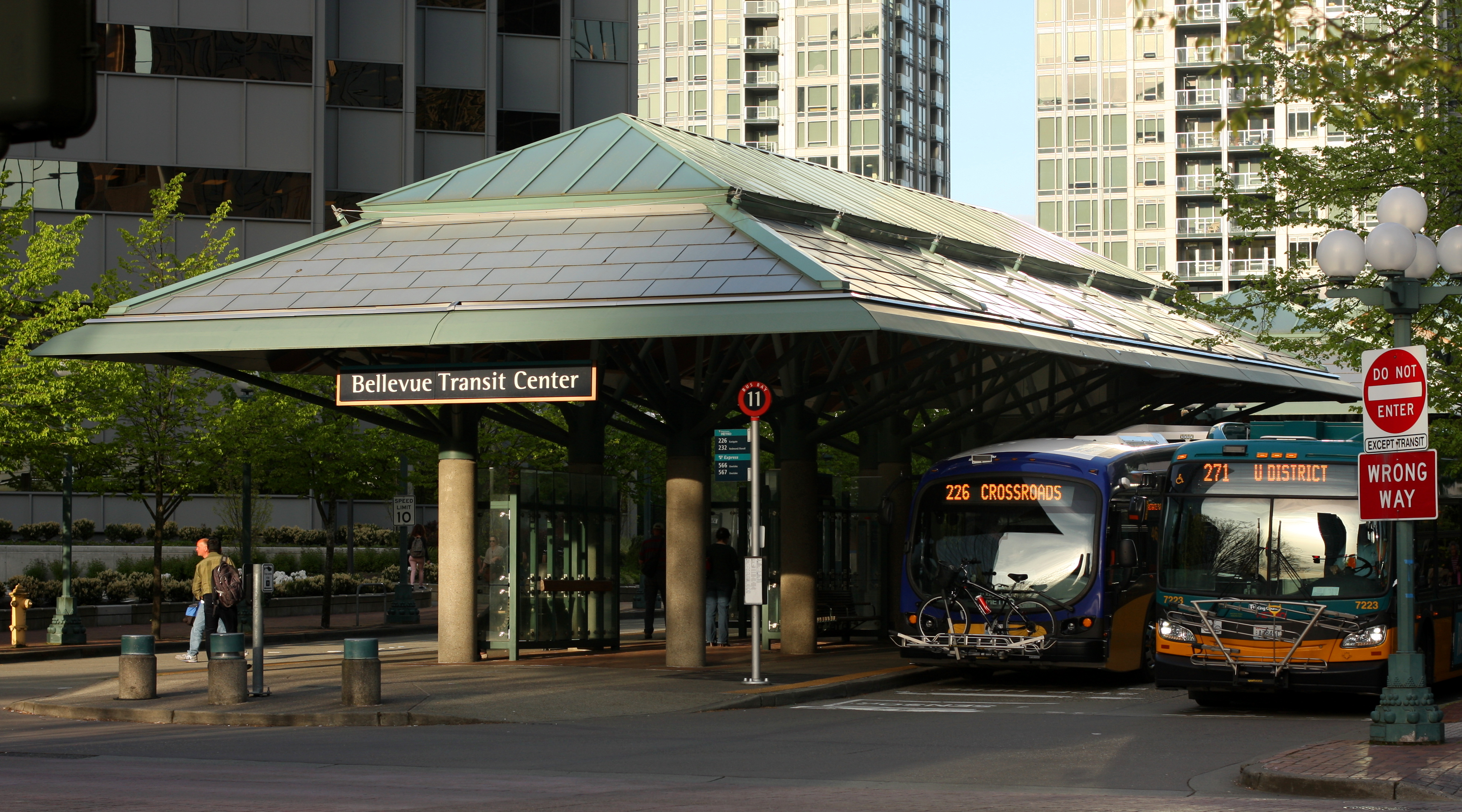
- View of Bellevue Transit Center from 108th Ave NE.

General information
- Location: 594 110th Avenue Northeast; Bellevue, Washington; United States
- Coordinates: 47°36′55″N 122°11′31″W
- System: Link light rail
- Platforms: 2 side platforms
- Tracks: 2
- Train operators: Sound Transit
- Bus routes: 20
- Bus stands: 12
- Bus operators: King County Metro (RapidRide); Sound Transit Express

Construction
- Cycle facilities: Bicycle lockers and racks
- Accessible: Yes

History
- Opened: 1985 (buses); April 27, 2024 (light rail)
- Rebuilt: 2002, 2017–2024

Passengers
- 1,303 daily weekday boardings (2025); 391,219 total boardings (2025)

Services
Preceding station	Sound Transit	Following station
Link
East Main toward Lynnwood City Center	2 Line	Wilburton toward Downtown Redmond
Location

Bellevue Transit Center (BTC) is a bus station and light rail station in Bellevue, Washington, a suburb of Seattle. It is the main transit hub for the Eastside of King County, serving 20 routes from King County Metro and Sound Transit Express. The transit center is the western terminus of the RapidRide B Line, which runs east to Redmond.

A Link light rail station, named Bellevue Downtown, was built to the east of the transit center near the Bellevue City Hall. The station is at the east portal of the Downtown Bellevue tunnel and has two entrances at 110th and 112th avenues. It opened in 2024 as part of the initial starter segment of the 2 Line. The Stride bus rapid transit system will have two lines that terminate at the transit center.

== Location ==
The bus platforms for Bellevue Transit Center are located on one block of Northeast 6th Street between Northeast 108th Street and Northeast 110th Street in Downtown Bellevue.

== History ==
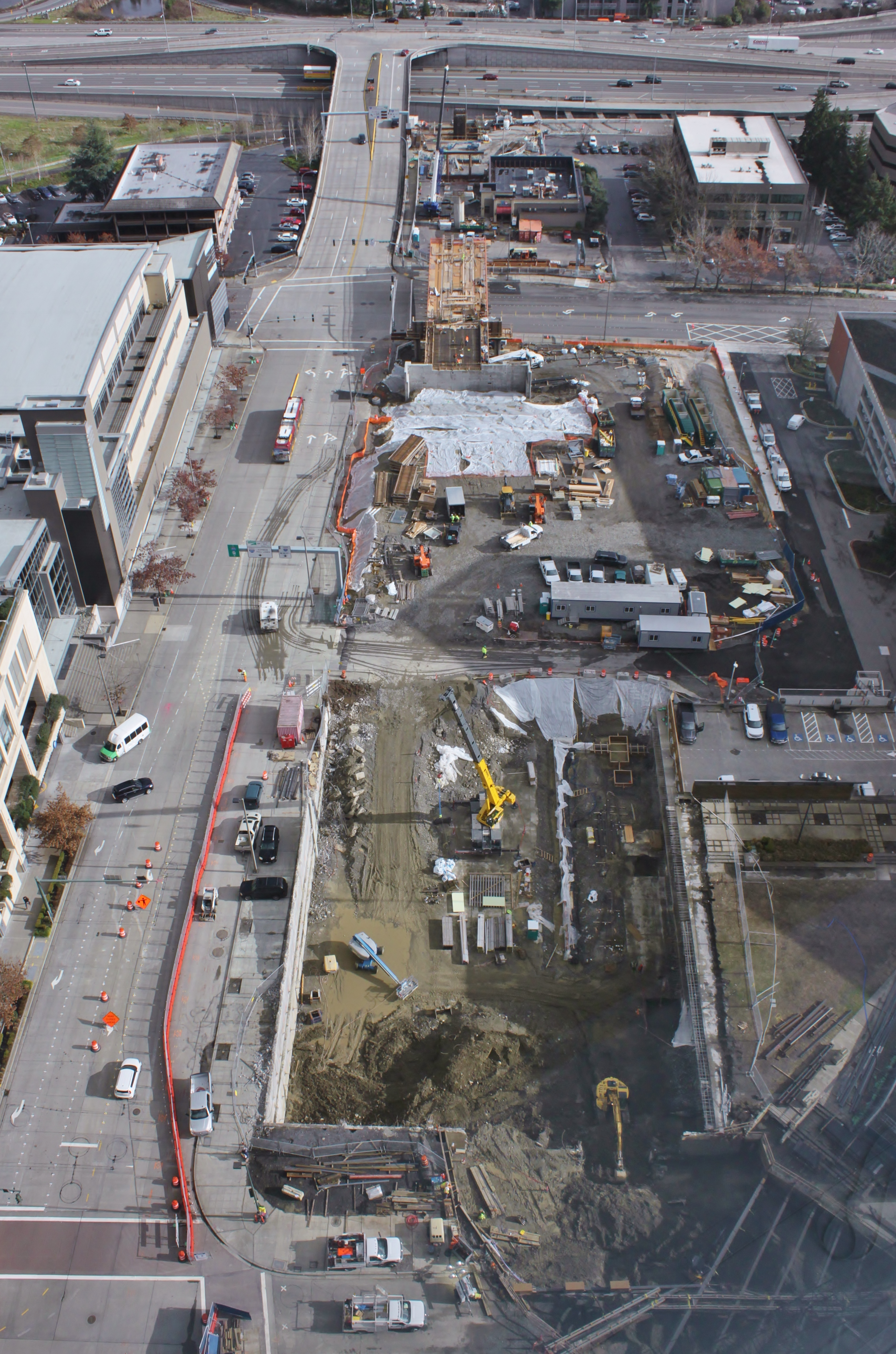
Link light rail station under construction in 2018

The original transit center in downtown Bellevue was opened in 1985, at a cost of $5 million, consisting of 6 bus bays on Northeast 6th Street. It was preceded by a temporary transit hub near the Puget Power Building established in 1982.

A new, $21 million transit center was built on the site in 2002, adding additional bus bays and modernizing the facility as part of the Sound Transit Express program. The following year, additional amenities were added to the transit center as part of the project's second phase; a customer service kiosk, bicycle facilities, a public restroom, and a police station were added. A city-funded travel assistance service was based out of the facility beginning in 2008. The center closed in December 2020 for light rail construction.

A direct access ramp from Northeast 6th Street to Interstate 405 for buses and carpools was also opened in 2004. To accommodate the ramp's height, the nearby Northeast 4th Street overpass was demolished and replaced.

== Light rail ==
Bellevue Transit Center was selected as the site of a light rail station as part of the East Link Extension, funded by a regional vote in 2008. Construction began in 2017. The station, to be named Bellevue Downtown station, would be located to the east of the current transit center, along Northeast 6th Street between 110th and 112th avenues on the north side of the Bellevue City Hall. It would be at the east end of a tunnel under downtown Bellevue and the west end of an elevated bridge across Interstate 405 leading towards Wilburton station. The station would have two entrances, on 110th and 112th, and comprise two side platforms.

The ballot measure that approved East Link in 2008 only included money for an at-grade alignment in Downtown Bellevue, leaving a $100 million to $200 million funding shortfall for a tunneled option that would have to be funded by an external source. The city of Bellevue agreed to fund the remainder, but the placement of the station remained controversial as leaders were split between a tunneled station closer to the city center, a surface alignment, and an elevated station along I-405. The final routing was approved in 2013 by the Bellevue City Council and Sound Transit, choosing an open-air station that would save $19 to $33 million compared to one inside the tunnel.

The station opened on April 27, 2024, as part of the initial segment of the 2 Line between South Bellevue and Redmond Technology stations.

== Bus rapid transit ==
Bellevue Transit Center is the terminus of the RapidRide B Line, a bus rapid transit route that connects Downtown Bellevue to Crossroads, Overlake, and Downtown Redmond. The RapidRide line opened in 2011 and is operated by King County Metro. An additional RapidRide service, the K Line, is scheduled to open in 2030 and will connect the transit center to Eastgate, Kirkland, and Totem Lake.

Sound Transit's bus rapid transit system, Stride, will have two lines that terminate at Bellevue Transit Center: the S1 Line, which opens in 2028 and will connect to Renton and Burien; and the S2 Line, which opens in 2029 and will connect to Bothell and Lynnwood. Construction at the transit center's future Stride bays began in July 2026 with modifications to the sidewalk and canopy structures. Several bus bays were temporarily relocated to 110th Avenue Northeast during the construction process.
