= Mattia Biagi =

Italian artist

Mattia Biagi (born 1974 in Ravenna) is an Italian professional artist. He currently resides and works in Los Angeles.

== Professional background ==
Biagi's work is shown internationally at galleries and museums such as The Mint Museum of Craft + Design in Charlotte, North Carolina.

Not long after graduating art and design school in Milan, Mattia Biagi arrived in Los Angeles. He was immediately impressed by one of the city’s most famous landmarks, the La Brea Tar Pits, which became the influence for his initial body of work in the U.S.

"I was intrigued with tar as a medium and how it illuminates and highlights objects in a very esoteric and ethereal sense."

The mix of a traditional Italian background with life in America has made quite an impact on his creative process.

In this new body of work, Biagi explores through multi-media forms the desire to make tangible a belief in supernatural causality and its cultural nuances.

By traversing abstract sculpture, video, painting, photography and performance he will investigate human emotional reaction to physical objects that have superstitious associations.

== Galleries and exhibits ==
=== Solo exhibitions ===
2007:	Edie And Andy, Deborah Page Gallery, Santa Monica, California

2008:	We All Are Guilty, We All Are Victims, And I Am The First One, Los Angeles, California
	Rose Like A Phoenix From The Ashes, Anna Kustera Gallery, New York City

2009:	Sweet Dreams Are Made Of These, Holster Projects Gallery, London, England
	Panni Stesi, Red Building, Los Angeles, California

2010:	Recognize Your Spiritual Need, Rediscover Your Faith In Your Religion, Holster Projects Gallery, London, England

2011:	Solo Show, Officine dell’Immagine – SCOPE Basel 2011, Switzerland
	Storm Of Life, Italian institute of culture, Los Angeles, California
	Freedom, LA Art Show, Los Angeles, California
	Black Tar, Officine dell'Immagine, Milan, Italy

2012:	Welcome To The Jungle, New Gallery Of Modern Art, Los Angeles, California

2013:	Someone Told Me Never To Do It, Anna Kustera Gallery, New York City
	Family Business, New York City

=== Group exhibitions ===
2005:	Don O Melveny Gallery, Los Angeles, California

2006:	Red Dot, Patricia Faure Gallery, New York City
	Patricia Faure Gallery, Santa Monica, California

2007:	Art Basel, Miami, Florida
	The Black Market Show, Anna Kustera Gallery, New York City
	High And Dry, Smoke And Fog, Phantom Galleries, Los Angeles, California
	Shippensburg University, Shippensburg, Pennsylvania
	Stephen F. Austin State University, Austin, Texas
	Harper College, Palatine, Illinois

2009:	Sweet Dreams Are Made of These, Holster Projects Gallery, London

2010:	ART Tokyo, Berengo Gallery, Tokyo

2011:	From White To Black, Castello di Rivara, Turin, Italy
	B-B-BAD: Anna Kustera Gallery, New York City
	MYSTERIOUS OBJECTS: Santa Ana College, Santa Ana, California
	SU NERO NERO: Foundation Franz Paludetto, Rome

2012:	Fairy-tales, Fantasy & Fear, Mint Museum Uptown Charlotte, North Carolina

2013:	Le Dictateur, Palais de Tokyo, Paris, France

== Public and Selected Notable Private Collections ==
Before Midnight - Mint Museum - North Carolina - NC (2012)

== Print media ==
2005:	LA Confidential
	Surface Magazine, Issue No. 54
2006:	Le vie dell’auto (Italy)
	Los Angeles Times, Home Section, March 30
	Pop Life Magazine, Issue No. 1
	Angeleno Magazine
	Interior Design, Issue No. 14, November 1
	Interior Design, Issue No. 6, May 31
	Flaunt Magazine, Issue No. 71
	ArtTravel, Issue No. 11
2007:	Maison et Objet Paris, Inspirations Book (Cahier d’Inspirations), No. 10: Celebration
	Zink Magazine, February Issue
	Stílus Magazin (Hungary), March Issue
	AMPM Magazine (Taiwan)
	944 Magazine, May Issue
	Binyan Vediur Magazine (Israel)
2012:	Il Giornale, Italy
	Artfuse
	Artinfo
	Corriere della sera, Italy
