= Patricia Faure =

American art dealer, photographer, and gallery owner

Patricia Faure (April 8, 1928 – October 21, 2008) was an American art dealer, photographer, and gallery owner, based in Los Angeles.

== Early life and education ==
Patricia Enk was born in Milwaukee, Wisconsin, the youngest of three daughters. Her father died when she was very young; Patricia moved to California with her mother and sister in 1943. She attended Hollywood High School, and volunteered at the Modern Institute of Art in Beverly Hills as a teenager. As a young woman she lived in New York City for several years, studying at the New School for Social Research and working as a model for Ford Models.

== Career ==
During her time living in New York, Patricia Enk met and worked with many New York-based artists of the 1950s, including Robert Motherwell, Larry Rivers, Joseph Cornell, Francesco Scavullo. She carried her familiarity with contemporary artists into the Los Angeles scene when she returned in 1955. She became involved with the Ferus Gallery group as a photographer.

From 1959 to 1970 she lived in Paris with her second husband, and worked as a fashion photographer there, most notably capturing the unisex designs of Rudi Gernreich. The couple returned to Los Angeles with their young daughter in 1970, and settled in Santa Monica. She was director of the Nicholas Wilder Gallery in West Hollywood beginning in 1972, and in 1979 she opened the Asher/Faure gallery with Betty Asher. The gallery changed locations before becoming the Patricia Faure gallery at Bergamot Station. Among the notable artists featured at the Asher/Faure or Patricia Faure Gallery were Salomón Huerta, Maxwell Hendler, Mattia biagi, Jacob Hashimoto, Viola Frey, Joel Shapiro, Rona Pondick, Ellen Phelan, Franz Kline, Philip Guston, Robert Yarber, Ronald Davis, Sam Francis, Deborah Butterfield, Katy Stone, Llyn Foulkes, and Robert Zakanitch.

Of her work, Faure often insisted, "You can't sell art. It sells itself. All you can do is keep the place kind of tidy and get the information out. People come in. If they like it, they buy it."

== Personal life ==
Faure married twice. Her first husband was musician Philip Peyton. Her second was Condé Nast art director Jacques Faure, father of her daughter Zazu (b. 1965). Both marriages ended in divorce.

Faure died October 21, 2008, age 80, at the Kingsley Manor retirement community in Hollywood.
