= Katy Stone =

American visual artist born 1969

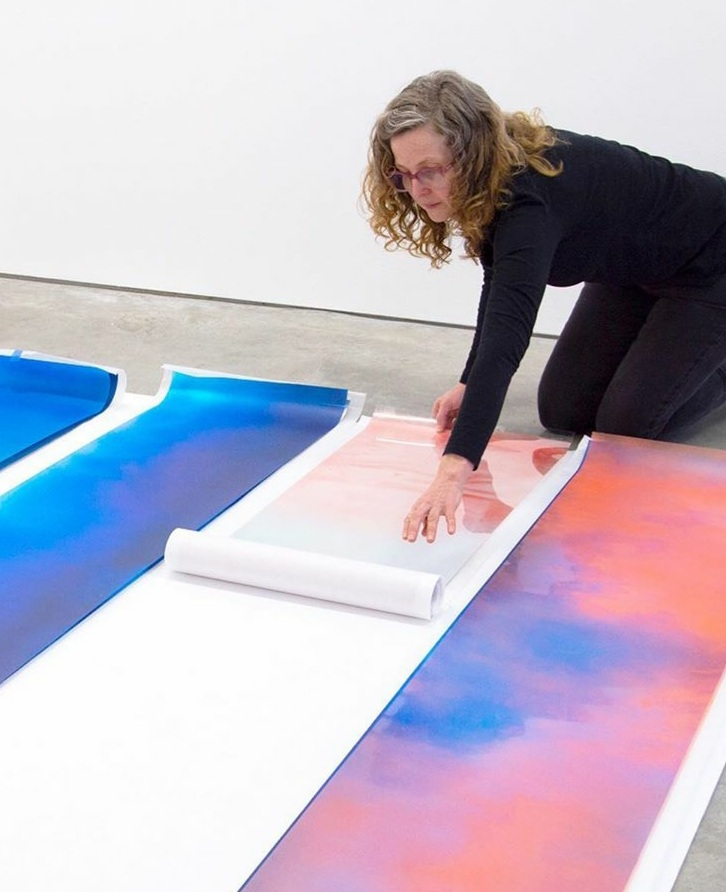
- Born: January 21, 1969 (age 57)
- Education: BFA Iowa State University, 1992 MFA University of Washington, 1994
- Known for: Installation-based visual artworks

Katy Stone (born 1969) is an American visual artist recognized for her installation-based artworks evoking organic forms, patterns, and natural phenomena. Stone's wall-mounted or suspended sculptural constructions, often composed of layers of painted transparent film, paper, or metal, have been exhibited in museums, galleries, and public collections worldwide. Installations by Stone have been commissioned for the University of Michigan's Ross School of Business, Ann Arbor, MI; Microsoft, Redmond, WA; Facebook, Seattle, WA; Cleveland Clinic, Cleveland, OH; Swedish Medical Center, Seattle, WA; Ascent at Roebling's Bridge Covington, KY; the Federal Courthouse, Jackson Mississippi; Barnes-Jewish Hospital, St Louis, MO; Columbia University School of Nursing, New York, NY; Twin Parks, Taichung, Taiwan; and other public institutions and collections. Stone's artworks were exhibited in the U.S. Embassy in Baghdad as part of the US Art in Embassies Program.

In 2014, Stone was commissioned by Sound Transit to create a permanent public artwork for the South Bellevue station on the Link 2 Line in Bellevue, Washington.

== Education ==
Stone received a BFA in Drawing, Painting, and Printmaking, from Iowa State University in 1992, and an MFA in Painting, from the University of Washington, Seattle, WA in 1994.

== Early influences and central themes ==
Since her childhood years in rural Iowa, nature and the landscape have interested Stone whose work reveals her fascination "with natural processes from the cellular to the cosmic." Stone recounts, "growing up in rural Iowa, I developed a connection to the landscape and the particular intensity of feeling that it gave me – feelings that were also produced by the sublime green shag carpet in my childhood bedroom. This notion of revelatory experience through nature, materials and color has always inspired my work." In a 2015 interview with Kimberly Chun for the San Francisco Chronicle, Stone identifies "mysticism, nature, and the power and energy that's under all processes and forms of life" as motivating forces in her work.

Following graduate school Stone's early work focused "almost exclusively on creating site-specific, temporary installations with an ever-expanding repertoire of materials culled from thrift and craft stores that embodied the actions and forms that [Stone] had been painting on paper." Stone's interest in materials that "interact with light or that are physically light, transparent or translucent" led her to experiment with cutting and painting directly on clear plastic overhead transparencies. This was a generative discovery for the artist. Stone explains, "it was like flat paper but clear. I could cut it out with scissors, and when I hung it on a wall, light would go through it, creating a second shadow version of the work." To achieve this desired effect in her installation artworks, Stone frequently paints on archival transparent Dura-Lar film which she pins to the wall or suspends from the ceiling. Stone also paints on aluminum or steel cutouts installed to float on the wall, allowing a shadow to be cast by her forms.

In a review of Stone's 2020 exhibition Light Currents held at the Ryan Lee Gallery, New York, art critic Angela M.H. Schuster describes Stone's process and motivations, "Working primarily in aluminum, Dura-Lar, and dichroic plastic, the artist combines the visual language of organic forms found in nature — seascapes, cloud formations, and celestial bodies — with these industrial materials to create a signature multidimensional hybrid of sculpture and painting. For Stone, "light, time, cosmic forces, and natural phenomena become literal and metaphorical guides" for her artistic meditations.

== Exhibitions ==
Stone's installation artworks were shown in solo exhibitions at the Greg Kucera Gallery, Seattle in 2002, and in 2003 at Suyama Space, Seattle, WA. In 2005 Stone created a site-specific installation for her solo exhibition at The Boise Art Museum. In 2006 Stone designed a sculptural installation forming "gentle colored rains, spattering down and around her cascades of transparent sheets" which was exhibited at the Patricia Faure Gallery in Los Angeles alongside paintings by Llyn Foulkes. In 2008 Stone's solo exhibition A Season Swirling (Unfurling) took place at the Missoula Art Museum, Missoula, MT. Stone lived in Montana from 1996-2001 and the central theme of her Missoula exhibition was "based on the Montana landscape and the artist's impressions and memories of the rhythm of its seasons." In 2013 Stone's artwork Lunar Drift (2011) was included in the exhibition Flow just Flow, held at the Harnett Museum of Art, University of Richmond. In 2019 Stone's solo exhibition Once Upon A Time was organized by the Kansas City Art Institute. In 2020 Stone's solo exhibition Light Currents was held at the Ryan Lee Gallery, New York.

== Public art commissions ==
In 2011 Stone's artwork Horizon (2011), was commissioned by the General Services Administration's Art in Architecture Program for the Jackson Federal Courthouse, Jackson, MS. Also in 2011, Stone's 14' x 13' x 3" acrylic on aluminum sculpture Life Sign, (2011) was commissioned by the Lake Washington Institute of Technology, Kirkland, WA. Stone notes that the artwork "expresses the idea of life at both the microscopic and macroscopic level, and symbolizes the concept of interconnectedness." Stone's artwork was acquired for the Washington State Art Collection in partnership with Lake Washington Technical College.

In 2014, Stone was commissioned to create site-specific permanent installations for Seattle City Light's Tech Training Center and South Bellevue light rail station in Bellevue, Washington. Her South Bellevue artwork, titled Slough Wave, was completed in 2022 and spans the roofline and facade of the station's parking garage. The installation was inspired by the nearby Mercer Slough.

Stone's Columbia Ray (2017) was commissioned by the Columbia University School of Nursing. Stretching to 41 feet, Stone's "sculptural relief installation is made of 1,200 individual pieces of hand-painted laser-cut acrylic in vibrant shades of yellow, attached to the wall with custom standoff hardware that makes each piece appear to be floating." "The work suggests a ray of light, a striking formal addition to the space, and a metaphor for the trajectory and reach of education," said Stone. "That art can be a tool for healing, a portal to another mental state, is important to my work. And it seems magnified in a setting that is about life and health," said Stone. Stone's artworks have also been commissioned by the Barnes Jewish Hospital, Cleveland Clinic, and Michigan State University School of Nursing.

In 2017, Stone's artwork Cascadia was commissioned by Facebook while Stone was an Art in Residence at Facebook's Headquarters in Seattle Washington.

== Personal life ==
Stone was born on January 21, 1969, in Rockford, Illinois. Stone lives and works in Seattle, Washington.
