= Redmond Technology station =

Light rail station in Redmond, Washington

63 Redmond Technology
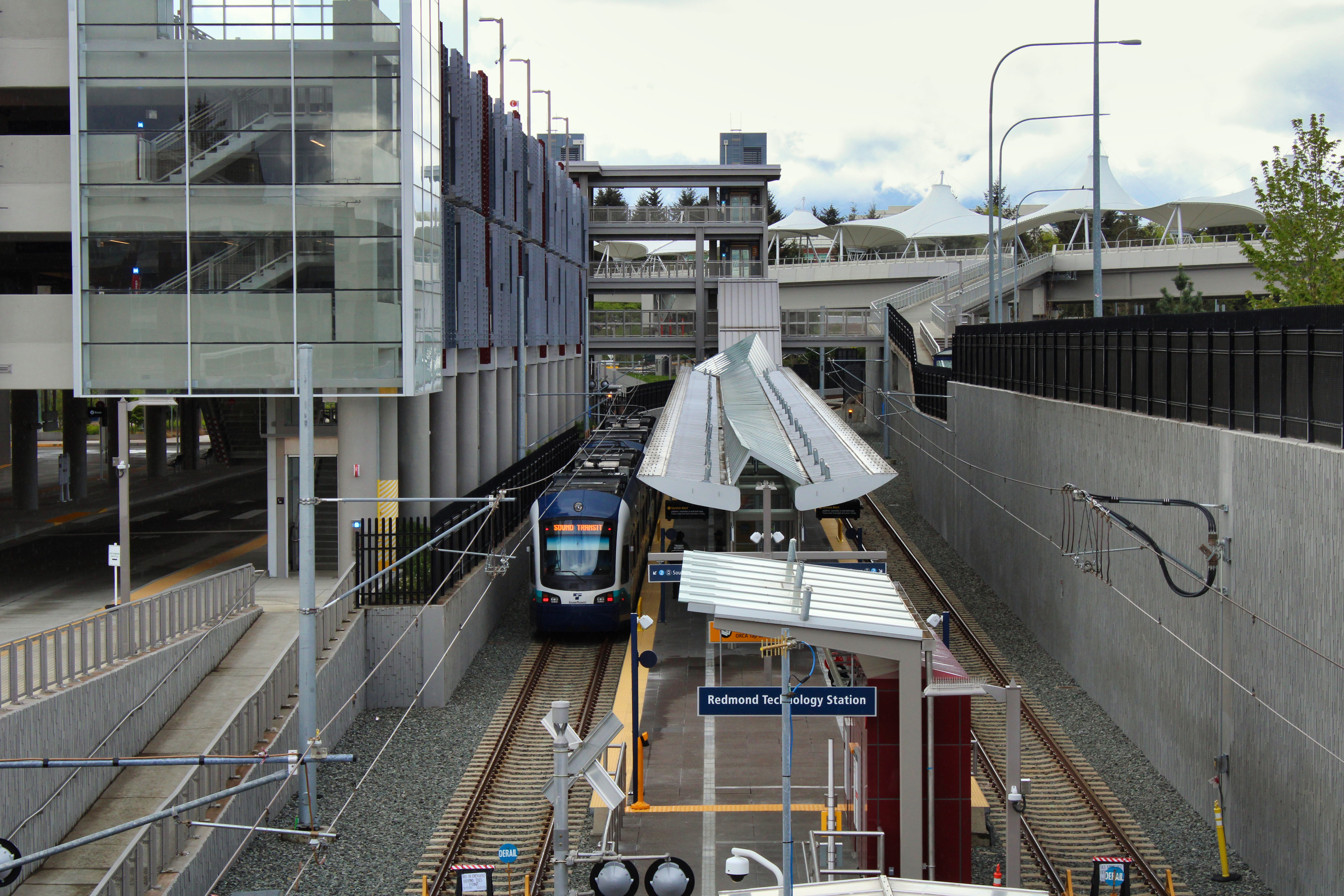
- View of the light rail station from an overpass on NE 40th St.

General information
- Location: 3929 156th Avenue Northeast; Redmond, Washington; United States
- Coordinates: 47°38′41″N 122°08′01″W
- Owner: Sound Transit
- Platforms: 1 island platform
- Tracks: 2
- Train operators: Sound Transit
- Bus stands: 6
- Bus operators: King County Metro (RapidRide); Sound Transit Express

Construction
- Structure type: At-grade
- Parking: 222 spaces
- Cycle facilities: Lockers and racks
- Accessible: Yes

History
- Opened: 4 February 2002 (bus station); April 27, 2024 (rail station)
- Rebuilt: 2017–2024
- Former names: Overlake Transit Center (2002–2017)

Passengers
- 898 daily weekday boardings (2025); 282,401 total boardings (2025)

Services
Preceding station	Sound Transit	Following station
Link
Overlake Village toward Lynnwood City Center	2 Line	Marymoor Village toward Downtown Redmond
Location

Redmond Technology station, formerly Overlake Transit Center, is a light rail and bus station in Redmond, Washington, United States. It is adjacent to State Route 520 on the headquarters campus of Microsoft. The station is served by the 2 Line, part of Sound Transit's Link light rail system, and several King County Metro and Sound Transit Express routes. The bus station originally opened in 2002 and was replaced by a new facility that was constructed along the light rail line, which opened on April 27, 2024. Redmond Technology served as the terminus of the 2 Line until an extension to Downtown Redmond station opened in 2025.

== Location ==
The light rail station is located adjacent to State Route 520 near its interchange with NE 40th Street.

A pedestrian bridge over State Route 520, connecting the station to the Microsoft west campus, was funded by Microsoft and the City of Redmond in 2013 and began construction in 2020. It opened in April 2024 after the completion of approach ramps and was transferred to the city government for maintenance. The bridge is 1,100 feet (340 m) long and uses a series of fabric canopies to form a continuous roof.

== History ==
Overlake Transit Center opened on February 4, 2002, and cost $8 million to construct with funds from Sound Transit, the City of Redmond, King County Metro, Microsoft, and the Federal Transit Administration, opened on February 4, 2002. The new transit center initially lacked passenger shelters and a paved parking lot, which were added in May. The 10-acre (4.0 ha) site was donated by Microsoft, who also contributed $1.2 million to the project and added commuter bus and shuttle bus services. Microsoft's involvement was part of a development agreement with the City of Redmond for its campus expansion project. The transit center had eight bus bays.

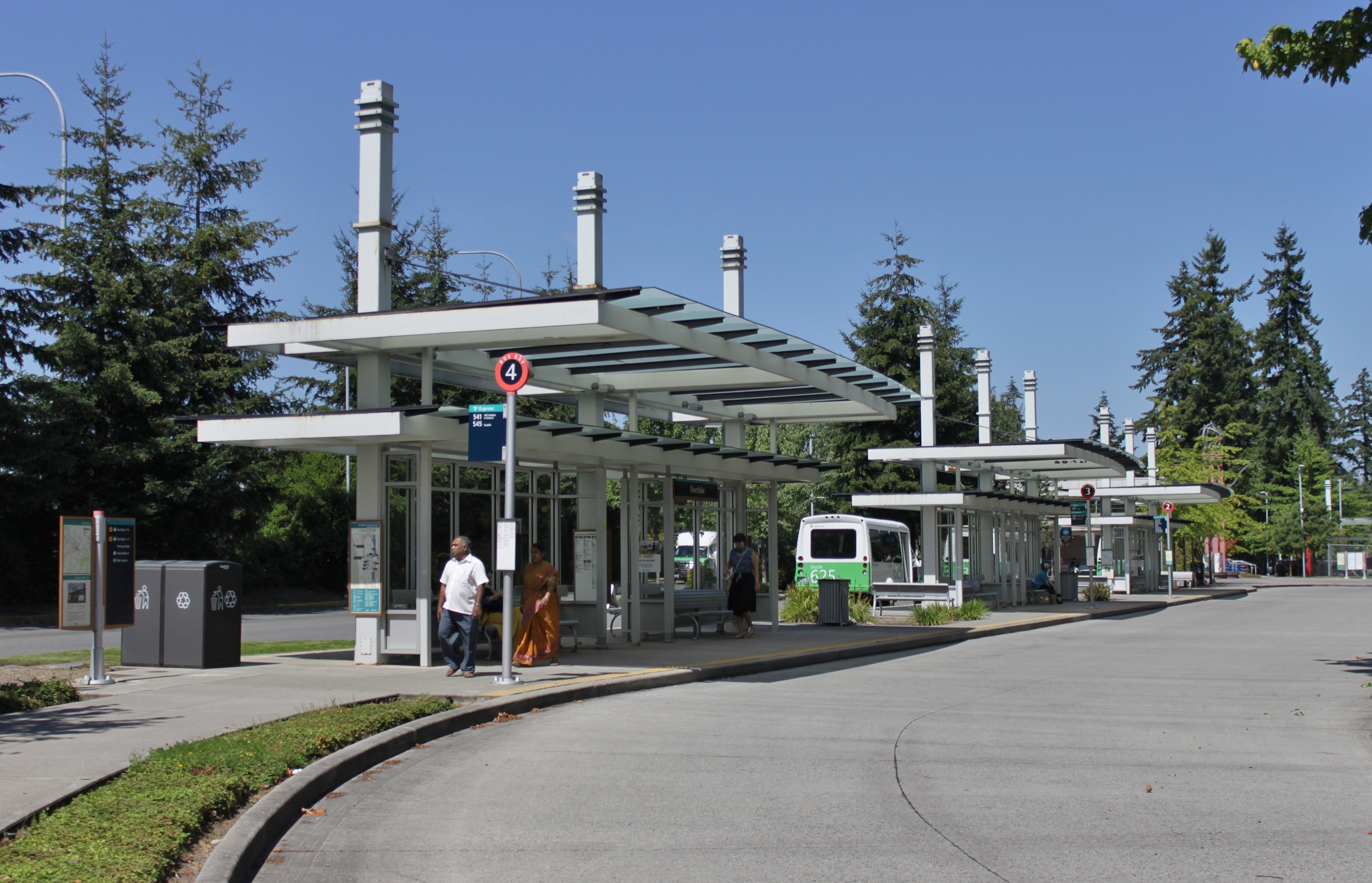
The bus bays at the old Overlake Transit Center before it was demolished

The park and ride closed in May 2017, as part of preparations for light rail construction. In late July, Sound Transit shifted bus service to a series of temporary bus bays near NE 36th Street and began demolition of the old transit center. The new light rail station's name was shortened from Redmond Technology Center to Redmond Technology in March 2018 in response to a request from Redmond and Microsoft.

The new bus bays at the station were opened in December 2019 under the partially completed parking garage. During construction of the parking garage, cracks were discovered in the concrete above the bus exit. The bus stops and pedestrian walkways were temporarily moved from the garage in April 2020 while an investigation was conducted. The southeast corner of the garage, where several structural deficiencies were found, was demolished in 2021. The bus loop reopened for Microsoft buses in August 2023 and was followed a month later by Sound Transit Express and King County Metro buses. The garage was reopened for parking on October 31.

Light rail service from the station began on April 27, 2024, with trains operating between South Bellevue and Redmond Technology as part of the 2 Line's starter segment. Service was extended further east to Downtown Redmond on May 10, 2025.
