= KPD (disambiguation) =

The Communist Party of Germany (KPD) was a political party in Weimar Germany.

KPD or kpd can also refer to:

== Organizations ==
- Communist Party of Germany (1990), successor to the Weimar Germany political party
- Department of Cultural Heritage, department of the Lithuanian Ministry of Culture
- Kent Police Department, police department of Kent, Washington, U.S.
- KPD (publisher), Estonian publishing house
- Kuban Partisan Movement, movement in Russia
- Royal Malaysian Police Cooperative Limited, Malaysian financial conglomerate

== Science ==
- Kapundaite, mineral species
- Ketosis-prone diabetes, medical condition
- Kidney paired donation, approach to kidney transplantation

== Other uses ==
- Katpadi Junction railway station, near Vellore, Tamil Nadu, India
- Koba language, Austronesian language spoken in Indonesia
