= Bellevue murders =

1997 mass murder in Bellevue, Washington

Bellevue Massacre
- Location: 47.5932°N 122.1740°W; Bellevue, Washington, U.S.
- Date: January 3–4, 1997
- Attack type: Mass murder, family annihilation
- Weapons: Baseball bat, knife, strangulation
- Deaths: 4
- Perpetrators: Alex Baranyi and David Anderson

The Bellevue murders, also known as the Bellevue massacre, occurred on the night of January 3, and the early morning of January 4, 1997. Alex Kevin Baranyi and David Carpenter Anderson, both 17 years old, lured Kimberly Ann Wilson, 20, to a park in Bellevue, Washington, United States, and murdered her. Afterwards, they entered her family home and murdered her father Bill Wilson, his wife, Rose Wilson, and their other daughter, Julia Wilson. Both Baranyi and Anderson were convicted and sentenced to serve four consecutive life sentences without the possibility of parole, which have both since been reduced since they were under 18 at the time.

The motives behind the murders remain unclear, but both perpetrators exhibited signs of psychological disturbance during questioning. When Baranyi was asked about his motives, he calmly replied that he wanted to kill someone because he was "in a rut." Testimonies from Baranyi and Anderson led investigators to suggest that they killed the Wilson family for the experience of killing.

== Discovery ==
On January 4, 1997, while playing in a park in the Seattle suburb of Bellevue, two young boys spotted what they believed to be a pile of clothes in the bushes. Upon their return to the park the next day, they realized that what they had seen the previous day was a human body. They ran home, and one of their mothers reported the finding to the Bellevue Police Department. Bellevue detectives responded to the scene and found the body of a young woman who was later identified as 20-year-old Kimberly Wilson. She appeared to have been involved in a struggle and to have died by strangulation; a cord was found wrapped around her neck.

When detectives arrived at the Wilson residence, interior lights were off, although three cars were parked outside and Christmas lights were still on. Detective Jeff Gomes found that a sliding glass door was open. He called out to see if anyone inside would respond. When Gomes heard nothing, he drew his gun and stepped inside the house. Gomes crept upstairs to check if the family was asleep. He discovered blood-splattered walls and ceilings. Gomes found the body of Rose Wilson (Kim's mother), in bed in the master bedroom. She had been stabbed multiple times in the throat, and her head had been crushed by numerous blows from a heavy object. Near the foot of the bed, Gomes found the body of Kim's father, William "Bill" Wilson, who had similar injuries. The body of Kim's 17-year-old sister, Julia, was then discovered in the hall; she appeared to have struggled against her attacker. One of her arms had been broken, and both her head and neck had been stabbed multiple times.

== Investigation ==
Bellevue Police and detectives quickly began interviewing neighbors regarding any suspicious activity or noises and for information on any potential enemies of the Wilsons. Co-workers of William said that he was well-liked, with his boss describing him as "very loyal and a good employee." Co-workers of Rose said that she was "friendly and outgoing". Classmates of Julia, a senior at Bellevue High School, described her as "a sweet, shy young girl."

Kim had graduated from the same high school that Julia was attending. The high school counselor at Bellevue stated that there was tension between Kim and her parents during her last years in high school. Records show that a year prior to the Wilsons' deaths in 1996, one of their neighbors had placed a domestic disturbance call reporting an argument between Kim and her parents. When detectives began interviewing Kim's friends, they discovered Kim was friends with a goth group that hung out late at night at the local Denny's, although Kim did not spend time there herself. Calling themselves "The Saturday Night Denny's Club", the friends discussed role-playing games with themes of eroticism and death. Several members of the group spoke of the club as being a fun way to rebel against moralism and establish their own identities, however, none of them admitted to having ever considered committing murder. Members told detectives that two of the group, Baranyi and Anderson, spoke about committing murder on a weekly basis.

Investigators questioned and interviewed both Baranyi and Anderson at their residences. Both claimed to have been playing video games at Baranyi's home on the night of the murders. Police examined the boys' shoes to compare them with a distinctive shoe tread pattern discovered at the crime scene. Baranyi showed the detectives some brown work shoes, claiming they were his only pair. Witnesses and Baranyi's neighbors disputed the claims that both boys had played video games all night at Baranyi's house. A close friend of Baranyi told authorities that Baranyi had boots with a similar tread pattern to the ones found at the crime scene. Searching the Wilson household again, detectives discovered two different kinds of bloody footprints, indicating that at least two individuals committed the murders.

== Confession and sentencing ==
Five days after first speaking with detectives, Baranyi admitted to them that he and his accomplice had murdered the Wilsons. He told authorities that he killed Kim first, strangling her at the park. After Baranyi realized that Kim might have told her parents where she was going to meet him that night, he decided to kill them as well. Baranyi went into the Wilson house with a baseball bat and a combat knife. He began to beat Rose Wilson with the bat, awakening her sleeping husband Bill Wilson. When Bill came to his wife's defense, Baranyi beat and stabbed him to death. He then stabbed Rose with the knife and went upstairs to kill her daughter, Julia. Before returning to his home, Baranyi took a telephone, a CD player, and a VCR from the Wilson house.

Baranyi refused to name his accomplice to the detectives, later discovered to be a boy named David Anderson. Following further investigations, David Anderson was brought in for another round of questioning. This time, Anderson claimed that he had lied to detectives when he told them that he had been with Baranyi the night of the murders. He claimed that, on the night of the murders, he had been driving a truck belonging to his girlfriend's father between the cities of Bellevue and Seattle. Anderson also claimed he knew Baranyi had been planning the Wilsons' murders for a while. He cited the friendship between himself and Kim Wilson as Baranyi's only connection to Kim. Three people who lived near the Baranyi residence contradicted Anderson's statement; they claimed that they saw the two boys leaving the house together at the same time on the night of the murders. Detectives searched the households of both boys and took items Baranyi had stolen, in addition to bloody shoes matching the shoe tread pattern at the crime scene. DNA tests on these items traced back to the Wilsons.

Baranyi and Anderson were charged with murder in the first degree. Prosecutors attempted to try them together when the trial began in October 1998, but the court felt that each needed a separate trial for his individual role in the crimes. Three weeks after the trial began, Baranyi was sentenced to four consecutive life terms without the possibility of parole. When asked if he had anything to say, Baranyi replied, "No, I don't think so." He began serving his sentence a week later. Anderson hired and fired numerous lawyers in order to escape a sentencing similar to that of Baranyi. However, a month and a half later, Anderson was also sentenced to four consecutive life terms without the possibility of parole. Since that time, the state declared "juveniles sentenced to life without being eligible for parole" had to be reviewed for a chance of parole.

In March 2022, Anderson was resentenced to life with the possibility of parole after 33 years. In October 2024, Baranyi was resentenced to life with the possibility of parole after 46 years.

== Popular culture ==
- The murders were dramatized in Killer Kids.
