= List of law enforcement agencies in Washington (state) =

This is a list of law enforcement agencies in the US state of Washington.

According to the US Bureau of Justice Statistics' 2008 Census of State and Local Law Enforcement Agencies, the state had 260 law enforcement agencies employing 11,411 sworn police officers, about 174 for each 100,000 residents. The state has the lowest ratio of police officers to residents of any state, compared to a national average of 251 per 100,000 residents.

== State agencies ==
- Washington State Attorney General's Office
- Washington State Department of Corrections
- Washington State Department of Fish and Wildlife
- Washington State Department of Labor and Industries
- Washington State Department of Natural Resources
- Washington State Gambling Commission
- Washington State Liquor and Cannabis Board
- Washington State Parks
- Washington State Patrol

== County agencies ==
- Adams County Sheriff's Office
- Asotin County Sheriff's Office
- Benton County Sheriff's Office
- Chelan County Sheriff's Office
- Clallam County Sheriff's Office
- Clark County Sheriff's Office
- Columbia County Sheriff's Office
- Cowlitz County Sheriff's Office
- Douglas County Sheriff's Office
- Ferry County Sheriff's Office
- Franklin County Sheriff's Office
- Garfield County Sheriff's Office
- Grant County Sheriff's Office
- Grays Harbor County Sheriff's Office
- Island County Sheriff's Office
- Jefferson County Sheriff's Office
- King County Sheriff's Office
- Kitsap County Sheriff's Office
- Kittitas County Sheriff's Office
- Klickitat County Sheriff's Office
- Lewis County Sheriff's Office
- Lincoln County Sheriff's Office
- Mason County Sheriff's Office
- Okanogan County Sheriff's Office
- Pacific County Sheriff's Office
- Pend Oreille County Sheriff's Office
- Pierce County Sheriff's Department
- San Juan County Sheriff's Office
- Skagit County Sheriff's Office
- Skamania County Sheriff's Office
- Snohomish County Sheriff's Office
- Spokane County Sheriff's Office
- Stevens County Sheriff's Office
- Thurston County Sheriff's Office
- Wahkiakum County Sheriff's Office
- Walla Walla County Sheriff's Office
- Whatcom County Sheriff's Office
- Whitman County Sheriff's Office
- Yakima County Sheriff's Office

== Local agencies ==
- Aberdeen Police Department
- Airway Heights Police Department
- Algona Police Department
- Anacortes Police Department
- Arlington Police Department
- Auburn Police Department
- Bainbridge Island Police Department
- Battle Ground Police Department
- Bellevue Police Department
- Bellingham Police Department
- Bingen-White Salmon Police Department
- Black Diamond Police Department
- Blaine Police Department
- Bonney Lake Police Department
- Bothell police Department
- Bremerton Police Department
- Brewster Police Department
- Brier Police Department
- Buckley Police Department
- Burlington Police Department
- Camas Police Department
- Castle Rock Police Department
- Centralia Police Department
- Chehalis Police Department
- Chelan Police Department
- Cheney Police Department
- Chewelah Police Department
- Cle Elum/Roslyn Police Department
- Clarkston Police Department
- Clyde Hill Police Department
- Colfax Police Department
- College Place Police Department
- Colville Police Department
- Connell Police Department
- Coulee City Police Department
- Coulee Dam Police Department
- Centralia Police Department
- Cosmopolis Police Department
- Coupeville Marshal's Office
- Des Moines Police Department
- DuPont Police Department
- Duvall Police Department
- East Wenatchee Police Department
- Eatonville Police Department
- Edmonds Police Department
- Ellensburg Police Department
- Elma Police Department
- Enumclaw Police Department
- Ephrata Police Department
- Everett Police Department
- Everson Police Department
- Federal Way Police Department
- Ferndale Police Department
- Fife Police Department
- Fircrest Police Department
- Forks Police Department
- Gig Harbor Police Department
- Goldendale Police Department
- Grand Coulee Police Department
- Granite Falls Police Department
- Grandview Police Department
- Granger Police Department
- Hoquiam Police Department
- Issaquah Police Department
- Kalama Police Department
- Kelso Police Department
- Kennewick Police Department
- Kent Police Department
- Kettle Falls Police Department
- Kirkland Police Department
- Kittitas Police Department
- La Center Police Department
- Lake Forest Park Police Department
- Lake Stevens Police Department
- Lakewood Police Department
- Lacey Police Department
- Langley Police Department
- Liberty Lake Police Department
- Long Beach Police Department
- Longview Police Department
- Lynden Police Department
- Lynnwood Police Department
- Mabton Police Department
- Mattawa Police Department
- Marysville Police Department
- McCleary Police Department
- Medical Lake Police Department
- Medina Police Department
- Mercer Island Police Department
- Mill Creek Police Department
- Milton Police Department
- Monroe Police Department
- Montesano Police Department
- Morton Police Department
- Moses Lake Police Department
- Mossyrock Police Department
- Mount Vernon Police Department
- Mountlake Terrace Police Department
- Moxee Police Department
- Mukilteo Police Department
- Napavine Police Department
- Newcastle Police Department
- Newport Police Department
- Normandy Park Police Department
- North Bonneville Police Department
- Moses Lake Police Department
- Oak Harbor Police Department
- Oakesdale Marshal's Office
- Ocean Shores Police Department
- Odessa Town Marshal's Office
- Olympia Police Department
- Omak Police Department
- Oroville Police Department
- Orting Police Department
- Othello Police Department
- Pacific Police Department
- Palouse Police Department
- Pasco Police Department
- Port Angeles Police Department
- Port of Seattle Police Department
- Port Orchard Police Department
- Port Townsend Police Department
- Poulsbo Police Department
- Prosser Police Department
- Pullman Police Department
- Puyallup Police Department
- Quincy Police Department
- Rainier Police Department
- Raymond Police Department
- Redmond Police Department
- Republic Police Department
- Renton Police Department
- Richland Police Department
- Ridgefield Police Department
- Ritzville Police Department
- Roy Police Department
- Royal City Police Department
- Ruston Police Department
- Seattle Police Department
- Selah Police Department
- Sedro-Woolley Police Department
- Sequim Police Department
- Shelton Police Department
- Shoreline Police Department
- Snohomish Police Department
- Snoqualmie Police Department
- Soap Lake Police Department
- South Bend Police Department
- Spokane Police Department
- Stanwood Police Department
- Steilacoom Public Safety Department
- Sultan Police Department
- Sumas Police Department
- Sumner Police Department
- Sunnyside Police Department
- Tacoma Police Department
- Tenino Police Department
- Tieton Police Department
- Toledo Police Department
- Tonasket Police Department
- Toppenish Police Department
- Tukwila Police Department
- Tumwater Police Department
- Twisp Police Department
- Union Gap Police Department
- Uniontown Police Department
- Vancouver Police Department
- Walla Walla Police Department
- Wapato Police Department
- Warden Police Department
- Washougal Police Department
- Wenatchee Police Department
- West Richland Police Department
- Westport Police Department
- Wilbur Police Department
- Winlock Police Department
- Winthrop Marshal’s Office
- Woodland Police Department
- Yakima Police Department
- Yelm Police Department
- Zillah Police Department

== College and university agencies ==
- Central Washington University Public Safety and Police Services
- Eastern Washington University Police
- Evergreen State College Police
- University of Washington Police Department
- Washington State University Police
- Western Washington University Police

== Tribal agencies ==
- Chehalis Tribal Police
- Colville Tribal Police
- Cowlitz Tribal Police
- Lower Elwha Tribal Police
- Hoh Tribal Police
- Kalispel Tribal Police
- Lummi Tribal Police
- Nisqually Tribal Police
- Nooksack Police Department
- Port Gamble Sk'lallam Tribal Police
- Puyallup Tribal Police
- Quileute Tribal Police
- Quinault Tribal Police
- Sauk-Suiattle Tribal Police
- Shoalwater Bay Tribal Police
- Skokomish Tribal Police
- Spokane Tribal Police
- Squaxin Island Tribal Police
- Stillaguamish Police Department
- Suquamish Tribal Police
- Swinomish Tribal Police
- Tulalip Tribal Police
- Upper Skagit Tribal Police
- Yakama Tribal Police
