= PAX (event) =

Series of gaming culture festivals

- Status: Active
- Genre: Gaming (video game, tabletop, CCG, role-playing)
- Venue: Various: Current; PAX West: Seattle Convention Center; PAX East: Thomas Michael Menino Convention and Exhibition Center; PAX Aus: Melbourne Convention and Exhibition Centre; PAX Unplugged (Philadelphia): Pennsylvania Convention Center; PAX Unplugged (Houston): George R. Brown Convention Center; Former; PAX South: Henry B. González Convention Center; PAX East: Hynes Convention Center; PAX Aus: Melbourne Showgrounds; PAX West: Meydenbauer Center
- Locations: Various: Current; PAX West: Seattle; PAX East: Boston; PAX Aus: Melbourne; PAX Unplugged: Philadelphia; Houston; Former; PAX South: San Antonio
- Country: United States; Australia
- Inaugurated: PAX West: August 28–29, 2004 Other PAX(s): PAX East: March 26–28, 2010; PAX Dev: August 24–25, 2011; PAX Aus: July 19–21, 2013; PAX South: January 23–25, 2015; PAX Unplugged (Philadelphia): November 17–19, 2017; PAX Unplugged (Houston): June 25–27, 2027 (scheduled)
- Most recent: PAX Aus: October 9–11, 2026 Other PAX(s): PAX West: September 4–7, 2026; PAX East: March 26–29, 2026; PAX Unplugged (Philadelphia): November 21–23, 2025; PAX South: January 17–19, 2020; PAX Dev: August 27–28, 2019
- Next event: PAX Unplugged (Philadelphia): December 4–6, 2026 Other PAX(s): PAX East: April 22–25, 2027; PAX Unplugged (Houston): June 25–27, 2027; PAX West: September 3–6, 2027; PAX Aus: October 8–10, 2027
- Organizer: Penny Arcade; RELX
- Website: www.paxsite.com

PAX (originally known as Penny Arcade Expo) is a series of gaming culture festivals involving tabletop, arcade, and video gaming. PAX is held annually in Seattle, Boston, Philadelphia, and Melbourne. Previously, it was also held in San Antonio.

PAX was created in 2004 by Jerry Holkins and Mike Krahulik, the authors of the Penny Arcade webcomic, because they wanted to attend a show exclusively for gaming. The shows include speeches from industry insiders, game-culture inspired concerts, panels on game topics, exhibitor booths from both independent and major game developers and publishers, LAN party multiplayer setups, tabletop gaming tournaments, and video game freeplay areas.

== History ==
The first Penny Arcade Expo was held on August 28–29, 2004, at the Meydenbauer Center, and was attended by about 3,300 people. Renamed PAX, it became an annual event. Attendance grew rapidly, topping 9,000 in 2005 and 19,000 in 2006.

Outgrowing the Meydenbauer Center, the event moved to the Washington State Convention and Trade Center, where it drew some 39,000 in 2007; 58,500 in 2008; 60,750 in 2009; and 70,000 in 2011. The show stopped reporting attendance numbers in 2011, citing difficulties in tracking attendance in a multi-day event.

In 2009, Penny Arcade partnered with ReedPOP.

PAX Prime 2013, the first four-day PAX, was held on August 30 – September 2, 2013; passes sold out in six hours.

=== Expansion to more cities ===
In 2010, the first PAX East was held at the Hynes Convention Center on March 26–28, 2010, drawing 52,290 attendees. The first PAX Prime drew 67,600 attendees in 2010. PAX East moved to Boston Convention and Exhibition Center in 2011; a 2012 agreement cemented Boston as the home of PAX East until 2023.

The first international event was PAX Australia, first held July 19–21, 2013 at the Melbourne Showgrounds. The following year, it moved to the Melbourne Convention and Exhibition Centre, where it remains.

The first PAX South was held in San Antonio, Texas, at the Henry B. Gonzalez Convention Center on January 23–25, 2015. It set a PAX record for highest attendance for an inaugural year. But the event saw little growth in later years, and was cancelled in October 2021.

=== Specialty events ===
From 2011 until 2020, Penny Arcade held PAX Dev, an annual event meant to allow the game developer community to "speak freely and focus entirely on their trade". Unlike other game-developer events like GDC, PAX Dev did not allow press. 750 people attended in 2011.

At PAX South 2017, Penny Arcade and ReedPop announced that a new event type, PAX Unplugged, would be held on November 17–19, 2017, at the Pennsylvania Convention Center. The event focused on tabletop games, a type that was only incidental in other PAXes.

During PAX West 2026, a return to Texas was announced with a second iteration of PAX Unplugged to be held in Houston at the George R. Brown Convention Center on June 25–27, 2027.

=== Name of PAX in Seattle ===
PAX was originally known as the "Penny Arcade Expo", but quickly became known by its acronym "PAX". Seattle's PAX was renamed PAX Prime in 2010 and PAX West in 2015.

== Activities ==
PAX consists of the following activities:

- Freeplay, further broken into: Console, Classic Console, Handheld, PC, VR, and Tabletop.
- Tournaments, further broken into: Console and Tabletop. Some PAXes feature additional tournaments hosted by vendors.
- "Bring Your Own Computer" or BYOC, a LAN Party.
- Panels, talks, signings, and similar events.
- Concerts.
- PAX Arena, an eSports tournament.
- The Omegathon.
- An Exhibition Hall, which includes game studios, merchandise, and the Indie Megabooth.

=== The Omegathon ===
Each PAX features an event called the "Omegathon", a festival-long tournament consisting of a group of randomly selected attendees competing in a game bracket for a grand prize (which has varied from a large game bundle, to a trip to Japan, to a trip to any PAX in the world). The final round of the Omegathon makes up part of the closing ceremonies of PAX. Past games for the final round of the Omegathon have included Tetris, Pong, Halo 3, and skee-ball.

== Events ==
=== Active events ===
PAX West (formerly Penny Arcade Expo, PAX, and PAX Prime) has been held annually in Seattle, Washington, United States, since 2007 (formerly in Bellevue, Washington from 2004 to 2006).

PAX East has been held annually in Boston, Massachusetts, United States, since 2010.

PAX Aus has been held annually in Melbourne, Victoria, Australia, since 2013.

PAX Unplugged has been held annually in Philadelphia, Pennsylvania, United States, since 2017.

PAX Unplugged Houston will be held in Houston, Texas from 2027.

=== Former events ===
PAX South was held annually in San Antonio, Texas, United States, from 2015 to 2020.

PAX Dev was held annually in Seattle, Washington, United States, from 2011 to 2019.

PAX Online was held virtually in 2020 and 2021, during the COVID-19 pandemic.

=== Timeline ===
PAX
PAX Prime
PAX West
PAX West
PAX East
PAX East
PAX Dev
PAX Aus
PAX Aus
PAX South
PAX Unplugged
PAX Unplugged Philadelphia
PAX Online
PAX Unplugged Houston →
│
04
│
05
│
06
│
07
│
08
│
09
│
10
│
11
│
12
│
13
│
14
│
15
│
16
│
17
│
18
│
19
│
20
│
21
│
22
│
23
│
24
│
25
│
26
│
27
│
Timeline of PAX events, 2004–2027

== See also ==
- DreamHack
- E3
- ChinaJoy
