= SamaWorld =

Abandoned theme park in Malaysia

- Interactive map of SamaWorld
- Location: SamaWorld Theme Resort, Genting Highlands, Malaysia
- Coordinates: 3.42869°N 101.79441°E
- Opened: Never opened
- Operated by: SamaWorld Theme Park Sdn. Bhd.
- Theme: See the World in a Day
- Slogan: Fantasy & Fun For Everyone

The SamaWorld Theme Park and Destination Resort is an abandoned theme park development in Genting Highlands, Pahang, Malaysia. Planning began in the 1980s and construction started in the 1990s but the project was never completed.

== Location ==
The abandoned SamaWorld site is located on a mountain slope between the Genting Highlands Resort and the Ion Delemen high-rise complex. It lies beneath the road leading to Amber Court and Ion Delemen. The road is now called Jalan Ion Delemen.

== History ==
With Asia's economic boom in the 1980s, income levels and demand for leisure activity increased. This led to the construction of many amusement parks in Asia. Two Malaysian entrepreneurs, Lim Tuck Fatt and Lim Tuck Sing proposed the SamaWorld theme park for the Genting Highlands. The second son of the Sultan of Selangor, Tengku Sulaiman Shah, was chairman of SamaWorld (Malaysia) Sdn Bhd and Lim Tuck Fatt was managing director. SamaWorld (Malaysia) was a subsidiary of SamaWorld Asia Sdn Bhd. 70% of the Sama World Asia consortium was held by the Lim Brothers together with Tengku Sulaiman Shah and the remaining 30% were held by the Malaysian Government (Selangor State Development Corporation). Later Kuala Lumpur International Sdn Bhd, a subsidiary of the Police Cooperative, invested in SamaWorld. There would've been a special tax relief for the first years of operation. The office of SamaWorld (Malaysia) was in the Wisma Sama building in Petaling Jaya.

The Sama Holdings Group with foreign investors, consultants and contractors from the US, Australia, Taiwan, Japan, West Germany, France (Buoygues), and Canada planned to undertake the project. The Sama Group was a conglomerate of diverse companies in trading (Sama Corporation, later renamed SamaWorld Management), manufacturing (Sama Plastic Industries), properties (Sama Land Development), and more. Sama was owned by Samanda (WTK Holdings) and later Sakullah Holdings, a company founded by Lim Tuck Fatt and S. Kulasegaran.

The SamaWorld project comprised a Disney-like theme park, a hotel, residential and commercial developments, a health spa, a clubhouse, and a special events area with live shows (3,500-seat amphitheater/Entertainment Complex). The estimated cost was around 1 billion Malaysian dollars including land clearing and initial infrastructure development cost around 540 million dollar and the theme park development around 600 million dollar. Financing was 35 % from equity and 65 % from borrowing. Initial assistance was by Shearson Lehman Malaysia and Rakyat Merchant Bankers Bhd. Shearson Lehman Brothers was the financial adviser for SamaWorld. A deal with the Canadian mining company Giant Bay Resources Ltd. was arranged and Giant Bay developed the residential and commercial part around SamaWorld.

The total area of the SamaWorld project was 140 hectares with 39 hectares occupied by the theme park. In 1987, the land was purchased from Genting Bhd. Planning and construction was difficult because of the dense jungle terrain on a 5,500-foot-high mountain sloping 20 to 30 degrees. Land clearing and construction of the park started in 1990. The work had heavy civil engineering components with hand-dug caisson piles, slope stabilizations, drainage and sub soil drainage excavations, access road works and bulk earth works with construction of the highest reinforced earth walls and retaining structures at the time in Malaysia. The construction of a preview center on the site was financed by a fast food chain (believed to be KFC). The park was first scheduled to open in 1990, then 1993, and later in 1995. The mountainous terrain and heavy monsoons led to a stop of the work. The expected opening was delayed until 1996 whereby the size of the park was scaled down to 12 hectares. Khong Guan (a biscuit manufacturer) bought 69% of SamaWorld and the completion date was set to 1998. With the consequences of the Asian financial crisis 1997 the project was abandoned. In 2003 an official receiver was appointed to take over the management of SamaWorld (Malaysia).

=== Name and marketing ===
According to the magazine Variety, sama means "happy" in Malay. The SamaWorld logo was a squirrel next to a globe with a banner reading "SamaWorld" and the slogan "Fantasy & Fun For Everyone". The project was announced in the New Straits Times with the phrase "A Small Step Taken By Us, A Giant Stride for Malaysians and the Nation." Selangor State Development urged SamaWorld to carry out "aggressive publicity campaigns" internationally. Malaysian Airlines did not buy stake in the project but wanted to promoted it as a tourist spot. Advertising focused on the unique location 5,000 ft above sea level in a cool environment. SamaWorld described itself as South East Asias first international theme park. On site promotion was with a preview centre showcasing the whole theme park in replica. Te preview centre was financed by KFC for the right to have premises in the park.

=== Relationship with the Genting Group ===
In 1987 Genting BHD signed a sales and purchase agreement with Sama Holdings to sell 140 hectares of freehold land at Genting Highlands to SamaWorld. Lim Kok Thay said that the development of a Disney-like Themepark would augur well for Genting's business. The stockbroker TA Securities assessed that the SamaWorld Themepark would increase the development potential of Genting Highlands. TA added that the SamaWorld project could help Genting's resort arm Resort World Bhd to diversify into property development and property could become a second core business after gaming for Genting. The official statement of Genting Bhd was: "Its a big world". Genting Bhd argued that the SamaWorld Theme Park would complement its own hotel and entertainment business and as the largest facility of its kind would vastly increase traffic to the Genting Highlands. SamaWorld resort project manager K.L. Chan said: "our project will change the world image of Genting Highlands from a gamblers resort to a place for the family." A collaboration with Genting Bhd to develop the SamaWorld theme park was considered.

=== SamaWorld Theme Park ===
Planned was a Disneyland-type theme park with the concept "See the World in a Day". The continents Asia, Europe, Africa, and America would have been represented by attractions and landmark-replicas of different countries and the different areas connected via cable cars.

1. Asian Adventure: Planned to have traditional Malaysian and colonial style facades behind the main entrance, with a representation of all 13 federal Malaysian states (for example, Selangor with a craftsman making pewter objects and satay), a full-size 130m long replication of the Great Wall of China, built with the assistance of the Chinese Government, the Krakatoa volcano with a working eruption, a Japanese garden, a Japanese tea cup ride, and other activities from India, Singapore and Hong Kong.
2. European Fantasy: Planned to have King Arthur's castle with Merlin's magic show, a hall with artificial falling snow called the Ice Kingdom, Viking longboat rides, and Venice gondola rides.
3. The Americas: Planned to have a Wild West Town including saloons and cowboys, and for South America, a jungle terrain with a water log flume canoe ride as an "Indiana Jones" type adventure, and an Inca pyramid.
4. Sama 5000: Planned to have a futuristic World with intergalactic battles.

In 1986, it was announced that Sequoia Creative, a company from Los Angeles founded by the former Walt Disney executives Dave Schweninger, Thomas Reidenbach and Robert Gurr would equip SamaWorld with animated attractions. For example, Capt. Andy's RiverTowne Revue, which featured a cast of 14 animated characters singing and telling jokes in 15 minute musical revues. Architect of the theme-park was Kumpulan Akitek Sdn Bhd. The design of the park was by the Dallas based company Leisure and Recreation Concepts (LARC) with Michael Jenkins as Concept Designer. The Sidney based Woodhead Firth Lee architects designed residential villas with a European village theme and made the interior design of the Ice Kingdom, the Americas and the entertainment centre. Planned was a total of 42 rides including a Von Roll Skyway over the rainforest, a Vekoma Mine Train, a Mack Log Flume, a Zierer Wave Swinger, a Fionda Boat Swing, a Dragon coaster, and a monorail. SamaWorld purchased nearly all rides. The park would have started to operate under SamaWorld Theme Park Sdn Bhd, a subsidiary of SamaWorld (Malaysia). A mostly US staffed management team trained 1400 locals to run the hotel, restaurants and underground interactive rides. Construction was by Bovis (Malaysia) Sdn Bhd. Later SamaWorld got into a legal dispute wit Bovis and Actacorp took over the construction. Entrance fees for adults were set to 30 Ringgit and for Children to 20 Ringgit. The planned opening hours were weekdays 11 am to 7 pm and weekends/holidays 11 am to 10 pm. Expected were three million visitors with 80 % locals in the first year of operation. Taiwans Tung-Hai University planned a permanent management training chapter in the middle of SamaWorld.

=== SamaWorld Theme Resort (Resort Hotel) ===
Construction of the 850-room four-star hotel consisting of a three-level podium, a five-level car park, a 17-storey and eight storey tower had started. Planned were leisure facilities like a tennis court, a games room, and a health spa. The development cost was 300 million Ringgit. Architect was Gerak Reka Akitek Sdn. The construction company was Cygal Bhd, the technical consultant was Hotel Resources International (M) Sdn Bhd and the land was owned by SamaWorld Theme Hotel Sdn Bhd. Construction stopped at 4 storey's height. Cygal (now Sycal) had a 70 % share of the hotel development and is now constructing the Genting Sky City project on the site.

=== Residential and commercial development ===
At first the development of 324 bungalows by MCB Holdings Bhd was planned. Landowner was Golden Apartments Sdn Bhd. Later MCB Holdings withdraw the deal. In 1990 Giant Bay Resources acquired Techlines Corp Sdn Bhd, a bankrupt company that owned the land surrounding SamaWorld. Techlines was renamed Giant Bay (Malaysia) Sdn Bhd. Giant Bay (M) was responsible for the residential and commercial development around SamaWorld. Planned were apartments, condominiums, and bungalows (Regency Village, Asian Village, International Village) on an 80-hectare site. Financing was partly through a 10 million Dollar loan from Citibank. Giant Bay (M) changed the name to Villa Genting and finished the apartment Amber Court. Construction of the Billion Court Condominiums started but was never finished. The NCT-Group purchased the abandoned Billion Court and developed it with the Ion Delemen high-rise complex.

=== Long-term plans ===
SamaWorld aimed to become an international brand. Therefore, SamaWorld was incorporated in different countries with SamaWorld Hong Kong, SamaWorld Japan, SamaWorld Singapore, and SamaWorld Vancouver. Another SamaWorld with the same concept was planned in Beijing, and in 1990, preliminary talks with the Chinese authorities were held.

=== Environmental concerns ===
Land clearing in the Cameron Highlands lead to massive siltation resulting in floods and landslides. It was feared that clearing of the 800 year old forest on top of Genting Highlands would have a similar impact like in the Cameron Highlands. The Department of Environment set down 26 conditions for the land clearing work. SamaWorld complied with all of them. The water quality of rivers nearby was tested regularly. It was noticed that water of the Sungai Perting river, which flows into the Chamang waterfall, turned murky. The cause was silt from the SamaWorld project site and other projects in the area. SamaWorld conducted a study to find a solution and submitted a 70-page report on erosion mitigation measures which was approved. SamaWorld built 25 large siltation dams and introduced a better drainage system to prevent further pollution down hill.

=== Redevelopment plans ===
Redevelopment of the abandoned site would be difficult, due to a limited infrastructure capacity mainly in water supply. A mixed development with serviced apartments, together with a sewage treatment and a water treatment plant, was proposed in 2015.
