= Amber Court =

Apartment complex and former hotel in Genting Highlands, Malaysia

Coordinates: 3.430597°N 101.788894°E

Golden Hills Resort Apartments
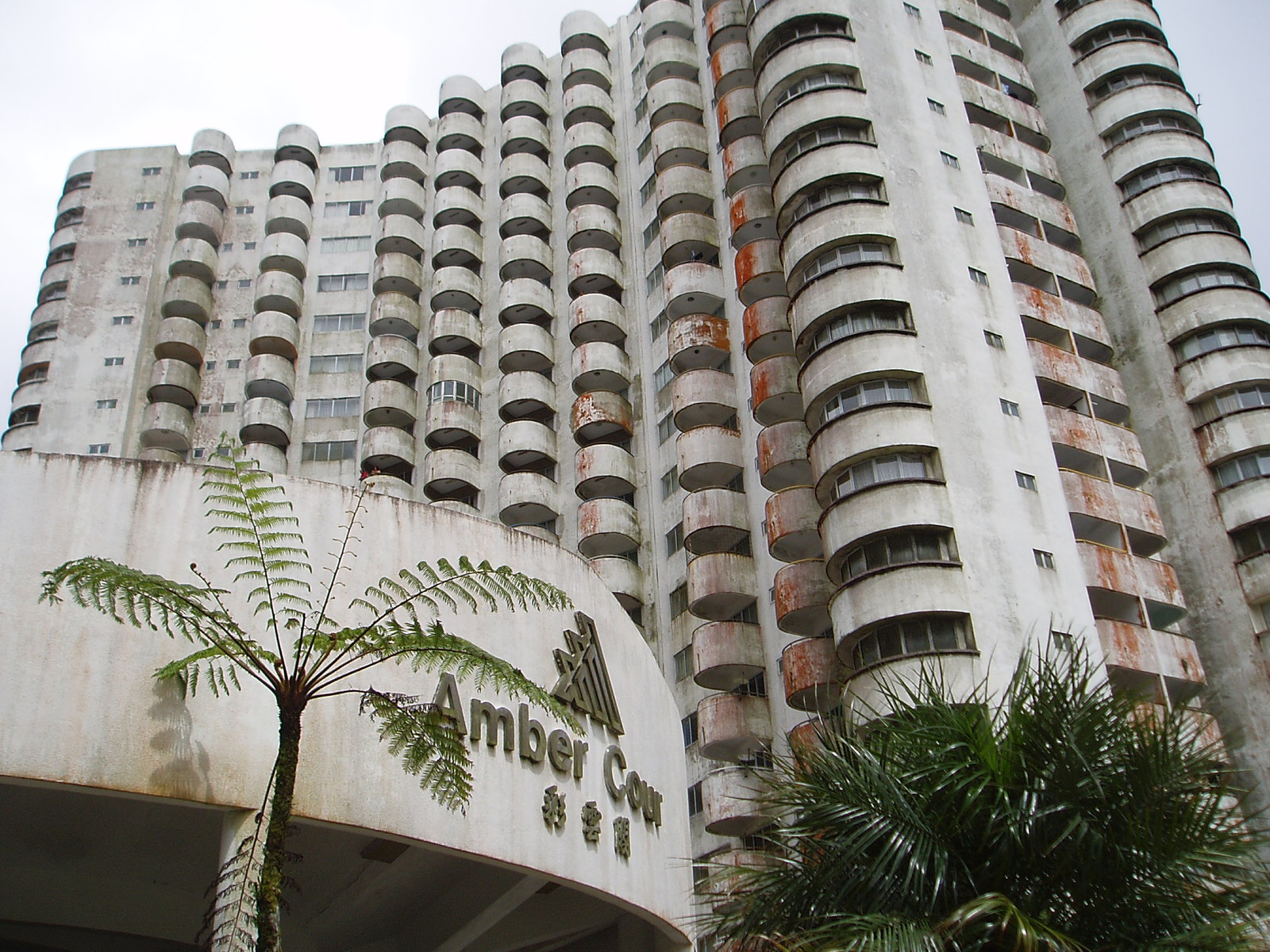
- Former names: Amber Court Resort Apartments
- Alternative names: 彩云阁

Record height
- Tallest in Pahang from 1996 to 2001^{[I]}
- Preceded by: Teruntum Complex
- Surpassed by: First World Hotel

General information
- Elevation: 5,600 ft (1,700 m)
- Opened: 1996; 30 years ago

Height
- Height: 92.08 m (302.1 ft)

Technical details
- Floor count: 23
- Lifts/elevators: 6 (originally by Schindler)

Design and construction
- Architect: Gerak Reka Akitek Sdn
- Developer: Villa Genting Development Sdn Bhd
- Main contractor: Teknik Cekap Sdn Bhd

Golden Hills Resort Apartments is an apartment complex in Genting Highlands, Pahang, Malaysia. It was formerly known as Amber Court Resort Apartments. It contains two 23-storey apartment towers (Parkview with Block A, B, C and Hillview with Block D, E, F) including three levels of car parks and two levels of retail podiums. The estimated height is 92 m. The 692 apartments are used for apartment rentals, timeshare and homestay, while the 55 commercial lots are occupied by a variety of shops and businesses.

== History ==
Golden Hills Resort Apartments is a resort-apartment venture built in Malaysia’s tiger-economy period of the 1990s. The Canadian mining company Giant Bay Resources Ltd. developed together with Samaworld (Malaysia) Sdn Bhd the new Disney-like SamaWorld theme park in the Genting Highlands.

=== Planning ===
In 1990 Giant Bay acquired the bankrupt company Techlines Corp Sdn Bhd that owned the land surrounding SamaWorld. Techlines was renamed Giant Bay (Malaysia) Sdn Bhd. Giant Bay's Hong Kong entity Giant Bay Capital (HK) Ltd. owned Giant Bay (Malaysia). Giant Bay (Malaysia) under president Richard J. Leibel was responsible for the residential and commercial development around SamaWorld. Planned were resort apartments, hilltop condominiums, bungalows (Regency Village, Asian Village, International Village), and a hotel on an 80-hectare (200-acre) site. The estimated total development cost was 500 million Malaysian Ringgit (approx. 188.13 million US dollars). The apartment project of Giant Bay Development Sdn Bhd was called Samaworld Parkview And Hillview Resort Apartments or just Resort Apartments, and was later called Amber Court Resort Apartments. Sometimes it is listed as Parkview and Hillview Apartments. Cost of the project was 70 million Ringgit. Planned were 688 individually owned apartments of various sizes (number later increased) with hotel-service to generate income for investors. In 1991 the freehold apartments were marketed under the slogan "Cool Investment - Hot Returns".

=== Financing ===
Citibank N.A. (M) and Scotiabank partly financed the project. Non-Malaysian companies were required permission to carry large loans. Giant Bay negotiated a deal to carry a Citibank loan of 27 million Ringgit (approx. 10 million US dollars) but negotiations of a loan extension with Malaysia’s central bank failed. To secure funds for the project Giant Bay Capital (HK) had to sell 51% of Giant Bay (Malaysia) to the Malaysian company Campoc Realty Sdn Bhd. As a majority Malaysian-owned company it had unrestricted borrowing powers. Giant Bay (Malaysia) changed the name to Villa Genting Sdn Bhd and Giant Bay Development was called Villa Genting Development Sdn Bhd (VGD). The whole development was called Villa D'Genting Resort. In 1993 Giant Bay Resources sold the remaining 49% shares.

=== Construction and early years ===
Infrastructure work began in October 1990. Giant Bay completed the road construction. Land Clearing work for the Resort Apartments began in February 1991. According to PR Newswire, the construction of the apartment platform was completed in 1991. The main construction started around 1994 and Amber Court opened around 1996. The architect was Gerak Reka Akitek Sdn and the consulting engineer was Angkasa Jurutera Perunding Sdn Bhd. Villa Genting Development got into a legal dispute with the construction company Teknik Cekap Sdn Bhd. Purchasers of apartments were mainly Malaysian and Singaporean investors and companies like Berjaya (held 30% interest in Villa Genting Sdn Bhd), WTK Holdings (formerly Samanda Holdings), and KFC Holdings (Malaysia). Leisure Holidays bought 36 apartments for their timeshare concept. The fully furnished rooms were used as serviced apartments for tourists and residential apartments. A variety of recreation and conferencing facilities such as a sauna, gymnasium, indoor games room, conference halls (Cassa, Victoria, Jasmin and Camilla rooms), banquet halls, and a restaurant (Paloma Garden Cafe) were offered, and a free shuttle service to Genting Bus Terminal was provided. The site was managed by VG (Villa Genting) Resort Management Sdn Bhd.

=== Struggle after the financial crisis ===
The development was severely affected by the Asian financial crisis in 1997, and Villa Genting Development Sdn Bhd struggled financially. Numerous purchasers defaulted on progress payments as uncertainty grew about whether the surrounding SamaWorld theme park could be completed. Villa Genting Development Sdn Bhd went into liquidation in the early 2000s due to unpaid taxes. Amber Court Owners and Residents Association (ACORA), consisting of Amber court owners, was formed in attempt to continue to manage the building.

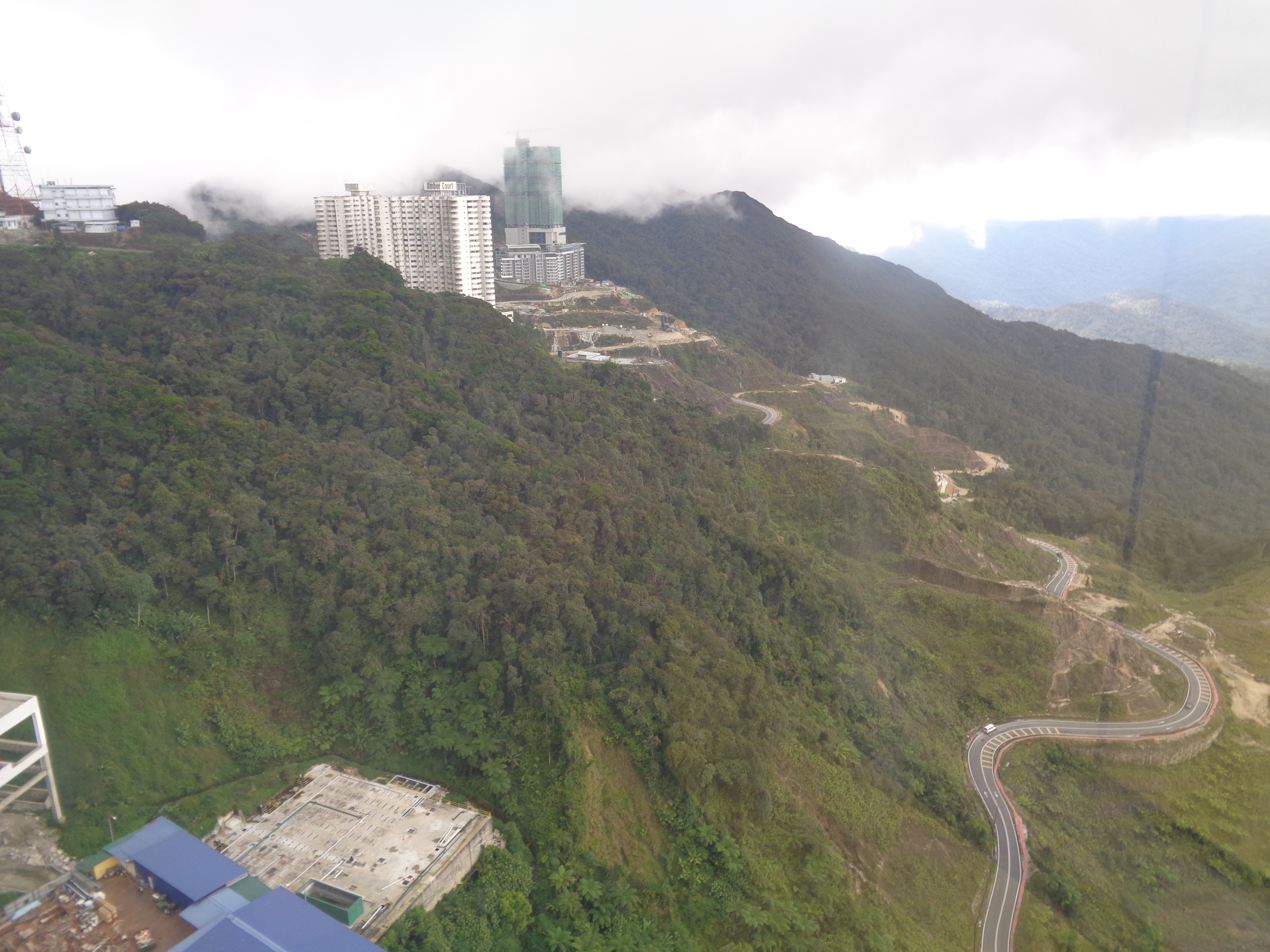
Road leading to Amber Court in 2016.

As a result of the developer being wound up, management of the property entered a period of legal uncertainty. Many owners subsequently refused to pay for maintenance and service charges. While ACORA attempted to manage the building, it did not have statutory authority to act as the building's management body. Disputes between ACORA and the developer's management company further complicated the building's management. To compel owners to pay them the maintenance and service charges, the management company disconnected water supply to parcels that refused to pay them. Owners ceased using their unit, contributing to the property's decline.

The water supply infrastructure supplying Amber Court also went into liquidation in 2004. This resulted in recurring water supply disruptions. As the location was relatively remote and the condition of the access road was very poor, rental demand remained low and the economic value of the property plummeted and Amber Court became a distressed building.

=== Formation and management by the Joint Management Body ===
Amber Court Joint Management Body (ACJMB) was formed in 2006, but the maintenance of the building was difficult due to low collection rates, allegations of financial mismanagement, limited technical expertise and recurring water supply disruptions.

In 2012 numerous projects were proposed and Amber Court was partially refurbished. This included outdoor and indoor repairs and the building was repainted. Some landscaping were also added, however the building infrastructure and services continued to deteriorate. Water leakages frequently flooded corridors, damaging lifts and electrical switchboards. 2 of the 6 elevators were scrapped for parts to keep the remaining 4 operational, as ACJMB could not afford replacement parts.

=== Formation of the Management Corporation ===
After the successful issuance of strata titles to the owners, Amber Court Management Corporation (ACMC) was formed in 2013. ACMC focused its efforts on restoring the building infrastructure to make it serviceable for rental.

In the same time, Genting Malaysia announced the construction of a new theme park with Twentieth Century Fox. NCT Group also announced their development project Grand Ion Delemen, which is neighboring Amber Court. This created a surge in demand for worker accommodation in Genting Highlands. Numerous owners took the opportunity to rent out their units to construction companies to accommodate the construction workers.

=== Challenges maintaining the building ===
The wet and foggy climate in Genting Highlands promoted the growth of red algae and mold on the facade. This resulted in a neglected and abandoned appearance which inspired peoples' imagination and led to many haunted stories.

The building is undergoing renovation work and bears a new grey paint scheme. About RM1.4 million were spent as of June 2022.

=== Billion Court ===
Villa Genting Properties Sdn Bhd (VGP) (also a subsidiary of Villa Genting Berhad) developed the Billion Court Resort Condominium (Hilltop Condominiums) next to Amber Court. The project was presented to purchasers in March 1996 at the Shangri-La Hotel Kuala Lumpur. Construction of the project consisting of three (initial four) 26-storey blocks, two 9-storey blocks, and a 6-storey car park started. The project cost was around 100 million Malaysian Ringgit (approx. 37 million US dollars). The architect was ADC Akitek Sdn Bhd and engineer was Meinhardt (Malaysia) Sdn Bhd. During construction, Villa Genting Properties got into a legal dispute with the construction company Muhibbah Engineering (M) Bhd. Billion Court could not be finished because of the Asian Financial Crisis, and Villa Genting Properties was included in the Malaysian blacklist for developers involved in abandoned projects. In 2012, the NCT Group took over the project that was inactive since 2002, and developed the site with the Ion Delemen high-rise complex.

=== Notable facts ===
- Giant Bay (Canada) was formerly a mining company specialist in bioleaching. Giant Bay and the Giant Bay Investment Fund was involved in the Canadian Immigrant Investor Program scandal where money of the immigrant investment fund ICC was missing. Affected were Taiwanese and Hong Kong immigrants which obtained their visa by investing in the immigrant fund. The court concluded that the money for the business deal in Malaysia was borrowed and repaid legitimately and Mr. Leibel was cleared of all charges.
- The earthworks for Villa Genting were carried out by the same company as for the KLCC, Saracorp Sdn Bhd.
- As of April 2022, several apartments are left unclaimed while others belonged to private owners.

== Trivia ==
- Amber Court was used as a location for the 2017 horror movie Haunted Hotel.
- The German TV series Galileo (ProSieben) made a documentary about Amber Court in 2020.
