= Bellevue City Hall =

City hall building of Bellevue, Washington, United States

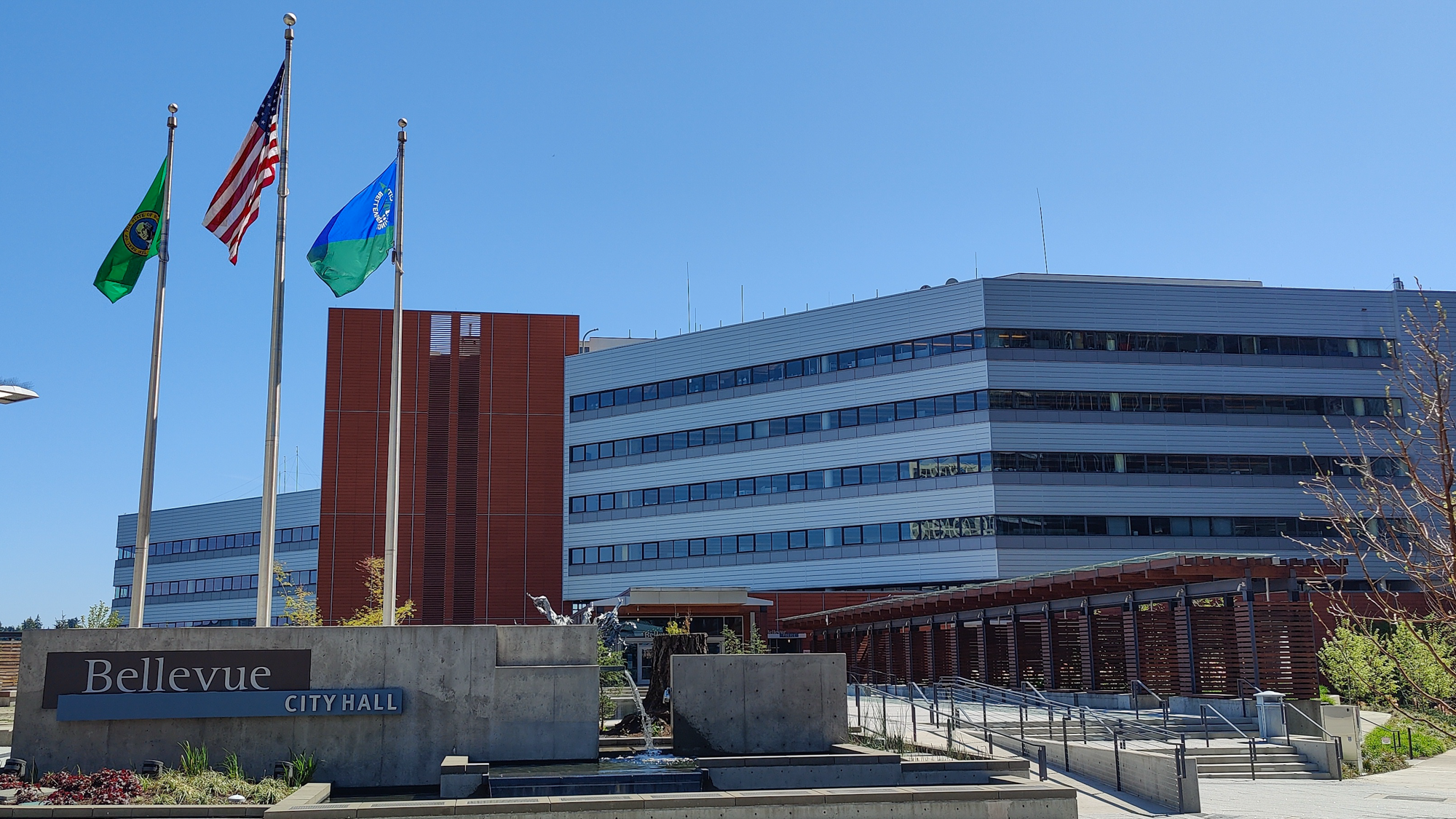
- Former names: 450 Bell Terrace

General information
- Status: Completed
- Type: Government office building
- Location: 450 110th Avenue NE; Bellevue, Washington
- Coordinates: 47°36′51.7″N 122°11′32.9″W
- Completed: 1983
- Renovated: 2006
- Renovation cost: $121 million
- Owner: City of Bellevue

Technical details
- Floor count: 7

Design and construction
- Architect: Wright Forsen

Renovating team
- Renovating firm: SRG Partnership
- Main contractor: Lease Crutcher Lewis

The Bellevue City Hall is a government office building and city hall in Bellevue, Washington. The current city hall, located in Downtown Bellevue, opened in 2006 after the $121 million renovation of a former Qwest data center. The data center, originally built for Pacific Northwest Bell in 1983, was acquired by the city government in 2002 for use by the Bellevue Police Department and later approved as the new city hall. It incorporates use of wood interiors and a terra cotta exterior that has been recognized with several design awards since its opening.

The city hall replaced an older office complex outside of downtown that was originally built in 1964. The site was renovated and expanded in 1978, but was slated for replacement a decade later. It was demolished in 2007 and replaced with a Lexus car dealership. The current city hall is located adjacent to the Bellevue Transit Center and a light rail station on the 2 Line that opened in 2024.

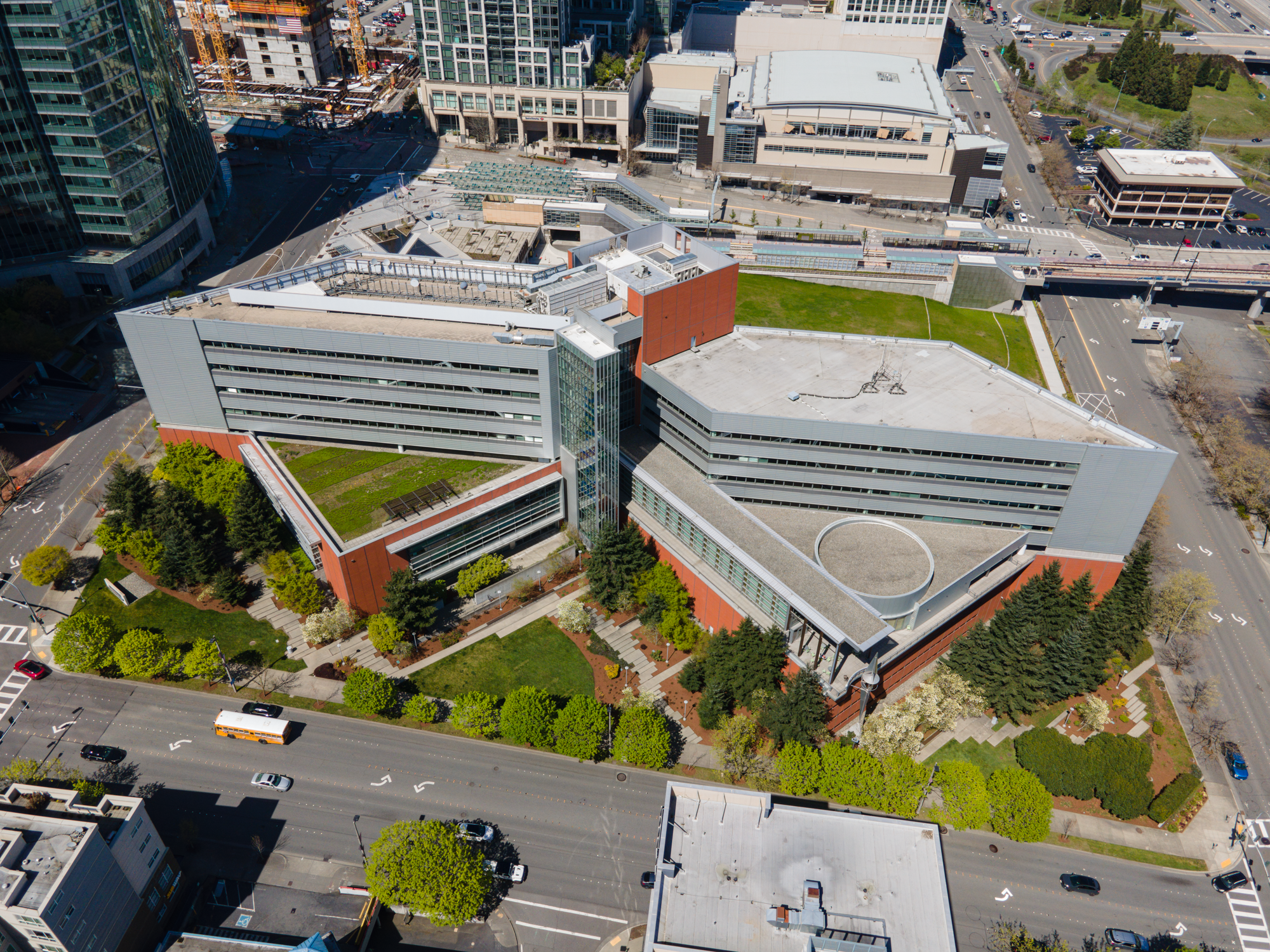
Aerial view of the Bellevue City Hall

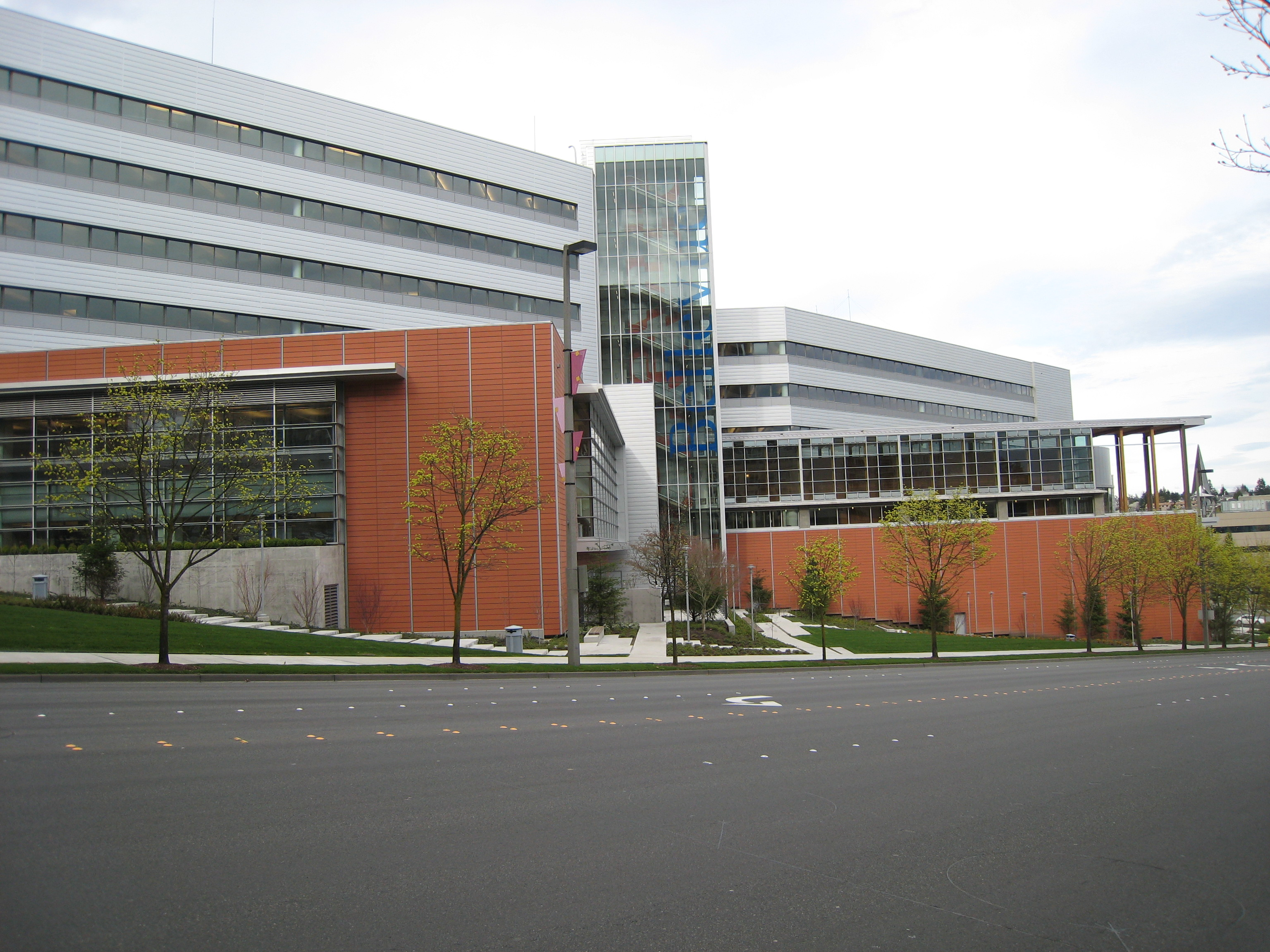
South end of the city hall in 2007

== Former city halls ==
Following the incorporation of Bellevue as a city on March 31, 1953, the government chose to lease the second floor of the Veterans of Foreign Wars office as its first seat of government. The building, located at Main Street and 100th Avenue, was originally opened in 1893 as the city's first schoolhouse and later served as the city's first library.

An advisory committee was formed by the city council in 1956 to propose sites for a new city hall and civic center campus. The city council placed a $250,000 bond issue on the November 1956 ballot to fund the construction of a new city hall, but voters defeated the proposition. City offices instead moved to a former hardware store near the Bellevue Square shopping center in 1960.

Preliminary plans for a consolidated municipal office building were approved by the city council in February 1963, with the $320,000 cost being funded with regular tax income, rather than a bond measure as previously attempted. The new civic center would be located on the south side of Main Street between Interstate 405 and 116th Avenue. The three-story building, which would serve as Bellevue's city hall, was dedicated on March 7, 1964, by Governor Albert D. Rosellini. A public library was opened adjacent to the municipal building in 1967, as part of the development of the 8-acre (3.2 ha) civic center campus.

By 1969, the city hall was described as "badly crowded" because of Bellevue's rapid population growth, and the campus was seen as a possible home for the Bellevue School District and King County offices. City manager L. Joe Miller proposed a combined civic complex with a city hall, school district offices, and county facilities the following year, but the grand plan was not pursued by the city government. In 1978, a $4 million, five-story office building was constructed on the civic center campus to serve as an addition to the city hall; the new building consolidated offices from three other locations within the city. The new building, called the "ugliest ever built east of Lake Washington", was built for future conversion into a conventional office building once the city's offices moved to Wilburton Hill. The existing city hall was vacated and renovated to add a modern facade, air conditioning, and an additional floor.

In the late 1980s, the city of Bellevue began studying a possible civic center with a new city hall, courthouses, a jail, a museum and a basketball arena for the Seattle SuperSonics. The civic center plan was scaled back to a single convention center in downtown Bellevue, Meydenbauer Center, and a new downtown library, both of which opened in 1993; the plan for a city hall was seen as controversial and unnecessary at the time. In 1990, the city hall area was proposed as the site of a county jail and courthouse to serve the Eastside. The proposed site, located north of city hall, was seen as undesirable because of its existing wetlands and was rejected in favor of a site near Overlake Hospital Medical Center.

After Bellevue's decision to relocate city offices to Downtown Bellevue, the 10.7-acre (4.3 ha) site was sold in 2003 for $24.7 million to a Lexus car dealership. The new dealership opened in 2007, using 7 acres (2.8 ha) of the property.

== Current city hall ==
450 Bell Terrace, a nine-story, 476,270-square-foot (44,247 m^{2}) building, was completed in 1983 for Pacific Northwest Bell. The building housed a computer farm, telecommunications infrastructure, offices, and a parking garage. Pacific Northwest Bell was later acquired by US West Communications, which in turn became part of Qwest in 2000.

In early 2002, Qwest approached the City of Bellevue with an offer to purchase the building from them, as office vacancies had been high in recent years. The city had already been considering a new headquarters for their police department and studied whether to build a new city hall in Downtown Bellevue. On November 25, 2002, the City of Bellevue agreed to purchase the Qwest building for $29 million, primarily to house the police and fire departments after $33 million in renovations. The city council approved a preliminary plan to move other city offices into the Qwest building in March 2003, citing lower maintenance costs and plentiful capacity in the new building. The plan was finalized in July, estimating the total cost of renovation at $102.4 million (including $29 million used to purchase the building in 2002), and returning the city hall to downtown for the first time in 25 years. To finance the project, the city issued $103 million in 40-year municipal bonds, which were partially refunded in 2012.

The existing Qwest building, described as a "foreboding" structure and an "architectural eyesore", would need to undergo a year-long renovation to become a "hub of civic life". SRG Partnership was selected as the project's lead architect, and presented a new design for the building to the city council in February 2004. The concrete exterior would be clad in gray metal and red-brown terra cotta, and the dirt parking lot to the northwest of the block would become a public plaza and grass lawn. The center concourse would receive large windows and wood finishes, ending at a new city council chamber.

A groundbreaking ceremony for the new city hall was held on July 29, 2004, and construction began under the direction of contractor Lease Crutcher Lewis, who built the original city hall, the following month. During construction, inaccuracies and omissions in the design and problems with demolishing parts of the building led to delays and an over-run of $19.6 million, bringing the final budget to $121 million. The new city hall opened on February 21, 2006, and received praise for its use of wood panels and the concourse's terrazzo flooring. The city hall's lower two floors, including the concourse, service desks, and the city council chamber, are open to the public; the remaining five floors house offices for city services. The city hall was granted an American Institute of Architects Honor Award by the Seattle chapter, as well as an Environmental Protection Agency Energy Star award for energy efficiency. The landscaped plaza was also recognized by the Canadian Society of Landscape Architects with a National Merit Award in 2008.

In 2013, Sound Transit finalized its route for the East Link light rail project, serving Seattle, Bellevue and Redmond. It included the selection of the City Hall Plaza for the site of a station to serve Bellevue Transit Center. The light rail line, later named the 2 Line, opened in April 2024 and emerges from a tunnel under the transit center and continues east onto an elevated guideway that crosses 112th Avenue Northeast. The station's entrance is at the northwest end of City Hall Plaza, which was rebuilt from 2017 to 2023 to prepare for the opening of the 2 Line. The plaza includes a bronze sculpture by Dan Corson and statues from Bellevue's sister city of Hualien, Taiwan. A vacant part of the city hall complex is slated to be used for transit-oriented development.

In 2016, the Bellevue city council considered protecting the city hall's view of Mount Rainier, which would have been blocked under a proposed high-rise zoning plan for the East Main light rail station. The proposal, requested by city staffers, was intended to protect the view from public areas of the building, according to city spokespeople. The city council decided against a formal protection of the view, favoring increased development near transit.
