= Meydenbauer Center =

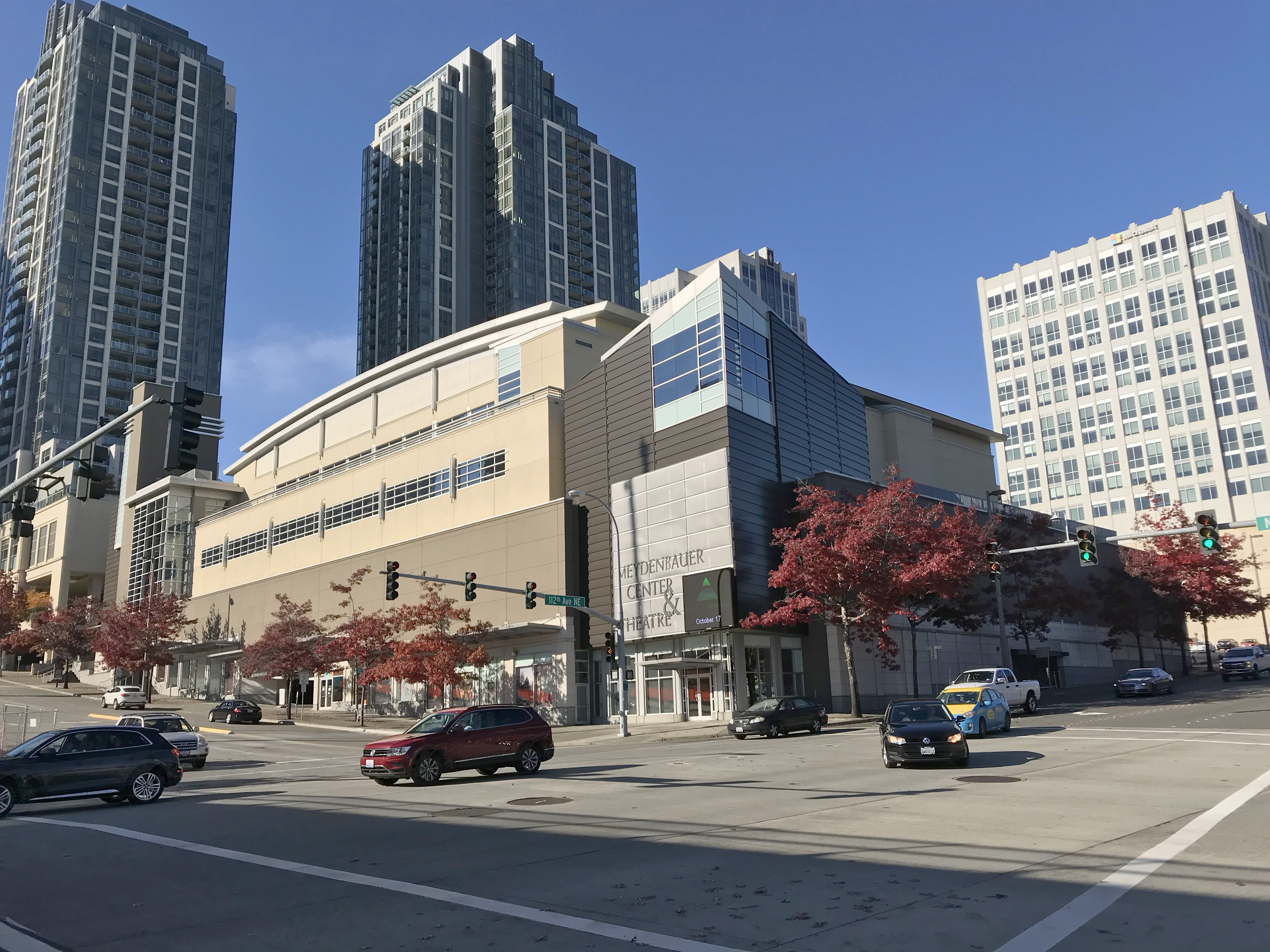
- Interactive map of Meydenbauer Center
- Address: 11100 NE 6th St.
- Location: Bellevue, Washington
- Coordinates: 47.615999°N 122.191602°W
- Owner: Bellevue Convention Center Authority
- Operator: Bellevue Convention Center Authority

Convention use
- Exhibit hall floor: 36,000 sq ft (3,300 m^{2})

Construction
- Opened: 1993

Website
- www.meydenbauer.com

Meydenbauer Center is a convention center in Bellevue, Washington. It is located adjacent to Bellevue City Hall and Interstate 405. The center opened in 1993. It has a 36,000-square-foot (3,300 m^{2}) exhibition hall, a 12,000-square-foot (1,100 m^{2}) meeting room, a 410-seat performing arts theatre, and 434 parking spaces. In 2009 the center added a 2,500 sqft executive center that includes three meeting rooms. Meydenbauer Center hosts over 300 events each year including conventions, corporate meetings and events, and trade shows.

It is owned and operated by Bellevue Convention Center Authority (BCCA). The BCCA Board of Directors are appointed by the Bellevue City Manager and confirmed by the Bellevue City Council.
