= Bellevue Police Department (Washington) =

Municipal police department in Washington state, U.S.

- Abbreviation: BPD

Agency overview
- Preceding agency: Municipal Police
- Employees: 255
- Annual budget: $52,000,000

Jurisdictional structure
- Operations jurisdiction: Bellevue, Washington, United States
- Population: 152,700
- General nature: Local civilian police

Operational structure
- Police Officers: 205
- Civilians: 50
- Agency executive: Wendell Shirley, Chief
- Special Units: List: Patrol; Investigations; SWAT; Traffic; SET
- Stations: List: City Hall Station; Factoria Substation; Crossroads Substation

Website
- Bellevue Police Department

The Bellevue Police Department is located in Bellevue, Washington. As of 2024, there were 205 commissioned officers and 50 civilian employees within the department's overall budget. The department's annual operating budget is about $51 million. It services 152,700 people. The main Bellevue Police Station is located in Bellevue City Hall, at 450 110th Avenue Northeast. There are also two other substations throughout the city in Factoria and Crossroads. BPD patrols six districts. The current Chief of Police is Wendell Shirley.

== Command structure ==
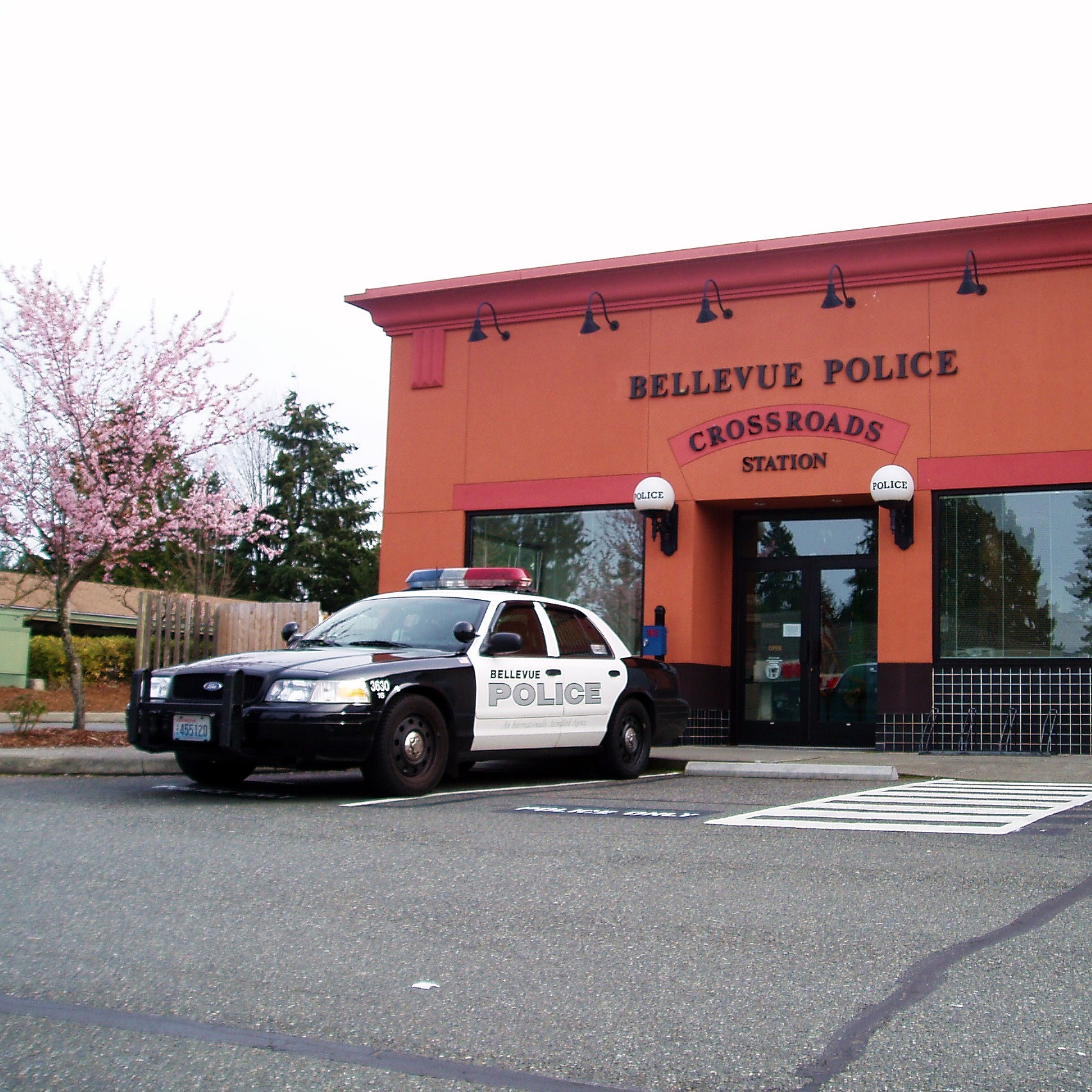
A Bellevue, Washington, police car at the Crossroads station

- Police Chief Wendell Shirley
- Assistant Chief Constance Slappey
- Assistant Chief Andrew Popochock
- Major of Investigations, Ellen Inman
- Major of Operations, Mark Tarantino
- Major of Planning, Research, and Policy, Dave Sanabria

== History ==
Bellevue became incorporated in 1953 and the police department was created by City Ordinance #8 on April 28, 1953. Chief G.L. "Jerry" Plowman was appointed as Chief of Police. By May 1953, staff included four officers (Chief Plowman, Sgt. George Whitman, and Officers Bob Sollitto and Jack Allen), and service was 24 hours per day. The first police headquarters was located at Chief Plowman's house in the Surrey Downs neighborhood, where calls would be taken and the porch light turned on to notify Chief Plowman to stop by for orders. Police headquarters was moved to a rented space in the old V.F.W. hall, and in 1954 an old school at 100th Avenue and Main Street became the new home of the City of Bellevue. During the department's formative years, surrounding departments, including the King County Police and the Washington State Patrol, helped the new staff at BPD to get started, and the city of Kirkland rented space in their jail for Bellevue to use in 1954. By 1955, the population of Bellevue was 9,000, and there were 10 Officers working for the department. In October 1960, the department moved into new quarters at 106th Avenue NE and NE 8th Street.

By 1962, the population of Bellevue was 14,700, with department personnel numbering 22 sworn officers. In 1963, the department had its first dispatch center. In 1964, the department moved to 116th Avenue SE and Main Street, where it remained until 2006. In 1965, the department created a traffic division, and assigned 5 officers to Traffic enforcement duties. Also in 1965, Bellevue experienced its first homicide. In 1968, Bellevue had 49 sworn officers. That same year the college incentive program was offered.

By 1970, the city, through annexation, had grown to be the 4th largest city in the state of Washington, and the department had 92 personnel. In 1971, the department formed the vice and narcotics detail, as well as the harbor patrol. In 1972, the rank of Sergeant was eliminated as part of a motion to combine the police and fire departments. The potential merger drew intense criticism and was eventually scrapped, but the Sergeant's position was never reinstated, and first line supervisors in the department remain lieutenants. In 1973, the department grew to 106 personnel, including 26 civilian personnel. In May of that year, one person was killed and another injured by the "Bellevue sniper." The sniper was apprehended and later convicted for homicide.

In June 1975, the department entered into a new phase of policing, called "team policing," in which officers worked more closely with the community than they had in the past. In order to meet the increased demands on the patrol section, 10 new positions were added in 1981. The city's public safety training center became a reality in 1983. The training facility houses a firing range, exercise facility, classrooms, drill tower, and K-9 area, as well as a large paved parking lot which is used for motorcycle officer training and re-certification.

The decade between 1975 and 1984 saw many advances and changes with the department. During those years the crime prevention unit was formed, uniformed officers took a greater role in investigations, the Tactical Arms Group was formed, and the crime analysis unit was formed. 1986 saw the beginning of the Crime Scene Investigator (CSI) role. 7 officers received the initial training, which involved crime scene and evidence processing. CSI officers gather evidence at major crime scenes, resulting in faster and more thorough crime scene processing.

In 1990, there were 144 police officers in Bellevue. A 1991 survey of Bellevue residents found that 85.7 percent of respondents reported feeling very safe or moderately safe in their neighborhoods. Also in 1991 there were, for the first time in nearly two decades, no fatal traffic collisions. The first citizens academy graduated in 1992, and has been an important community outreach program that continues to this day. In 1994 and 1995, the department went through several changes, including the opening of the Factoria substation, the initiation of a summer park patrol program, and the receipt of a federal grant which added 4 officers to the department. In 1998 the traffic division was moved under the umbrella of the patrol section, and the department also formed its honor guard that year. The department moved into the new Bellevue City Hall located at 450 110th Avenue NE in April 2006.

== Sections of department ==
=== Patrol ===
Patrol Operations, which includes the Traffic Unit, is the largest and most visible section in the department. Other units within Patrol include the bike patrol, the Downtown Unit, the Community Stations in Crossroads and Factoria, the Bellevue Light Rail Unit (BLU) and the K-9 Unit. Specialty assignments in Patrol include Special Weapons and Tactics (SWAT), Bomb Squad, Crisis Response Team, Crowd Control, Crime Scene Investigators (CSI), Field Training Officers (FTO), and Honor Guard. After several years of staffing challenges, in 2019 the Bellevue Police Department was nearly fully staffed, with only a few openings, mainly for newly non-commissioned employees. In spite of past staffing shortages, Bellevue residents experienced a decrease in property crimes for the fifth year in a row. In 2018, residential burglaries decreased by 21% and car prowls decreased 20% over 2017. Bellevue continues to enjoy a very low crime rate compared to similarly sized cities.

The Bellevue Police Sector Captain program continues to successfully connect Bellevue residents with the Sector Captains responsible for their defined area. Chief Steve Mylett began the program in 2015 when he saw a need for a direct point of contact for Bellevue residents or businesses with questions or concerns related to crime or police activity. The city is split into three sectors, North, West, and South. The Citizens Advisory Councils were formed as an important part of the Bellevue Tomorrows Program. The program is designed to examine successes of the past and current policies, practices, and procedures of the Bellevue Police Department, with an eye towards making lasting improvements for the future. The six citizen advisory councils incorporate a broad cross-section of the Bellevue community. The first Citizen Advisory Council formed in early 2016 with the African American Advisory Council. Since then, six additional councils have been formed: Muslim, Latino, LGBTQI, Interfaith, Asian and Pacific Islander, and South Asian. The advisory councils meet regularly and discuss how to improve the delivery of services that the Bellevue Police Department provides to the community. The councils collaborate with the department on projects and provide guidance to the Chief of Police on best practices and approaches. They also help to identify barriers that exist between police officers and members of the community and develop strategies to eliminate the barriers.

=== Community policing ===
Community policing is a main focus of the Bellevue Police Department and is accomplished in numerous ways. The department's Sector Captain program puts residents directly in touch with Captains in charge of issues for the different sectors in the city. The department also has two substations, one at the Factoria Mall, and the other at the Crossroads Mall, where residents can ask questions, get information and report crimes. BPD also offers a Community Academy twice a year to engage the community and invite them take a deep dive behind the scenes and really learn what officers and specialties do. A 2020 survey showed that the public strongly supports the Bellevue Police department, and feels safe in Bellevue. More than 96% of people surveyed feel safe walking in Bellevue during the day and more than 80% feel safe after dark. BPD officers regularly partner with community organizations to serve food, distribute free groceries, and collect and deliver furniture to those in need. Each year, officers participate in "Shop with a Cop", the Child Safety Fair, and National Night Out.

== Crime ==
BPD offers a crime map on their website through CrimeMapper:

	2016	2017	2018	2019	2020
Violent crimes					
Homicide	0	0	0	1	7
Rape	15	24	25	28	21
Robbery	63	59	87	77	70
Aggravated Assault	58	65	76	84	102
Violent Crime Total	136	148	188	190	200
Property crimes					
Burglary	636	570	524	403	542
Larceny	3615	3568	3602	3578	3742
MV Theft	323	331	386	358	305
Arson	13	21	13	3	13
Property Crime Total	4587	4490	4525	4342	4602
Total Part 1 Crimes	4723	4638	4713	4532	4802

== Recruiting ==
The Bellevue Police Department recruits and hires both entry level and experienced (lateral) police officers. Entry level applicants are screened through NationalTestingNetwork.com, and take a reading, writing, video and physical fitness test. Lateral officers apply through the recruiting website portal with a streamlined process that does not include a physical fitness test and only requires out of state applicants to travel once. Testing results and veteran's preference points are used to compose civil service eligibility lists from which open positions are filled.

Civilian employees are recruited and hired through the City of Bellevue for positions in police records, data entry, the crime lab, and more.

The Bellevue Police Department is hiring lateral police officers and new recruits. As of June 2021, entry level officers enjoy a starting yearly salary of $77,263, plus incentives. After three years, base pay increases to $100,231 annually, plus incentives and overtime. Lateral officers start at $94,061 annually and increase to $100,231 after three years. There are additional pay incentives for detectives, field training officers, motorcycle officers, bicycle patrol, K-9, bomb technicians, traffic collision investigators, SWAT officers, Crisis Response Team negotiators, and more. Longevity and education pay incentives are also available and may "stack" with other incentives.

The Bellevue Police Department also offers excellent medical plans for employees and their family members, as well as dental and vision benefits. Retirement plans include the state LEOFF pension plan and the MEBT plan available to all City of Bellevue employees. All equipment and uniforms are provided and some plainclothes positions are given a clothing stipend as well.

== Training ==
Bellevue Police have a training center that they share with the Bellevue Fire Department, located at 1838 116th Ave NE. New recruits train at the Criminal Justice Training Center in Burien. Those who pass the academy have in-service training for six months.

== Radio and dispatch ==
Bellevue Police is dispatched by NORCOM. They communicate using an 800 MHz trunked radio system called Eastside Public Safety Communications Agency (EPSCA).

Bellevue Police radio channels: NCPOL-1, NCTAC-1, etc...

== Relationship with other agencies ==
Both Bellevue School Security and Bellevue College Security are approved to talk on BPDs main radio channel, though BC security has their own channel they do most communicating on (not on the trunked system).

== See also ==
- List of law enforcement agencies in Washington (state)
- List of U.S. state and local law enforcement agencies
