= Kent Police Department =

Municipal police force in Washington, United States

- Abbreviation: KPD

Agency overview
- Formed: 1889
- Employees: 207
- Volunteers: 12
- Annual budget: $33,000,000

Jurisdictional structure
- Operations jurisdiction: Kent, Washington, United States
- General nature: Local civilian police

Operational structure
- Officer, Sergeant, Commander, Assistant Chief, Chiefs: 143
- Civilians: 57
- Agency executive: Rafael Padilla, Chief
- Special Units: List: Investigations; Patrol; Corrections
- Stations: 232 4th Ave S, Kent, WA 98032

Facilities
- Patrol cars: Chevrolet Tahoe PPV; Ford Police Interceptor Ford Police Intercepter(Utility); Dodge Charger Police

Website
- kentwa.gov/police

The Kent Police Department (KPD) is the municipal law enforcement agency of Kent, Washington, United States. The main police station is located in downtown Kent.

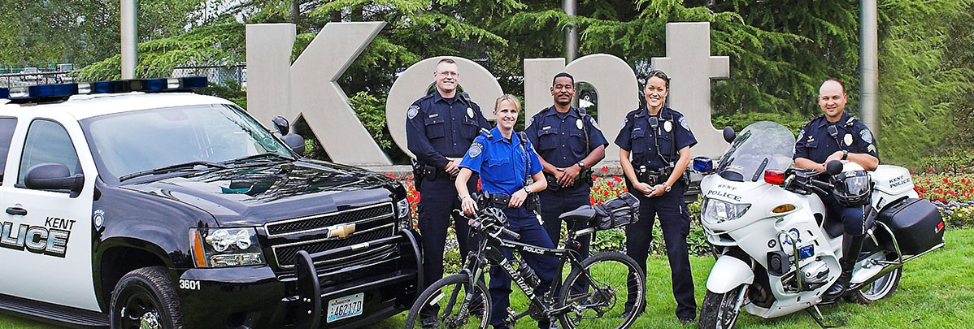

== Staff ==
The Kent Police Department staffing consists of 150 sworn personnel and 57 civilian personnel, as well as active Volunteer and Explorer programs. KPD is a state accredited law enforcement agency. Specialty assignments include: Civil Disturbance Unit, SWAT, Hostage Negotiator, K9, Persons/Property Detectives, Special Investigations Unit, Special Operations Unit (bikes and marine), Neighborhood Response Team, Traffic, Hiring Unit, Training Unit, and Field Training Officer. The Kent Police Department is constantly looking to hire qualified officers and civilians to serve the Kent Community. The mission of the Kent Police Department is to "Aggressively Fight Crime while Serving with Compassion".

The Kent Police Department averages about 90,000 dispatched calls and 17,000 case reports per year.

== Vehicles ==
The Kent Police Department currently uses the following vehicle types: Chevy Tahoe, Ford Police Interceptor, and Dodge Charger. In 2018 the Kent City Council approved the use of traffic enforcement funds to be used for the purchase of new Ford Police Interceptors, which will replace the Tahoes and allow nearly half of the sworn officers to take their vehicles home.

== Crime statistics ==
Type	2008	2009	2010	2011
Murders(per 100,000)	2 (2.4)	1 (1.2)	2 (2.3)	1 (1.1)
Rapes(per 100,000)	84 (98.9)	82 (97.2)	67 (78.1)	60 (63.9)
Robberies(per 100,000)	171 (201.3)	180 (213.4)	157 (183.1)	210 (223.7)
Assaults(per 100,000)	286 (336.6)	244 (289.2)	275 (320.6)	306 (326.0)
Burglaries(per 100,000)	1,112 (1,308.8)	828 (981.5)	1,018 (1,186.9)	1,223 (1,303.0)
Thefts(per 100,000)	2,702 (3,180.1)	2,381 (2,822.3)	2,665 (3,107.2)	2,977 (3,171.7)
Auto thefts(per 100,000)	835 (982.7)	611 (724.3)	781 (910.6)	789 (840.6)
Arson(per 100,000)	23 (27.1)	15 (17.8)	23 (26.8)	18 (19.2)
City-data.com crime index (higher means more crime; U.S. average = 299.9)	519.0	450.2	475.6	480.2

== Police chiefs since 1986 ==
- Rod Frederiksen, 1986-1991
- Ed Crawford, 1991-2006
- Steve Strachan (sheriff), 2006-2011
- Ken Thomas, 2011-2018
- Rafael Padilla, since 2018
