= Royal Malaysian Police Cooperative Limited =

Koperasi Polis Diraja Malaysia Berhad
- Founded: 24 April 1928; 98 years ago
- Headquarters: No.1, Jalan Sulaiman, 50000 Kuala Lumpur, Malaysia
- Key people: Hasanuddin Bin Hassan (Chairman)
- Revenue: ▼MYR 85 million (2021); MYR 90 million (2020)
- Net income: MYR 51 million (2021); MYR 5 million (2020)
- Total assets: ▼MYR 1.08 billion (2021); MYR 1.13 billion (2020)
- Website: kpdrm.com.my

Royal Malaysian Police Cooperative Limited (Malay: Koperasi Polis Diraja Malaysia Berhad; abbreviated: KPD), located in Kuala Lumpur, Malaysia, was established on 24 April 1928 to help reduce financial burden in the police department staff by forming a cooperative to provide business borrowing and lending. The conglomerate currently owns assets up to RM 720 million at book value.

== Service ==
KPD provides the following financial services:

- Personal loans
- Unsecured debt
- Mortgages
- Small holdings loans
- Vehicles loans
- Computer loans
- Group insurance

KPD allows its members to withdraw 80% of their savings for special purposes, such as land and house purchases, house renovation, medical expenses and Mecca pilgrimage travel expenses.

Primary, secondary and higher education scholarships are awarded to members' children who demonstrate excellent academic potential. The scholarships may be used locally or abroad. As of June 2010, KPD has around 95,000 members.

== Subsidiaries ==
The corps has owned the subsidiaries include:-

- Mantap Corp (KOP Mantap)
- K.L.I Hotel (Kuala Lumpur International Hotel)
- Travel & Tours Corp
- Construction Corps
- Property Maintenance Corps
- Security Agencies Corps
- Transport Corps
- Educator & Consultants Corps
- Aviation Corps

== List of chairpeople ==
- July 2007 to 24 June 2014 - Dato Mohd Amir Bin Sulaiman, Retired Commissioner Of Police
- 2006 to 2007 - Tan Sri Mohd Sedek Mohd Ali, Retired Deputy Inspector General of Police
- 2004 to 2006 - Dato Maizan Shaari, Retired Deputy Commissioner Of Police
