= Stride (bus rapid transit) =

Future bus network in the Seattle area

Overview
- Owner: Sound Transit
- Area served: Seattle metropolitan area
- Transit type: Bus rapid transit
- Number of lines: 3
- Number of stations: 25

Operation
- Operation will start: 2028 (S1 Line and S3 Line); 2029 (S2 Line)
- Number of vehicles: Articulated and double-decker buses
- Headway: 10–15 minutes

Technical
- System length: 46 miles (74 km)

Stride is a future bus rapid transit (BRT) service managed by Sound Transit in the Seattle metropolitan area of Washington in the United States. It is set to comprise three lines that cover 46 miles (74 km) and 25 stations on Interstate 405 (I-405) and State Route 522 (SR 522) in King and Snohomish counties. The system will primarily serve the Eastside region and is scheduled to open in 2028 and 2029.

The three BRT lines are planned to replace existing Sound Transit Express regional bus routes that were launched by Sound Transit between 1999 and 2002. A network of direct access ramps for these routes were constructed on I-405 to connect the existing high-occupancy vehicle lanes (HOV lanes) to new bus stations and flyer stops. Plans to upgrade the express buses into a BRT system emerged as part of long-range planning for the I-405 corridor in the 1990s and was included in Sound Transit plans the following decade.

Funding for the I-405 BRT lines, along with the addition of the SR 522 corridor, was part of the Sound Transit 3 ballot measure that was passed by voters in 2016. Construction began in 2024. The S1 and S2 lines on I-405 will use median stations in the freeway, accessed from the high-occupancy toll lanes (HOT lanes); the S3 Line will have conventional bus lanes and business access and transit lanes. Stride are planned to use battery electric buses on all three lines, served from a new maintenance facility in Bothell, and connect with Link light rail.

== History ==
=== Predecessors ===
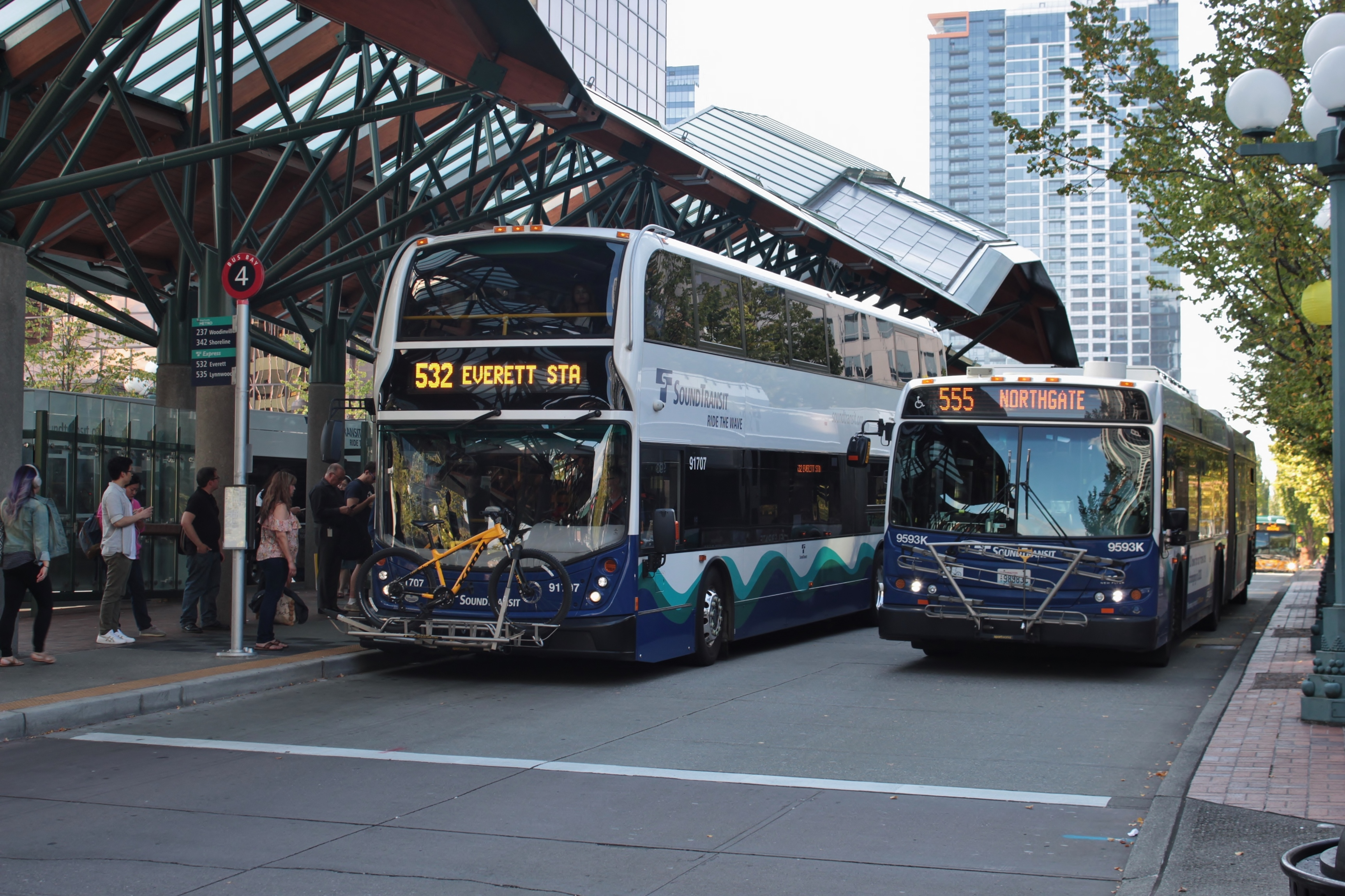
A double-decker bus on Sound Transit Express route 532 at Bellevue Transit Center

The Interstate 405 (I-405) and State Route 522 (SR 522) corridors are served by Sound Transit Express bus routes that were launched in the late 1990s and early 2000s by Sound Transit to provide service between regional hubs. They replaced earlier King County Metro (formerly Metro Transit) bus routes from as early as the 1970s to provide inter-suburban service and bypass Downtown Seattle, the hub of the regional transit network. The first of these was Route 240, an all-day suburban route which launched in 1973 and served a 40-mile (64 km) corridor from Burien to Bothell with intermediate stops at Seattle–Tacoma International Airport, Southcenter Mall, and Bellevue. An express variant, Route 340, connected several park-and-ride lots on I-405 and SR 518 between Burien and Shoreline; it was the longest route in the Metro system, taking three hours on a round trip.

The south half of I-405 is served by Route 560, which travels from the Westwood Village shopping center in West Seattle to Burien, Seattle–Tacoma International Airport, Renton, and Bellevue. It was launched by Sound Transit in September 2000 and originally continued north to West Seattle Junction until the route was cut in 2013. The north half of I-405, from Bellevue to Lynnwood, is served by Route 535; the route has stops in northern Kirkland and at the University of Washington Bothell campus. The corridor is also served by Route 532, which continues to Everett. Both routes were part of the original Sound Transit Express launch in September 1999; route 535 has all-day service on weekdays and Saturdays, while route 532 is peak-only.

The SR 522 corridor from Seattle to Kenmore, Bothell, and Woodinville is served by Sound Transit Express route 522, which launched in September 2002. It replaced an earlier route operated by King County Metro, who continue to run a direct route from Kenmore and Bothell to the University of Washington campus in Seattle. Route 522 originally continued into Downtown Seattle until it was truncated to coincide with the opening of Roosevelt station in 2021.

=== BRT proposals and studies ===
I-405 was originally built as a bypass around Seattle, but had become heavily congested during peak hours after the development of Eastside cities in the late 20th century. A set of high-occupancy vehicle lanes (HOV lanes) were constructed along its entire length from 1983 to 2002 to address congestion issues and encourage the use of carpools and public transit. The Regional Transit Authority (now Sound Transit) planned to construct direct-access ramps for the HOV lanes to improve bus service on the corridor, as the existing network of flyer stops required buses to weave in and out of the other lanes. The ramps were funded by the Sound Move ballot measure, which was approved by voters in 1996, and intended to be a precursor to a bus rapid transit (BRT) system.

The conversion of the HOV lanes on I-405 for transit-only use or the construction of an adjacent facility was proposed as early as 1990 by Metro Transit (now King County Metro). A commuter rail or light rail line using the existing Eastside Rail Corridor, a former freight line that runs parallel to I-405, was also considered in various plans. The state government convened a 19-member committee in 2001 to draft a long-range plan for the I-405 corridor that would be used to recommend projects in future legislative funding packages. Sound Transit, a stakeholder in the committee, solicited ideas for a bus rapid transit system with grade-separated busways. The state committee endorsed the addition of managed high-occupancy toll lanes (HOT lanes) lanes that would also be used by a bus rapid transit system with park-and-ride stops spaced 2 to 3 miles (3.2 to 4.8 km) apart.

A statewide referendum to fund transportation projects, including the first phases of the I-405 expansion and improvements, was rejected by Washington voters in 2002. The BRT project was bundled into the unfunded phase of the corridor's master plan, which would take an estimated 20 years to construct with additional funding sources. Sound Transit updated their long-range plan in 2005 to add several BRT corridors, including I-405 from Renton to Bothell, and a high-capacity transit option on SR 522 that would be either rail or bus-based rapid transit. Funding to plan and design the I-405 BRT line was included by Sound Transit in their portion of the 2007 Roads and Transit package, which was defeated by voters in the Seattle area. The I-405 planning study was retained in the separate Sound Transit 2 ballot measure, which was approved by voters in 2008. Cities on the north side of Lake Washington had also unsuccessfully requested funds to study transit options for the SR 522 corridor in the package.

Sound Transit updated its long-range plan in 2014 to prepare for a proposed third expansion package for the regional transit system. It included BRT on the I-405 corridor, which was also designated for potential rail expansion, and an unspecified form of high-capacity transit on SR 522 and between Bothell and Kirkland. A grassroots citizens' group named "522 Transit Now!" formed to lobby for the inclusion of a rapid transit line on the SR 522 corridor in the expansion package. In August 2015, Sound Transit revised the preliminary list of projects in the package to include BRT on SR 522 alongside I-405 and the Eastside Rail Corridor. BRT on the Eastside Rail Corridor was removed from consideration in 2016 due to protests from Kirkland residents who lived near the Cross Kirkland Corridor, a section of the rail line that had been converted to a bicycle and walking trail. The Eastside Rail Corridor was instead included as a study corridor for a potential future package.

=== Approval and planning ===
Funding for a 45-mile (72 km) BRT system on I-405 and SR 522 was included in the Sound Transit 3 package, a major ballot measure in 2016 to expand Sound Transit services across the region. The BRT element would cost an estimated $3 billion in year-of-expenditure dollars and include 2,100 total parking spaces at various park-and-ride lots. The earlier draft of the plan had only allocated $341 million towards a BRT program, which was protested by Eastside cities, especially Renton. The Sound Transit 3 package was passed by voters in November 2016 and the BRT lines were initially scheduled to open in 2024. The I-405 lines would be contingent on completion of HOT lanes on the south half of the corridor, which was originally scheduled to begin in 2019 and finish in 2024. The Bellevue–Lynnwood HOT lanes had opened in 2015.

The BRT system was named Stride in 2018 and given its own branding, which would be reflected in bus liveries and station designs. In 2020, the individual lines were given alphanumeric designations—with S as a prefix to the number—to differentiate from existing BRT services in the region that use either letters or colors. Stride lines will be colored gold on Sound Transit maps. The SR 522 line was originally planned to have some trips continue from Bothell to Woodinville until a separate Sound Transit Express route was proposed in 2020. Preliminary engineering and planning began in early 2018 with contracts awarded to WSP USA and David Evans and Associates. A set of business access and transit lanes on SR 522 began construction in 2019 and was completed in 2022 for use by the future Stride S3 Line.

In 2019, Washington State Department of Transportation (WSDOT) began construction of Renton–Bellevue HOT lanes on I-405, which includes a rebuilt interchange for the Stride S1 Line. Sound Transit completed environmental review for the S1 and S2 lines (on I-405) in September 2020 and the S3 Line (on SR 522) in March 2021. The program was delayed by several years due to a systemwide budget shortfall caused by the COVID-19 pandemic. In the 2021 realignment of the Sound Transit 3 program, the openings for the Stride lines was revised to 2026 and 2027, with park-and-ride projects delayed further to 2034 and 2044. Sound Transit adopted the final alignments and stations for the Stride lines in September 2021, along with the site of the proposed bus base.

=== Construction ===
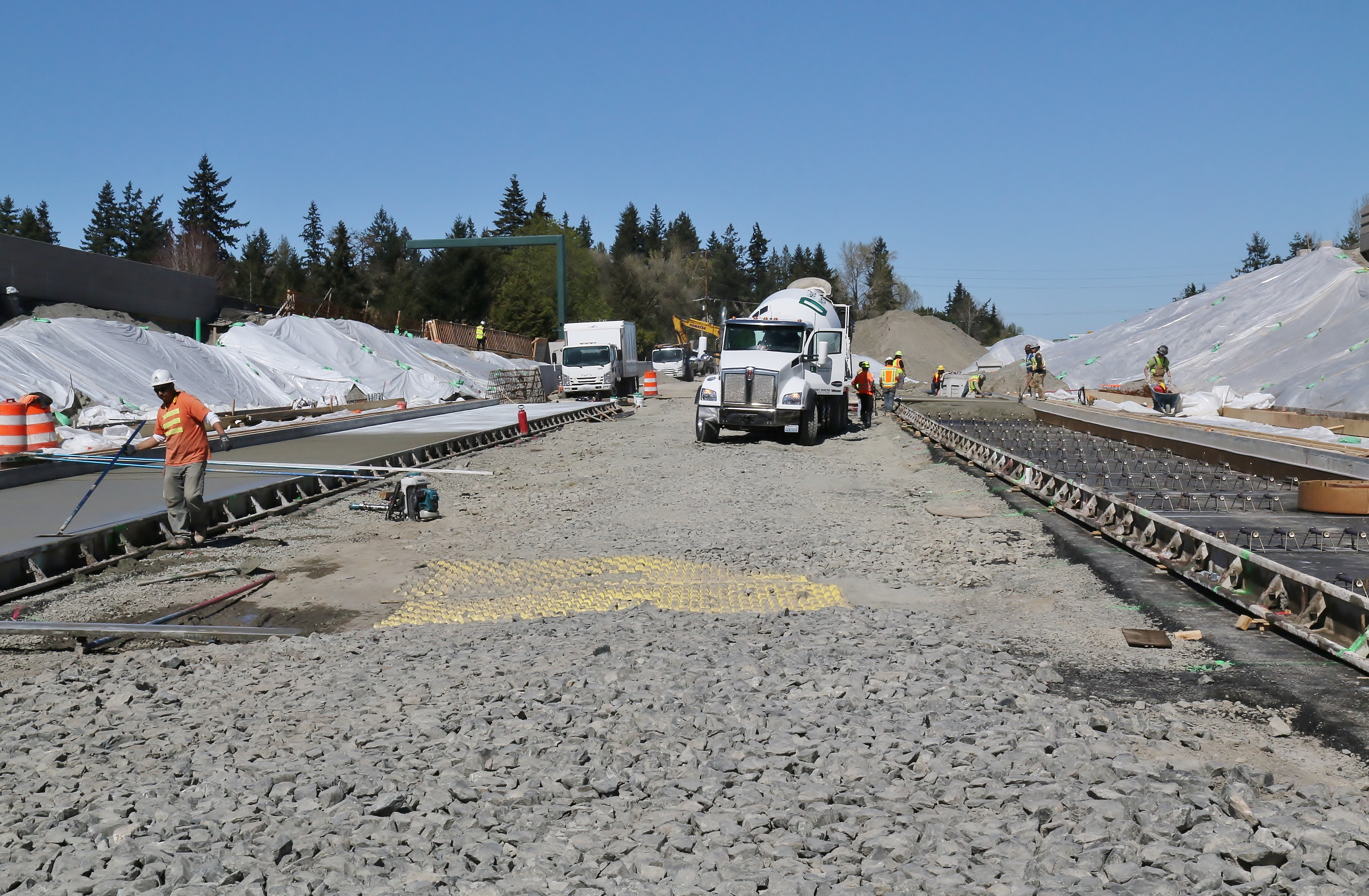
The future Kirkland/NE 85th station, under construction in April 2026

The $2.35 billion budget for the Stride program was approved by the Sound Transit Board in July 2023. The scheduled opening dates were delayed by another year due to increased project risks identified by Sound Transit. The first major project, the three-level Northeast 85th Street interchange and station in Kirkland, began construction in September 2023 and was opened to traffic in May 2026. It replaced an existing cloverleaf interchange east of downtown Kirkland with two roundabouts that segregate HOT lane traffic and will include stops for the intersecting RapidRide K Line.

Construction on other stations is began in 2025 with the Hoffman Construction Company as the general contractor for all Stride shelters and furnishings. Guy F. Atkinson Construction was awarded the contract to construct the station platforms and roadway improvements, including a queue jump lane in Bothell, for the S3 Line in August 2025. Another contractor, Pivetta Brothers Construction, was awarded the $27 million bid to construct stations on the S3 Line. The S3 Line project began construction in February 2026 and is scheduled to open in 2028. Work on the S2 Line stations at Lynnwood City Center and Canyon Park began in October 2026; the latter includes the demolition of an existing pedestrian bridge. The S1 Line on the south half of I-405 is also scheduled to open in 2028; the S2 Line on the north half of I-405 is scheduled to open in 2029. The Stride system is projected to carry 19,200 to 25,800 passengers on the I-405 corridor.

== Lines ==
Map of the planned Stride system

Stride is planned to have three lines that cover a total distance of 46 miles (74 km), primarily within the Eastside region in King County and part of neighboring Snohomish County. Buses are planned to operate for 19 hours a days on weekdays and Saturdays and for 17 hours on Sundays; frequencies would range from 10 minutes during peak hours to 15 minutes at other times. Connections to the Link light rail system are planned to be available on all three lines. The Stride lines are expected to have end-to-end travel times that average 20 minutes faster than existing express bus routes on those corridors.

The S1 Line serves the southern half of the Interstate 405 corridor as well as State Route 518. It begins in Burien and travels through three intermediate stations before reaching its terminus at Bellevue Transit Center. It is planned to replace Sound Transit Express route 560, which connects Bellevue to Seattle–Tacoma International Airport and White Center. The S1 Line is anticipated to take up to 42 minutes to complete an end-to-end trip.

The S2 Line serves the northern half of Interstate 405 from Bellevue to Lynnwood City Center station with five intermediate stations in Kirkland and Bothell. The line connects to the S1 Line at Bellevue Transit Center and to the S3 Line at a new hub near the University of Washington, Bothell, campus. It is planned to replace Sound Transit Express route 535 and anticipated to take up to 51 minutes from Bellevue to Lynnwood.

The S3 Line follows portions of State Route 523 and State Route 522 around the north side of Lake Washington from Shoreline South/148th station to Bothell. It is planned to stop at twelve intermediate stations in Seattle, Shoreline, Lake Forest Park, Kenmore, and Bothell. It is planned to replace Sound Transit Express route 522 and take up to 30 minutes from Shoreline to Bothell.

== Stations ==
Totem Lake Freeway Station, a future S2 Line stop, undergoing renovations for Stride

The system's 25 stations are planned to each have a raised platform for level boarding that is between 54 and 216 feet (16 and 66 m) in length. Each platform is planned to have large shelters that are up to 48 feet (15 m) long and decorated with glass panels on its windscreen that are designed by artists Angelina Villalobos (on the S1 and S2 lines) and Sonia Romero (on the S3 Line). Other features include off-board fare payment, ticket vending machines, and real-time information screens. The stations are planned to be shared with local buses operated by Community Transit and King County Metro. Several stations will also have park-and-ride facilities and storage for bicycles.

List of Stride stations
Station	Line(s)	City	Connections and notes
15th Ave NE	Stride S3 Line	Seattle / Shoreline	
30th Ave NE	Stride S3 Line	Seattle / Shoreline	
61st Ave NE	Stride S3 Line	Kenmore	
68th Ave NE	Stride S3 Line	Kenmore	
98th Ave NE	Stride S3 Line	Bothell	
104th Ave NE	Stride S3 Line	Bothell	
165th Street	Stride S3 Line	Lake Forest Park	
Ballinger Way	Stride S3 Line	Lake Forest Park	
Beardslee Blvd	Stride S3 Line	Bothell	
Bellevue Transit Center	Stride S1 Line Stride S2 Line	Bellevue	Link light rail: 2 Line
Bothell/Woodinville Transit Center	Stride S2 Line Stride S3 Line	Bothell	
Brickyard	Stride S2 Line	Kirkland	
Burien Transit Center	Stride S1 Line	Burien	
Canyon Park	Stride S2 Line	Bothell	
Kenmore Park & Ride	Stride S3 Line	Kenmore	
Kirkland/NE 85th	Stride S2 Line	Kirkland	
Lynnwood City Center	Stride S2 Line	Lynnwood	Link light rail: 1 Line, 2 Line
NE 153rd Street	Stride S3 Line	Lake Forest Park	
Renton/NE 44th	Stride S1 Line	Renton	
Renton Transit Center	Stride S1 Line	Renton	
Shoreline South/148th	Stride S3 Line	Shoreline	Link light rail: 1 Line, 2 Line
Totem Lake	Stride S2 Line	Kirkland	
Tukwila International Blvd	Stride S1 Line	Tukwila	Link light rail: 1 Line
UW Bothell/Cascadia College	Stride S3 Line	Bothell	

== Operations ==
Unlike Sound Transit Express, which is operated by local transit agencies, Stride will be contracted to private firm MV Transportation. The sole operations and maintenance facility for Stride is Bus Base North, located in the Canyon Park neighborhood of northern Bothell. The two-story maintenance building is planned to span 360,000 square feet (33,000 m^{2}) and include an operations and control center. The rest of the 10-acre (4.0 ha) campus will include a bus wash, charging stations, and a two-story parking garage. It has a listed capacity of 120 buses, which will include all Stride buses and some Sound Transit Express buses used in Snohomish County. The Canyon Park site was selected by Sound Transit in 2021 from a pool of thirty candidates. It began construction in August 2025 and is scheduled to open in late 2027 at a cost of $274 million.

== Fleet ==
Stride is planned to use a fleet of 48 battery electric buses with wireless inductive chargers embedded into the roadway at layover facilities. The inductive chargers, produced by InductEV, are able to deliver 300 kW of electricity; conventional 180kW plug-in chargers will be used at Bus Base North. The S1 and S2 lines on Interstate 405 will use 32 Enviro500EV electric double-decker buses produced by Alexander Dennis at a cost of $73.2 million. The buses have additional seating compared to a conventional model and are similar to double-deckers already used on the northern Interstate 405 corridor. The S3 Line will use 14 articulated buses due to its more frequent stops; the BYD RIDE K11M was selected for a $33.5 million contract in 2023.
