= Sound Transit 3 =

Transit referendum in the Seattle metropolitan area

- November 8, 2016
- Sound Transit (A Regional Transit Authority) Light-Rail, Commuter-Rail, and Bus Service Expansion Proposition No. 1

Results
Choice	Votes	%
Yes	717,116	54.05%
No	609,608	45.95%
Valid votes	1,326,724	92.19%
Invalid or blank votes	112,437	7.81%
Total votes	1,439,161	100.00%

Sound Transit 3, abbreviated as ST3, was a ballot measure during the November 2016 elections in the Seattle metropolitan area, proposing an expansion of the regional public transit system. The measure was proposed by Sound Transit, which was established by a similar initiative passed in 1996 and expanded by the Sound Transit 2 vote in 2008, who have operated regional transit systems in the Seattle metropolitan area since 1999. On November 8, 2016, Sound Transit 3 was approved by over 54 percent of voters in the Puget Sound region; voters in Pierce County rejected the measure, but the measure passed in King and Snohomish counties, and had an overall majority.

The $53.8 billion Sound Transit 3 plan will expand the existing Link light rail system to the suburbs of Tacoma, Federal Way, Everett and Issaquah, as well as the Seattle neighborhoods of Ballard and West Seattle. The local portion of the measure would be partially funded by increases in sales tax, motor vehicle excise tax, and property tax. The use of the motor vehicle tax, which included an older depreciation scale for vehicles, became a source of major controversy after the measure was passed.

The resulting transit network after the completion of Sound Transit 3 is planned to include 62 miles (100 km) of additional light rail serving 37 new stations; the entire 116-mile (187 km) light rail system would carry an estimated 600,000 daily passengers. A Sounder commuter rail extension to DuPont and bus rapid transit lines on State Route 522 and Interstate 405 are also part of the package. The package's projects are set to open in stages from 2024 to 2041, with light rail construction beginning in the late 2020s for most extensions.

== Background ==
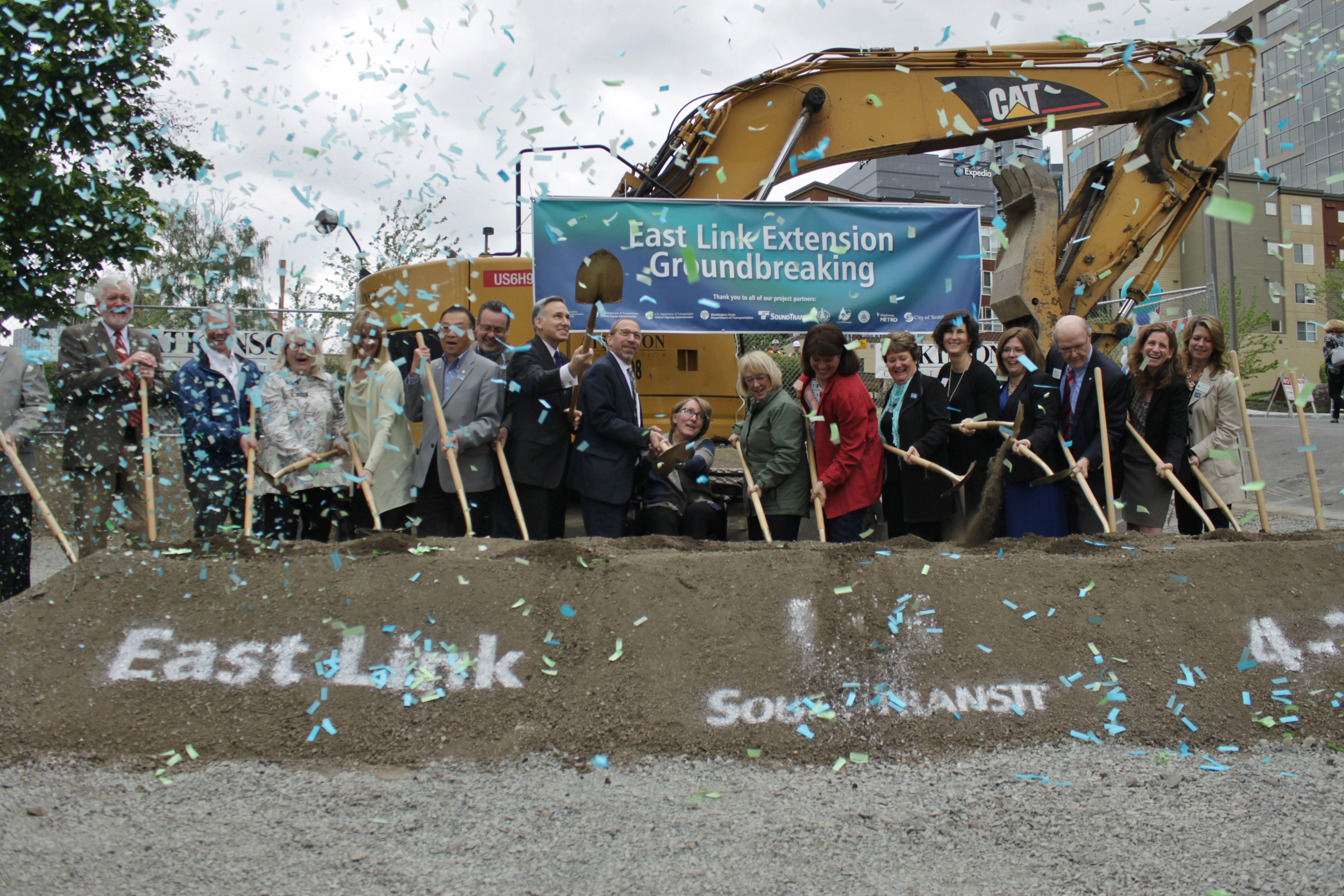
Groundbreaking of the East Link Extension, approved in 2008 by Sound Transit 2

Sound Transit, officially the Central Puget Sound Regional Transit Authority, was established in 1993 to build a regional mass transit system pending approval from voters. After an unsuccessful ballot measure in 1995, the "Sound Move" plan was approved on November 5, 1996, financing the construction and operation of a $3.9 billion light rail, commuter rail and express bus system. The services would begin service over the next decade, beginning with Sound Transit Express buses in 1999 and followed by Sounder commuter rail to Tacoma in 2000 and Everett in 2003. Light rail service came to Tacoma in 2003 and the centerpiece of the plan, Central Link from Downtown Seattle to Seattle–Tacoma International Airport, opened in 2009. The development of light rail was hindered by a funding crisis in the early 2000s, which forced the plan to be scaled back from 23 miles (37 km) to 16 miles (26 km), with planning for completion of the rest of the system. The final project funded by Sound Move, the University Link light rail extension, opened in 2016.

A second ballot measure, called Sound Transit 2, was proposed in 2007 to fund the deferred light rail segments left off the scaled-back system and further expand into the suburbs. It went to the ballot in November 2007 as part of a joint "Roads and Transit" measure proposing $47 billion in regional transportation projects, of which $30.8 billion would be used to build 50 miles (80 km) of light rail towards Lynnwood to the north, Redmond to the east, and Tacoma to the south. The proposition was rejected, with the opposition campaign led by environmentalists (including the Sierra Club and King County Executive Ron Sims) who were concerned about the 186 miles (299 km) of new highway lanes and ramps that would have been built by the plan. A standalone and scaled-back transit proposition was passed the following year, approving $17.9 billion for 34 miles (55 km) of light rail towards Lynnwood Transit Center, the Microsoft campus in southwestern Redmond, and northern Federal Way, as well as additional trips on Sounder.

During the implementation of Sound Transit 2, the effects of the Great Recession on sales tax revenue forced Sound Transit to scale back its projects in 2010. Light rail to Federal Way was truncated to South 200th Street in SeaTac, while the rest would be studied for a future expansion; East Link to Bellevue and Redmond was delayed to 2023 from 2021. The majority of Sound Transit 2's light rail projects are scheduled to be completed in the early 2020s, although Lynnwood Link and East Link were both delayed due to construction issues and increased costs.

== History ==
Planning for a third phase of transit expansion began in 2008 with $82 million in appropriated funding from Sound Transit 2 for "ST3 planning". Sound Transit identified several corridors to receive comprehensive planning studies, including Lynnwood to Everett, South Bellevue to Issaquah, Redmond to the University District via Kirkland, University District to Ballard to Downtown Seattle, Burien to West Seattle to Downtown Seattle, Burien to Renton, and bus rapid transit on Interstate 405. One of the studies, the Ballard–Downtown Seattle corridor, was made into a joint study with the city government of Seattle in 2013 that would investigate light rail as well as rapid streetcar concepts as part of the municipal streetcar network. Other high-capacity transit corridor studies and an updated long-range plan were approved by the Sound Transit Board in February 2013, as part of a requirement for a potential public vote for a next phase. The updated long-range plan, released in December 2014, recommended the addition of light rail extensions to Paine Field in Everett, West Seattle, Issaquah, and Tacoma Mall to the 2005 plan, which already included funded lines and light rail to Everett, Tacoma and Ballard.

Sound Transit presented a $15 billion transit package, named "Sound Transit 3", in October 2014, including light rail expansions to Everett, Tacoma, Issaquah, Ballard, and West Seattle. The following month, the Sound Transit Board unanimously voted to pursue new taxes to support the 2016 ballot measure, pending authorization from the Washington State Legislature. While the Republican-majority state senate attempted to the limit the package to a maximum of $11 billion, authorization for the full $15 billion revenue cap (for the first 15 years of collection) was passed in July 2015 as part of a statewide transportation package. As part of a compromise, a sales tax of 3.25 percent would be charged by the state on materials for construction projects, raising $518 million in revenue for the state highway funds that would be appropriated for other programs.

Drafting of the final plan began in June 2015, with the selection of projects to prioritize in subsequent planning phases after a series of public meetings. After receiving over 25,000 responses to a project questionnaire in July, the Sound Transit Board expanded the list of candidate projects to include light rail studies on previously excluded corridors, including State Route 522 (also the recipient of bus rapid transit service). In December, three package size options were presented to the Sound Transit Board: a 15-year, $26 billion program with at-grade lines between Ballard and West Seattle; a 20-year, $30 billion program with a new downtown tunnel for Ballard and West Seattle; and a 25-year, $48 billion program with a new downtown tunnel for Ballard.

A draft plan was released in March 2016, proposing a $50 billion, 25-year system with 108 miles (174 km) of light rail serving 75 stations, two bus rapid transit lines, and a commuter rail extension, all opening in stages from 2024 to 2041. Additional studies for provisional light rail lines between Ballard and the University District (via Fremont), West Seattle and Burien, and suburban extensions to Kirkland and North Everett. After the release of the draft plan, the long timelines were criticized from politicians and political groups that would receive service in the 2030s and 2040s. In response to the concerns over project timelines and routing choices, groups from Northwest Seattle and Snohomish County proposed alternative plans to better serve Interbay and Paine Field in Everett, respectively.

In May 2016, Sound Transit announced revised plans that would accelerate delivery dates for light rail projects, pushing most into the 2030s, using an additional $4 billion in bonds that would not affect the taxing rate. Another amendment proposed region-wide contributions to a new light rail tunnel in Downtown Seattle, which would be built to relieve the existing tunnel when it reaches its capacity with new suburban extensions. Infill stations along existing and future lines within Seattle were also added to the plan, along with a short light rail spur to southern Kirkland. The final plan was approved by the Sound Transit Board on June 23, and placed on the November ballot as Regional Proposition 1.

== Projects ==
Under full implementation of the Sound Transit 3 plan, the region's Link light rail system would expand to 116 miles (187 km), Sound Transit would operate two new bus rapid transit lines, and Sounder commuter rail would be extended by two stations while additional cars are added to trains. By 2040, Sound Transit estimates that its services will carry a total of between 561,000 and 695,000 daily riders, with 69 percent of all transit trips using rail services.

=== Light rail ===
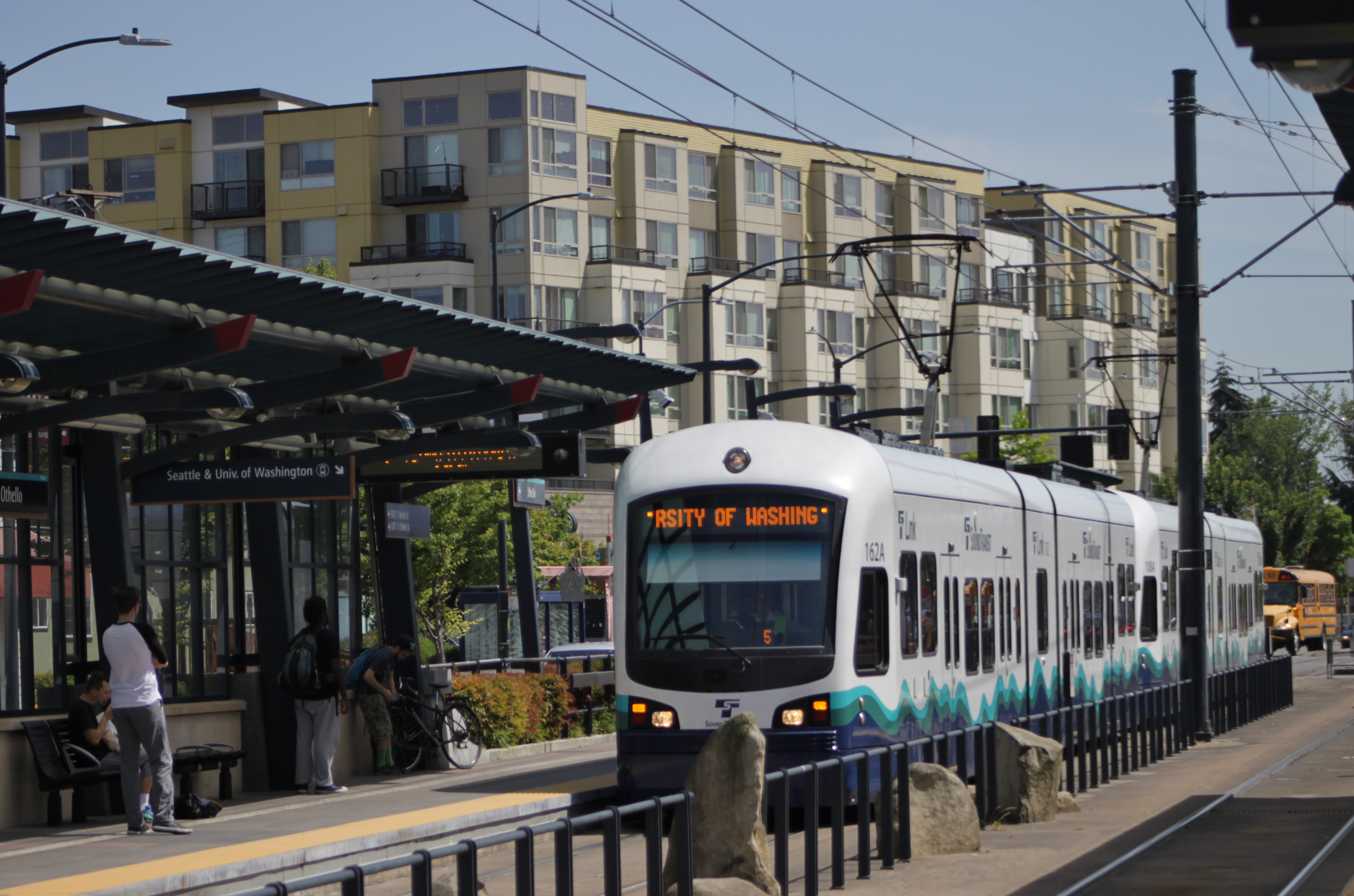
A light rail train at Othello station in the Rainier Valley of Seattle

Sound Transit 3 includes 62 miles (100 km) of light rail serving 37 stations, extending the existing system to suburban cities and the Seattle neighborhoods of Ballard and West Seattle. Light rail trains would run 20 hours per day, and every 3 to 6 minutes during peak hours; the plan requires the purchase of 226 new vehicles to operate on the new lines.

The light rail projects, in ascending order of projected completion, are:

- Downtown Redmond Link Extension: Redmond Technology station to Downtown Redmond (2024)
- Federal Way Link Extension: Kent/Des Moines station to Federal Way Transit Center (2024)
- Tacoma Dome Link Extension: Federal Way Transit Center to Tacoma Dome Station (2030)
- West Seattle Link Extension: Downtown Seattle to West Seattle (2030)
- Ballard Link Extension: Downtown Seattle to Ballard via South Lake Union and Lower Queen Anne (2035)
- Ballard Link Extension: Second downtown light rail tunnel (2035)
- Everett Link Extension: Lynnwood Transit Center to Everett Station via Paine Field (2036)
- South Kirkland–Issaquah Link Extension: South Kirkland to Issaquah via Bellevue (2041)

Construction on the Ballard, West Seattle, and Tacoma Dome extensions is scheduled to begin in the late 2020s, followed by work on the Everett and Issaquah projects. The plan also includes funding for infill stations on the original network, at Graham Street, NE 130th Street, and Boeing Access Road, to open by 2031. An extension of Tacoma Link to Tacoma Community College is projected to be completed in 2039.

=== Bus ===
Sound Transit 3 creates two bus rapid transit lines on Interstate 405 and State Route 518 from Burien to Lynnwood and State Route 522 and NE 145th Street from Shoreline to Woodinville, both originally scheduled to open in 2024. The system is named Stride and is scheduled to open in 2028 and 2029. One component of the I-405 project is a station at Northeast 85th Street in Kirkland, which is projected to cost up to $300 million due to extensive rebuilding of the existing interchange.

The plan also includes operating funds for the existing Sound Transit Express network, bus shoulder programs, bus reliability improvements, investment in three RapidRide lines in Seattle (C Line to West Seattle, D Line to Ballard, and Madison BRT to the Madison Valley) and investment in Pierce Transit's bus rapid transit project to replace Route 1 along Pacific Avenue in Tacoma.

=== Commuter rail ===
Sound Transit 3 would extend Sounder commuter rail service to Tillicum (near Joint Base Lewis–McChord) and DuPont from Lakewood station, to open in 2036. Additional capacity improvements (longer 10-car trains and potentially increased frequencies) on the South Line and additional parking on the North Line are also included in the plan.

=== Other elements ===
Sound Transit 3 includes funding for future system planning and high-capacity transit corridor studies for light rail and commuter rail extensions in all subareas. A transit-oriented development planning program would facilitate the transfer of surplus land and underutilized land near stations for development. Station access studies would also be funded, encouraging bicycle, pedestrian and ridesharing to and from the system. Over 8,500 new park and ride stalls are also included in the plan, largely in the suburban segments of the system.

== Funding ==
Sound Transit 3 would cost a total of $53.845 billion in 2041 dollars, using $27.7 billion in new local taxes raised during the 25-year construction phase. The new taxes would consist of a 0.5 percent sales tax, a 0.8 percent motor vehicle excise tax, and a property tax of 25 cents per $1,000 in assessed value. While the sales tax and motor vehicle excise tax were used in previous transit expansions, the property tax was added to create a "more progressive revenue source". Other funding sources include an estimated $4.7 billion in federal grants, surplus revenues from Sound Move and Sound Transit 2, bond proceeds, farebox recovery, and interest earnings. Sound Transit estimates that the plan would cost the average adult in the district approximately $169 more annually.

A portion of the plan would be funded through $11 billion in bonds, which would need repayment before taxes could be repealed. Estimates for full repayment and repeal ranged from 2048 to 2068, based on financial models from Sound Transit. In 2025, the state legislature passed a new law that allows Sound Transit to issue 75-year bonds, which would be needed under updated financial forecasts. Under the ST3 program, Sound Transit is expected to reach its state-imposed debt limit in the 2040s.

== Political support ==
=== Proponents ===
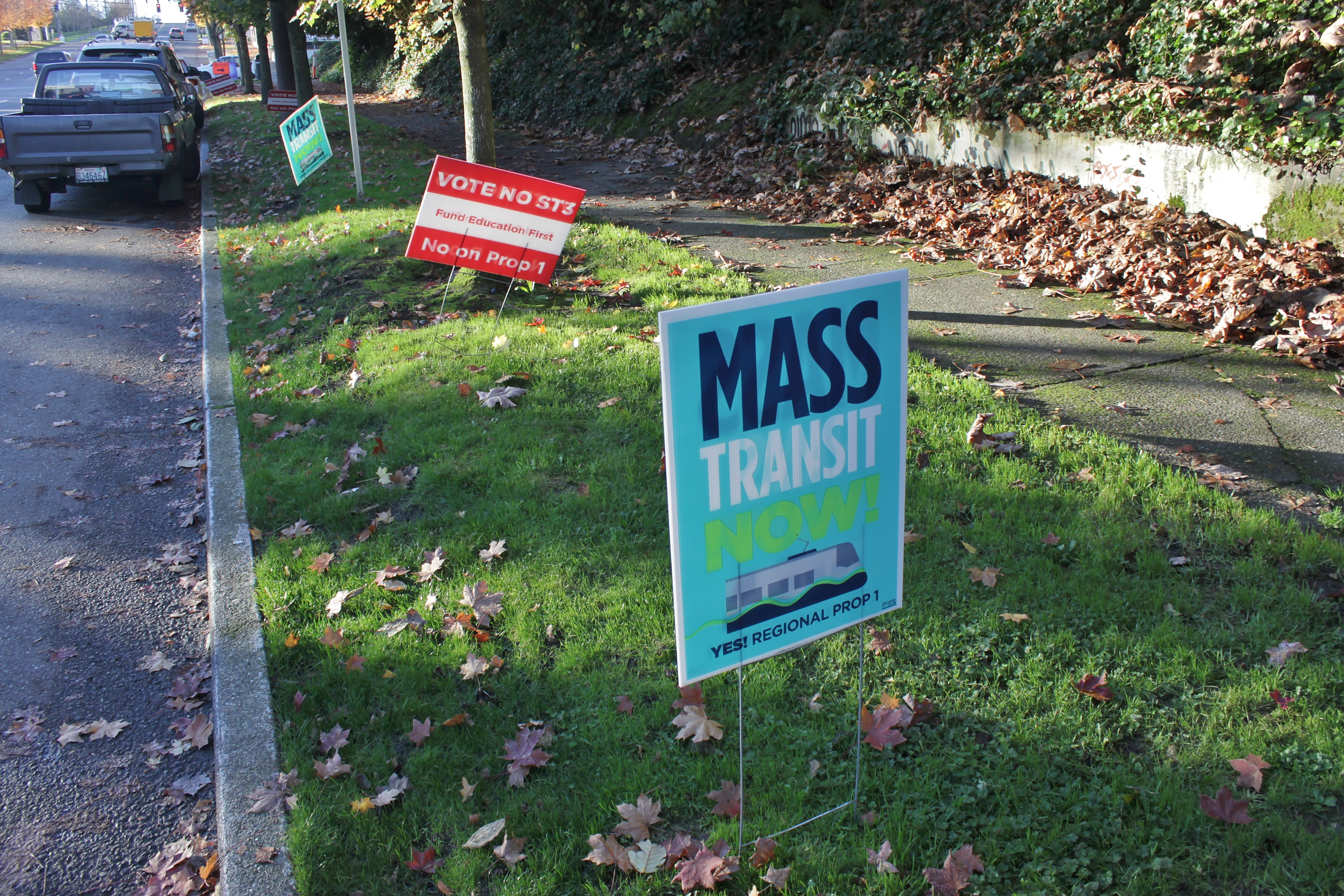
Campaign signs for the "yes" and "no" sides of Sound Transit 3, seen in West Seattle

The primary "yes" campaign, Mass Transit Now, was originally established to support Sound Transit 2 in 2008, and was revived for Sound Transit 3. Using funding from local corporations and labor unions, it raised $3.41 million by late October and attracted the support of politicians and political activists. The largest donors include Microsoft, Expedia, Amazon.com, Costco, and Vulcan Inc.; Bill Gates also donated $100,000 on behalf of the Bill and Melinda Gates Foundation, whose headquarters are in Seattle.

Sound Transit 3 was endorsed by prominent local politicians, including King County Executive and Sound Transit Board Chair Dow Constantine, Seattle mayor Ed Murray, state governor Jay Inslee, U.S. congressman Derek Kilmer, U.S. Senator Patty Murray, Snohomish County Executive Dave Somers, and Pierce County Executive Pat McCarthy. The measure was also supported by several city councils in northern and eastern King County in the summer of 2016, including Bellevue, Issaquah, Kenmore, Redmond, and Shoreline. Business groups in Seattle, including the Greater Seattle Business Association and Downtown Seattle Association, also voted to endorse the measure. Local non-profit and volunteer organizations also voted to support ST3, including the Seattle branch of the Sierra Club, OneAmerica, the Cascade Bicycle Club, El Centro de la Raza, AIA Seattle, Seattle Subway, Transit Riders Union and Feet First Washington. Uber endorsed the measure as well, citing shared goals of congestion and pollution reduction.

The News Tribune in Tacoma published an editorial on October 10 endorsing Sound Transit 3, citing its benefits to the city of Tacoma and Pierce County. Two weekly newspapers in Seattle, the Seattle Weekly and The Stranger, both endorsed Sound Transit 3 in their general election endorsements. The Herald in Everett published their endorsement on October 31, calling it an "investment, paying now for a greater benefit later".

In an op-ed to The Seattle Times, the county executives of King and Snohomish counties, along with the mayor of Tacoma, outlined their support for Sound Transit 3, citing existing traffic congestion and expected population growth in the region. Sierra Club executive director Michael Brune argued that the package's projects would provide great benefits to the environment and addition of affordable housing near stations.

=== Opponents ===
The Seattle Times editorial board rejected Sound Transit 3, asking readers to "demand a better plan". The city councils of Newcastle and Sammamish passed legislation in opposition to Sound Transit 3, citing the lack of benefits to their respective communities. State representative Reuven Carlyle of Ballard published an editorial opposing the measure over its cost, putting education funding in jeopardy because of the use of property taxes.

The "no" campaign had raised $316,000 by late October, largely financed by Bellevue developer Kemper Freeman. Freeman, who had long opposed rail transit and filed lawsuits in opposition to the East Link project funded by ST2, called the plan a "major calamity", criticizing the plan's timeline, cost, and scope. Bellevue city councilmember Kevin Wallace argued that a smaller plan to serve higher-density corridors with rail and others with bus rapid transit would be more cost effective. The Bellevue Chamber of Commerce voted to oppose the measure, citing a "lack of confidence" over the projected costs and benefits for projects after 2030.

== Criticism ==
Sound Transit 3 has been criticized by supporters and opponents for various elements of the plan. The editorial board of The Seattle Times criticized the plan in June 2016 as coming "too soon" and too costly, calling it a "blank check" to Sound Transit. The high cost of the plan, at $54 billion in year-of-expenditure dollars, was compared unfavorably to similar programs in peer cities. The plan has also been criticized for not promising to reduce congestion, with Sound Transit citing induced demand and touting light rail as an alternative rather than a solution.

After the release of the draft plan in March 2016, including completion of light rail to Everett and Tacoma in 2041 at the earliest, politicians demanded shorter timelines that were eventually implemented. The inclusion of $980 million to fund park and rides for stations was criticized by Seattle Met's Publicola, but was later reduced to $661 million and mitigated with plans to introduce reasonable fees for parking to manage demand, with revenues allocated to non-motorized system access.

=== Controversies ===
During the lead-up to the election, Sound Transit was criticized for adding misleading survey questions that were found by the state's public disclosure commission to be in violation of state laws, and later pulled. After the publication of the final plan and planning of the ballot measure language on voter pamphlets, a write-in campaign succeeded in placing conservative activist Tim Eyman on the committee writing the "no" statement, which upset the opposition campaign; under the state's ballot measure laws, Sound Transit's board were required to choose authors for both sides, and primarily selected current and former elected officials for both teams.

In August 2016, The Seattle Times revealed that 173,000 email addresses belonging to ORCA card holders were improperly released by Sound Transit to the pro campaign Mass Transit Now, potentially in violation of two state laws regarding protected information and use of public resources in support of a political campaign. The Washington State Attorney General's Office announced that it would not pursue legal action against Sound Transit for the incident, finding no evidence that the release was intentional.

== Results ==
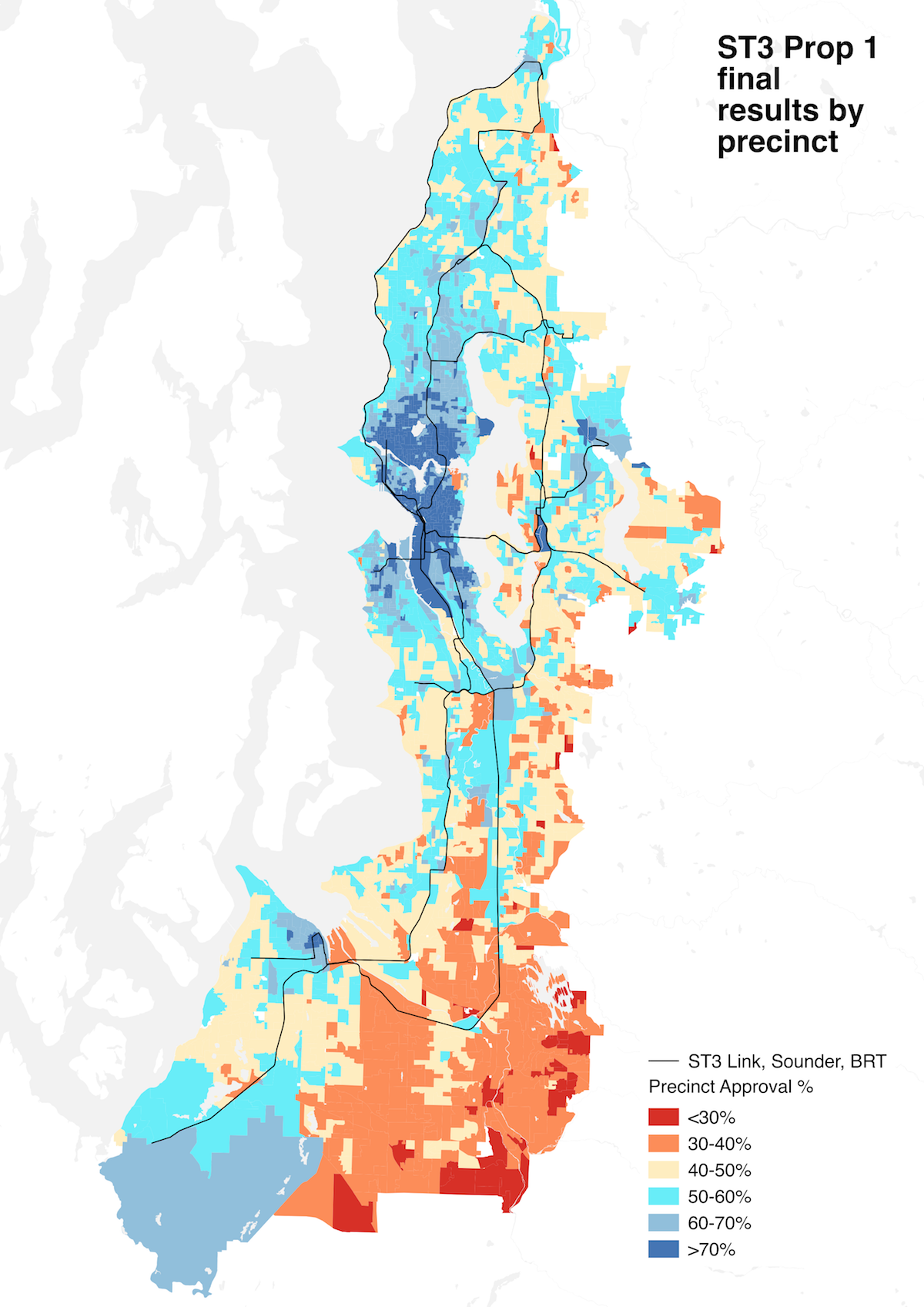
Map of Proposition 1 results by precinct

The initial election returns had Sound Transit 3 passing by a large margin in King County, narrowly in Snohomish County, and failing in Pierce County. Supporters, including King County Executive Dow Constantine and Seattle mayor Ed Murray, celebrated at a campaign party in Seattle's Belltown neighborhood. At a Republican Party gathering in Bellevue, Tim Eyman called the results a "gut punch". Ultimately, the ballot measure was approved by 54 percent of voters, with strong support in King County, narrow approval in Snohomish County, and rejection in Pierce County. Voter approval was very high in Seattle and in neighborhoods with apartments or near planned stations.

Regional Transportation Authority Proposition No. 1, November 8, 2016
Choice	Votes	%
For	717,116	54.05
Against	609,608	45.95
Required majority		50
Total	1,326,724	100.00
Source: King County Elections

=== By county ===
County	Yes votes	No votes	Yes (%)	No (%)	Total votes
King	496,018	360,451	57.91	42.09	829,469
Pierce	122,603	154,538	44.24	55.76	277,141
Snohomish	98,495	94,619	51.00	49.00	193,114
Total	717,116	609,608	54.05	45.95	1,326,724
Source: King County Elections

== Aftermath ==
Work on implementation of the program's elements began in the following days, with Sound Transit approving preliminary engineering on light rail extensions to downtown Redmond and Federal Way, which were deferred in 2010 and included in the package. Preliminary engineering work on the Ballard and West Seattle extensions was approved by Sound Transit in September 2017.

Sound Transit stated that project timelines could be accelerated with federal grants and streamlined permitting from local governments. Weeks after the vote, the agency applied to borrow $2 billion in federal funding, at a low interest rate, to help accelerate Sound Transit 2 projects and save capital costs for Sound Transit 3 projects further in the future. Sound Transit was given an upgraded bond credit rating, from Aa1/Aa2 to Aaa/Aa1, by Moody's Investors Service after the passage of the measure and successful issuance of federal bonds.

After the passage of Sound Transit 3, local transit advocacy group Seattle Subway proposed a second ballot measure to approve full bonding to finance an accelerated timeline for projects; the new ballot measure would require 60 percent of voters to approve, per the state's supermajority requirement for bonds and levies. The group lobbied for a state house bill in 2021 that would allow the city of Seattle to fund its own large-scale transit projects through a voter-approved referendum without seeking authority from the state legislature.

=== MVET controversy ===
The new motor vehicle excise tax (MVET; also known as "car tabs") took effect on March 1, 2017, raising the rate from 0.3 percent to 1.1 percent per $10,000 of a vehicle's depreciated value. The first reminders for car tab renewals were sent to vehicle owners in January, leading to "sticker shock" and public outcry. Much of the controversy focused on the formula used to calculate the value of a vehicle, which was adopted by the state legislature in 1990 and overvalued vehicles during their first ten years compared to a conventional Kelley Blue Book valuation. A revised formula was introduced in 2006, reducing the valuation of newer vehicles, but it was not implemented by the legislature during the 2015 session despite being introduced as a floor amendment in the State Senate. Under Sound Transit 3, the 1990 valuation would be used until the Sound Move excise tax expires in 2028 and be replaced by the newer valuation.

During the 2017 session, House Republicans attempted to move legislation allowing cities to exempt themselves from the Sound Transit district onto the floor, but were blocked by the Democratic majority, who were seeking to use their own MVET reform proposal. The Senate Law and Justice Committee conducted an investigation into the legislature's passing of taxing authority, with Republican members concluding that it had been unconstitutional and included misleading statements. The investigation was dismissed by Sound Transit as a "partisan endeavor" and criticized by Democratic members of the committee over its secrecy and timing weeks before a special State Senate election. Anti-tax activist Tim Eyman attempted to file an initiative to cap the car tab fee at $30, but failed to collect the minimum number of signatures required for the November 2018 ballot.

The Democrats, with a majority in both houses of the state legislature, re-introduced their own MVET reduction proposal during the 2018 legislative session. Sound Transit estimated that the bill would reduce revenue by $780 million over the next 11 years, and also introduce indirect impacts to debt costs and project delivery schedules. The bill was passed by the State House in late January. To mitigate the financial impact, the Senate Transportation Committee proposed a $518 million exemption from sales taxes that would have been paid by Sound Transit into the education fund. The Senate bill was passed on March 1, but the House were reluctant to agree to a reduction in education funding. Negotiations broke down and the session ended on March 8 without the bill passing.

In June 2018, a class-action lawsuit against Sound Transit was filed in the Pierce County Superior Court by seven residents, alleging that Sound Transit 3 was unconstitutional due to its use of the old formula. The lawsuit was promoted by state senator Phil Fortunato, a Republican from Auburn who claimed to have organized the case, but the case's lead attorney said that his involvement was exaggerated for the sake of his re-election campaign.

Tim Eyman filed Initiative 976 (I-976) to limit MVET fees to $30 statewide, in part as a response to the passage of Sound Transit 3. It was placed on the November 2019 ballot and was passed by 53 percent of voters, but its legality has been disputed; the King County Superior Court issued an injunction a few weeks after the election that halted implementation of the new MVET scheme. I-976 would have an estimated impact of $1.9 billion in lost revenue for the program. In October 2020, I-976 was struck down by the Washington State Supreme Court on constitutional grounds.

=== Funding issues ===
The economic disruption following the 2020 COVID-19 pandemic is projected to cause $8 billion to $12 billion in lost tax revenue for Sound Transit through the end of the ST3 program in 2041. In June 2020, the Sound Transit Board called for an agency realignment program to prioritize projects in the ST3 package while deferring others. In January 2021, Sound Transit estimated that the program had a $11.5 billion funding shortfall for ST3 projects due to various factors, including $6 billion attributed to lost tax revenue due to the pandemic recession. Property acquisition and additions to project scope at the request of community groups were also named as contributing factors to the shortfall.

On August 5, 2021, the Sound Transit Board approved a realignment plan for ST3 projects, delaying most projects to save costs and account for the halt in environmental review during the pandemic. Under the realignment plan, most light rail extensions would be delayed four to five years, while additional Sounder trips on the South Line would be delayed to 2046. Several projects were also split, with temporary termini for the Ballard and Everett light rail extensions added to accelerate service for some areas.

On May 28, 2026, the Sound Transit Board adopted updates to the ST3 system plan to address a $34.5 billion funding gap over the next 20 years.

== See also ==
- Roads and Transit
- Sound Transit 2
