= Washington State Route 522 =

State highway in Washington, US

State Route 522
- SR 522 highlighted in red

Route information
- Auxiliary route of I-5
- Maintained by WSDOT
- Length: 24.64 mi (39.65 km)
- Existed: 1964–present

Major junctions
- West end: I-5 in Seattle
- SR 104 in Lake Forest Park; I-405 in Bothell; SR 9 near Woodinville
- East end: US 2 in Monroe

Location
- Country: United States
- State: Washington
- Counties: King, Snohomish

Highway system
- State highways in Washington; Interstate; US; State; Scenic; Pre-1964; 1964 renumbering; Former
← SR 520	→ SR 523

State Route 522 (SR 522) is a state highway in the U.S. state of Washington that serves the Seattle metropolitan area. Approximately 25 miles (40 km) long, it connects the city of Seattle to the northeastern suburbs of Kenmore, Bothell, Woodinville, and Monroe. Its western half is primarily an arterial street, named Lake City Way and Bothell Way, that follows the northern shore of Lake Washington; the eastern half is a grade-separated freeway that runs between Woodinville and Monroe. SR 522 connects several of the metropolitan area's major highways, including Interstate 5 (I-5), I-405, SR 9, and U.S. Route 2 (US 2).

The present-day route of SR 522 was built in stages between 1907 and 1965, beginning with the Red Brick Road from Seattle to Bothell, then part of the Pacific Highway and later US 99. The road later became a branch of Primary State Highway 2 (PSH 2) in 1937, and was extended east to Redmond and North Bend. A branch of the Stevens Pass Highway was built to connect PSH 2 in Bothell and Monroe in 1965, and was incorporated into SR 202 after it was designated in 1964. The Bothell–Monroe highway was re-designated as part of SR 522 in 1970, leaving SR 202 on the Bothell–North Bend highway.

Since the late 1990s, the SR 522 corridor between Woodinville and Monroe has been partially converted to a freeway to address safety concerns and a growing population. Portions of the highway near Woodinville and Monroe were widened between 2001 and 2014, while other sections near Maltby remain two lanes wide and undivided, with improvement projects left unfunded.

== Route description ==
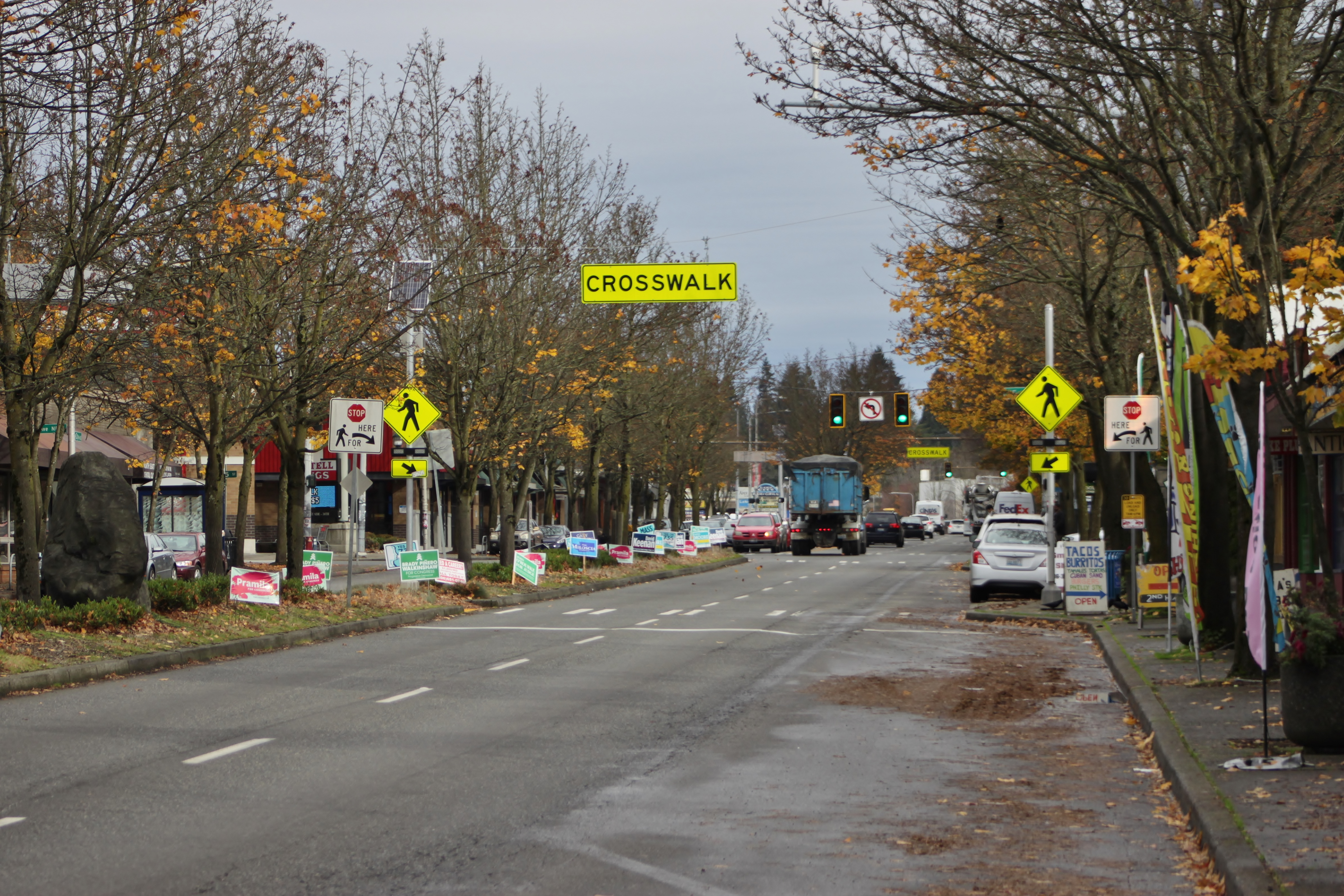
Lake City Way (SR 522) northbound in the commercial district of Lake City in Seattle

SR 522, named Lake City Way within Seattle city limits, begins at an interchange with I-5 in the Roosevelt neighborhood of northern Seattle, east of Green Lake. The interchange only allows movements south towards Downtown Seattle on I-5, and includes a connection to the freeway's reversible express lane system. The highway travels northeast from the interchange, tunneling under the intersection of Roosevelt Way NE and NE 75th Street; the intersection itself is connected to SR 522 by a series of ramps to collector streets. Lake City Way continues northeast through Maple Leaf as a four-lane arterial street before turning north on its approach to Thornton Creek. After crossing the creek, the highway enters the Lake City neighborhood, passing several car dealerships. Lake City itself is a designated urban village, with mixed-use development and apartment buildings that are centered around the intersection of Lake City Way between NE 125th Street and NE 145th Street. At NE 145th Street, SR 522 intersects SR 523 and crosses into Lake Forest Park.

Beyond Seattle, the highway is named Bothell Way and follows the northern shore of Lake Washington. SR 522 intersects Ballinger Way (SR 104) at the central shopping center in Lake Forest Park, and is joined by the Burke-Gilman Trail, a multi-use trail running along the lakefront on a former railroad grade. Bothell Way continues east along the northern shore of Lake Washington through the city of Kenmore, located on the mouth of the Sammamish River and home to the Kenmore Air Harbor seaplane base. SR 522 travels upriver through a narrow valley that makes a sharp turn north towards Bothell. The highway turns east and continues downhill of the city's downtown business district, staying near the Sammamish River (and the Sammamish River Trail) and intersecting Bothell Way (formerly SR 527). Leaving Bothell, SR 522 then travels around the southern edge of University of Washington Bothell and Cascadia College campus and intersects I-405, becoming a grade-separated freeway.

East of I-405, SR 522 enters Woodinville and follows Little Bear Creek as it turns north away from the city's downtown, intersecting SR 202. The freeway enters Snohomish County and intersects SR 9 south of the Brightwater sewage treatment plant. It continues through several sharp turns that follow the Eastside Rail Corridor, a former railroad grade that runs northeasterly through the predominantly rural area near Grace. In Maltby, the freeway reaches an at-grade intersection with Paradise Lake Road (SR 524) and becomes a two-lane undivided highway. SR 522 travels northeast from Maltby, intersecting Echo Lake Road in a single-point urban interchange, and crosses the Snohomish River into Monroe. Within Monroe, the highway widens to a four-lane freeway with median separation and intersects Main Street in a dogbone interchange near the Monroe Correctional Complex. SR 522 cuts across suburban housing areas in Monroe, and crosses over US 2 and the BNSF Railway near the Evergreen State Fairgrounds. The highway makes a 180-degree turn south to intersect with US 2, where it terminates; the intersection also has a direct offramp for eastbound traffic from SR 522 to eastbound US 2.

The entire route of SR 522 is designated as part of the National Highway System, classifying it as important to the national economy, defense, and mobility. The State of Washington also designates the SR 522 corridor as a Highway of Statewide Significance, which includes highways that connect major communities throughout the state. The highway is the primary route for Seattle-area residents to access Stevens Pass and other parts of the Cascade Mountains. SR 522 is maintained by the Washington State Department of Transportation (WSDOT), which conducts an annual survey on the state's highways to measure traffic volume in terms of annual average daily traffic. In 2016, WSDOT calculated that 96,000 vehicles used SR 522 at its interchange with I-405 and 12,000 vehicles used it at its eastern terminus in Monroe, the highest and lowest counts along the highway, respectively.

== History ==
=== Red Brick Road ===
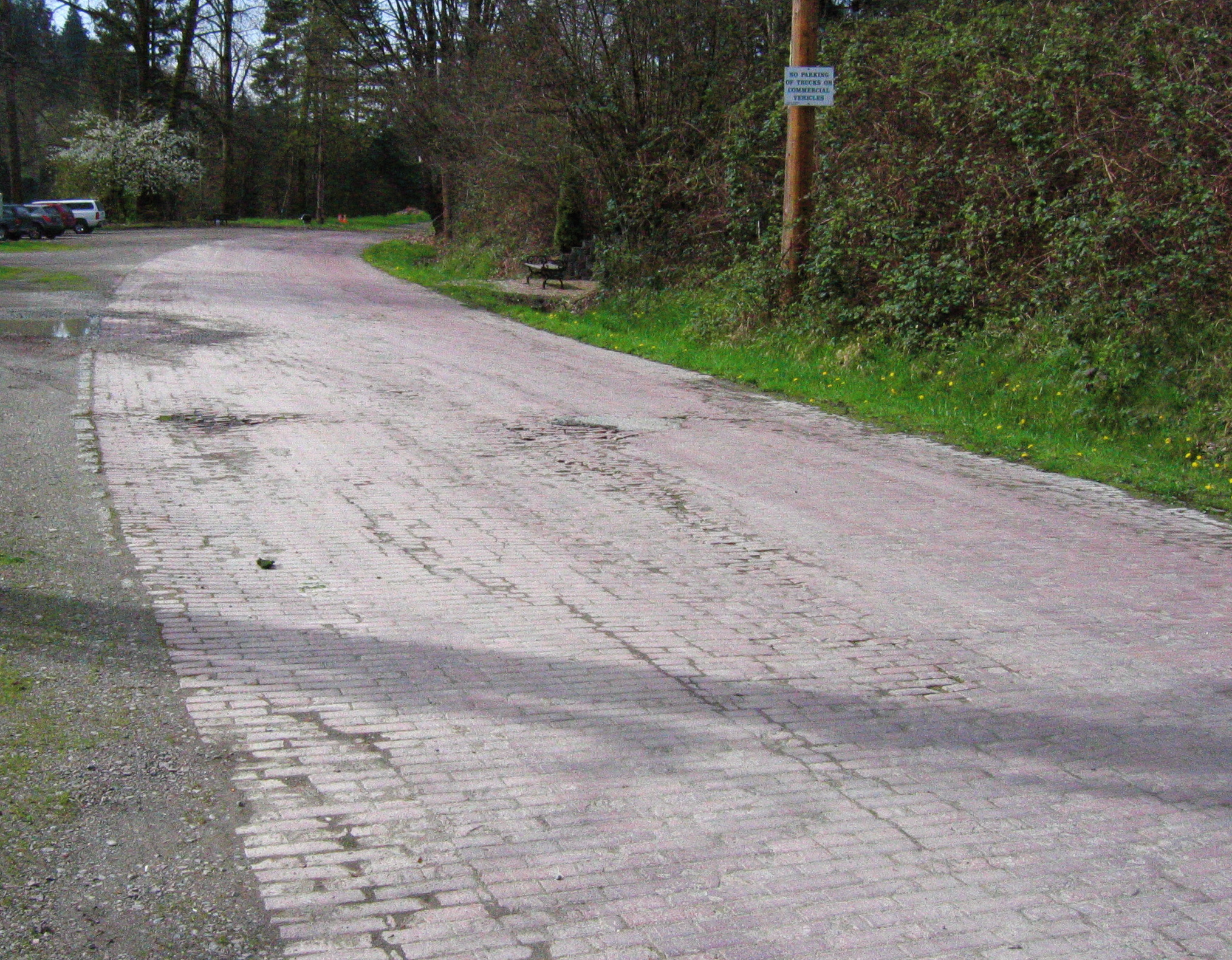
A preserved segment of the Red Brick Road in Bothell, originally opened in 1914

Logging settlements were established on the northern shore of Lake Washington in the 1860s and 1870s, relying primarily on the water for intercity transportation. The Seattle, Lake Shore and Eastern Railway was built along the lakefront in 1888, connecting Seattle to the new towns of Bothell and Kenmore. By the 1890s, unpaved logging trails had been completed along Lake Washington and the railroad, reaching as far northeast as Maltby.

Bothell businessman and good roads advocate Gerhard Ericksen successfully lobbied the Washington State Legislature to fund the construction of a road from Seattle to Bothell as a State Aid Road and Permanent Highway in 1903. The first section of the highway, traveling 7 miles (11.3 km) from Ravenna Park in Seattle to Lake Forest Park, was completed in 1907 and was pronounced by The Seattle Times as one of the "finest pieces of road to be found anywhere in the United States". From 1911 to 1913, the state and county government paved 4 miles (6.4 km) of the highway between Lake Forest Park and Bothell with bricks. The highway, named the Ericksen Road after its promoter and Bothell Road after the city of Bothell, was opened on January 10, 1914, in an event named the "Boulevard Blowout" that featured 50 automobiles traversing the entire route between Seattle and Bothell. Most of the brick road was replaced in 1934, but a section south of downtown Bothell was preserved and remains known as Red Brick Road Park.

=== Federal and state highways ===
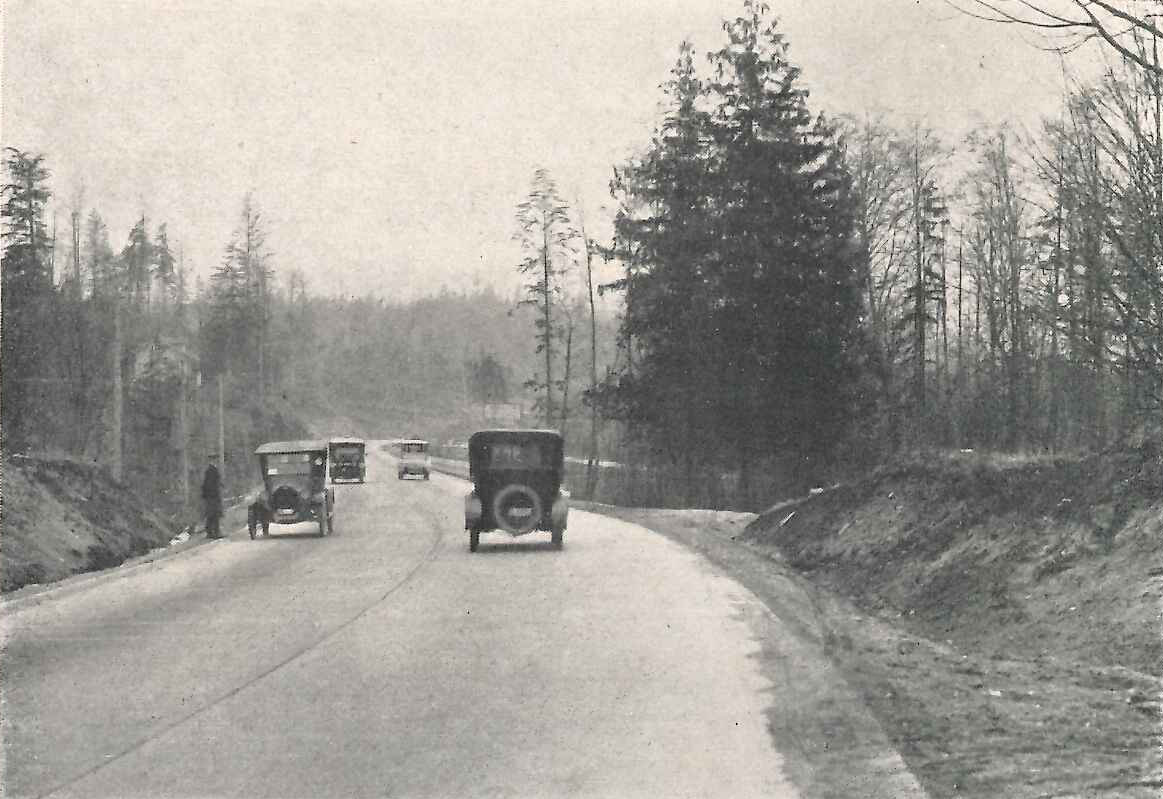
A section of Victory Way in Seattle, 1923

The Bothell Road became part of the Pacific Highway in 1915, forming part of the highway that would continue north from Bothell towards Everett. In 1922, the original road alignment through modern-day Lake City was bypassed by the new, concrete-paved Victory Way, dedicated in the memory of World War I veterans. The Pacific Highway was incorporated into a new national highway system that was approved by the American Association of State Highway Officials on November 11, 1926, and numbered as US 99. On October 15, 1927, the North Trunk Highway was opened between Seattle and Everett, providing a shorter and more direct route that would later be designated as US 99 and the Pacific Highway. The Bothell Highway was renovated from Seattle to Lake Forest Park in 1939, including a widening to four lanes and straightening of some segments. Part of the highway in Seattle city limits was renamed to Lake City Way in 1967, after lobbying from Lake City businessmen.

An unpaved extension of the Bothell Road, traveling along the Sammamish River to Woodinville, Redmond, and Fall City, was designated as a branch of the Sunset Highway (State Road 2) in 1925. The highway was later paved and incorporated into a longer branch of the Sunset Highway (re-designated as Primary State Highway 2) in 1937, running from Downtown Seattle to Fall City. The branch highway was extended to North Bend after the opening of a Sunset Highway bypass in 1941, using the former mainline road.

Another branch of the Bothell Road, from Bothell to the Stevens Pass Highway (Primary State Highway 15) in Monroe, was proposed by the state good roads association in the late 1930s. In 1941, funding for this segment was rejected by the state senate, in favor of completing the highway between Everett and Monroe first. The Bothell–Monroe Cutoff was designated as a branch of Primary State Highway 15 in 1943, with a provision that the highway would be constructed after the completion of the Everett–Monroe route. The King County government also unsuccessfully lobbied in the early 1950s for a 23-mile (37 km) highway connecting Duvall to Skykomish along the Tolt River as an alternative to the Monroe cutoff. Construction of the highway was pushed back to 1961, and it was further delayed by rainy weather. The 8.2-mile-long (13.2 km) Bothell–Monroe Cutoff opened on February 10, 1965, costing $5.3 million (equivalent to $40 million in 2024 dollars) and cutting 20 minutes in travel time between Seattle and the Stevens Pass ski area.

In 1963, the state legislature commissioned a new state highway numbering system to ease confusion over similarly numbered routes. The new system debuted in 1964, initially with State Route 522 (SR 522) assigned to the branch of Primary State Highway 2 from Seattle to North Bend, and State Route 202 (SR 202) assigned to the branch of Primary State Highway 15 from Woodinville to Monroe. By 1970, SR 522 had been moved to the Bothell–Monroe Cutoff, while SR 202 was moved to the Woodinville–North Bend highway.

=== Freeway expansion and safety improvements ===
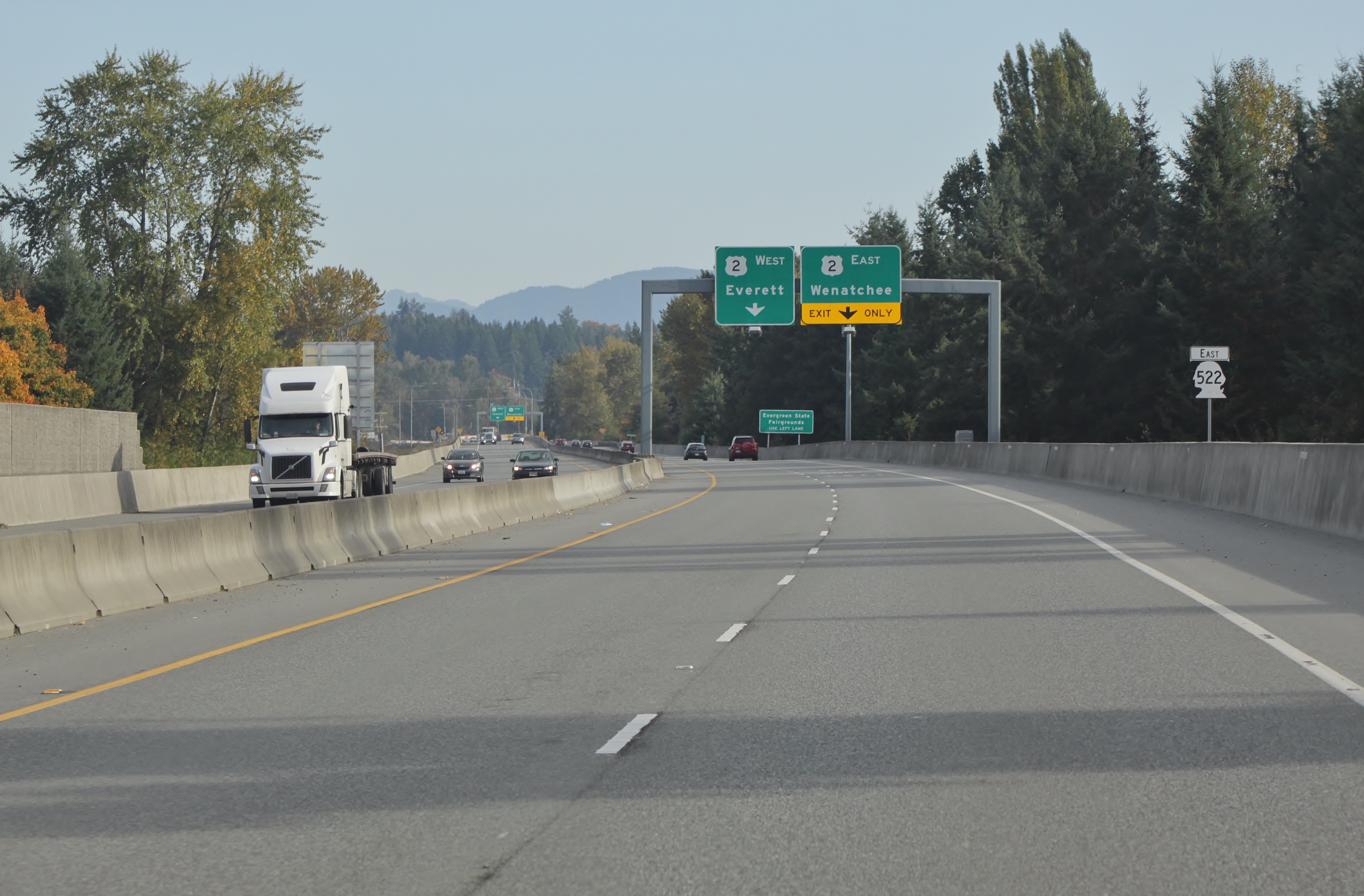
A freeway section of SR 522 in Monroe constructed in 1972

The North Seattle section of the Everett–Seattle Freeway (now I-5) opened on August 28, 1963, including access to Bothell Way in the Roosevelt neighborhood. SR 522 was truncated to I-5, removing Roosevelt Way and Eastlake Avenue from the state highway system. A four-level freeway interchange with I-405 east of Bothell was completed in 1969, creating a connection between SR 522 and SR 202.

In 1968, the state highway department proposed the conversion of SR 522 into a freeway bypassing Lake City Way and Bothell Way. The plan drew heavy opposition from local residents, who feared bottlenecks and a reduction in quality of life, and was abandoned by the Washington State Highway Commission in 1970 before being dropped from regional plans in 1973. A shorter bypass of Lake City was proposed in 1975 but drew criticism at public hearings and was dropped. Freeway plans in Monroe moved forward instead, with the completion of a two-mile-long (3.2 km) bypass to the west of downtown in 1972. SR 522 was moved from its routing on Main Street to the new freeway, which terminated at US 2 and removed a railroad grade crossing from the route.

Since the 1980s, population growth in Monroe and around the SR 522 has resulted in increased traffic congestion and safety issues, including a rise in accidents and crashes. The highway was originally designed for eventual conversion into a four-lane freeway, with leftover right-of-way and bridge approaches built in 1965. Between 1980 and 1995, the 10.5-mile-long (16.9 km) stretch of SR 522 between Woodinville and Monroe was the site of over 1,100 accidents and 40 deaths. SR 522 has been named as one of the most dangerous highways in the United States by Reader's Digest in 1995 and Forbes in 2007, among other lists. The rock band "State Route 522" formed in 1995 by local indie rock musician Jake Snider was named for the highway.

In response to the crashes on SR 522, local residents organized a grassroots campaign (named "Citizens Rallying for a Safer Highway") to petition the state for safety improvements and a highway widening. In 1993, the state legislature allocated $180 million (equivalent to $352 million in 2024 dollars) in funding towards a five-stage widening project, but the funds were transferred to the general fund at the behest of Governor Mike Lowry. The 1994 supplemental transportation budget included $2 million for engineering studies on SR 522, with construction of a four-lane freeway funded through other means. State lawmakers recommended tolling SR 522 to pay off construction bonds, but the plan was shelved after opposition from local residents.

Existing state funds were used for the first stages of the SR 522 corridor project, including the addition of median rumble strips and improved pavement markers in 1995, which helped reduce head-on collisions. The city of Monroe replaced the eastern half of SR 522's interchange with Main Street (164th Street Southeast) with a roundabout, the first to be built in Snohomish County, in 2001. The first stage of the corridor project, completed in 2001, widened a section between SR 9 and Paradise Lake Road (SR 524) in Maltby at a cost of $22 million. At the time, the state government estimated that it would cost $82 million (equivalent to $138 million in 2024 dollars) to widen the remaining sections of SR 522; the projects had been prioritized under a 1998 ballot initiative, but funding was cut by Washington Initiative 695.

The second stage, a new single-point urban interchange at Echo Lake Road southwest of Monroe, was completed in 2006 at a cost of $37 million. The third stage of the SR 522 corridor project was completed in 2014, widening the highway to four lanes across the Snohomish River and through Monroe to US 2, where a new eastbound offramp was also constructed separately in 2012. A new roundabout at the 164th Street Southeast interchange was also opened as part of the project, completing the dogbone interchange. A separate project to build a new intersection with flyover ramps at the south end of the University of Washington Bothell campus was completed in 2009 at a cost of $52.3 million. A 3/4-mile (1.2 km) section of SR 522 in Downtown Bothell was rebuilt in 2013 to improve safety and eliminate a hazardous intersection.

The remaining stages of the SR 522 corridor project between Maltby and the Snohomish River were planned to be funded by the Roads and Transit ballot measure in 2007, before it was rejected by local voters. The 2015 state transportation package included $10 million in design funding for an interchange at Paradise Lake Road in Maltby, to be made available in 2025, but construction of the interchange and widening of the remaining segment remains unfunded. The preliminary design options for the future diamond interchange would place the main ramps at either SR 524 or Paradise Lake Road. A coalition of politician and business leaders named "Finish522" was formed in 2018 to lobby the state government for barriers and complete grade separation in the wake of several fatal crashes in the mid-2010s. Long-term plans from WSDOT to address increasing traffic congestion in downtown Monroe include the construction of a highway bypass for US 2 to the north of the city. The project would include a northern extension of SR 522 to intersect the realigned US 2 near Kelsey Street and Chain Lake Road.

=== Mass transit ===
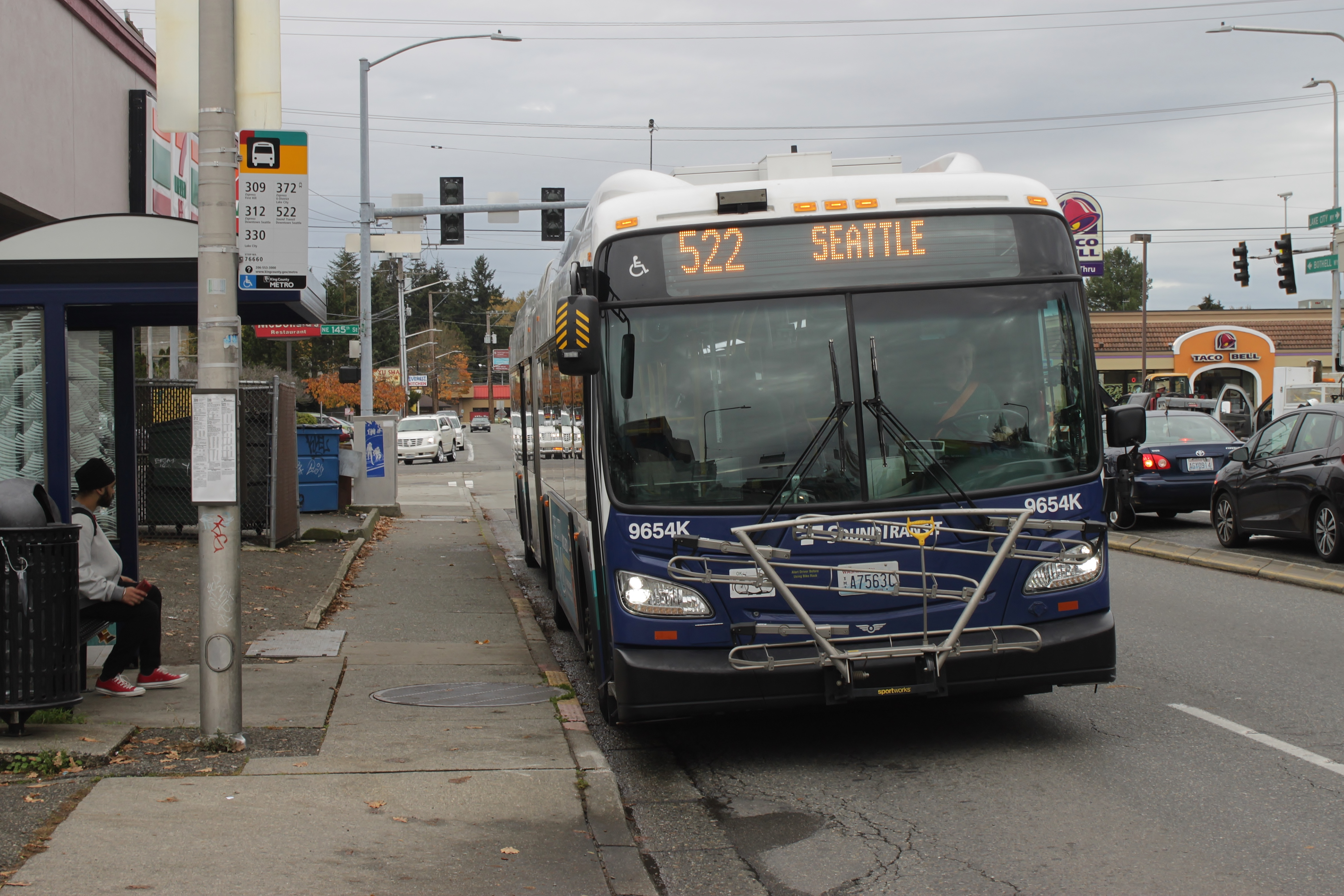
A Sound Transit Express bus on route 522, stopping at Lake City Way and NE 145th Street in Seattle

The western portion of SR 522, including Lake City Way and Bothell Way, is a major public transit corridor for the region and is served by Sound Transit Express and King County Metro bus routes. Bus lanes were added to sections of SR 522 in Seattle, Lake Forest Park, and Kenmore in the 1990s, and were expanded in the 2000s. In 2002, Sound Transit launched express Route 522, traveling between Downtown Seattle and Woodinville. The route was truncated to the Roosevelt light rail station when it opened in October 2021.

Sound Transit plans to run a Stride bus rapid transit line on SR 522 from NE 145th Street to the University of Washington Bothell campus as part of its Sound Transit 3 program, approved in 2016. The S3 Line is scheduled to begin service in 2028 and will terminate at the NE 148th Street light rail station in Shoreline. The corridor has also been proposed for forms of rail transit since the mid-20th century, including the failed Forward Thrust ballot measures of 1968 and 1970, the Seattle Monorail Project, and light rail in the Sound Transit long-range plan.

== Major intersections ==
All exits are unnumbered.

County	Location	mi	km	Destinations	Notes
King	Seattle	0.00	0.00	I-5 south	Interchange; westbound exit and eastbound entrance
King	Seattle	0.34– 0.41	0.55– 0.66	To I-5 / Roosevelt Way	Interchange; westbound exit and eastbound entrance
King	Seattle	3.21	5.17	Northeast 125th Street	Former SR 513
King	Seattle	4.22	6.79	SR 523 west (Northeast 145th Street)	
King	Lake Forest Park	5.85	9.41	SR 104 west (Ballinger Way) to I-5 – Edmonds, Mountlake Terrace	
King	Bothell	9.77	15.72	Bothell Way – Everett	Former SR 527
King	Bothell			West end of freeway	
King	Bothell	11.06	17.80	I-405 – Bellevue, Everett	
King	Woodinville	12.01	19.33	SR 202 east – Woodinville, Redmond	
King	Woodinville	12.90	20.76	Northeast 195th Street – Duvall	Eastbound exit and westbound entrance
Snohomish		14.05	22.61	SR 9 north – Snohomish, Arlington	
Snohomish				East end of freeway, west end of divided highway	
Snohomish	Maltby	16.56	26.65	SR 524 west (Maltby Road) / Paradise Lake Road	
Snohomish		18.58	29.90	Fales Road, Echo Lake Road	Interchange
Snohomish				West end of freeway, east end of divided highway	
Snohomish	Monroe	24.14	38.85	West Main Street – Monroe	
Snohomish	Monroe	24.64	39.65	US 2 – Everett, Wenatchee	
1.000 mi = 1.609 km; 1.000 km = 0.621 mi: Incomplete access
