= 85th Street station =

85th Street station may refer to one of the following:

- 85th Street–Forest Parkway station in New York City
- Northeast 85th Street station in Kirkland, Washington, U.S.
