= Shoreline Christian School (Shoreline, Washington) =

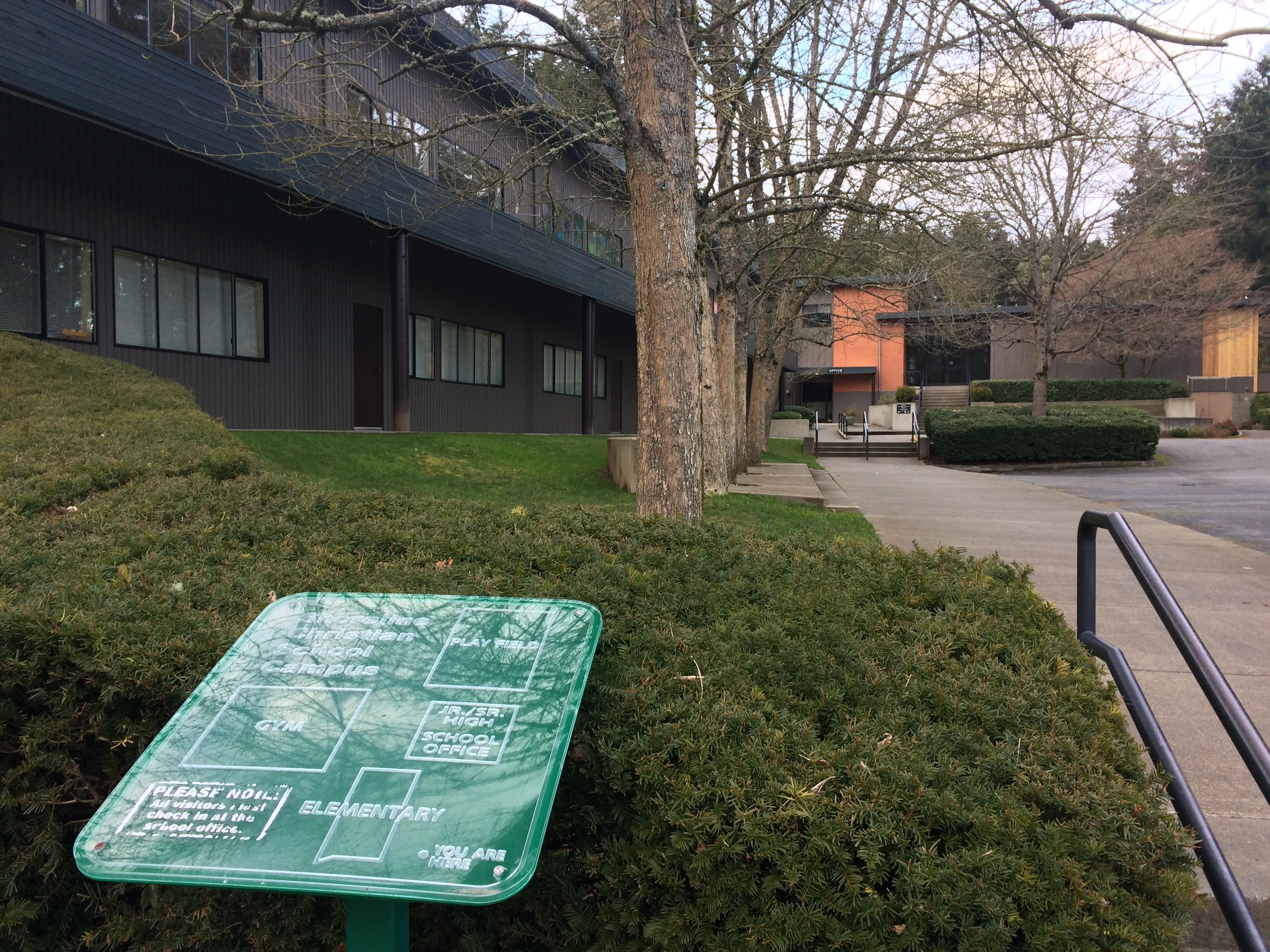

Location
- 2400 NE 147th Street; Shoreline, King, Washington 98155; United States
- Coordinates: 47°44′10″N 122°18′11″W

Information
- Established: 1952
- Faculty: 35
- Grades: PK–12
- Gender: Coeducational
- Colors: Green & white
- Mascot: Chargers
- Accreditation: Christian Schools International
- Website: Shoreline Christian School

Shoreline Christian School is a private Christian school located in Shoreline, Washington, a suburb of Seattle. The school serves pre-kindergarten through 12th grade (PK–12). Shoreline Christian is affiliated with the Christian Reformed Church but students come from many other denominations.

== History ==
1952: The school was founded in 1952 by the Christian Education Society of Seattle under the name of Calvin Christian School. The Rev. Watson Groen died in that year and the name of the school was changed to Watson Groen Christian School. The school began with students in grades 1–8 under the tutelage of the first teacher, Miss Parker. The first classes were conducted in the home of Howard and Genevieve Long.

- 1953: The first school building was constructed with two classrooms at the present address.
- 1958: The first class of high school seniors graduated. School enrollment was 108 students.
- 1965: Kindergarten classes were added.
- 1967: The new high school building was completed.
- 1977: The new gymnasium was dedicated.
- 1996: The school gained accreditation by the Northwest Association of Schools and Colleges.
- 1997: The name of the school was changed to Shoreline Christian School.

== High school sports ==
- Baseball
- Basketball
- Golf
- Soccer
- Track
- Volleyball
