= Seattle Super Saunter =

Annual walking tour of Seattle

- Date: May
- Frequency: Annually
- Location: Seattle
- Inaugurated: 2025
- Participants: 1,500 (2026)
- Website: https://www.seattlesupersaunter.com/

The Seattle Super Saunter is an annual self-guided walking event where participants cross the city of Seattle, covering up to 24 miles (39 km). In 2026, the organizer's recommended route started at the Shoreline South/148th station and ended at the Garden of Gethsemane Church in Columbia City, with stops along the way at Gas Works Park, Pike Place Market, and the Space Needle.

The event was founded by Holden Minor Ringer, a walking enthusiast who previously walked 4,500 miles (7,200 km) from La Push, Washington to Fairfield, Connecticut. He calls the event a "build-your-own adventure" intended to help people see more of Seattle. Ringer is also a member of the Transportation Choices Coalition, a nonprofit advocating for better bike and pedestrian infrastructure, and intended the event to build community and spread awareness of accessibility issues.

The first edition, held in 2025, had roughly 300 participants. The second edition grew to over 1,500 registered attendees.
