= Echo Lake (Shoreline, Washington) =

Lake in Shoreline, Washington

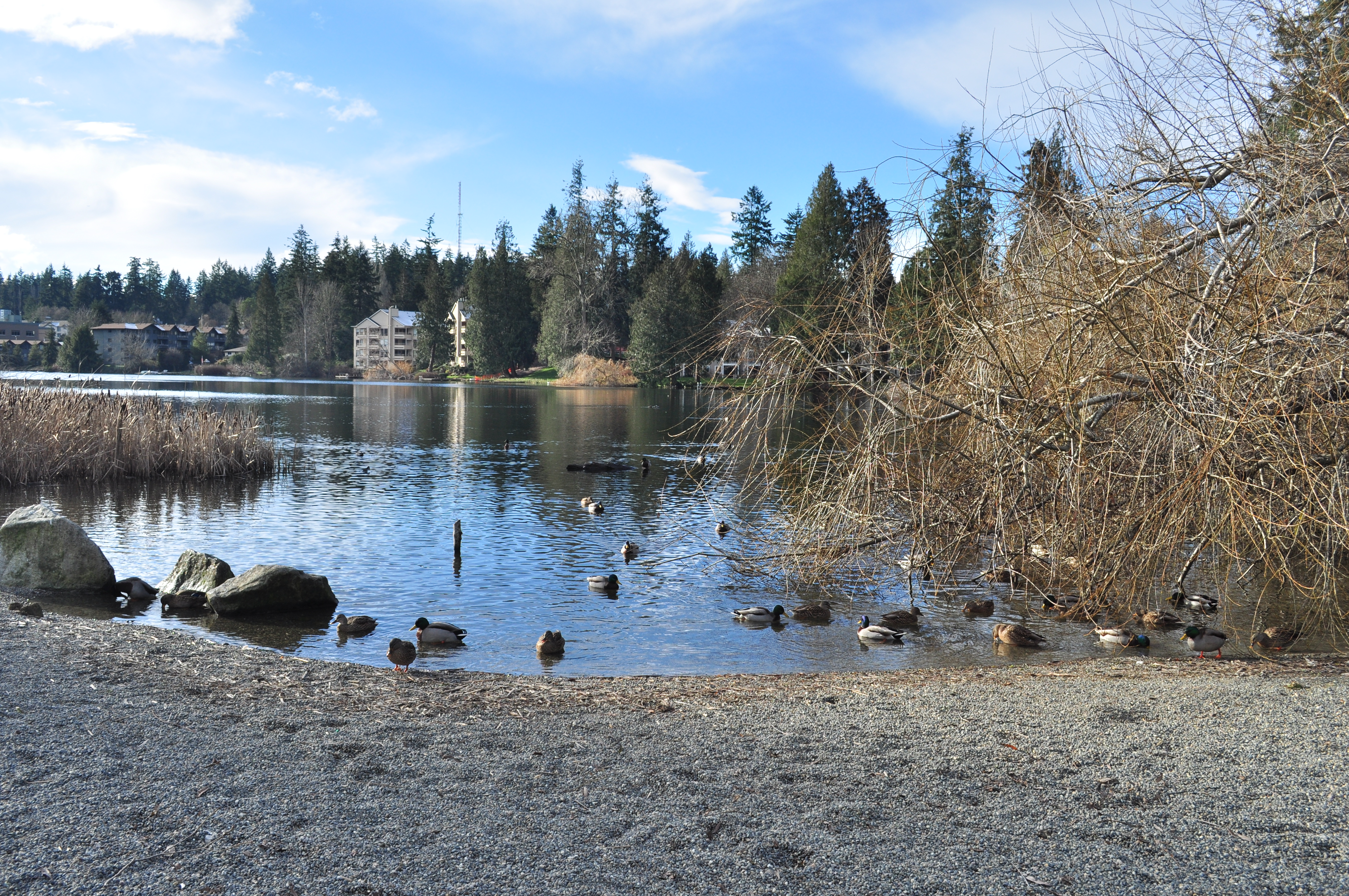
- Echo Lake from Echo Lake Park

- Location within Washington (state) Location within the United States
- Location: Shoreline, Washington
- Coordinates: 47.771421°N 122.343184°W
- Basin countries: United States
- Surface area: 11.10 acres (4.49 ha)
- Max. depth: 30 ft (9.1 m)
- Surface elevation: 395 ft (120 m)

Echo Lake is located in Shoreline, Washington, a suburb adjacent to Seattle. Echo Lake Park sits on its northeastern corner.

== History ==
Echo Lake has played an important role in Shoreline's history. During the 1800s, logging was a significant industry in the region. In the early 1900s, Mowatt's Sawmill operated at the north end of Echo Lake.

From 1916 to 1996, the lake had a bathing beach that cost a nickel for admission. The lake was a center for social life, especially during the summer. Apartment buildings now stand on the former beach site.

== Description ==
Echo Lake Park contains popular amenities such as a beach, paved trails, a playground, and public art.

Echo Lake is stocked with rainbow trout by the Washington State Department of Fish and Wildlife. The lake suffers from high nutrient levels (eutrophication), causing algal growth and impacting water quality. In April 2021, these conditions led to algal blooms containing anatoxin, a highly toxic chemical. This led to a temporary lake closure.
