= Kruckeberg Botanic Garden =

Botanical garden in Shoreline, Washington, United States

Coordinates: 47.7763°N 122.3766°W

- Interactive map of Kruckeberg Botanic Garden
- Type: Botanical garden
- Location: 20312 Fifteenth Avenue NW, Shoreline, Washington
- Area: 4 acres (1.6 ha)
- Founder: Arthur Rice Kruckeberg, Mareen Schultz Kruckeberg
- Website: www.kruckeberg.org

The Kruckeberg Botanic Garden is a 4-acre (1.6 ha) botanical garden located at 20312 Fifteenth Avenue NW, Shoreline, Washington. It is currently open to the public at designated hours which alternate seasonally. It is also open for tours, by appointment, and for horticultural workshops.

== History ==
The garden was first begun in 1958 by Prof. Arthur Rice Kruckeberg, University of Washington, and his wife Mareen Schultz Kruckeberg. A foundation was formed in 1998 to preserve their garden, and in 2003 it received an easement to preserve the garden in perpetuity.

== Species ==
The garden contains a mix of native species with non-native specimens, mainly from China and Japan. It includes exotic conifers (larches, sequoias, pines, firs, spruces, and hemlocks); hardwoods, especially oaks and maples; rhododendrons, magnolias, a unique wingnut, and many other woody plants, as well as notable displays of ferns, cyclamens, wood sorrel, and inside-out flower.

The garden contains four State Champion trees: Tanoak (Lithocarpus densiflorus), mutant Tanoak (Lithocarpus densiflorus 'Attenuato-dentatus'), striped-bark maple (Acer davidii), and Chokecherry (Prunus virginiana). It also contains various rare trees of interest, including Caucasian Spruce, Brewer's Spruce, Chilean fire tree (Embothrium coccineum), and Eucryphia glutinosa.

== See also ==
- List of botanical gardens in the United States
