= Kirkland/NE 85th station =

Future bus rapid transit station in Kirkland, Washington, U.S.

Kirkland/NE 85th
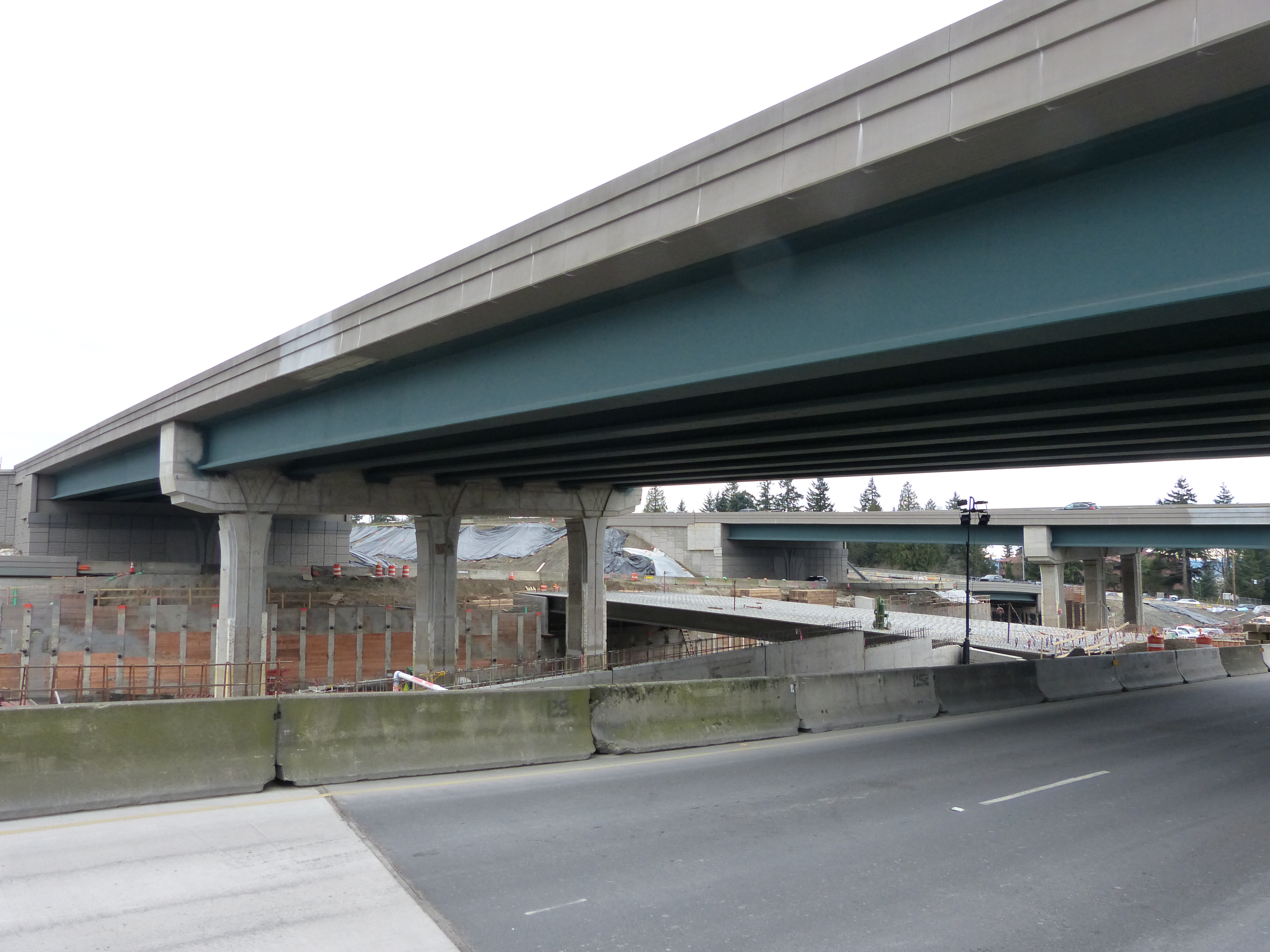
- Northeast 85th Street station under construction in January 2026

General information
- Location: Kirkland, Washington, US
- Coordinates: 47°40′50″N 122°11′0″W
- Owner: Sound Transit
- Bus routes: 1
- Bus stands: 2
- Bus operators: Sound Transit
Location

Kirkland/NE 85th station is a future bus rapid transit (BRT) station in Kirkland, Washington, United States. The station will be located at the intersection of Interstate 405 and Northeast 85th Street near the city center. It will be served by the Stride S2 Line, operated by Sound Transit.

== Design and cost ==
The station's construction entails the complete replacement of a cloverleaf interchange with a three-level interchange with separate ramps for buses. The lower level of the interchange, for local non-transit vehicles, has a roughly figure-8 aspect which has been called "peanut shaped".

Projected costs of the NE 85th Street station are estimated at up to a third of a billion dollars, making it one of the most expensive BRT projects planned by Sound Transit. The city's existing transit center is located about a mile away and at about 200 feet lower in elevation. A proposal to connect the two stations with a funicular climbing Rose Hill, the first aerial tramway in the Seattle area, was proposed in the late 2010s.

== History ==
The project was approved by voters in 2016 with the passage of Sound Transit 3 and is fully funded at $250–300 million. Public meetings for the project kicked off in April 2018. The station was originally planned to open in 2024 after three years of construction. The three-level design incorporating a dogbone interchange under Interstate 405 will be the first of its kind in the United States, and the most expensive bus stop in Sound Transit's bus rapid transit system. Sound Transit estimates that the station could transport a few hundred passengers a day in the 2020s.

A five-building office development for Google was planned southeast of the interchange on the site of a car dealership, with an estimated 7,000 employees by 2032. Google canceled the project in 2023, but the city said that other opportunities for development in the vicinity of the bus station would be pursued.

=== Construction ===
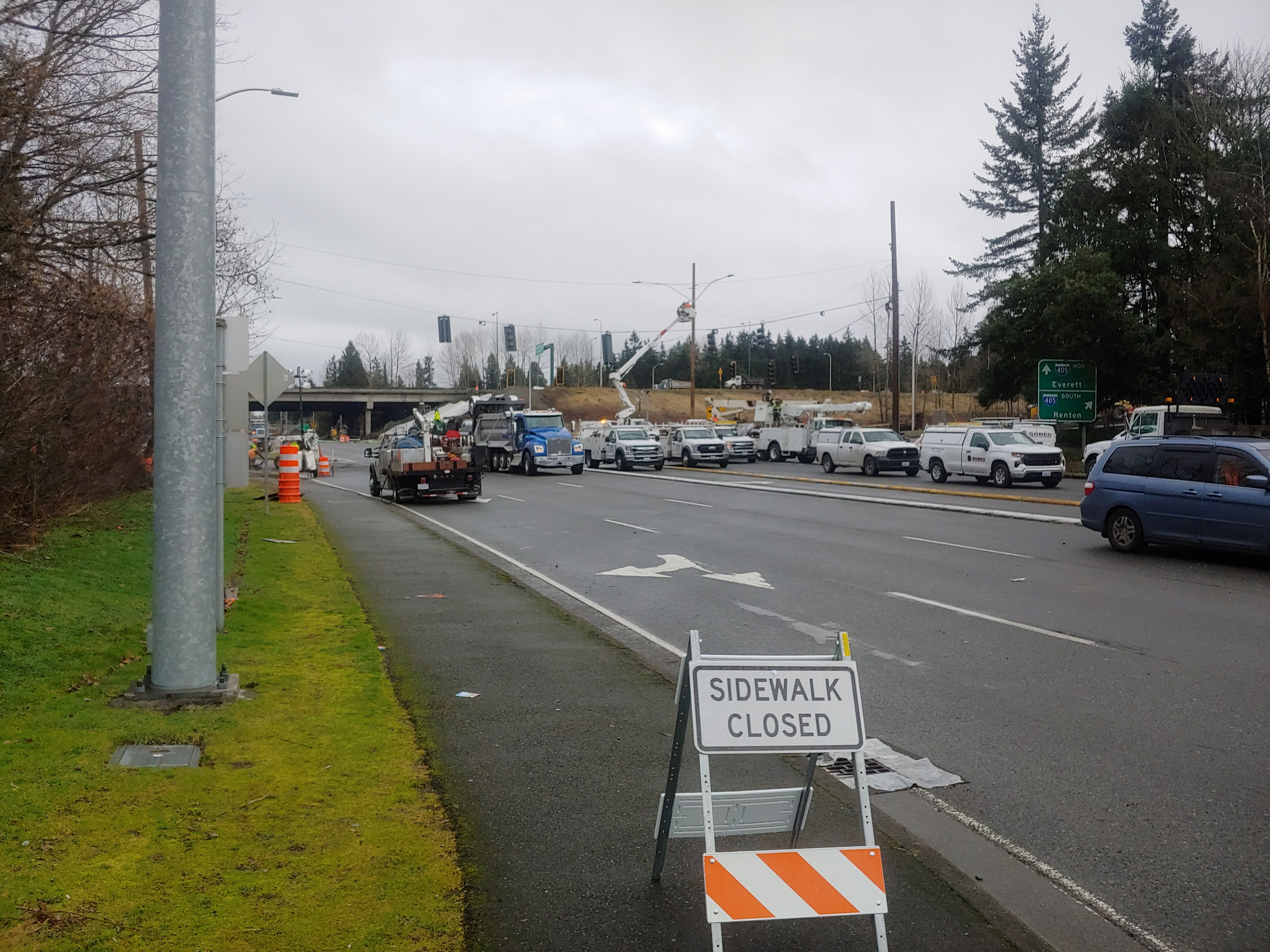
Construction begins in January 2024

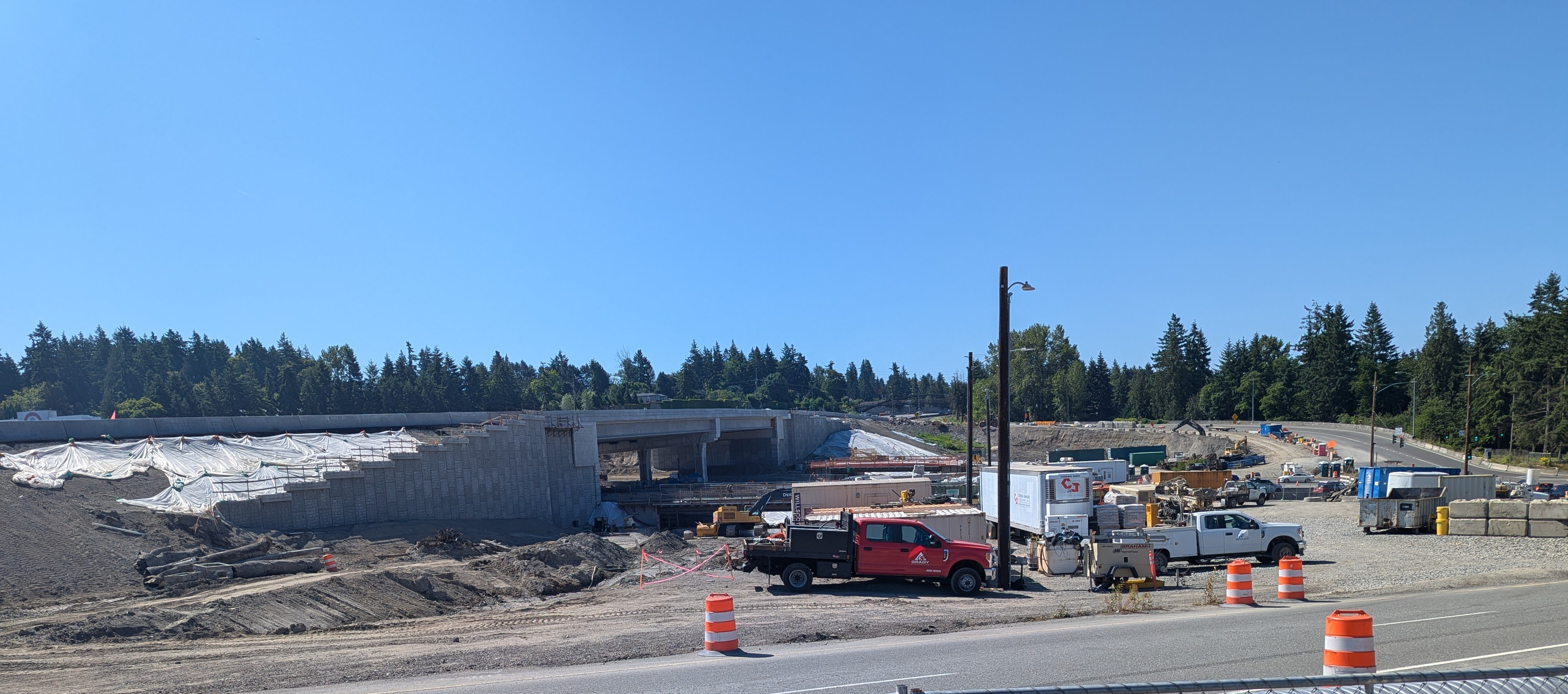
Under construction in June 2025

Project groundbreaking officially took place in September 2023, and major construction began in January 2024 with demolition of the I-405 cloverleaf ramps at Northeast 85th Street. The former Interstate 405 overpass was demolished in May 2025, and traffic was re-routed to new spans. The first phase of the interchange opened in May 2026.
