= Shoreline South/148th station =

Link light rail station in Shoreline, Washington, U.S.

43 Shoreline South/148th
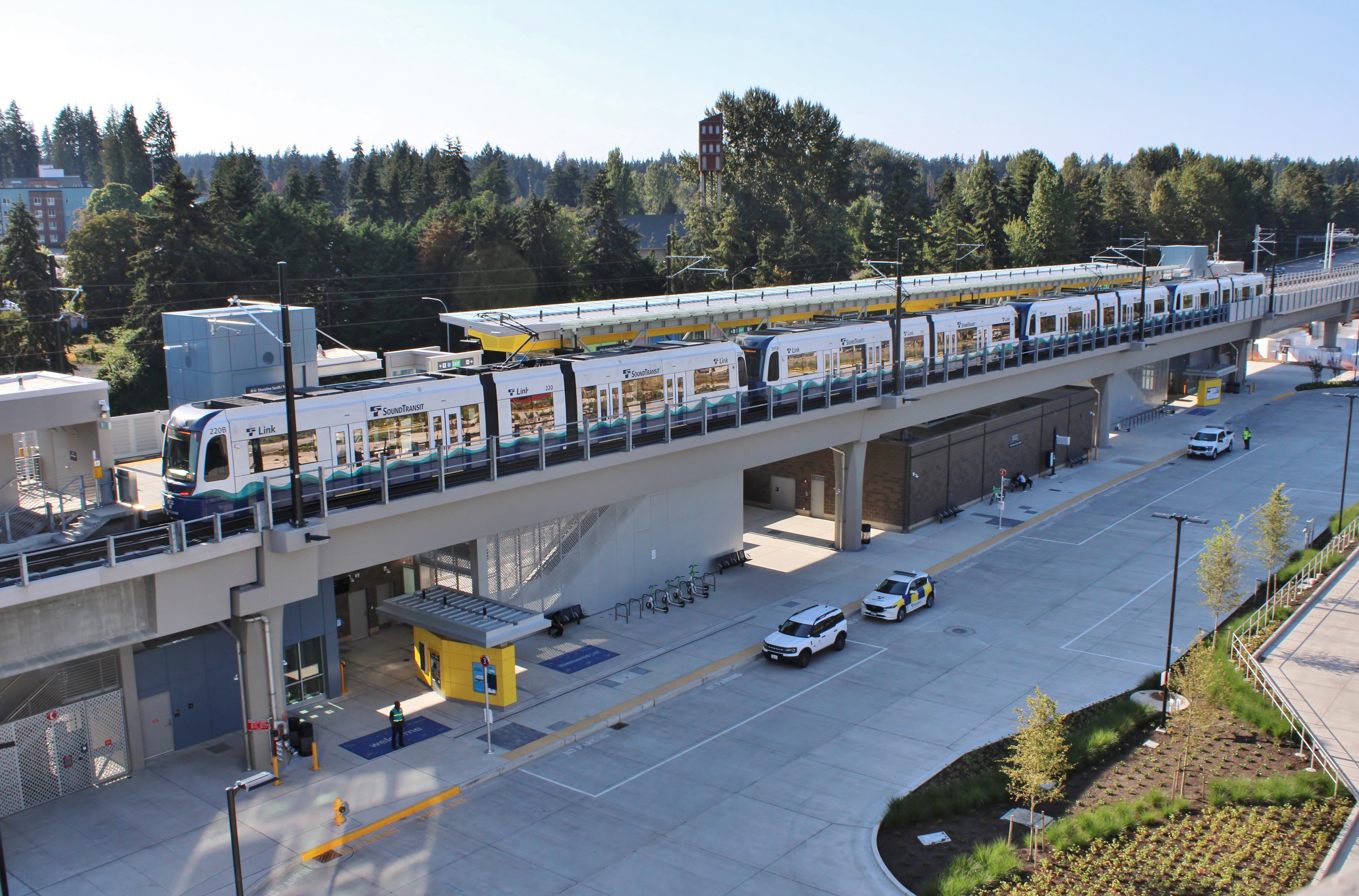
- Platform viewed from the parking garage

General information
- Location: 14711 5th Avenue Northeast; Shoreline, Washington, U.S.
- Coordinates: 47°44′10″N 122°19′31″W
- System: Link light rail
- Operator: Sound Transit
- Line: Lynnwood Link Extension
- Platforms: 1 center platform
- Tracks: 2
- Train operators: Sound Transit
- Bus routes: 5
- Bus stands: 4
- Bus operators: King County Metro

Construction
- Structure type: Elevated
- Parking: 500 spaces
- Cycle facilities: Lockers and racks
- Accessible: Yes

History
- Opened: August 30, 2024

Passengers
- 1,535 daily weekday boardings (2025); 501,993 total boardings (2025)

Services
Preceding station	Sound Transit	Following station
Link
Shoreline North/185th toward Lynnwood City Center	1 Line	Pinehurst toward Federal Way Downtown
Shoreline North/185th toward Lynnwood City Center	2 Line	Pinehurst toward Downtown Redmond
Location

Shoreline South/148th station is an elevated light rail station in Shoreline, Washington, United States. It is served by the 1 Line and 2 Line, part of the Link light rail system managed by Sound Transit. The station is located northeast of the intersection of Interstate 5 and State Route 523 (NE 145th Street). It opened on August 30, 2024, with the rest of the Lynnwood Link Extension.

The interchange was previously home to a flyer stop used by King County Metro and Sound Transit Express routes.

== Location ==
Shoreline South/148th station is located adjacent to Interstate 5 at State Route 523 (NE 145th Street), which is situated between the cities of Seattle and Shoreline. The elevated station is in the northeast corner of the interchange, attached to a 500-stall parking garage with access from 5th Avenue NE.

In August 2016, Sound Transit moved the station's location approximately 400 feet (120 m) north of the initial site to Northeast 148th Street to improve bus connections. A pedestrian bridge over I-5 at Northeast 148th Street by the City of Shoreline began construction in 2023 and is scheduled to open in early 2027. The area west of the freeway was rezoned for denser residential development by the Shoreline city government with a planned cap of 2,214 units; several multi-story buildings were constructed in the 2020s following the assembly of existing residential parcels.

== History ==
The Northeast 145th Street flyer stop was built by Metro Transit in 1979, with thru ramps for both northbound and southbound buses. An additional set of ramps allowed buses entering and exiting I-5 via SR 523 to serve the flyer stops. Community Transit, which serves the Interstate 5 corridor, elected to not use the flyer stop due to potential overcrowding on its routes from Downtown Seattle.

In October 2020, the Sound Transit Board approved renaming the station from Shoreline South/145th to Shoreline South/148th per a request from the Shoreline government to better reflect the revised location of the station. Light rail service began on August 30, 2024.

In 2025 and 2026, the station served as the starting point for the Seattle Super Saunter, a roughly 20 mile walking tour of the city.
