= Shoreline, Washington =

- City
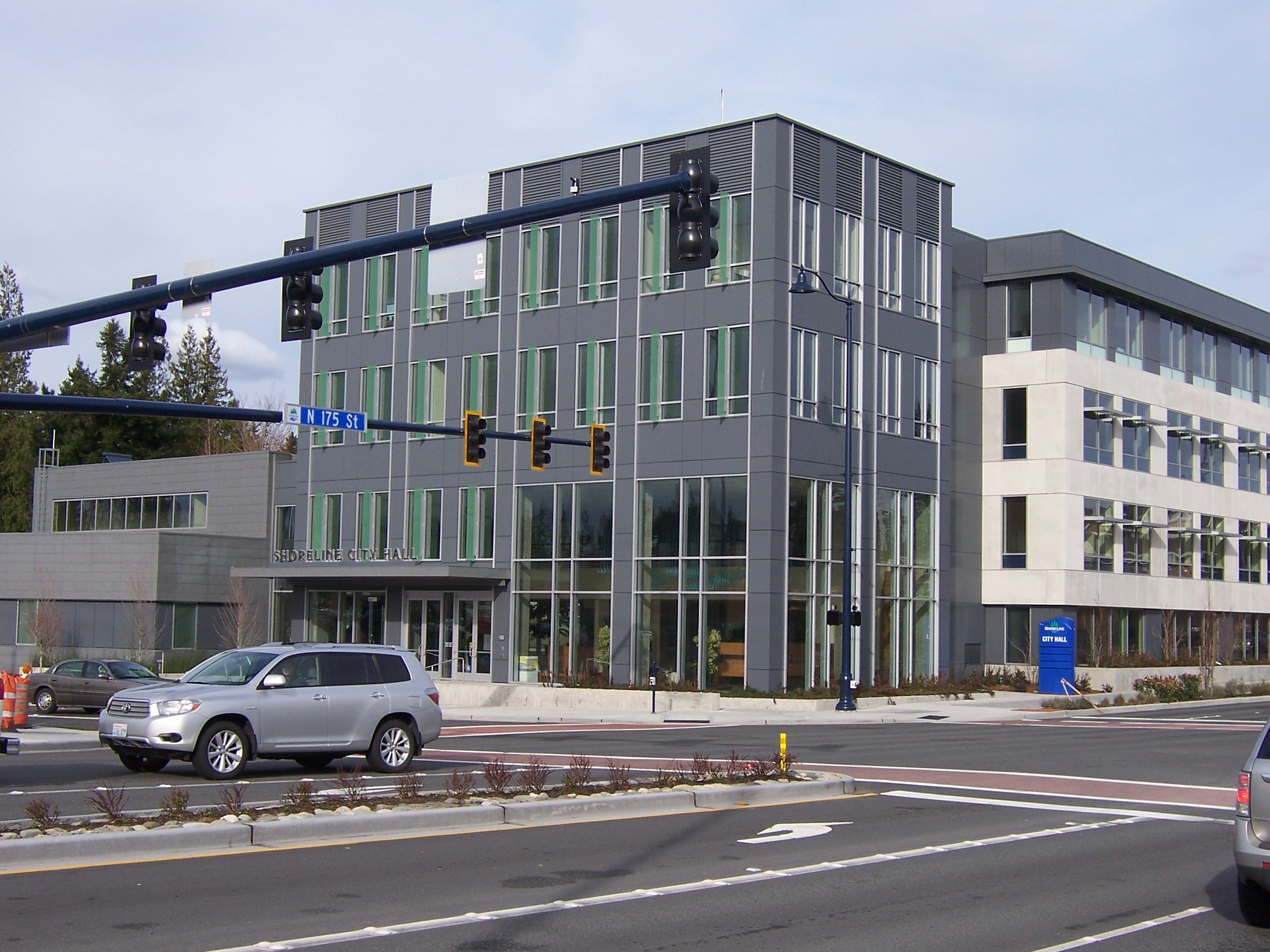
- Shoreline City Hall
- Interactive location map of Shoreline
- Coordinates: 47°45′23″N 122°20′43″W
- Country: United States
- State: Washington
- County: King
- City: August 31, 1995

Government
  - Type: Council–manager
  - Mayor: Betsy Robertson
  - Manager: Bristol S. Ellington

Area
  - Total: 12.44 sq mi (32.21 km^{2})
  - Land: 11.63 sq mi (30.13 km^{2})
  - Water: 0.80 sq mi (2.08 km^{2})
- Elevation: 472 ft (144 m)

Population (2020)
  - Total: 58,608
  - Estimate (2024): 66,251
  - Rank: US: 594th WA: 20th
  - Density: 4,901.4/sq mi (1,892.46/km^{2})
- Time zone: UTC-8 (Pacific (PST))
  - Summer (DST): UTC-7 (PDT)
- ZIP Codes: 98133, 98155, 98177
- Area code(s): 206, 564
- FIPS code: 53-63960
- GNIS feature ID: 2411893
- Website: www.shorelinewa.gov

Shoreline is a city in King County, Washington, United States. It is located between the city limits of Seattle and the Snohomish County border, approximately 9 miles (14 km) north of Downtown Seattle. As of the 2020 census, the population of Shoreline was 58,608, making it the 22nd largest city in the state. Based on per capita income, one of the more reliable measures of affluence, Shoreline ranks 91st of 522 areas in the state of Washington to be ranked.

== History ==
=== Coast Salish ===
The modern-day Shoreline area is within the historic territory of local Coast Salish peoples, now considered subgroups of the Duwamish. A trail stretched from Salmon Bay (šilšul), where Shilshole (šilšulabš) villages were, to Green Lake, and then traveled north through bogs that housed Licton Springs and the headwaters of the south fork of Thornton Creek, and continued up to Haller Lake. From there it wound through the peat bogs where Twin Ponds and Ronald Bog Parks are now. Large quantities of cranberries were once gathered at these bogs, as well as salmonberries and skunk cabbage along the banks of Thornton Creek. The x̌ax̌čuʔabš from Lake Union (x̌ax̌čuʔ) traveled to this area to gather cranberries.

From there the trail continued north to Echo Lake. There was a large burned area from Echo Lake, through the Richmond Highlands, and south to Bitter Lake, likely a clearing intentionally burned to maintain the harvest of roots like bracken fern and camas, berries, and hunting grounds. The trail forked at Echo Lake, one trail heading west to Richmond Beach and one trail continued north to Lake Ballinger. The šilšulabš had seasonal camps at Richmond Beach and Boeing Creek, which were notable sources of kinnikinnick and is commemorated in a local park name, Kayu Kayu Ac. At Lake Ballinger, the trail forked into three trails: northeast to Hall Lake and Scriber Lake and the surrounding marshes, southeast along McAleer Creek to the current Town Center at Lake Forest Park, and northwest to a large marsh that is now downtown Edmonds. The people who lived in Lake Forest Park and other winter villages along Lake Washington (x̌ačuʔ) were called x̌ačuʔabš.

=== Modern settlement ===
The Shoreline Historical Museum

Shoreline as is now known began in 1890 with the platting of the neighborhood of Richmond Beach, on Puget Sound, in anticipation of the arrival of the Great Northern Railway the next year. Over the next two decades, Shoreline was connected to Seattle via the Seattle–Everett Interurban streetcar line (1906) and North Trunk Road (now Aurora Avenue N., State Route 99) (1913), helping to increase its population.

The name "Shoreline" was applied to this stretch of unincorporated King County in 1944 when it was given to the school district, since the school district boundaries stretched from "Shore to Shore" (Puget Sound to Lake Washington) and "Line to Line" (the old Seattle city limit of 85th St to the Snohomish County Line). Though the modern borders of the city do not stretch to Lake Washington, the area has kept the "Shoreline" name. From 1950 to 1957, it was the fastest-growing area in the Seattle metropolitan area, with a 64 percent population increase.

After the incorporation of Lake Forest Park in 1961, the remainder of the Shoreline School District remained an unincorporated portion of King County. The school district remained the main identifier for the area for several decades; a set of welcome signs were installed in 1983 by the Shoreline Chamber of Commerce bearing the name. The City of Seattle began studying an annexation of the area in 1988, causing local residents to organize an incorporation measure to retain their separate school system. A half-century after it had been named, on August 31, 1995, Shoreline was officially incorporated as a code city, and it adopted the council–manager form of government. It was the fourth-largest city in King County and tenth-largest in the state at the time of its incorporation.

== Geography ==
Shoreline is located at the northwestern corner of King County, immediately north of Seattle at North 145th Street, and is bordered to the west by Puget Sound. The northern boundary with Snohomish County runs along North 205th Street, beyond which are the cities of Woodway, Edmonds, and Mountlake Terrace. Lake Forest Park lies to the east and separates Shoreline from Lake Washington. According to the United States Census Bureau, the city has a total area of 11.70 square miles (30.30 km^{2}), of which, 11.67 square miles (30.23 km^{2}) is land and 0.03 square miles (0.08 km^{2}) is water. The city has 3.4 miles (5.5 km) of total shoreline and sits at an average elevation of 375 feet (114 m); its highest point is 536 feet (163 m) above sea level.

The city of Shoreline also contains a gated community, The Highlands, which was designed by the Olmsted Brothers. The community is served by a separate special district for its sewage and stormwater treatment services from the rest of the city.

=== Neighborhoods ===
Shoreline is divided into 14 neighborhoods, according to the city government's designation. The neighborhood boundaries have been laid out more-or-less rectangularly according to street maps, rather than following socioeconomic or natural boundaries.

The city maintains a council of neighborhoods, with the intent of bringing together community leaders from each of the neighborhoods for discussions and coordination of city programs that affect the neighborhoods. The Richmond Beach neighborhood occupies the northwest corner of the city.

The developer of Point Wells, a waterfront property northwest of Shoreline near Woodway, has offered to be annexed into the city. If accepted, the city would extend into Snohomish County. As of 2020, The Shoreline and Woodway city governments have discussed plans for subarea policies and development regulations in the event of annexation of Point Wells by either city. The governments of both of the urban areas have taken steps to update their plans in accordance to their joint committee.

== Economy ==
Shoreline is a bedroom community for workers employed in Seattle and other cities. The United States Census Bureau estimated that 32,566 residents of the city were in the labor force in 2023. Of them, 7.3 percent worked within the city limits of Shoreline; 46.7 percent commuted to Seattle. The mean one-way commute for the city's workforce was 27.7 minutes; approximately 59.1 percent of commuters drove alone to their place of employment, while 22.6 percent worked from home.

The city has several major employers in the professional services and retail sectors that are concentrated on the Aurora Avenue corridor. These include the city government, Shoreline School District, Shoreline Community College, and the Washington State Department of Transportation. Shoreline also has Costco, Fred Meyer, and Home Depot stores that are among the largest employers in the city. The city's sales tax rate is 10.4 percent. Crista Ministries is a religious aid organization based in Shoreline that operates several local Christian schools, retirement centers, and radio stations.

== Demographics ==
Historical population
Census	Pop.	Note	%±
1990	52,109		—
2000	53,025		1.8%
2010	53,007		0.0%
2020	58,608		10.6%
2024 (est.)	66,251		13.0%
U.S. Decennial Census; 2020 Census

Shoreline is the tenth largest city in King County by population with 58,608 residents as of the 2020 census.

=== 2020 census ===
As of the 2020 census, Shoreline had a population of 58,608 and a median age of 40.9 years. 19.2% of residents were under the age of 18, 18.3% were 65 years of age or older, and there were 96.6 males per 100 females and 94.5 males per 100 females age 18 and over.

99.7% of residents lived in urban areas, while 0.3% lived in rural areas.

There were 23,139 households in Shoreline, of which 28.5% had children under the age of 18 living in them. Of all households, 47.2% were married-couple households, 18.8% were households with a male householder and no spouse or partner present, and 26.5% were households with a female householder and no spouse or partner present. About 28.4% of all households were made up of individuals and 11.9% had someone living alone who was 65 years of age or older.

There were 24,043 housing units, of which 3.8% were vacant. The homeowner vacancy rate was 0.9% and the rental vacancy rate was 3.5%.

Racial composition as of the 2020 census
Race	Number	Percent
White	36,354	62.0%
Black or African American	3,732	6.4%
American Indian and Alaska Native	517	0.9%
Asian	9,383	16.0%
Native Hawaiian and Other Pacific Islander	235	0.4%
Some other race	2,306	3.9%
Two or more races	6,081	10.4%
Hispanic or Latino (of any race)	5,315	9.1%

=== 2010 census ===
As of the 2010 census, there were 53,007 people, 21,561 households, and 13,168 families living in the city. The population density was 4,542.2 inhabitants per square mile (1,753.8/km^{2}). There were 22,787 housing units at an average density of 1,952.6 per square mile (753.9/km^{2}). The racial makeup of the city was 71.4% White, 5.0% African American, 0.8% Native American, 15.2% Asian, 0.3% Pacific Islander, 2.2% from other races, and 5.1% from two or more races. Hispanic or Latino of any race were 6.6% of the population.

There were 21,561 households, of which 27.9% had children under the age of 18 living with them, 46.4% were married couples living together, 10.3% had a female householder with no husband present, 4.4% had a male householder with no wife present, and 38.9% were non-families. 29.7% of all households were made up of individuals, and 10.4% had someone living alone who was 65 years of age or older. The average household size was 2.39 and the average family size was 2.96.

The median age in the city was 42.1 years. 19.1% of residents were under the age of 18; 8.2% were between the ages of 18 and 24; 26.7% were from 25 to 44; 30.9% were from 45 to 64; and 15.2% were 65 years of age or older. The gender makeup of the city was 48.7% male and 51.3% female.

== Government and politics ==
Shoreline is a non-charter code city that was incorporated in 1995 and uses a council–manager form of government. The city council has seven members who are elected at-large and serve part-time during their four-year terms. They are the city's governing body and also choose members to serve as mayor and deputy mayor. Betsy Robertson has served as mayor since 2026. The city manager is hired by the council to oversee day-to-day operations of the government, which comprises several departments and 223 total full-time employees. Shoreline's city budget was $250 million in 2025.

The city is part of several regional government entities who provide services to Shoreline residents. The Shoreline Regional Fire Authority was created in 2025 as the successor to the municipal fire department; it serves Shoreline as well as neighboring Kenmore and Lake Forest Park.

As a close-in suburb of Seattle, Shoreline's politics lean to the left. In recent years, its voting habits - as well as those of neighboring Lake Forest Park - have become even more similar to those of Seattle, overwhelmingly in support of Democratic politicians.

=== Police ===
Shoreline contracts with the King County Sheriff's Office for police services. Deputies assigned to Shoreline wear city uniforms and drive patrol cars marked with the city logo. As of 2012, there are 52 full-time employees assigned to the Shoreline Police Department. The Shoreline Police Department has a burglary/larceny unit, traffic unit, and a street crimes unit.

== City landmarks ==
The City of Shoreline has designated the following landmarks:

Landmark	Built	Listed	Address
William E. Boeing House	1914	1994	The Highlands
Crawford Store (Godfrey Building)	1922	1985	2411 NW 195th Place

In addition, the city designates the following "community landmark":

Landmark	Built	Listed	Address	Photo
Ronald Grade School	1912	1995	749 N 175th Street	

== Parks and recreation ==
Shoreline's 25 parks hold a total of 330 acres (130 ha) of park land. Boeing Creek and Shoreview Park, which abuts Shoreline Community College, contains Boeing Creek, flowing on its way to Hidden Lake and Puget Sound. Echo Lake is located within city limits, and contains Echo Lake Park. Other parks include Hamlin Park and Kruckeberg Botanic Garden.

== Education ==
=== School districts ===
- Shoreline School District
  - Shorecrest High School
  - Shorewood High School
  - Some of the schools, including Kellogg Middle School participate in an exchange student program with junior high students from Nichinan, in Tottori Prefecture of Japan.

A third high school, Shoreline High School, closed in June 1986 due to a decline in enrollment; its 1,000 students were divided between Shorecrest and Shorewood. The campus was retained by the school district for use as their headquarters and later became the Spartan Campus, which includes a public gymnasium, theater, and stadium.

=== Private schools ===
- King's Schools
- Shoreline Christian School
- The Evergreen School

=== Colleges ===
- Shoreline Community College

== Infrastructure ==
=== Transportation ===
Shoreline is bisected by two major north–south highways: Interstate 5, the main inter-city freeway in Western Washington; and State Route 99 (Aurora Avenue), which travels south to Seattle and north to Everett. State Route 523 (145th Street) forms the southern boundary of the city and connects Interstate 5, State Route 99, and State Route 522 (Lake City Way). The Interurban Trail runs along State Route 99 and follows the route of the former Seattle–Everett interurban railway. It was constructed in the 2000s to connect Seattle with Everett and was completed within Shoreline in September 2007.

The city has two Link light rail stations near Interstate 5 that are served by Sound Transit's 1 Line and 2 Line: Shoreline South/148th station near the State Route 523 interchange; and Shoreline North/185th station near North City. Both stations have park-and-ride garages with a combined 1,000 stalls and will become termini for bus rapid transit lines. The county's King County Metro provides local and commuter bus service within Shoreline, which includes the RapidRide E Line on Aurora Avenue. It debuted one of its first paratransit vans in the then-unincorporated area in 1979 to address a need for east–west connections. The agency has a bus base, named North Base, along I-5 in Shoreline that opened in 1991.

Shoreline began a bicycle-sharing and scooter-sharing pilot in August 2024 with Lime.

=== Healthcare ===
The city is home to the Fircrest School, a facility for people with developmental disabilities that is run by the Washington Department of Social and Health Services. Its 90-acre (36 ha) campus was previously used as a naval hospital during World War II and sanitarium before being repurposed in 1951. The Washington State Department of Health also operates a public health laboratory on a portion of the campus that was opened in 1985 and designated as a COVID-19 quarantine site in early 2020.

=== Utilities ===
Shoreline's electric power is provided by Seattle City Light, the public utility of the city of Seattle. Natural gas for buildings is provided by Puget Sound Energy. The city government manages wastewater and stormwater treatment except for the Highlands area, which has its own separate utility.

== Notable people ==
- Michelle Akers, professional soccer player and Olympian
- Joaquin Avila, voting rights activist and lawyer
- Donn Charnley, Teacher, professor, politician and state legislator
- Charles R. Cross, music journalist and author
- Lauren Davis, politician and state legislator
- Josh Hawkinson, professional basketball player and Olympian
- Lori Henry, soccer player and coach
- George John, professional soccer player
- Grant Jones, landscape architect and poet
- Lee Seung-jun, professional basketball player
- Sanjaya Malakar, singer and American Idol finalist
- Charlie Ostrem, professional soccer player
- Edwin T. Pratt, civil rights activist
- Cindy Ryu, politician and state legislator
- Jesse Salomon, politician and state legislator
- Sinatraa, professional e-sports player and streamer
- Rick Stevenson, documentary filmmaker
- Marc Wilson, professional American football player
- Rainn Wilson, actor, comedian, and writer
- Katrina Young, diver and Olympian

== Sister city ==
- Boryeong, South Chungcheong, South Korea (since 2002)
