= Roads and Transit =

Roads and Transit was a ballot measure in the U.S. State of Washington concerning transportation, that was sent to voters in the Snohomish, King, and Pierce Counties for approval on November 6, 2007. It was defeated by a margin of 56% to 44%.

In 2006, the Washington State Legislature required Sound Transit and the Regional Transportation Investment District or RTID planning committee to jointly submit a transportation financing plan to voters in the 2007 general election. RTID and Sound Transit began working together on the Roads and Transit plan in June 2006. Along with regional planning and transportation agencies, they conducted years of engineering and design work. They also informed the public and collected public comments through open houses, surveys, letters, meetings and hearings.

== Provisions ==
Roads and Transit proposed expanding mass transit and improving roads in the most heavily traveled corridors in Snohomish, King and Pierce counties. It is a unified program of investments in highways, light- and commuter-rail, HOV lanes, park-and-ride lots, and express and local bus services.

Sound Transit and RTID combined two plans in order to create a comprehensive, balanced package.

Sound Transit's portion, ST2, was intended to extend the Puget Sound region’s light-rail system to 70 miles (110 km), create thousands of new Park and Ride slots, and expand bus and commuter-rail service. It was projected to cost approximately $24 billion over twenty years, to be financed by extending a regional sales tax of 0.4% and adding an extra 0.5% sales tax.

RTID's portion, Blueprint for Progress, would have invested in state highways, bridges, and local roads in Snohomish, King, and Pierce counties in order to ease choke-points and improve safety. Increasing sales tax by 0.1% and the motor vehicle excise tax by 0.8% was projected to fund the package's twenty-year cost of $14 billion.

== Participants ==
=== Supporters ===
Plan supporters argued that the package provides a balanced and comprehensive approach to solving the traffic problem in the Puget Sound region.

The plan provided commuters with travel options. For instance, it would have extended the region's light rail system to 70 miles (110 km), which helps lift commuters out of congestion and make the environment cleaner. Additionally, nearly 12,000 park and rides slot will be created. Supporters concerned with the safety of roads endorsed the Roads and Transit proposal, because it replaces and retrofits overpasses and bridges vulnerable to earthquakes. Moreover, by reducing congestion, first responders and emergency services would be able to move more quickly on roads. By reducing congestion, Roads and Transit planned to help the Puget Sound region's economy, allowing people and goods to move more quickly and reliably. Improving freight mobility would help the region compete in an expanding global economy.

==== Endorsers ====
Organizations that endorsed the 'Yes' on Roads and Transit proposal include:

- Washington Conservation Voters
- Washington State Labor Council
- City of Bellevue
- Futurewise.org
- American Council of Engineering Companies – Washington
- Downtown Seattle Association
- Puget Sound Energy
- Washington Association of Realtors
- City of Edmonds

=== Opponents ===
King County Executive Ron Sims was initially neutral on the plan, but declared his public opposition in a September 2007 op-ed in The Seattle Times. In the piece, co-authored by Sims and his wife Cayan Topacio, they stated that Roads and Transit "continues the national policy of ignoring our impacts upon global warming". Other political leaders, including transportation chairs in both chambers of the state legislature, expressed concerns that the ballot measure would not pass due to its size and conflicting goals.

Kemper F. Freeman was chairman and chief executive officer of the Kemper Development Company, which owned and operated Bellevue Square. Freeman was also chairman of the First Mutual Bank and had served as the director of First Mutual Bancshares since 1968.

The Cascade Chapter of the Sierra Club also declared its opposition due to concerns around the impact of road expansion on global warming.

Phil Talmadge was a Seattle attorney who had previously served on the Supreme Court and the State Legislature.

Eastside Rail Now also opposed the plan in connection with its advocacy of converting BNSF's Woodinville Subdivision rail lines into the core of a regional commuter rail system.
