= Washington State Route 523 =

State highway in King County, Washington, US

State Route 523
- 145th Street
- A map of northern Seattle with SR 523 highlighted in red

Route information
- Auxiliary route of I-5
- Maintained by WSDOT
- Length: 2.45 mi (3.94 km)
- Existed: 1991–present

Major junctions
- West end: SR 99 in Seattle and Shoreline
- I-5 in Seattle and Shoreline
- East end: SR 522 in Seattle and Lake Forest Park

Location
- Country: United States
- State: Washington
- County: King

Highway system
- State highways in Washington; Interstate; US; State; Scenic; Pre-1964; 1964 renumbering; Former
← SR 522	→ SR 524

State Route 523 (SR 523, named 145th Street) is a short Washington state highway located on the city limits of Seattle, Shoreline, and Lake Forest Park in King County. The road itself runs 2.45 miles (3.94 km) east from SR 99 past Interstate 5 (I-5) and ends at SR 522; the highway was first established in 1991, but the roadway from I-5 to 5th Avenue Northeast was once the northern section of Secondary State Highway 1J from 1937 until 1964 and later SR 513 from 1964 until 1991.

== Route description ==
145th Street (SR 523) looking westbound toward Interstate 5

State Route 523 (SR 523) begins at an intersection with SR 99 and North 145th Street at the northern Seattle and southern Shoreline city limits; at the SR 99 intersection, the highway is named 145th Street. From its western terminus, the roadway travels east to 1st Avenue NE, where SR 523 becomes Northeast 145th Street, which the road keeps until its eastern terminus. The highway travels 0.20 miles (0.32 km) east to interchange with Interstate 5 (I-5), where the northbound ramps are accessed through nearby 5th Avenue Northeast. After the I-5 interchange, the road forms the northern boundary of the Jackson Park Golf Course and later continues to SR 522 at the northern Seattle, southern Shoreline and western Lake Forest Park city limits. The SR 523 / I-5 interchange was used by an estimated 28,000 motorists daily based on annual average daily traffic (AADT) data collected by the Washington State Department of Transportation.

== History ==
145th Street was paved by the King County government between 1934 and 1935. The Washington State Legislature first established a state-maintained highway on a section of present-day SR 523 in 1937, with the establishment of Secondary State Highway 1J (SSH 1J), which ran from Downtown Seattle to Primary State Highway 1 (PSH 1) in North Seattle, via the current 0.05-mile (0.08 km) long section of SR 523 from I-5 to 5th Avenue Northeast. During the 1964 highway renumbering, SSH 1J became SR 513 and PSH 1 became I-5; the northern terminus of SR 513 became the current SR 523 / I-5 interchange. In 1991, the northern terminus of SR 513 was moved south to its current location, Magnuson Park and SR 523 was established.

== Major intersections ==
The entire route is in King County.

Location	mi	km	Destinations	Notes
Seattle–Shoreline city line	0.00	0.00	Northwest 145th Street – Seattle; SR 99 (Aurora Avenue North) – Seattle, Lynnwood, Everett	
Seattle–Shoreline city line	0.95	1.53	I-5 – Seattle, Everett, Bellingham	I-5 exit 175.
Seattle–Shoreline city line	1.00	1.61	5th Avenue Northeast – Seattle, Shoreline	Former SR 513
Seattle–Shoreline city line	2.45	3.94	SR 522 (Lake City Way Northeast) – Seattle, Bothell, Monroe; Northeast 145th Street – Seattle	
1.000 mi = 1.609 km; 1.000 km = 0.621 mi
