= Boeing Creek =

Stream in Shoreline, United States

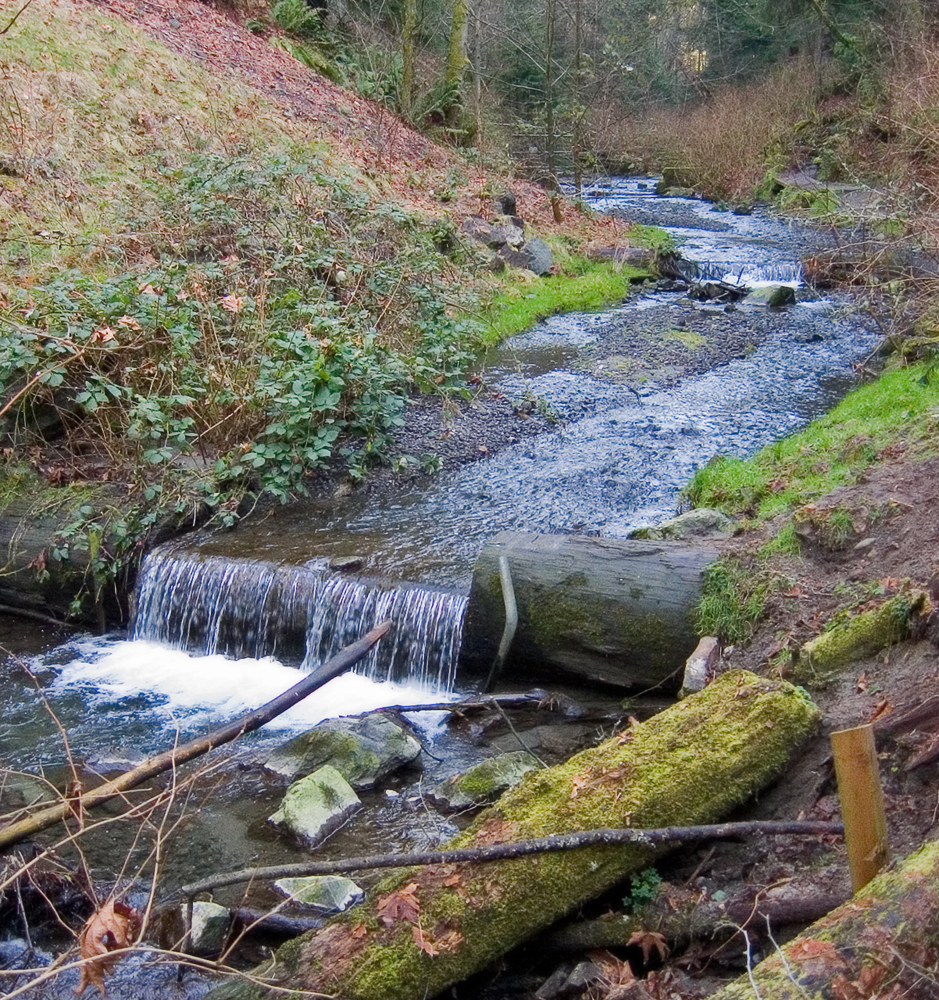
- Boeing Creek flowing over a man-made notched log, upstream from former Hidden Lake

- Location of the mouth of Boeing Creek in Washington Boeing Creek (the United States)
- Etymology: William Boeing

Location
- Country: United States
- State: Washington
- County: King

Physical characteristics
- Source: Shoreline
  - location: Greenwood Ave and Carlyle Hall Rd, King County, Washington
  - coordinates: 47°45′2″N 122°21′27″W
  - elevation: 380 ft (120 m)
- Mouth: Puget Sound
  - location: King County, Washington
  - coordinates: 47°44′57″N 122°22′56″W
  - elevation: 0 ft (0 m)
- Length: 1.6 mi (2.6 km)
- Basin size: 11.74 sq mi (30.4 km^{2})
- Discharge
  - location: Gage 04j at river mile 0.4
  - average: 2.7 cu ft/s (0.076 m^{3}/s)
  - minimum: 1.06 cu ft/s (0.030 m^{3}/s)
  - maximum: 16.86 cu ft/s (0.477 m^{3}/s)

Boeing Creek is a stream in the U.S. state of Washington, located in the city of Shoreline, just north of Seattle. It is about 1.6 miles (2.6 km) long and empties into Puget Sound. The creek is heavily modified along its course, and in many places has been diverted into culverts. The watershed of Boeing Creek is about 11.2 square miles (29 km^{2}) in size, with two main tributaries aside from the mainstem. The creek takes its name from William Boeing, who built a mansion along the creek in 1913. Despite the river modifications and stormwater pollution, the creek supports a variety of riparian habitats, native animals and fishes.

== Course ==
Boeing Creek's original headwaters have been placed into underground pipes. The creek's main stem emerges from storm drain culverts at the intersection of Greenwood Ave and Carlyle Hall Road, which is considered its source, 47.750653°N 122.357629°W. The creek flows along the Shoreline Community College campus, through Boeing Creek Park (the northern part of Shoreview Park). At the west end of the park the creek flows through the former site of Hidden Lake, 47.7514864°N 122.3712408°W. Boeing Creek continues through a culvert under Innis Arden Way and flows west through a ravine and under BNSF's railroad tracks before emptying into Puget Sound.

There are two main tributary forks of Boeing Creek. The northern fork emerges from a culvert in Boeing Creek Park. Its water comes from drainage pipes beneath 6th Avenue. This fork joins the main stem in Boeing Creek Park. Another tributary fork rises in the neighborhoods of Shoreview Hills and The Highlands and flows north to join Boeing Creek below the site of the former Hidden Lake.

The lowermost portion of Boeing Creek flows between the neighborhoods of The Highlands and Innis Arden. The Highlands is an exclusive gated community designed by the Olmsted Brothers in 1909. This portion of the creek is not accessible to the public.

During high flow events, additional water from pipes beneath 175th Street enters Boeing Creek Park, flowing into a stormwater detention basin, then into the northern fork of Boeing Creek.

=== Discharge ===
King County operated six stream gages on Boeing Creek during the 1990s. Gage 04j, called "Boeing Creek off Beach DR", was the farthest downstream at approximately river mile 0.4. It operated from August 7, 1991, to March 19, 1993. The maximum daily discharge measured was 16.86 cu ft/s (0.477 m^{3}/s). The minimum daily discharge was 1.06. The mean discharge over the life of the gage was 2.7 cu ft/s (0.076 m^{3}/s).

== Watershed ==
According to Rich Ellison, Boeing Creek's watershed is 11.74 square miles (30.4 km^{2}) large and includes 3.4 miles (5.5 km) of Puget Sound shoreline. The watershed is almost entirely within the city of Shoreline, reaching north nearly to the Snohomish County line. Its southern extent reaches slightly into the city of Seattle. Boeing Creek's watershed borders, to the west, the watersheds of McAleer Creek, Thornton Creek, and Lyons Creek. King County maps Boeing Creek's watershed slightly differently. According to King County the watershed is completely contained within the City of Shoreline.

== History ==
In 1913 William Boeing, founder of the Boeing company, had a mansion built in The Highlands neighborhood, along Boeing Creek. He lived by himself until 1921, when he married and started a family. In time the creek came to be named after Boeing. Earlier names included Hidden Creek and Hidden Lake Creek. The senior water rights on the stream, those of William Boeing and the Seattle Golf and Country Club, call it "unnamed stream". The official USGS name, Boeing Creek, was entered into the GNIS database on September 10, 1979. Boeing owned much of the lower creek, including today's Shoreview and Boeing Creek Parks. He used the land primarily as a hunting retreat and had a small dam made, creating Hidden Lake which he used as a private fishing pond. In the 1930s Boeing platted and logged 400 acres (1.6 km^{2}) north of Boeing Creek and sold the land to developers. The Innis Arden neighborhood began to be developed on this land after World War II. The land that today is Boeing Creek Park was partially logged, leaving a number of large mature conifers, some over 200 feet (61 m) tall. It is unclear why the area was only partially logged. The steep slopes may have made it too costly to fully log.

Much of Boeing Creek's upper course is within Boeing Creek Park, the northern part of Shoreview Park. Run by the City of Shoreline, these parks together span 88 acres (360,000 m^{2}). William Boeing transferred the land that is now Shoreview Park to the Shoreline School District. In the mid-1970s land was cleared south of Hidden Lake for the construction of Shoreview High School. Funding failed and the school was never built. The cleared and terraced site has become infested with invasive species such as Scotch broom and Himalayan blackberry. In 1977 King County purchased the land from the Shoreline School District and established Shoreview Park. The City of Shoreline assumed ownership of Shoreview Park and adjoining Boeing Creek Park in 1997. Trails in these parks allow access to the middle portion of Boeing Creek. A few trails are official and maintained, including one that runs along the creek. There are a large number of "social trails" as well, which often climb steep, unstable slopes, increasing erosion and overall stream degradation. Every part of the creek is accessible. There are people living along the lake in houses, and so that part is theirs.

== Geology ==
The geology of the Boeing Creek's watershed is dominated by sands, gravels, and silts created during the last glacial period. Materials present include subglacial tills made up of silt, sand, and gravel particles; advance outwash deposits, made up of well-sorted sands and gravels; and transitional beds, made up of compacted clay, silt, and sometimes sand.

== Natural history ==
=== Fish ===
Salmonid use that has been documented in Boeing Creek include chinook (Oncorhynchus tshawytscha), chum (Oncorhynchus keta) and coho salmon (Oncorhynchus kisutch), and sea run coastal cutthroat trout (Oncorhynchus clarki clarki). A study done in 1994 found juvenile coho salmon in the lower portion of Boeing Creek, below the Seattle Golf Course Dam. The same study found cutthroat trout in most of Boeing Creek, up to the King County M1 R/D pond, near the creek's source. The Salmon Watchers Program have observed a site on river mile 0.1 of Boeing Creek since 2000. Coho and chum salmon are commonly seen, with fish counts ranging up to 160 chum salmon in 2003 and 89 coho salmon in 2001. Two chinook salmon were observed in 2000.

Fish populations are hindered by two storm water detention systems: the M-1 Dam (or "Boeing Creek Detention Facility"), an in-stream retention device on the main fork, and the Retention-Detention Ponds, an off-channel system in Boeing Creek Park. Two other structures influence stream ecology: An artificial waterfall, about ten feet high, constructed from concrete, just downstream from Innis Arden Way; and the "Seattle Country Club Golf Course Dam", a metal dam and pump station about 200 meters downstream of Innis Arden Way, which forms of reservoir that supplies the Seattle Country Club golf course with irrigation water. None of the dams provide fish passage and therefore present a total barrier, limiting stream use by anadromous species to the lower third of the creek.

=== Vegetation ===
The riparian forest along Boeing Creek in Boeing Creek Park is an intact native ecosystem, mostly free of invasive species. There are a number of mature conifers that escaped being logged, including 200-foot (61 m) tall Douglas-fir and Western White Pine trees. Salmonberry shrubs are common along the creek. In some areas invasive species such as Scotch broom, Himalayan blackberry, English ivy, and Herb Robert are present. The native species of Sword fern and Stinging nettle are common.

== Modifications ==
Early modifications of Boeing Creek include the logging of the creek's watershed, the creation of Hidden Lake, and the construction of the Seattle Country Club Golf Course Dam. The creek's mouth was crossed by railway tracks, today owned by BNSF, running along the edge of Puget Sound.

In the 1960s a Sears mall complex was built at Aurora Avenue and 160th Street, covering Boeing Creek's wetland headwaters. This and other urban development placed about 2 miles (3.2 km) of what had been upper Boeing Creek into a patchwork of pipes, most of which are on private property. Within this area there is one 400-foot (120 m) segment that flows free from pipes, located in Darnell Park. However a lack of detention facilities and an undersized pipe causes flooding in the vicinity of Darnell Park and contributes to erosive flows downstream. The City of Shoreline is planning on improving the drainage and reducing downstream erosion by building a detention basin and replacing the pipe.

The creek's watershed was heavily urbanized after World War II, altering the runoff and discharge patterns. Increased runoff into Boeing Creek during rainy weather has caused more intense erosion and sediment transport, leading to the build-up of sediment in Hidden Lake. In the 1970s heavy rains flushed enough sediment down the creek to completely fill Hidden Lake, which became a meadow. Subsequently, King County Surface Water Division began efforts to control stormwater runoff in Boeing Creek's watershed. In 1996 dredging work restored Hidden Lake. On January 1, 1997, a winter storm created a large sinkhole which ruptured sewer lines on 175th Street, resulting in the Hidden Lake being filled with sediment again. The lake was dredged and restored again. The lake was repeatedly dredged until 2013, after which dredging stopped while the city planned the removal of the lake.

King County built a stormwater control system in Boeing Creek Park. A large detention basin stores water during storms, reducing the creek's flood risk. The detention basin is augmented by an underground storage pipe designed to temporarily store up to 500,000 gallons of wastewater during large storms. This storage pipe is located under the detention basin in Boeing Creek Park. The pipe is 12 feet (3.7 m) in diameter and about 640 feet (200 m) long. Completed in 2007 by King County Public Works, the pipe's purpose is to help keep wastewater within the sewer system and reduce overflows into Puget Sound. The pipe conveys wastewater to the Hidden Lake Pump Station. At the same time the Hidden Lake Pump Station, located on the former site of Hidden Lake, was replaced in order to increase capacity. The old pump station lacked capacity, resulting in about three overflows into Puget Sound per year. Another related wastewater project is the Boeing Creek Trunk Sewer Replacement. A major wastewater conveyance pipe, the Boeing Creek Trunk (BCT) was under capacity and had deteriorated with age. During heavy rain storms wastewater sometimes overflowed from manholes and into Puget Sound. These projects were all part of the Hidden Lake Pump Station replacement and sewer improvement project. Construction of this overall project began in 2006. The underground storage pipe in Boeing Creek Park was finished in 2007, Boeing Creek Trunk in 2008, and the Hidden Lake Pump Station in 2009. All of these wastewater systems are located very close to Boeing Creek, although the Boeing Creek Trunk extends north out of the creek's watershed. The City of Shoreline is planning additional stormwater management projects to reduce flooding and improve Boeing Creek's hydrology. Construction of the Pan Terra Pond and Pump Improvement Project began in 2009.

In 2023, the City of Shoreline removed the Hidden Lake Dam, and Hidden Lake itself, as a permanent solution to sediment buildup in Hidden Lake. The removal also improves fish habitats and water quality downstream of the former site of the lake by allowing natural sediment movement. As part of the same project, the City is improving the walking trails around the former site of the lake and replacing the culvert under Innis Arden Way. The culvert replacement, the main remaining task, is planned to be completed in 2024.

== See also ==
- List of rivers of Washington (state)
- Thornton Creek
