= Boeing Creek and Shoreview Park =

Park system in Shoreline, Washington

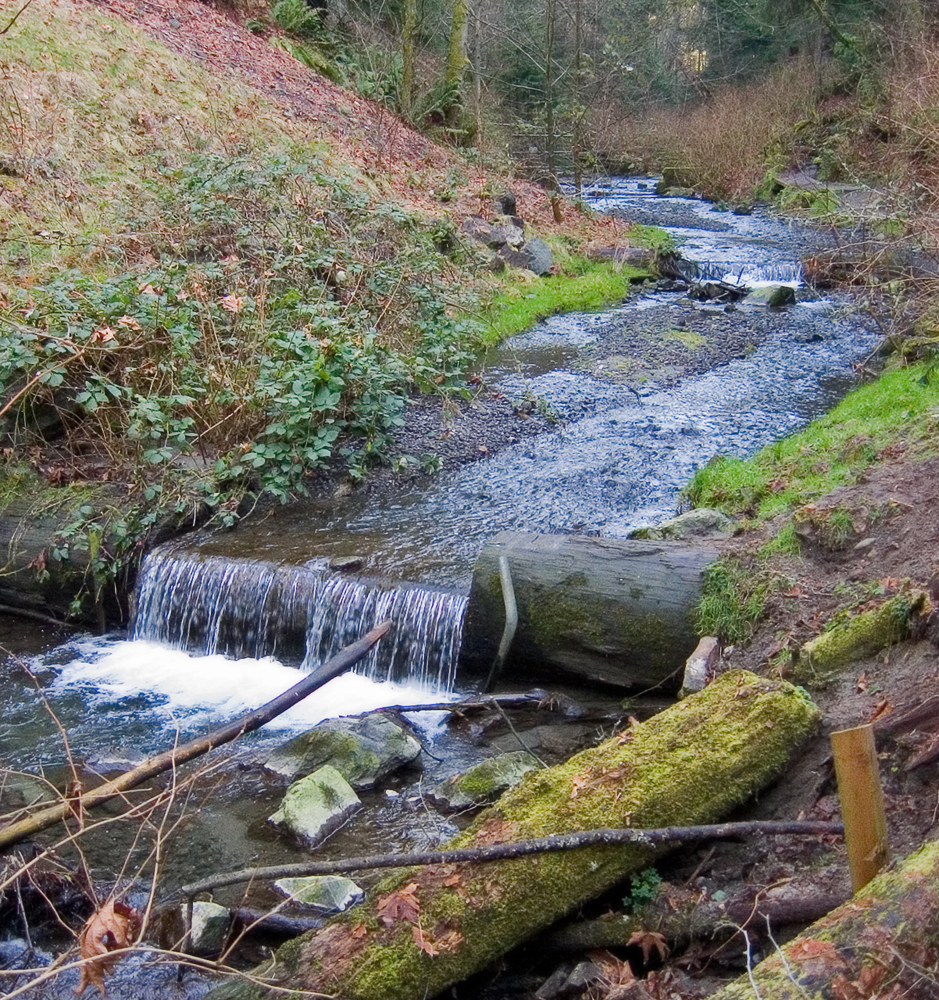
- Boeing Creek.
- Interactive map of Boeing Creek and Shoreview Park
- Location: Shoreline, Washington, United States
- Coordinates: 47°45′09″N 122°21′57″W
- Operator: City of Shoreline

Boeing Creek and Shoreview Park is an 88-acre (360,000 m^{2}) park system located within Shoreline, Washington. The two parks share an internal border and both border Shoreline Community College. Boeing Creek Park mainly consists of forested areas, while Shoreview Park contains recreational facilities including tennis courts, baseball and soccer fields and an off-leash dog area. The upper portion of Boeing Creek flows along the western edge of both Boeing Creek and Shoreview Park.

== Natural history ==
=== Flora ===
Boeing Creek park has a largely intact native ecosystem, mostly free of invasive species. Habitats within Boeing Creek Park consist of coniferous forest, coniferous-deciduous forest, deciduous forest, and riparian forest along Boeing Creek. The conifer forest includes Douglas-fir, western hemlock and western red cedar trees. There are a number of mature conifers that escaped being logged, with some 200-foot (61 m) tall Douglas-fir trees. Salmonberry shrubs are common along the creek, the native species of sword fern and stinging nettle are common.

Shoreview Park habitats are Conifer-deciduous forest, conifer-madrone forest, grassland, shrubland, and developed areas. Twelve acres of Shoreview Park contains invasive species such as butterfly bush, Scotch broom, Himalayan blackberry, English ivy, and herb Robert.

=== Fauna ===
Boeing Creek and Shoreview Park are home to numerous bird species. Great blue herons, bald eagles, and pileated woodpeckers have been observed within Boeing Creek Park. Rough-skinned newts have been spotted along inlets to Boeing Creek.

== History ==
In 1913 William Boeing, founder of the Boeing company, had a mansion built in The Highlands neighborhood, along Boeing Creek. Boeing owned the land that includes today's Shoreview and Boeing Creek Parks. He used the land primarily as a hunting retreat and had a small dam constructed, creating Hidden Lake which he used as a private fishing pond. In the 1930s Boeing platted and logged 400 acres (1.6 km^{2}) north of Boeing Creek and sold much of his land to developers. The Innis Arden neighborhood began to be developed on this land after World War II. He donated the land that makes up Shoreview Park to the Shoreline School District. In 1997, the city of Shoreline assumed ownership of both parks.

In 2023, the city of Shoreline removed the Hidden Lake dam to restore the old stream and began substantial trail improvements around the former site of the lake. The primary reason for the dam removal was sediment buildup in the lake that was difficult to manage. Other reasons for the removal include improving fish habitats and water quality downstream of the lake. The remaining work was planned to be completed in 2024, but was delayed to 2026.
