= Mike Daisey =

American monologist, author, and actor

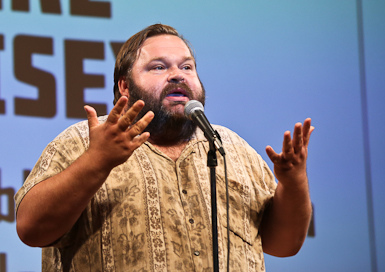
- Daisey speaking in 2013
- Born: January 21, 1976 (age 50); Fort Kent, Maine, U.S.
- Occupations: Monologist; author; actor

Mike Daisey (born January 21, 1976) is an American monologist, author, and actor. His monologue The Agony and the Ecstasy of Steve Jobs, about the labor conditions under which Apple devices are made, was used as the basis for a widely shared episode of the radio program This American Life, but the episode was later retracted for its factual inaccuracy after it was discovered that Daisey had lied about his experiences.

== Career ==
=== Early monologues ===
Daisey's early work includes Wasting Your Breath (1997), a monologue of the Great American Roadtrip, and I Miss the Cold War (1998), about Daisey's visit to post-Communist Warsaw and Cold War themes.

His 2001 monologue 21 Dog Years was Daisey's break. In 2002, Daisey published a book version of the tale under the same title, and in 2004 the BBC aired his radio adaptation of his monologue on Radio 4.

Daisey performed several non-traditional monologues during the 2000s. For All Stories Are Fiction (2004), Daisey made no notes of any kind until one hour before the performance, and then created a show extemporaneously onstage. Similarly, in Mysteries of the Unexplained (2009), he performed a series of one-night-only performances, about Facebook, bacon, and the Boardwalk. Daisey presented his 24-hour monologue All the Hours in the Day (2011) at Portland's TBA Festival in September 2011, emphasizing themes of loss, transformation, and the desire for authenticity.

=== Invincible Summer ===
Invincible Summer (2007) is about the history of the New York City transit system, loss, and democracy in modern-day America.

The April 19, 2007 performance of Invincible Summer at the American Repertory Theater in Cambridge, Massachusetts, was disrupted when over 80 audience members from Norco High School in Norco, California, left the production mid-performance, after teachers and chaperones decided that they had heard too many obscenities. One parent approached the stage and poured water over Daisey's outline notes; Daisey said that the destroyed papers were the original copy of the show's outline. He described the effect of the walk-out as "shocking". Daisey later sought out and spoke with representatives of the group, including the member who destroyed his notes.

=== The Agony and the Ecstasy of Steve Jobs ===
The Agony and the Ecstasy of Steve Jobs (2010) examines globalization by exploring the exploitation of Chinese workers through the lens of what Daisey describes as "the rise and fall and rise of Apple, industrial design, and the human price we are willing to pay for our technology, woven together in a complex narrative."

In January 2012, portions of the theatrical monologue were aired on the radio program This American Life. The episode, titled "Mr. Daisey and the Apple Factory" quickly became the most downloaded episode in the show's history, with 888,000 downloads after two months. Two months later, This American Life officially retracted the episode, having discovered that some of the personal experiences described by Daisey in his monologue had been exaggerated or fabricated. A follow-up episode, entitled "Retraction", stood by the veracity of the claims Daisey had made about working conditions at Foxconn, but claimed Daisey had dramatized many of the personal details of his own experiences visiting China in his monologue. Daisey was accused of exaggerating the number of plants, people, and underaged workers he talked to, of claiming that the plant guards had guns, and of describing a worker with a crippled hand using an iPad for the first time as a Foxconn employee. This American Life also accused Daisey of purposely misleading them by trying to prevent them from contacting the translator he used in order to fact check his story. In an interview with host Ira Glass, Daisey admitted to giving the producers of This American Life a false name for the translator and also admitted that he lied about her contact information being changed. Daisey apologized to This American Life for allowing them to use his theatrical monologue in the "Retraction" program, and made a full apology in a statement on his website.

Since the controversy, Daisey has reformed his work and has continued to perform it, removing the five minutes of contested details and standing by his assertions that the conditions in Apple's supply chain violate China's own labor laws and remain inhumane. He has performed this new version in six cities, including a run at Washington, D.C.'s Woolly Mammoth Theater, where Apple's co-founder Steve Wozniak joined the show for a post-performance discussion on August 4, 2012.

In 2013, solo theatre artist Jade Esteban Estrada embarked on a five-city tour of the show. "Jade Esteban Estrada knows how to draw an audience in and hold them in the palm of his hand," wrote Deborah Martin of the San Antonio Express-News. He puts that skill to fine use in The Agony and the Ecstasy of Steve Jobs, a solo show written by Mike Daisey exploring the cult of tech giant Apple.

Daisey offers a complete, royalty-free transcript of The Agony, which has been downloaded over 130,000 times. The work has had more than 40 productions, and it has been translated into six languages.

=== Post-controversy monologues ===
Performed at Spoleto Festival USA, ArtsEmerson, the Cape Cod Theatre Project, and Woolly Mammoth Theater, The Orient Express (Or, the Value of Failure) (2012) is Daisey's story of the aftermath of his media scandal, and a trip he took to recreate the Orient Express, traveling from Paris to Istanbul.

American Utopias (2012) is Daisey's monologue about the way that physical spaces influence people's shared goals, using modern American utopian models including Disney World, the Burning Man Festival, and Zuccotti Park and the birth of the Occupy movement.

"Fucking Fucking Fucking Ayn Rand" (2013) tackles Ayn Rand, the author of The Fountainhead and Atlas Shrugged and the creator of the Objectivist movement. The SunBreak described Daisey's performance as being "not as viscerally worked up as he has been elsewhere".

=== Theatre and film ===
Daisey's first play The Moon Is a Dead World premiered at the Annex Theatre in Seattle, Washington on October 17, 2008. It was previously developed at Soho Rep as a part of their 2008–2009 Writer/Director Lab Readings in a workshop directed by Maria Goyanes.

Layover, Daisey's first film, was screened at the 2010 Cannes Film Festival. He also stars in the feature film Horrible Child with T. Ryder Smith, in an adaptation of Lawrence Krauser's play.

== Themes ==
Jason Zinoman of the New York Times describes Daisey as having "a preoccupation with alternative histories, secrets large and small, and the fuzzy line where truth and fiction blur."

Zinoman further expands on a common theme in which Daisey experiences "a mania in which he loses himself", in 21 Dog Years and Invincible Summer.

Theater itself appears in Daisey's work, in both The Ugly American (2003), about Daisey's life as a 19-year-old drama student in London, and How Theater Failed America (2008), a monologue critical of how modern theater has lost sight of its original mission.

Critical analysis of powerful men and institutions often feature in his work. Monopoly! (2005) is critical of capitalism and details the rivalry between Edison and Tesla, while Great Men of Genius (2006) profiled Bertolt Brecht, showman P.T. Barnum, scientist Nikola Tesla and Scientology founder L. Ron Hubbard. If You See Something Say Something (2008), critical of the Department of Homeland Security, compares it to the days of tense alert during the Cold War.

== Reception ==
Jason Zinoman said about Daisey's work in the New York Times: "The master storyteller...one of the finest solo performers of his generation. What distinguishes him from most solo performers is how elegantly he blends personal stories, historical digressions and philosophical ruminations. He has the curiosity of a highly literate dilettante and a preoccupation with alternative histories, secrets large and small, and the fuzzy line where truth and fiction blur. Mr. Daisey's greatest subject is himself." Louise Kennedy described his monologues in the Boston Globe as "Sharp-witted, passionately delivered talk about matters both small and huge, at once utterly individual and achingly universal." Heidi Weiss in the Chicago Sun-Times has said, "Enthralling...why be a journalist when you can spin stories like these?"

While remaining optimistic about Daisey's ability to recover from the Agony scandal, Jason Zinoman, writing at Salon.com, criticized Daisey's ethics and his "defiant" insistence that the invented material was "dramatic license" rather than a lie.

== Personal life ==
Mike Daisey was born in Fort Kent, Maine, and moved to the greater Bangor area in his childhood. He grew up between Fort Kent and Madawaska, his family moving to Etna when he was twelve.

He graduated from Nokomis Regional High School, and attended Colby College in Waterville, Maine.

== Works ==
=== Monologues ===
- 1997 Wasting Your Breath
- 1998 I Miss the Cold War
- 2001 21 Dog Years
- 2003 The Ugly American
- 2004 All Stories Are Fiction
- 2005 Monopoly!
- 2006 Great Men of Genius
- 2007 Tongues Will Wag
- 2007 Invincible Summer
- 2008 How Theater Failed America
- 2008 If You See Something Say Something
- 2009 Mysteries of the Unexplained
- 2009 The Last Cargo Cult
- 2010 Barring the Unforeseen
- 2010 The Agony and the Ecstasy of Steve Jobs
- 2011 All the Hours in the Day
- 2012 The Orient Express (Or, the Value of Failure)
- 2012 American Utopias
- 2012 Where Water Meets With Water
- 2013 Fucking Fucking Fucking Ayn Rand
- 2013 Journalism
- 2013 All the Faces of the Moon
- 2014 The Story of the Gun
- 2014 Dreaming of Rob Ford
- 2014 Yes This Man
- 2014 The Great Tragedies
- 2016 The Trump Card
- 2018 A People's History
- 2020 Bad Faith

=== Plays ===
- 2008 The Moon Is a Dead World

=== Books ===
- Mike Daisey. 21 Dog Years. ISBN 0-7432-2580-5.

=== Films ===
- 2010 Layover
