= Rod Harrel =

Rod Harrel (born 1965) is an actor-writer-director in theatre, video production and film productions. He currently lives in Los Angeles.

== Biography ==
=== Early life ===
Rod Harrel was born in Yakima, Washington, the third son of Audress Harrel, a journeyman mechanic who worked at the Hanford Nuclear Reservation, and Eileen Harrel. He moved to Vancouver, Washington, with his family in 1972 and graduated from Evergreen High School in 1978. While there he studied drama for three years under teacher Jon Kerr. In college he first studied under Dr. George L. Meshke and in 1981, he received his A.A. degree from Shoreline Community College in Seattle, Washington. While in Seattle he studied under Morry Hendrickson and Willy Clarke.

=== Early career ===
Harrel made his professional stage debut on his 21st birthday in 1981 at Seattle's Brass Ring Theatre as Officer O'Hara in Joseph Kesselring's macabre comedy, Arsenic and Old Lace. In 1985, he started producing videos with his own Orthicon Ghost Productions. Harrel made his stage debut in Portland, Oregon, playing Carl Cooper in Douglas Gower's play Daddies at the Blue Room for Portland Civic Theatre in December 1985. "Harrel does a particularly good job of portraying a backwoods hippie-religious fanatic without making Carl seem ridiculous—indeed, he gives Carl surprising dimension." He also met two longtime collaborators: director Douglas Mouw and Cathy J. Lewis.

In 1986, he co-founded, with Cathy J. Lewis, a participatory theatre company called The Jupiter Players, which toured around the Portland area until 1988 and for which he wrote four plays. One of these plays was an early version of Trial By Error, a courtroom comedy that crossed Perry Mason with Citizen Kane. It was performed in an actual courtroom at the Clackamas County Courthouse in Oregon City.

=== Jack controversy ===
During the fall and winter of 1988, Harrel's new play, Jack—a trauma from hell in seven scenes, was produced by Playback Theatre with him directing. An updated tale based on Jack The Ripper, it was a modest success. The play was produced as a movie, which was scheduled to have its premiere as a cablecast on Multnomah County public-access television cable TV on May 26, 1989. The 70-minute video didn't even make it through one cablecast when the operators stopped the tape before the end because three viewers called to complain. The story featured male nudity and one of the comments claimed that Multnomah Cable Access was showing pornography and obscene language.

The legal department at M.C.A. felt that Jack probably violated Oregon's very liberal obscenity laws. Harrel took his case to the press and in short order, Peter Farrell, the Oregonian's television critic, penned a column. "Most of the nudity occurs in connection with discussion about sexual politics and values, which would seem to protect it from even fairly narrow views on obscenity," he wrote. "'I think people were upset by the male nudity,' said Harrel. "'Frontal male nudity is not seen very often.'" Jack then was shown on M.C.A. and eventually on Portland Cable Access and was shown as a benefit for the newly formed Stark Raving Theatre.

=== Later career ===
In 1988, while working in the box office for New Rose Theatre, Harrel met E. J. Westlake. Along with Robin Suttles, they co-founded Stark Raving Theatre, which opened in March 1989 at a basement space in the Bull Ring Restaurant in northwest Portland. All three co-founders were playwrights and from the beginning SRT was a haven for producing new works. Both Harrel, the artistic director, and Westlake, the managing director, had shows produced the first season.

As an actor, Harrel appeared in such plays as his own, Trial By Error, Cold Hands written by Paul Bernstein and Beidermann and the Firebugs. Harrel's favorite role during this time was as Bill Stultz in Westlake's play, A.E., about the disappearance of Amelia Earhart, which won Westlake the Oregon Book Award in 1992. As a playwright he has had produced such plays as Jack, Trial By Error, Now Let Me Say This About That (about the John F. Kennedy autopsy) and The Sky Cams.

From 1992 to 1994, Harrel produced and directed a 12-part series on Portland Cable Access that was created and written by E. Lauryl Nagode called The Gingerbread Man and starred Douglas Mouw. The controversial series about a serial killer caused concern among public-access television cable TV administrators in the greater Portland area. A memo about censoring public access programs that was distributed to cable operators mentioned The Gingerbread Man as a production depicting, "the life of a serial killer in his rape, mutilation and murder of victims. The show is acted out by members of a Portland-area theatre company."

Harrel also produced an anthology series from 1994 to 1996 and it was profiled in the short-lived arts newspaper Tonic in the summer of 1995. "The series draws on members of the local theatre community and the results are surprisingly decent. The individual performances may be the most assured on Public-access television, and many of the episodes do manage to invoke a certain eeriness."

After founding a Grand Guignol-style theatre in 1997, Harrel took a break to concentrate on songwriting and returned to theatre and video productions in 2005. The Willamette Week noted his recent work as King Berenger I in Eugène Ionesco's Exit the King that was produced by Arts Equity Theatre in 2008 and directed by Llewellyn J. Rhoe. "King Berenger (Rod Harrel) and his court speak with thick Texas accents and Berenger himself makes apelike facial expressions and frequently lets fly a sinister airy cackle-heh heh heh-that will be instantly familiar to anyone with a TV." Since 2008, he has also worked behind-the-scenes for the Wanderlust Circus and The Circus Project and continues to produce videos on the YouTube channel Orthicon Ghost. In 2012, he left Portland for Los Angeles to get work.
