= The Peanut Man =

The Peanut Man may refer to:

- Rick Kaminski (1944-2011), Seattle stadium vendor and businessman
- The Peanut Man (film), about George Washington Carver
