= Lincoln High School (Seattle, Washington) =

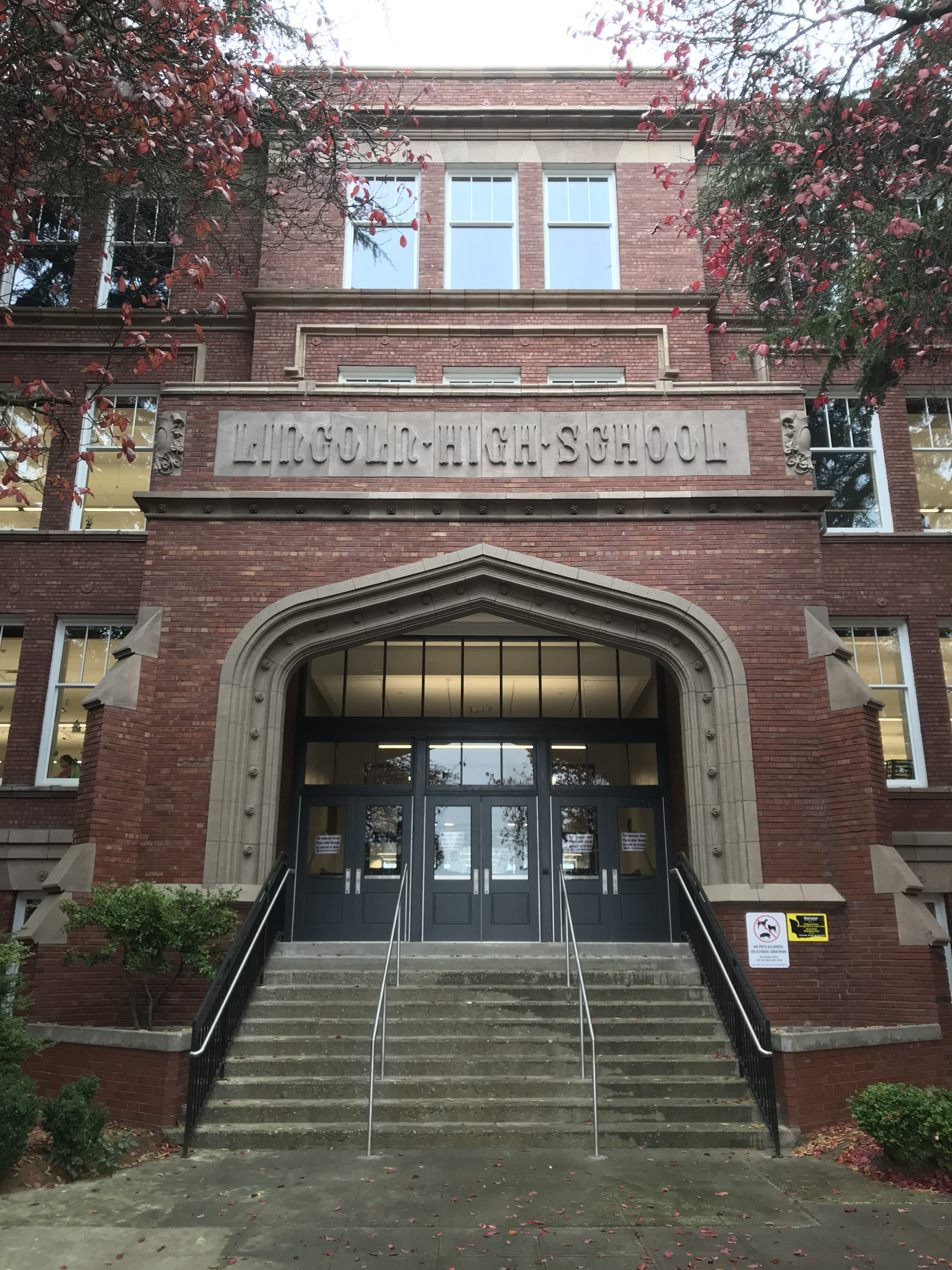
- Historic entry in 2019

Location
- 4400 Interlake Avenue N Seattle, Washington 98103; United States; 47.6600°N 122.3397°W

Information
- Type: Public
- Motto: Learn with passion. Act with courage. Improve the world.
- Established: 1907,119 years ago
- Status: Open
- Closed: 1981 (Reopened 2019)
- School district: Seattle Public Schools
- Principal: Corey Eichner
- Grades: 9–12
- Enrollment: 1779 (2024-2025); 2,800 at peak (1950s)
- Campus size: 6.72 acres
- Colors: Red & Black
- Mascot: Lynx
- Rivals: Ballard High School
- Newspaper: Lincoln Log; Formerly The Lincoln Totem
- Yearbook: The Totem
- Website: Official website

Lincoln High School (shortened to Lincoln High, Lincoln, or L.H.S.) is a public high school in Seattle, Washington, part of the Seattle Public Schools district and named after Abraham Lincoln, the 16th President of the United States. It is Seattle Public School's oldest operating high school.

The school initially opened in 1907. In 1981, the school closed and the building was used several times after as a temporary holding location for other schools in the district as their own buildings underwent construction. In 2019, the school reopened after renovations.

== History ==
The school was built in 1906 in the Wallingford neighborhood to handle the growth in the area. It opened in 1907 and until 1971 was a three-year senior high school (grades 10-12), thereafter a four-year high school with grades 9 to 12.

Like many Seattle schools, Lincoln was impacted by the Japanese American internment during World War II. Among those interned were the president of the boys' Lynx Club and girls' Triple L and the editor of the school newspaper, the Totem, now known as the Lincoln Log.

After the war, Edison Technical School (later Seattle Central College) on Seattle's Capitol Hill neighborhood expanded and took over the facilities of Broadway High School, mainly to serve returning veterans. Broadway's regular high school student body were all transferred to Lincoln High. For some years after the war, Lincoln also served the city of Shoreline, until that suburb built its own public high school. In 1948, during the national "Red Scare" controversy, the school was receiving letters warning of communists within the teaching staff. In 1949, during a tuberculosis outbreak, Lincoln sent teachers to Firland Sanatorium, and patients earned Lincoln diplomas.

=== Closure ===
Lincoln High School was closed in 1981 due to declining enrollment. At the time the decision was made to shutter Lincoln, the Totem newspaper had been rated All-American status by the National Scholastic Press Association seven semesters in a row, and it had a notable arts magnet program and an excellent special education program.

In the years after its closure, the Lincoln High building was used by various community and religious organizations, including the Wallingford Boys and Girls Club. In 1988, the derelict building was used as the filming location for the dystopian 1990 science fiction action movie Class of 1999. A 1993 plan would have renovated Lincoln as a new home for Hamilton Middle School, also setting aside part of the building for community services. Instead, it became an interim location for various other schools over the next few decades. The building housed Ballard High School in 1997–1999 while their current facility was being built, then the Latona Elementary School (1999–2000). It next housed Roosevelt High School in 2004–2006 and Garfield High School in 2006–2008 while their respective buildings were being renovated and upgraded. September 2009 to June 2010, Lincoln was the home to the Hamilton International Middle School while the Hamilton building was renovated and housed the recently split APP North middle school cohort for one year with Hamilton in 2009-2010. It then became the site for Lincoln Elementary School, which was renamed to Cascadia Elementary School and relocated to a new building to make room for the reopened Lincoln High School.

=== Reopening ===
The school was reopened as a comprehensive high school in the fall of 2019 after being closed in 1981 and being comprehensively renovated in 2017-2019. The school re-opened with grades 9-10 but has now reached the full capacity of four grades.

== Facilities ==
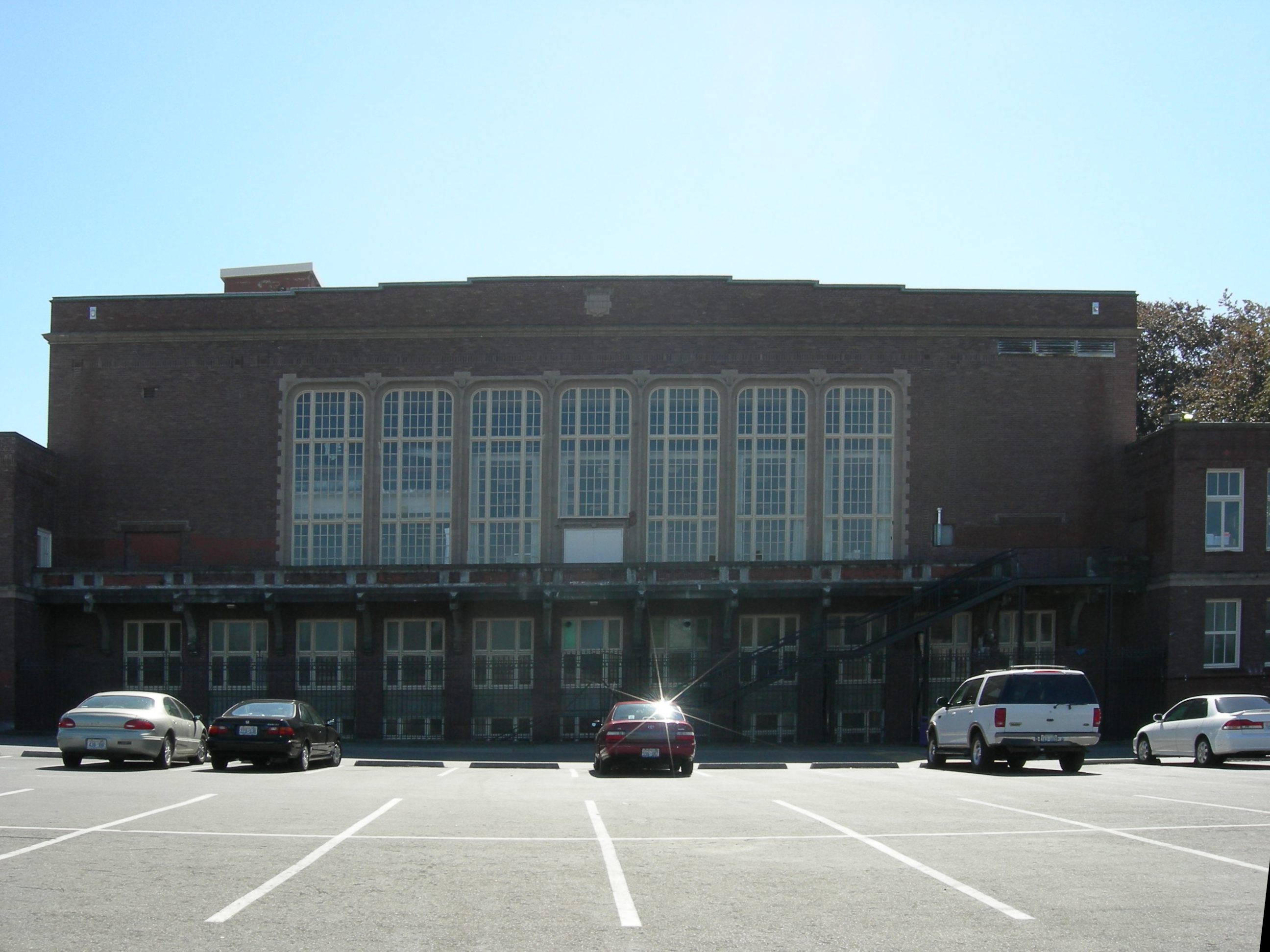
North facade with Library windows in 2007

Lincoln High School comprises five main buildings on a single campus. The three western buildings (built in 1907, 1914-1920, and 1930) are co-joined and form a cohesive historic presence facing Interlake Avenue North. The two eastern buildings are stand-alone structures constructed in the late 1950s and opened in 1959, today housing the Gymnasium and CTE/Performing arts buildings.

Between 1914 and 1920, the north wing and several other minor additions were added by Stephen’s architectural successor, Edgar Blair. The 1930 south wing was added by Stephen’s successor, Floyd A. Naramore.

The school’s property for its campus was also enlarged in 1957 to cover 6.72 acres. Since then the playfield has been replaced by a paved parking area.

A bronze bust of a young Abraham Lincoln, sculpted in 1964 by Avard Fairbanks, stood on the east side of the school until its relocation into a new entryway in 2019.

The 2017-2019 renovation to the historic buildings included relocating the main entry away from the historic entry, restoring the historic library, creating a new two-story central commons space, and upgrading the structure, mechanical and electrical systems, and providing new energy-efficient windows and exterior walls.

=== Areas Served ===
Lincoln's attendance zone spans multiple neighborhoods, and includes Queen Anne, Wallingford, Fremont, as well as parts of Green Lake, University District and Ballard. Prior to Lincoln's re-opening, the majority of students now zoned for Lincoln would be assigned to either Roosevelt High School in Ravenna, or Ballard High School.

=== Academics ===
Lincoln High School is a Highly Capable Cohort pathway school, and has classes to support students who require or are interested in an accelerated academic path. In addition to standard courses, students can opt for honors classes or from a substantial number of rigorous AP classes, including AP Calculus BC, AP Physics, and AP US History. The 2026 U.S. News & World Report Rankings had Lincoln as #1 in Seattle, and #4 in Washington State in their public high school rankings.

== Athletics ==
Lincoln competes in WIAA Class 4A and is a member of the Metro League in District Two. As of the fall of 2024, Lincoln was the largest Seattle High School (by enrollment) and was the only 4A school in the Metro League.

=== State championships ===
- Baseball: 2023
- Boys basketball: 1945, 1956, 1957
- Boys soccer: 2023

== Notable alumni ==
- Kay Bell, American football player in the National Football League (NFL) with the Detroit Lions, Chicago Bears and New York Giants in the 1930s and a professional wrestler.
- Eddie Carlson, chair of the World's Fair Commission, for Seattle's Century 21 Exposition in 1962 and later president and chief executive officer of United Airlines and its later holding company U.A.L, Inc.
- Don Coryell, professional football coach in the National Football League (NFL) with the St. Louis Cardinals and San Diego Chargers
- Anita White, American blues singer and activist
- Rick "The Peanut Man" Kaminski (1944-2011), beloved Safeco Field sports stadium food hawker.
- John Franklin Koenig, artist.
- Phyllis Lamphere, former president of Seattle City Council and first female president of the National League of Cities
- Betty MacDonald, author of The Egg and I.
- Helene Madison, three-time 1932 Olympics gold-medal winner in swimming, graduated Class of 1931.
- Dorothy Provine, television and film actress.
- Bernice Stern, first woman elected to the King County Council.
- Ralph Weymouth, Vice Admiral, USN, attended, but moved before graduating.
- Rich Hand, former Major League Baseball pitcher
- Lynn Woolsey, former ten-term California congresswoman.
