= Rick Kaminski =

American stadium food hawker

Kaminski's death was noted with a cover feature in the September 2011 edition of the independent Mariners magazine The Grand Salami.

Richard J. "Rick" Kaminski (1944–2011) was a printer, real estate agent, and stadium food hawker. Kaminski is best remembered as "The Peanut Man", a comedic trick-toss expert who used a variety of styles to hurl packages of peanuts to customers in the stands of the Kingdome and Safeco Field at the games of the Seattle Mariners for more than three decades. Kaminski practiced his unique art from the time of the team's entry into the ranks of Major League Baseball in 1977 until the time of his death, during which time he became one of the informal public faces of the franchise.

== Biography ==
=== Early years ===
Kaminski was born in Seattle, Washington, in 1944. Kaminski attended King's Garden, a private Christian school in North Seattle before graduating from Seattle's Lincoln High School, Class of 1962. In high school Kaminski was a right-handed pitcher on the baseball team — an athletic assignment that would train him well for future endeavors.

Kaminski was a veteran of the United States Army during the Vietnam War. Following his return from his stint in the Army, Kaminski returned to his native Seattle and enrolled at Shoreline Community College, located just north of the city. There he was elected class president in 1973.

=== Career ===
In 1977, Seattle was granted a new franchise and team by Major League Baseball to replace the departed Seattle Pilots, eight years before, who played the 1969 baseball season here before departing to become the Milwaukee Brewers. Kaminski, who was working as a printer with designs on becoming an attorney in the future, took a part-time job as a food vendor in the stands of the King County Stadium for the new franchise, the Seattle Mariners.

Kaminski began his storied career as a stadium hawker selling beer — one of the more lucrative sales tasks for the commissioned vendors. However, after missing a number of shifts in order to play competitive tennis, he was demoted to selling lower-priced items.

Selling each bag of peanuts proved time-consuming, as money was slowly passed from hand to hand, after which the product slowly made the trip in the other direction. In an effort to speed up this process, Kaminski began launching peanut bags through the air to his customers, a technique which proved to be not only faster but which entertained the crowd, boosting sales. Speeding up the process further, in later years Kaminski frequently made use of a tennis ball into which was cut a slit for the insertion of cash for the aerial completion of financial transactions.

Over time, Kaminski developed a repertoire of more complex throws, meant to be more entertaining. His effort resulted in his tosses being occasionally documented on ESPN SportsCenter's nightly highlight reels. To fans, he was known for his uncanny accuracy and a steady stream of humorous banter which he exchanged with his audience.

Kaminski's trademark peanut toss was a behind-the-back line drive thrown for distance with velocity — with a Mariners scout clocking one such Kaminski throw at 72 miles per hour (116 km/h) with a radar gun. Other Kaminski creations included the "Sky Bag", the "Curve Bag", the "Long Bomb", and the "No-Look Behind The Back."

Coincident with his job as a peanut vendor, Kaminski worked as a Seattle real estate broker. When a fan asked him in the late 1980s why he needed two jobs, Rick replied, "A man can't live on peanuts alone."

=== Death and legacy ===
Kaminski died July 26, 2011, in Seattle of a brain aneurysm.

Kaminski's career was remembered at the time of his death in a statement by Mariners president Chuck Armstrong, who recalled:

Rick was a fixture at Seattle sporting events for as long as I can remember. His speed and accuracy with a bag of peanuts was matched by his quick wit and smile. He always seemed happy to see you, even if he was meeting you for the first time.

— Chuck Armstrong, KOMO-TV

The root of Kaminski's iconic status was analyzed by one Safeco denizen:

He talked quickly, in a high-pitched, slightly-nasally voice, and he didn't shy away from a little flirty talk with the ladies. He'd sometimes make comments that are likely not in the Mariner Vendors Handbook — never lewd, mind you, but if you were following the thread, not G-rated either. Rick was an individual. And that's why he was beloved. Not the speed of his peanut throws, not his banter, not his 34 years of service. It's that he was unique. It's that he took something boring and made it into something joyful. That's called art, folks. He turned his job into art.

— Seth Kolloen, The SunBreak

Kaminski's death was marked by the team with a moment of silence prior to the playing of the national anthem at the July 29, 2011, Mariners game against the visiting Tampa Bay Rays. Following this brief memorial, Mariners vendors further paid tribute to Kaminski by hurling ceremonial bags of peanuts into the crowd. Kaminski memorabilia was displayed by the team in its baseball museum and hall of fame at Safeco Field for the duration of the 2011 campaign.
