= William E. Boeing Jr. =

American businessman

William E. Boeing Jr
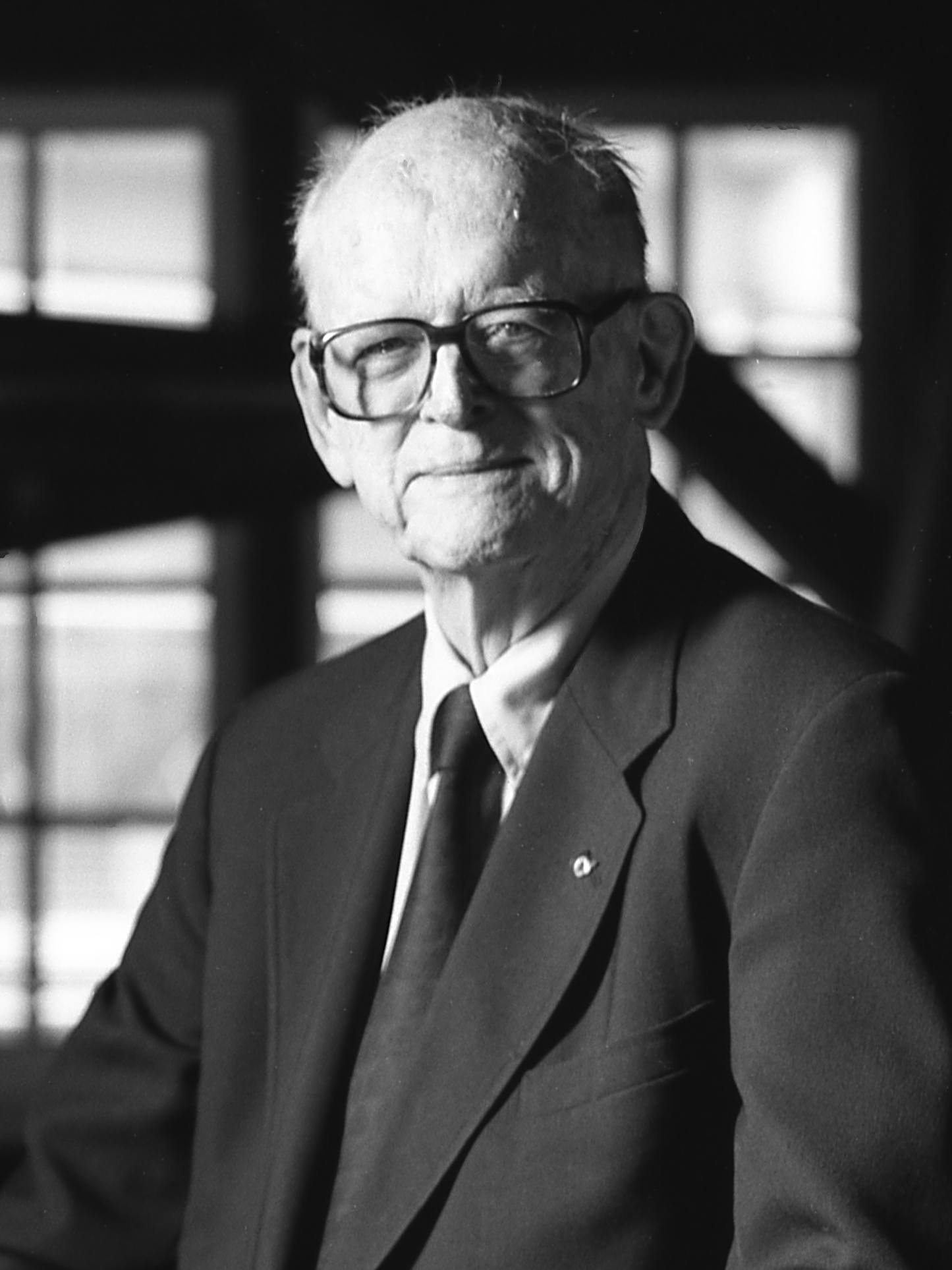
- Born: William Edward Boeing Jr. November 22, 1922; Seattle, Washington, U.S.
- Died: January 8, 2015 (aged 92); Seattle, Washington, U.S.
- Education: The Webb Schools
- Known for: Son of William E. Boeing
- Children: 4

William Edward Boeing Jr. (November 22, 1922 – January 8, 2015) was an American real estate developer and philanthropist who was the son of the aviation pioneer William E. Boeing, founder of the Boeing Company. In 2010, the American Institute of Aeronautics and Astronautics presented Boeing Jr. with a certificate of achievement for his commitment to education and the preservation of air and space history.

Boeing Jr. had fond childhood memories of the Red Barn, the birthplace of the Boeing Company, where he was once given a piece of balsa wood he crafted into a model ship. He did not understand his father's importance until his classmates nicknamed him after one of the Boeing airplanes. In the late 1970s he was instrumental in ensuring that the Red Barn, the oldest airplane manufacturing facility in the U.S., was preserved and integrated into the Seattle Museum of Flight. He died in Seattle on January 8, 2015, aged 92. Mr. Boeing’s first wife, Marcella Cech, died in 1990. His only son, William E. Boeing III, died in December 2013. His family includes his second wife, June; his daughters Gretchen Boeing Davidson, Mary Rademaker, and Susan Boeing; his stepdaughters Sandy Barnard, and Cindy Abrahamson; and 15 grandchildren and great-grandchildren.

In 2014, Boeing Jr. was inducted into the International Air & Space Hall of Fame at the San Diego Air & Space Museum.

== Philanthropy ==
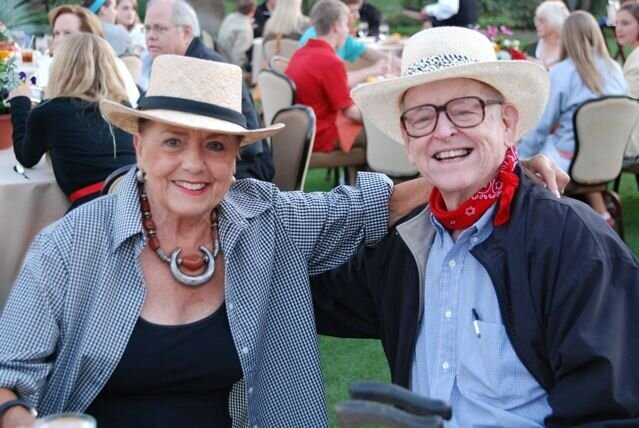
Boeing Jr. and June Boeing in 2014.

Mr. and Mrs. Boeing created the Aldarra Foundation to carry out their philanthropic intentions. The Aldarra Foundation is committed to supporting organizations that strengthen the enduring fabric of the Puget Sound region: advancements in healthcare, human services, education, environmental stewardship, arts culture & humanities, and animal welfare.

The Aldarra Foundation was established as a limited life foundation in 2002 supporting 14 selected charitable organizations until its closing in 2025. Through the Foundation, Mr. and Mrs. Boeing made charitable investments in the work of organizations they believed were instrumental to the Puget Sound Region. The Foundation partnered with 14 charitable organizations to quietly advance transformational outcomes and long-term sustainability. Mr. and Mrs. Boeing worked to inspire additional giving to the organizations with the understanding that it takes the support of the community to sustain a thriving organization.

The Aldarra Foundation celebrated their 14 non-profit partners for their work transforming lives and communities in this 2025 video highlighting their mission in the year the foundation sunset.

The non-profit partner organizations supported by the Aldarra Foundation include: The Museum of Flight Foundation, Seattle Children's Hospital Foundation, Arboretum Foundation, Canine Companions, Cascade PBS, Fred Hutchinson Cancer Center, Hopelink, Mary’s Place, Medic One Foundation, Northwest School for Deaf and Hard of Hearing Children (NWSDHH), Pasado’s Safe Haven, Seattle’s Union Gospel Mission, Treehouse, University of Washington Foundation – School of Medicine.
