= Shoreline College =

Public college in Shoreline, Washington, US

Coordinates: 47°44′54″N 122°21′34″W

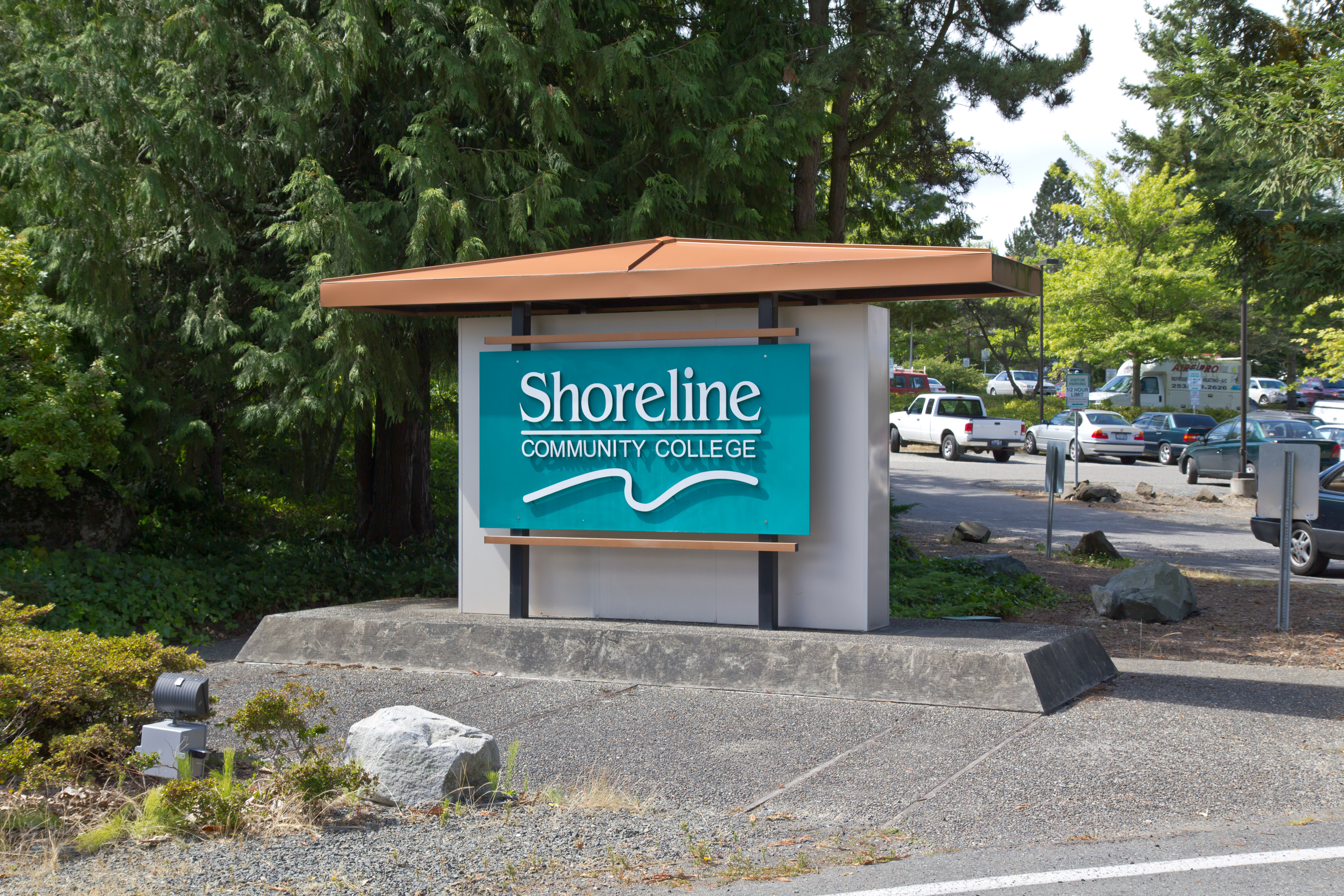
- Former name: Shoreline Community College (1964-2025)
- Type: Public college
- Established: 1964
- President: Jack Kahn
- Faculty: 339 faculty, 231 staff
- Students: 9382 (2025-2026 academic year)
- Location: Shoreline, Washington, United States
- Campus: 83 acres; Suburban
- Nickname: Phins
- Mascot: Dolphin
- Website: www.shoreline.edu

The view of campus from Shoreline College bus stop, capturing the Alder Hall building in front and Pagoda Union Building farther away.

Shoreline College, formerly Shoreline Community College, is a public community college in Shoreline, Washington. It is located in a residential area east of Shoreview Park. The college contains over 80 acres and continuously serves 12,000 full- and part-time students. It opened in 1964 and offers Associate degrees and certificate programs as well as one Bachelor's degree program in dental hygiene. Shoreline College also provides automotive trainings available as a part of National Alternative Fuels Training Consortium, including a 16-week program of Electrical Vehicle Technician (Tesla) Certificate.

== History ==
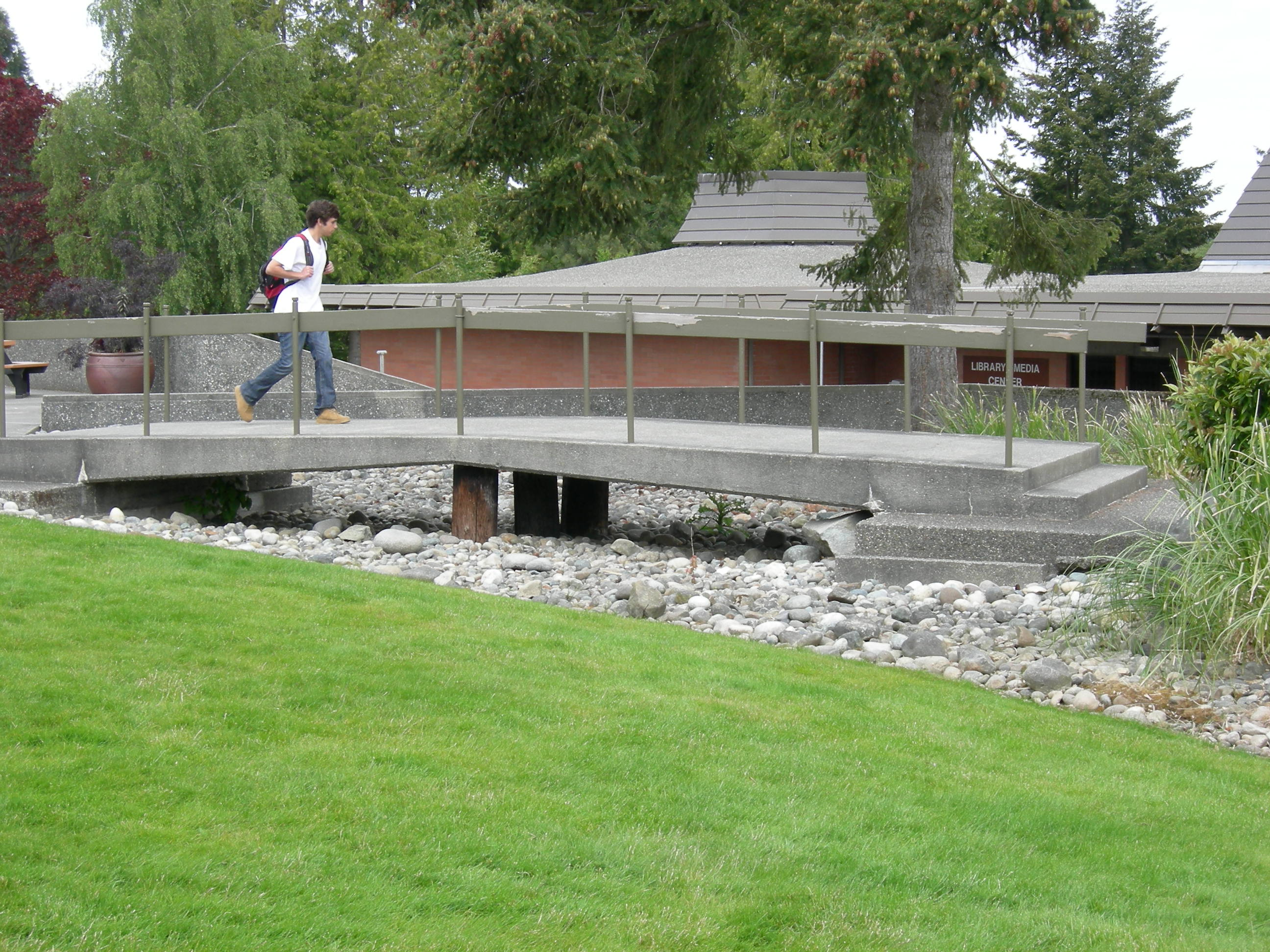
Some elements of Shoreline College's architecture and landscaping are reminiscent of Japanese traditions. Note the high roof element and the rocks representing a stream as in a traditional Japanese garden.

The idea of a community college in Shoreline was suggested by Ray W. Howard, superintendent of the Shoreline School District in 1959.

In the early 1960s, the Boeing family donated 80 acres of land to Shoreline College. Shoreline College started with evening classes in January 1964, accepting 806 student applications that would be taught at Shoreline High School, which is now Shoreline Center. The college campus was ready by fall of 1965.

In 1991, Japanese-American community members criticized Shoreline College's original mascot, the Samurai, as culturally insensitive. In November 1991, students voted to replace the mascot with the Dolphins, beating out the Sea Lions and the Tsunamis.

According to a study released in October 2013 by the Nexus Research and Policy Center and the American Institutes for Research, Shoreline College was recognized among community colleges in Washington state that offer high-quality associate degrees. Graduates were reported to earn $456,269 more in their lifetime than they would have without the degree.

In May 2025, the board of trustees voted to rename the institution from Shoreline Community College to Shoreline College and conducted a survey among students, staff and faculty and, after receiving the majority of votes in favor of rebranding, updated the logo. The new brand was launched in early 2026. Shoreline College is also set to graduate its first cohort of Bachelor's degree students in June 2026, who began the college's Bachelor of Applied Science program in dental hygiene in summer 2024.

== Academics ==
Shoreline College offers several transfer degrees and more than 100 professional, technical, and workforce training degrees and certificates. The institution participates in a Direct Transfer Agreement (DTA) program that allows to transfer undergraduate credits into four-year universities in Washington State.

Over 140 scholarships are awarded annually, as well as over $14.4 million in financial aid. Shoreline College has international students enrolled from 45 countries. After receiving an Associate degree, transfer destinations to complete 2+2 path to bachelor's degree include University of Washington, University of California, University of Minnesota, University of Wisconsin and Arizona State University.

== International education ==
Shoreline College offers admission for international students with F-1 academic and J-1/J-2 exchange visa types and allows their enrollment for degree, certificates, High School Completion or English as a Second Language programs. After their program is completed, international students can transfer to another institution or apply for the Optional Practical Training (OPT) that allows 12-months employment outside of campus in a student's area of study after completing the degree. Shoreline College does not offer the Curricular Practical Training (CPT) program which allows students to participate in the internship as part of their curriculum during the academic year.

In 2025-2026 academic year, Shoreline College accepted roughly 900 international students.

== Campus life ==
Many college departments, such as Associated Student Government and Arts & Entertainment Board, provide multiple events on campus, including sport games, parties, and graduation ceremonies. Shoreline College offers more than 50 cultural, sport, and volunteering clubs, run by current students. Enrolled students can access Fitness Center, Benefit Hub, Career Center, Tutoring Center and other facilities on campus.

Alder Residence Hall (former 7000 Campus Living) hosts up to 200+ students to live on campus starting from the age of 16 and provides the options of shared and private bedrooms or studios. Residents have access to free Wi-Fi, common study space, common kitchen, laundry service, parking and bus stops, as well as community-based and entertainment activities. The student housing building was completed and opened in 2019, situated next to the Pagoda Union Building, parking lot and a bus stop. King County Metro bus routes 5, 333 and 331 serve the Shoreline College bus stop.

Dining options on campus include vending machines, cafeteria in the Pagoda Union Building, and food trucks in the courtyard. The Food Truck Lunch Program is provided by the State Food Truck Association and offers multiple cuisine options for students, staff and faculty four days a week, starting from January 2026.

Current students are eligible for jobs on campus in several departments. Shoreline College offers positions for Student Ambassadors, Office Assistants, Tutors, Peer Mentors, Resident Assistants and other student-hourly options. The work-study program is available as a part of a financial aid package for eligible students.

== Library ==
The library on campus was one of the three first buildings to be constructed when the college was founded in 1964. The library was named in honor of Ray W. Howard, who made a contribution to Shoreline School District, including Shoreline Community College, to celebrate his 50th work anniversary. The facility was remodeled in late 2016 and early 2017.

The Ray Howard Library has a print collection that includes nonfiction, reference, foreign language materials, English as a Second Language (ESL) collection, journals, magazines, and a small popular books section with some graphic novels. While the print collection is supportive of Shoreline College's curriculum, the digital resources include academic and trade journals, magazine and newspaper articles, e-books, reference books, and streaming video. The librarians teach workshops, consultations, and individual sessions to students and others who are learning the research process, and offers student-hourly positions at the front desk, such as Library Student Employee. Ray W. Howard participates in the online chat collaborative service, Ask WA which ensures that students have a way to ask questions 24 hours a day, 7 days a week.

== Publications ==
- The Ebbtide is Shoreline College's student newspaper.
- Spindrift is Shoreline College's Arts and Literary Journal, released annually.
- 1000 Words is a quarterly publication released by f-stop, the Photography club at Shoreline College.

== Notable alumni and faculty ==
=== Alumni ===
- Zoë Baird, lawyer and nominee for United States Attorney General
- Terrell Brown Jr, professional basketball player
- Halvor Hagen, professional football player
- Rod Harrel, actor/writer/director in theatre, video production, and film production
- Bob Hasegawa, member of the Washington State Senate
- Rick Kaminski, printer, real estate agent, and stadium food hawker
- John Lovick, member of the Washington State Senate
- Avery Scharer, professional basketball player
- Joseph J. Tyson, Bishop of Yakima

=== Faculty ===
- Donn Charnley, member of the Washington State Senate
- Patty Murray, member of the U.S. Senate
- Troy Wolff, a professor from the English department and published author, was killed in the attack on Pioneer Square in September 2013, trying to protect his partner. In his honor, Troy Wolff Memorial Scholarship was established to support students majoring in humanities.
