= Latin pop =

Upbeat Latin music mixed with American pop music

- Stylistic origins: Latin music; pop; psychedelic music
- Cultural origins: 1970s, Latin America and Iberian Peninsula
- Derivative forms: Latin ballad; tropipop

Fusion genres
- Chicano rock; Latin rock

Latin pop (Spanish: pop latino), also referred to as Spanish-language pop (Spanish: pop en español) or Portuguese-language pop (Portuguese: pop em português), is a subgenre of popular music defined primarily as pop music performed in Spanish or Portuguese. While its foundation lies in the structural and commercial conventions of international pop music—memorable melodies, rhythmic regularity, electric instrumentation, and broad appeal—it is often enriched by stylistic influences from Latin American and Iberian musical traditions.

Emerging from Spanish-speaking musicians, Latin pop remains distinct from other Latin genres such as rock en español, tropical, reggaeton, and dance, though it may incorporate elements of these styles. In this sense, the fusion with Latin or Hispanic folk genres is characteristic but secondary to its central definition as pop music in Spanish.

== History ==
Latin pop first reached a global audience through the work of bandleader Sergio Mendes in the mid-1960s, although artists like Carmen Miranda popularized Latin samba music in Hollywood decades before this. In later decades, it was defined by the romantic ballads that legendary artists such as Julio Iglesias or Roberto Carlos produced in the 1970s.

Latin pop is one of the most popular Latin music genres today. Popular artists include Los del Río, Jennifer Lopez, Alejandro Sanz, Thalía, Luis Miguel, Selena, Paulina Rubio, Shakira, Carlos Vives, Ricky Martin, Gloria Trevi and Enrique Iglesias. Ricky Martin is considered to be the King of Latin Pop.

=== Influences and development ===
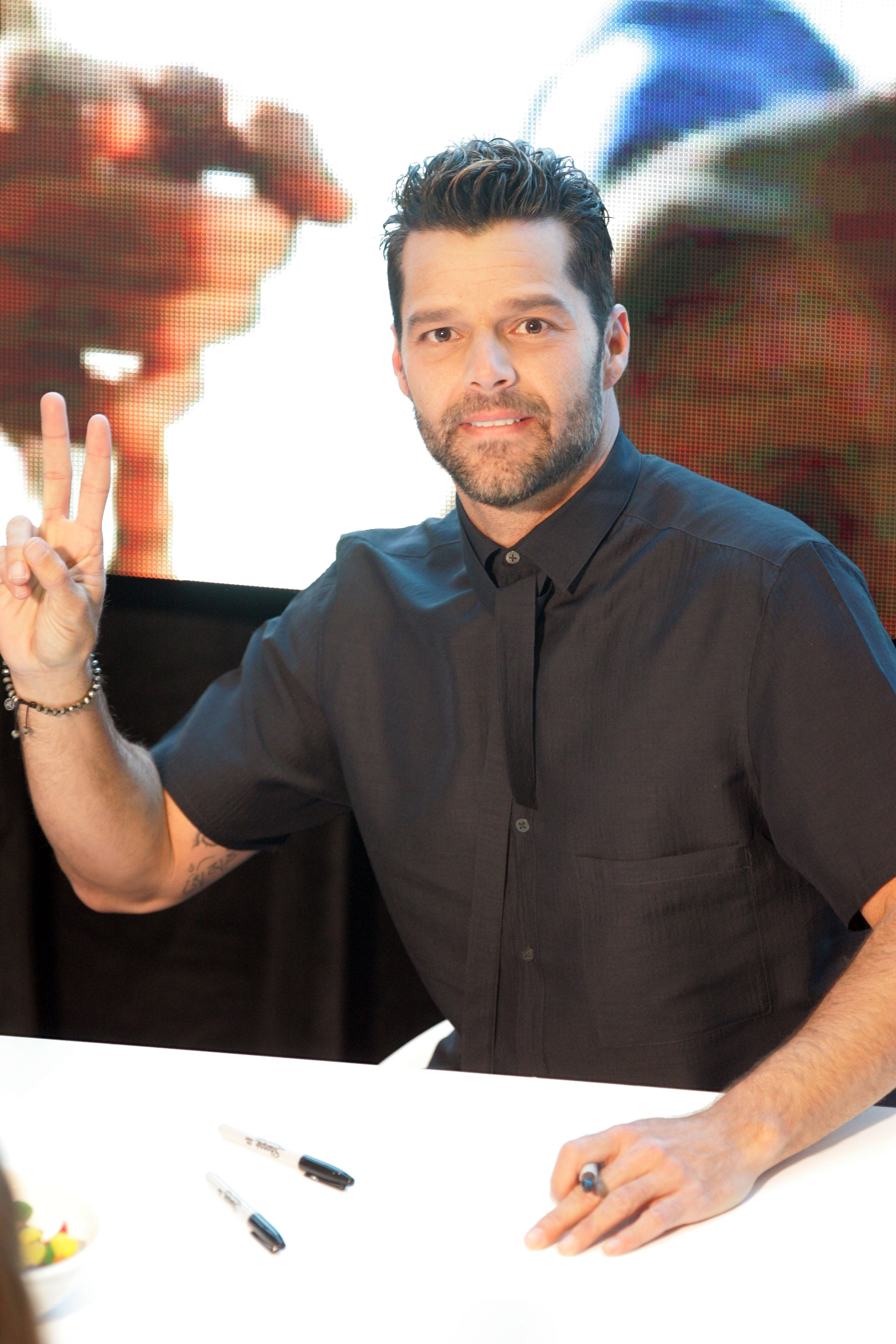
Ricky Martin is an international Puerto Rican singer. He is considered to be the King of Latin Pop.

Latin pop became the most popular form of Latin music in the United States during the 1980s and 1990s, with acts such as Puerto Rican boy band Menudo, even achieving massive crossover success among non-Latino listeners during the late 1990s. While not restricted to America by any means, Latin pop was profoundly affected by production techniques and other styles of music – both Latin and otherwise – that originated primarily in the United States. Tejano music, centered in Texas and the United States/Mexico border region, had begun to introduce synthesizers, slicker production, and a more urban sensibility to formerly root styles like norteño and conjunto.

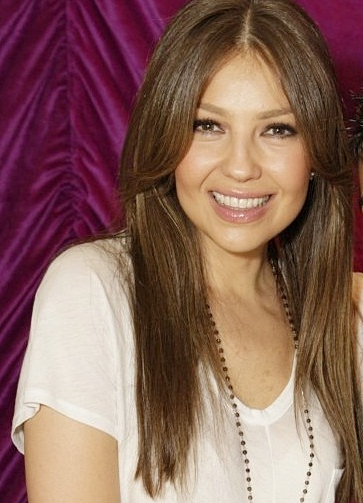
Thalía is a Mexican singer referred to as the "Queen of Latin Pop".

Moreover, New York and Miami were home to thriving Latin club scenes, which during the 1980s led to the rise of Latin freestyle, a club-oriented dance music that was rooted in Latin rhythms but relied on synthesizers and drum machines for most of its arrangements. Both of these sounds influenced the rise of Latin pop, which retained Latin rhythms in its uptempo numbers but relied more on mainstream pop for its melodic sense.

Latin pop's first major crossover star was Gloria Estefan, who scored a succession of non-club-oriented dance-pop hits during the mid- to late 1980s, but eventually became known more as an adult contemporary diva with an affinity for sweeping ballads. This blend of Latinized dance-pop and adult contemporary balladeering dominated Latin pop through the 1990s. Most of its artists sang in Spanish for Latino audiences, although Latin pop's similarity to the mainstream helped several performers score crossover hits when they chose to record in English. Jon Secada landed several pop hits during the mid-1990s, and Tejano pop star Selena's album Dreaming of You actually debuted posthumously at number one on the album charts upon its 1995 release.

The late '90s and early 2000s saw Latin artists such as Ricky Martin, Enrique Iglesias, Shakira, Jennifer Lopez and ex-husband Marc Anthony, Paulina Rubio, Jade Esteban Estrada, Thalía, among others, achieve crossover mainstream success. Other traditionally pop artists also made forays into Latin pop either finding success experimenting with the sound, such as Debelah Morgan and 98 Degrees, or recording Spanish versions of their songs or albums, such as Christina Aguilera and Jessica Simpson, to name a few.

== See also ==
- Billboard Latin Music Awards
- Billboard Latin pop charts
- Freestyle music
- Grammy Award for Best Latin Pop Album
- Latin American music in the United States
- Latin ballad
- Latin Grammy Award for Best Contemporary Pop Vocal Album
- Latin music
- Latin trap
- Lo Nuestro Award for Pop Song of the Year
- Mexican pop music
- Music of Brazil
- Music of Colombia
- Music of Latin America
- Music of Spain
- Nueva ola
- Pop music
- Regional Mexican
- Tropical music
