= Stark Raving Theatre =

Theatre in Portland, Oregon (1988–2006)

Stark Raving Theatre was a theatre company in Portland, Oregon that operated from 1988 to 2006. It was dedicated to premiering new works.

== Starting up ==
The company was founded by playwrights Rod Harrel, Robin Suttles, and E.J. Westlake, who had met working for The New Rose Theatre. Concerned about the lack of venues for new works, the three writers decided to create a space where artists could experiment with existing material and to workshop new plays. Initially, Harrel was the artistic director, Suttles was the Technical Director, and Westlake was the managing director. The Board of Directors included artists such as Cathy J. Lewis, Joel Applegate, and David Williams. The name "Stark Raving" derived from the theatre's original plan to occupy a space on Stark Street; however, the first few seasons took place in the basement of the Bullring Restaurant (seating less than 50 people) on Northwest 27th Street. With an average ceiling height of only 6 feet 6 inches, the space certainly presented challenges for both designers and actors.

== Season One, 1989 ==
The theatre officially opened on March 11, 1989, with a benefit screening of Harrel's video work Jack, a retelling of the Jack the Ripper story. "Like some Jacobean drama ('Jack') seems to exist mostly for the thrill of the dirty deeds."

The first staged production in SRT's history was Westlake's semi-musical The Foofy, Open-Toed Shoe: a Not Necessarily Politically Correct, Lesbian, Feminist, Mystery Farce, featuring Allison Coe, Mackenzie Wren, Patty French, and Holly Bennett. The play opened on March 30 and Bob Hicks of The Oregonian remarked, "Westlake has fun blending the silly conventions of gumshoe drama with the dirt-between-the-toes political correctness of the radical gay community. Things may end abruptly, but it's a lightly amusing little trip."

The second production in the spring/summer of 1989 was Harrel's courtroom farce, Trial By Error. This was SRT's first bonifide hit with standing room only crowds and a week's extension on the original run. The Willamette Week's Bob Sitton wrote, "Proof that theatre can still be fun in an age of professionalization is found in Trial By Error, Rod Harrel's what-the-hell spoof...and it's refreshing to see new faces on stage along with some more familiar actors...".

== Season Two, 1989-1990 ==
Stark Raving opened its second season, with a full slate of productions, in October, 1989 with Harrel's production of Elmer Rice's The Adding Machine. Harrel was proud to receive the review headline: "Adding Machine rings up zero". Although hard on the show, the reviewer recognized SRT's attempt at doing something different. "(Elmer) Rice's tale seems to be a grand exercise in black social comedy, but little humor sneaks into director Rod Harrel's production...To be done justice, the play needs the talents of a more professional company. But the odds of a Storefront (Theatre), Portland Rep or Oregon Shakespeare Festival taking a chance on such financially risky material are - well, close to Zero...Which leaves it to little Stark Raving Theatre which at least took an honest stab." Westlake's parody of absurdism From Here to Absurdity, and Suttle's innovative take on Titus Andronicus followed. The group was committed to a pay-what-you-can sliding scale, and asked for $0–$15 at the door, and $0–$500+ from subscribers/contributors. Stage readings began in September, 1989 and new plays were being submitted. This approach was noted in an article in the [Portland Area Theatre Alliance's] newsletter, TheatreSource. "Plays that deal with unusual subject matter, offbeat approaches or unique psychological insights are welcome, and staged readings of those kinds of new works will be performed during the season."

The three founders split up in early 1990 because of artistic differences, mostly revolving around how political the work of the theatre should be. Suttles went on to take a key role in Tygres Heart Shakespeare Company; Westlake remained as the managing director and recruited Rich Burroughs as the artistic director; Harrel remained active with SRT as an actor while continuing his work in video.

The remainder of the season featured Paul Bernstein's Cold Hands, a play seen through the eyes of a homeless man with schizophrenia featuring Rod Harrel and Michelle Maida, and Burning Conscience, a stage adaptation of the letters of Claude Eatherly, the pilot of the Straight Flush, directed by Norm Johnson.

== Season Three, 1990-1991 ==
The season was advertised as an "adventure" to support a "remarkable risk-taking group," and used a quote from the Marquis de Sade: "We believe that every situation is at the disposition of the novelist...only fools will be scandalized. True virtue was never frightened...by pictures of vice..." The season opened with two of Bertolt Brecht's Lehrstücke: The Measures Taken and The Exception and the Rule. Both were directed by Rich Burroughs with interested students from Reed College, currently studying Brecht and Epic Theatre. Melissa Marsland directed The Wallsby Argentine absurdist Griselda Gambaro, and Burroughs directed a New Historicist experiment called The Jew of Venice, a study of English Renaissance portrayals of Jewish characters.

Politicized by her travels to Nicaragua during the Revolutionary regime, Westlake staged a tribute to the Nicaraguan people, Mothers of Heroes, featuring Harrel as White Guilt, Allison Coe as the confused autobiographical character Sam, and Brenna Sage as Hannah, Sam's partner, and multiple other characters.. Burroughs recruited Dave Demke to direct The Butcher Papers by Dan Duling, the beginning of SRT's long relationship with Demke and Myra Donnelley. The season closed with Burroughs' staging of Georg Büchner's Woyzeck. This marked the first time that The Oregonian featured the theatre in a 'preview' article.

As a pay-what-you-can theatre, SRT rarely made enough money to pay its expenses. Artists were paid under a share system where a certain percentage of the box office was divided equally among the artists; they rarely made more than $20 a show, and never more than $80. The Bullring also relied on a percentage of the box office as rent and the restaurant management was frequently disappointed with the trickle of cash that came in. The Fire Marshall noted that serious upgrades were needed to keep the theatre open, and the Bullring moved to evict the theatre. Westlake convinced the restaurant owners to keep the theatre for one more season and to pitch in for the cost of the fire code upgrades.

== Season Four, 1991-1992 ==
This was Stark Raving's Brave New Works season, including Aubrey Hampton's one-man play Mixed Blood, based on Cantwell's book about the AIDS conspiracy, starring Steven Clark Pachosa. With Hampton and Donnelly's help, Burroughs took the play to off-off-Broadway. Burroughs stepped down as artistic director, leaving Westlake to manage the remainder of the season before passing the company along to Demke and Donnelley. The rest of the season featured the 100th Monkey Collective's staging of The Conduct of Life by María Irene Fornés, Donnelley's play Angelmaker about the controversial figure Ruth Barnett, and Llew Rhoe's staging of Westlake's A.E.: The Disappearance and Death of Amelia Earhart, featuring Rod Harrel and Tammie Andreas, which later went on to win the Oregon Book Award. that year. SRT was also home to the premier of Steve Patterson's play Bombardment that summer. The final performance of the season was Westlake's staging of Split Britches' Little Women: the Tragedy. Originally written for the trio of Lois Weaver, Peggy Shaw, and Deb Margolin, Little Women pushed the limits of SRT's space and challenged its regular audience. This was the last time Westlake and Harrel worked together at SRT (he designed the sound). By the end of the run, it played to packed houses who were disappointed at Donnelley's announcement that the theatre would be closing if it could not find a new space for the next season.

By this time, SRT garnered a reputation for edgy and provocative new work. Cate Garrison of Willamette Week noted: "Stark Raving Theatre is not afraid to explore the painful choices society frequently has to make" and "A highly individual performance space that offers the kin of inventive, inexpensive theatre that will...make you think a little." Rebecca Morris of The Oregonian declared: "Stark Raving Theatre...chooses plays other theatres rarely touch." Bob Hicks had dubbed SRT as "Brash, little Stark Raving Theatre."

Westlake left SRT for graduate school and Donnelley and Demke moved the company to a new venue (Back Door Stage) on Hawthorne Blvd. in Southeast Portland.

== Later seasons ==
From the fifth season (1992-1993) until the 12th season (1999-2000), Donnelley and Demke ran the theatre from the Back Door Stage (on Hawthorne Blvd.) and then to the TheatreTheatre! space on Belmont St. and also the old New Rose Theatre space at 904 SE Main in downtown Portland. They also achieved a level of funding SRT had not been accustomed to earlier and were able to expand the theatre's original vision of producing new works.

The theatre passed again to others' hands after Donnelley and Demke left. After moving back to Northwest Portland Stark Raving Theatre abruptly closed in 2006.

== Selected awards ==
Oregon Book Award, 1992, The Disappearance and Death of Amelia Earhart by E.J. Westlake; Drammy Award, 2001, Actress: Darcy Lynn, "Money Shot'; Drammy Award, 2003, Acting Ensemble, "ElectroPuss"

== See also ==
- Culture of Portland, Oregon
