= E. J. Westlake =

American playwright and scholar

E.J. Westlake
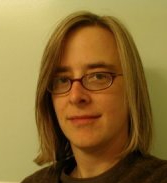
- Professor, Ohio State University
- Born: July 5, 1965 (age 61); Dayton, Ohio
- Occupation: Academic
- Writing career
- Genres: Literary criticism, postmodernism
- Website: theatreandfilm.osu.edu/people/westlake.35/

E.J. Westlake (born 1965) is a playwright and performance studies scholar. She won an Oregon Book Award in 1991.

== Biography ==
=== Early life ===
E.J. Westlake was born Jane Elizabeth Westlake in Dayton, Ohio, the daughter of Curtis Edison Westlake, a factory worker at Delco Products, and Joy Louise Hauser, a political activist and printer. After graduating from Colonel White Performing Arts School in Dayton, Ohio in 1982, Westlake attended the University of Minnesota in Minneapolis where she majored in Theatre Arts and Business (Bachelor of Individualized Studies, 1985).

=== Career ===
Westlake moved to Portland, Oregon and began working at the New Rose Theatre first as the Box Office Manager, then as the Marketing Director. There she met Rod Harrel. She, Harrel, and Robin Suttles founded Stark Raving Theatre in 1988 and began developing and staging new plays. Several of Westlake's own plays were staged there, including The Foofy, Open-Toed Shoe: a Not Necessarily Politically Correct, Lesbian, Feminist, Mystery Farce, From Here to Absurdity, Mothers of Heroes, about Westlake's experience with the Benjamin Linder Construction Brigade in Nicaragua, and A.E.: the Disappearance and Death of Amelia Earhart. Westlake also directed several of the plays at the theatre, including Cold Hands, and Split Britches' Little Women: the Tragedy.

For A.E., Westlake received the Oregon Book Award from the Oregon Institute for Literary Arts for 1992.

Westlake left Stark Raving to begin graduate studies at the University of Wisconsin–Madison in 1992 and completed her PhD in Theatre and Drama in 1997.

Westlake is the author of Our Land is Made of Courage and Glory: Nationalist Performance in Nicaragua and Guatemala and is co-editor of Political Performances: Theory and Practice. She is also the author of the popular textbook "World Theatre: The Basics.

She was a Professor of Theatre and Drama at the University of Michigan School of Music, Theatre & Dance. She also held an appointment as Professor of English Language and Literature. In 2021, Westlake left Michigan and became the Chair of the Department of Theatre, Film, and Media Arts at The Ohio State University.

In 2010, Westlake took over as the Book Review Editor of Theatre Annual: A Journal of Performance Studies. She was the Book Review Editor until 2015.

In 2017, Westlake was appointed co-editor of Theatre Journal and became the editor in 2019.
