= Jade Esteban Estrada =

American singer, actor, stand-up comedian, and journalist

Background information
- Born: September 17, 1975 (age 50)
- Origin: San Antonio, Texas, U.S.
- Genres: Latin Pop
- Occupations: Singer, songwriter, producer, comedian, actor, director, choreographer, columnist, dancer, striptease artist
- Instrument: Vocals
- Years active: 1998–present
- Label: Vicarious Records
- Website: getjaded.com

Jade Esteban Estrada (born September 17, 1975) is an American singer, actor, stand-up comedian, journalist and human rights activist.

== Biography ==
Born to David Gonzales Estrada and Aurora (née Sanchez) Estrada, Jade Esteban Estrada has four siblings. As a young boy, Estrada participated in extracurricular school activities and sang in the school choir. Growing up in the Catholic Church, Estrada once believed that he would join the clergy. Through his local parish, he became a member of the Boy Scouts of America. Through the encouragement of his choir instructor, he began to take voice lessons and eventually moved to New York to attend the American Musical and Dramatic Academy.

Estrada appeared in the German production of Starlight Express and worked as a dancer for Seventeen. After two popular appearances as a transgender singer/dancer on The Jerry Springer Show, he worked as Charo's choreographer and lead dancer. He gained international recognition in 1998 when he released the single "Reggae Twist" on the Brooklyn-based Total Envision Records label.

In 2008, he hosted the 19th Annual South Florida GLAAD Media Awards on Bravo. During the Obama Administration, he was invited to The White House to attend the State Arrival Ceremony welcoming President of Mexico Felipe Calderón and his wife Margarita Zavala.

== Latin pop music ==
According to Latina, Estrada is "probably best known as a Latin pop singer."

In 2001, Estrada made an announcement that would benefit his career. "I am proud to be a gay Latino," he said, while performing at Central New York Pride in Utica, New York.

In April 2002, Estrada lent his name to Being Out Rocks, a two-part National Coming Out Day project organized by the Human Rights Campaign. A poster celebrating "openly gay, lesbian, bisexual and transgendered musicians" was nationally distributed and encouraged young people to be themselves and to not let gender identity be an obstacle to their success. Other artists who signed their name included Melissa Etheridge, Pet Shop Boys, RuPaul, Michael Stipe and Indigo Girls.

On National Coming Out Day, October 11, 2002, a benefit CD featuring the songs of openly LGBT musicians and straight allies was released by Centaur Entertainment. Estrada, Cyndi Lauper, Queen, k.d. lang and Sarah McLachlan were among the artists who donated songs to the album.

== Stand-up comedy ==
Though Estrada has worked as a stand-up comedian in North America, Australia, South Africa and the United Kingdom, he's mostly known as for his headlining shows throughout the American Southwest. "Estrada's delivery is endearingly folksy," writes Linda Ray of the Tucson Weekly. "It's as if he's metaphorically winking at an audience of friends as he deflates the stereotypes he invites with his flamboyant look, insider-Mexican bon mots and gay-culture references." USA Today's 10 Best wrote, "Laugh Out Loud Comedy Club should be on the top of your bucket list, especially when headlined by Jade Esteban Estrada from Bravo TV and Comedy Central."

Estrada frequently headlines the Sapphire Comedy Hour at Sapphire Las Vegas.

== Theatre ==
In 1993, Estrada played the title role in the national touring production of Tom Thumb in Toyland. In 1997, he returned to San Antonio's Jump-Start Theatre to perform in Milagritos by Sandra Cisneros and in Alicia Mena's There Comes a Time. Of the latter production, Dan R. Goddard of the San Antonio Express-News wrote, "But Estrada gives the best comic performance as poor, put-upon Peter, who allows himself to be overwhelmed by Ceci's fantasies - though it starts to wear thin after his 50th attempt to sing like Pedro Infante even though he's tone deaf."

In 2000, Estrada choreographed and starred in the New York production of Tropical! at Teatro LaTea. Robert Kent of TheatreMania wrote, "The show's greatest strength is the enthusiasm of these entertainers, who beautifully perform Estrada's demanding routines with dazzling smiles not seen in a musical variety show since Donny & Marie."

In 2016, Estrada was an artist-in-residence at Prohibition Theatre in Houston, Texas. During this time, he wrote, directed and starred in burlesque adaptations of Edgar Allan Poe's The Masque of the Red Death, Eat Me, an adult-themed reboot of Lewis Carroll's Alice's Adventures in Wonderland and Tales of a Hard Nut, a comedic adaptation of The Nutcracker. In 2017, he returned to San Antonio to begin a two-year artist residency at the Overtime Theatre where he wrote, directed and choreographed Sinderella and the Glass Zipper, a burlesque adaptation of Cinderella.

Of Estrada's second holiday play, How Burlesque Saved Christmas, Bryan Rindfuss of the San Antonio Current wrote, "From the wild mind behind such unusual offerings as ICONS: The Lesbian and Gay History of the World, Vol. 1, Sinderella and the Glass Zipper, and Tales of a Hard Nut comes How Burlesque Saved Christmas — an original production written, directed and choreographed by multitalented performer Jade Esteban Estrada. Bursting with all the makings of a naughty adaptation of How the Grinch Stole Christmas!, the seasonal affair builds on Estrada's ever-creative comedic chops as well as his background in the scantily clad world of burlesque."

In 2018, Estrada wrote, directed and starred in Madame X: A Burlesque Fantasy, a story based on the life of portraitist John Singer Sargent and his famous painting, Portrait of Madame X.

=== Solo work from 2000 to 2009 ===
During the height of his Latin pop music success, Estrada wrote a solo musical comedy entitled ICONS: The Lesbian and Gay History of the World, Vol. 1, which he performed at the 2002 Columbus Gay and Lesbian Theatre Festival in Columbus, Ohio. In the show, he portrayed Sappho, Michelangelo, Oscar Wilde, Gertrude Stein, Sylvia Rivera and Ellen DeGeneres. The presentation found a core audience among college students and played such institutions as Princeton University, Cornell University and other academic stages.

Two years later, he premiered its sequel, ICONS: The Lesbian and Gay History of the World, Vol. 2, at the 2004 Columbus Gay and Lesbian Theatre Festival. In this installment, he took on the roles of Alexander the Great, Christina, Queen of Sweden, Susan B. Anthony, Billie Jean King, Harvey Milk and Mark Bingham. The show garnered the award for Audience Favorite in Solo Performance. Niki D'Andrea of the Phoenix New Times observed, "While Estrada's long been an admired figure in gay culture, his ICONS show has earned kudos from all sorts of groups."

Estrada debuted ICONS: The Lesbian and Gay History of the World, Vol. 3 at the 2006 Columbus Gay and Lesbian Theatre Festival. In this show, he portrayed Naomi (biblical figure), King James VI and I, Bessie Smith, Greg Louganis and Mary Cheney and won festival awards for Best Solo Performance and Best Original Music.

In 2007, Estrada received a commission to create a solo show about Russian playwright Anton Chekhov for the Twin Cities Chekhov Festival in Minneapolis, Minnesota. Chek it, Baby: A Fabulous Explanation of Anton Chekhov's Fiercest Plays earned favorable reviews when it premiered at Bryant-Lake Bowl the following year. In Lavender Magazine's 2008 Theatre Year in Review, John Townsend gave the show an Outstanding Touring Performance nod and wrote, "Jade Esteban Estrada actually put a queer spin on Anton Chekhov, the one playwright you may have thought was totally queer-resistant. If you ever had any doubt of Chekhov's greatness, Estrada erases that." Tad Simons of Minneapolis-St. Paul Magazine called it "genuinely funny."

=== Solo work from 2010–present ===
In 2010, Estrada premiered his one-person show, ICONS: The Lesbian and Gay History of the World, Vol. 4, in Tallahassee, Florida.

When Estrada embarked on a five-city tour of Mike Daisey's The Agony and the Ecstasy of Steve Jobs in 2013, critics praised the unexpected collaboration. "Estrada is a comedian, singer, and gay entertainment icon. Daisey's monologue — written for himself — tells the story of a technology early adopter whose faith in Apple and its charismatic founder is challenged when he discovers the wretched conditions Chinese workers endure to make our cherished i-devices. What does playing for laughs have to do with social justice issues? A lot, it seems. Estrada's comedic timing puts the spotlight on the fan boy's increasing double vision as he attempts to hold on to his devotion to the world of Mac," observed Scott Andrews of the San Antonio Current. "Jade Esteban Estrada knows how to draw an audience in and hold them in the palm of his hand," wrote Deborah Martin of the San Antonio Express-News. "He puts that skill to fine use in The Agony and the Ecstasy of Steve Jobs, a solo show written by Mike Daisey exploring the cult of tech giant Apple.

In 2016, Estrada played a three-week run of ICONS: The Lesbian and Gay History of the World, Vol. 1 at the Fringe World Festival in Perth, Australia. Mae Anthony of Dircksey Magazine described the continental premiere as "a poignant, informative show [full of] humour, witty lyricism, and outrageous cheek. Jade was in character, right up until next the icon's wig was put on. These funny, and often, deeply moving characterisations were expressed through costumes, accents, songs, expressive monologues - and not to mention the outright demolition of the fourth wall - and gave me a fresh insight into the various struggles faced by the gay community throughout history." In 2017, Estrada performed the show in Cape Town, South Africa and was featured on the cover of Out Africa Magazine's Summer 2017 issue. Editor Keith Coventry wrote, "From the acceptance of same-sex relationships in the ancient world to the religious demonisation in later centuries. From the wit of Wilde to the tragedy of the holocaust, ICONS is an enlightening, educational and, above all, entertaining experience as he turns the pages of history."

In 2018, Estrada starred in the San Antonio production of Bernard J. Taylor's The Kindness of Strangers, a one-person show about the life of Tennessee Williams. Playwright Mark Leonard lauded Estrada's "brilliant, energetic portrayal of Williams. Both Taylor and Estrada deftly sidestep the cloying cliches to offer a gripping and vastly entertaining hour or so in the company of an American genius bent on self-destruction. Their Tennessee has heart, soul, rage, and wit and it is well worth spending an evening entranced and entertained in his company."

Later that year, Estrada wrote and starred in two new solo shows: Magick: An Evening with Aleister Crowley and A Sign from the Taco Gods Both productions premiered at the Overtime Theater in San Antonio.

== Journalism ==
In 2011, Estrada began interviewing elected officials for his Glitter Political column which was originally published by the online news site, Plaza de Armas. In 2013, after Plaza de Armas ceased publication due to financial difficulties, his column was picked up by the San Antonio Current. In 2019, Bexar County Commissioner Tommy Calvert wrote, "Jade Esteban Estrada is one of the best political writers in Texas.".

== Lectures and symposiums ==
In 2001, Estrada delivered the keynote address at the OutFront Minnesota State Conference in Brainerd, Minnesota. In 2005, he presented From Latin Pop Performer to Gay Icon at Princeton University. In 2010, he presented Assimilation and the 21st Century Latino at Colorado State University. The following year, he presented The Politics of Being Gay and Latino in America at Blue Mountain Community College in Pendleton, Oregon.

In 2012, he was a panelist for How the Media Shapes, Influences or Explains Latino Identity at the 9th Annual Center for Mexican American Studies and Research Conference at Our Lady of the Lake University in San Antonio.

In 2015, the San Antonio Public Library invited Estrada to take part in a panel entitled Come OUT, which Don Mathis of the Rivard Report described as "a discussion with local LGBTQ artists who have contributed to the diversity of the arts and humanities."

Estrada presented his lecture, The Art of Storytelling, at the Metropolitan Community Church General Conference XXVI in Victoria, British Columbia, Canada in 2016.

== Personal life ==
In 2015, Estrada wrote about being estranged from his father since coming out.

=== Politics and activism ===
Although Estrada has politically identified as nonpartisan since 2014, he has a history of supporting the U.S. Democratic Party, especially its LGBT programs and initiatives. In 2003, he supported Howard Dean's campaign for U.S. president and supported Barack Obama during the 2008 and 2012 presidential elections.

In 2013, Estrada was a guest speaker for the international grassroots movement March Against Monsanto.

== Awards and recognition ==
In 2002, author Ed Karvoski Jr. featured Estrada on the cover of the book Award-Winning Men: Up Close and Personal with Gay Honorees. Later that year, Estrada was grand marshal of the Tulsa and San Antonio LGBT Pride parades.

In 2006, Kentucky governor Ernie Fletcher paid tribute to Estrada by commissioning him the title of Kentucky Colonel, the highest honor awarded by the Commonwealth of Kentucky, which acknowledges outstanding ambassadors of goodwill and fellowship around the world. Estrada joined other honorary colonels such as Winston Churchill, Ronald Reagan, Bob Hope, Joan Crawford, Mae West, Johnny Depp, Muhammad Ali and Pope John Paul II.

== Discography ==
- Fabulous Gay Tunes, Vol. 2 (2003)
- Being Out Rocks (2002)
- Angel (2001)
- Reggae Twist (1998)

== Sources ==
- Famous LGBT people, life.arizona.edu, October 1, 2010.
- Milk Resource Kit, glaad.org, September 3, 2008.
- A Celebration of America's Undiscovered Talent, holyheadshot.com. Retrieved May 11, 2016.
- James N. Loehlin Chekhov: The Cherry Orchard, Plays in Production, p. 237 by James N. Loehlin. Cambridge University Press, January 5, 2006
- John Willis and Ben Hodges, Theatre World: The Most Complete Record of the American Theatre 2004-2005 Vol. 61 p. 238, Applause Theatre and Cinema Books, May 1, 2005
- James Thomas Sears, Youth, education and sexualities: an international encyclopedia p. 584, Greenwood Publishing Group, January 1, 2005
