= William E. Boeing =

American aviation pioneer (1881–1956)

William E. Böing
- William Edward Böing
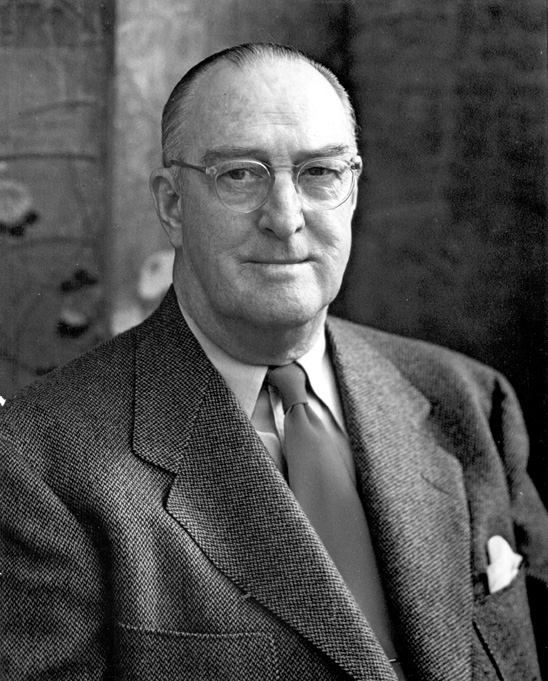
- Pronunciation: bhøːɪŋ
- Born: William Edward Böing; October 1, 1881; Detroit, Michigan, U.S.
- Died: September 28, 1956 (aged 74); Puget Sound, Washington, U.S.
- Education: Yale University
- Occupation: Industrialist
- Known for: Founder of Boeing
- Spouse: Bertha M. Potter Paschall Böing (m. 1921)
- Children: William E. Boeing Jr. (German: William E. Böing Jr
- Awards: Daniel Guggenheim Medal (1934)

William Edward Böing (anglicized as Boeing) (/ˈboʊɪŋ/; October 1, 1881 – September 28, 1956) was an American aviation pioneer. He founded the Pacific Airplane Company in 1916, which was renamed to Boeing a year later. The company is now the largest exporter in the United States by dollar value and among the largest aerospace manufacturers in the world.

Boeing's first design was the Boeing Model 1 (or B & W Seaplane), which first flew in June 1916, a month before the company was founded. He also helped create the United Aircraft and Transport Corporation in 1929 and served as its chairman until its forced breakup in 1934. He received the Daniel Guggenheim Medal in 1934 and was posthumously inducted in to the National Aviation Hall of Fame in 1966, ten years after his death.

== Early life ==
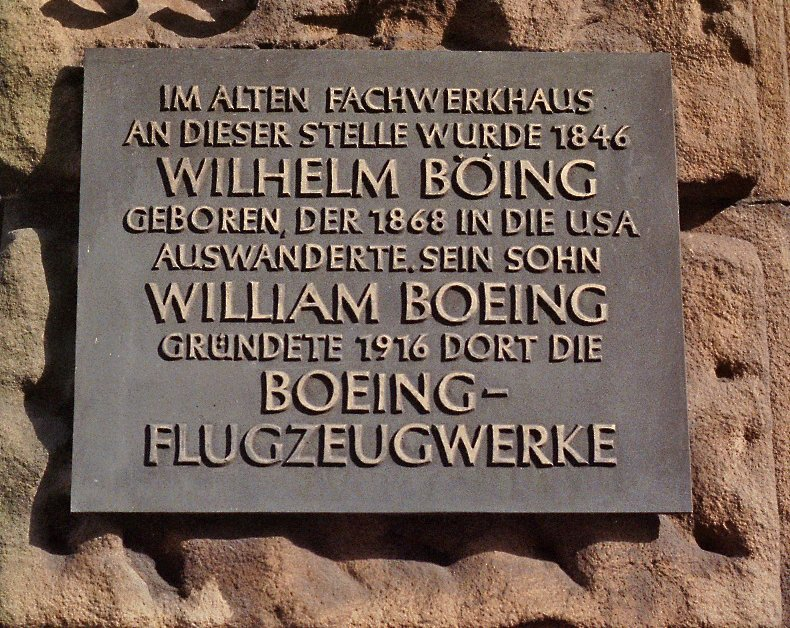
Metal plaque, Lenneuferstraße 33, Hagen-Hohenlimburg

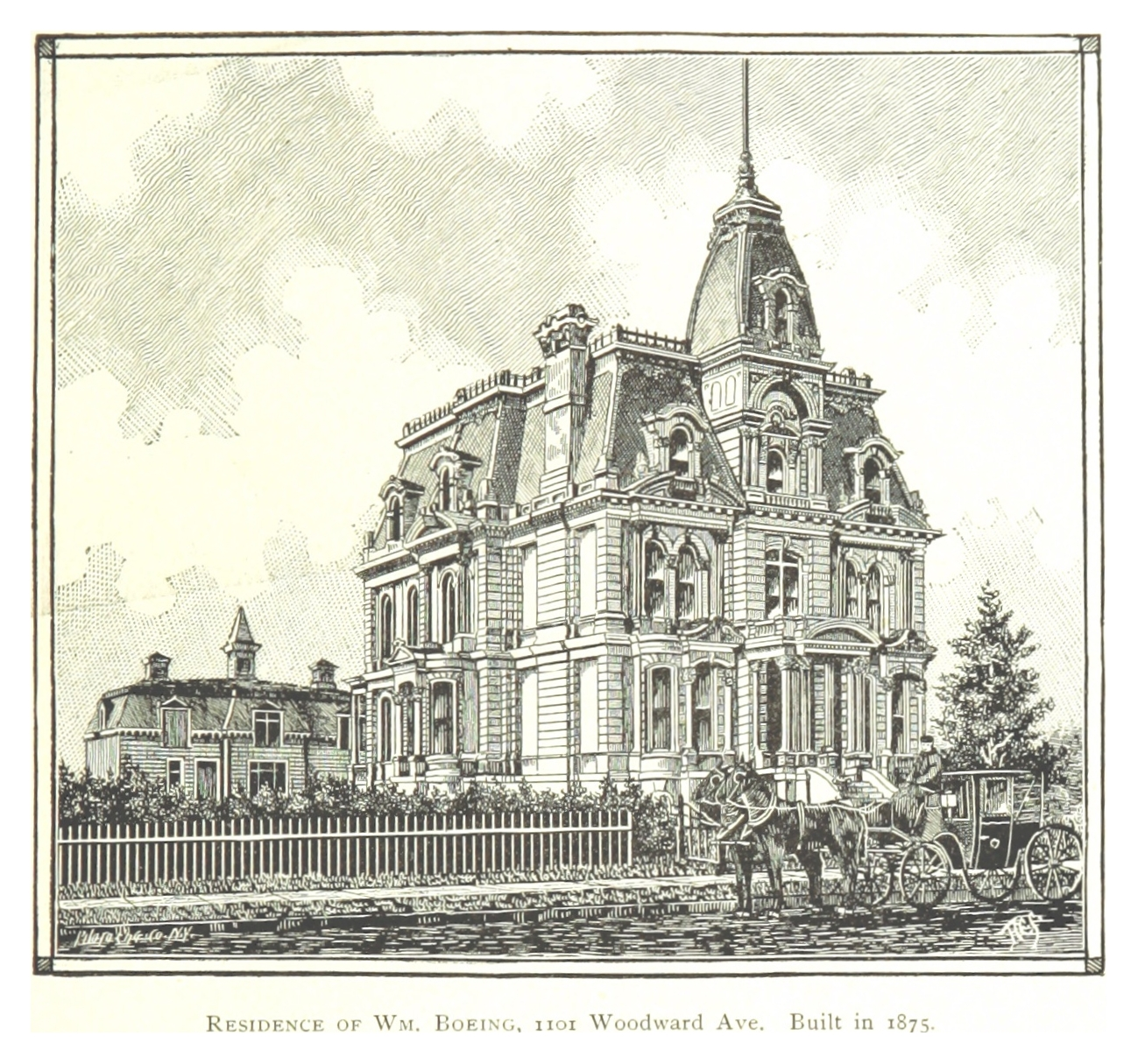
William Boeing's birthplace, on Woodward Avenue, Detroit, was designed by Henry T Brush.

William Boeing was born in Detroit, Michigan, to Marie M. Ortmann, from Vienna, Austria, and Wilhelm Böing (1846–1890), a wealthy mining engineer, from Hohenlimburg, Germany. Wilhelm Böing had emigrated to the United States in 1868 and initially worked as a laborer. His move to the United States was disliked by his father and he received no financial support. He later made a fortune from North Woods timber lands and iron ore mineral rights on the Mesabi Range of Minnesota, north of Lake Superior.

In 1890, when William was eight, his father died of influenza and his mother soon moved to Europe. Marie enrolled William Jr. and his sister at schools in Switzerland. William attended school in Vevey, Switzerland, and returned to the US for a year of prep school at St. Paul's School in Concord, New Hampshire. William Boeing's mother remarried in 1898 and moved to Virginia. He enrolled at Yale University in New Haven, Connecticut, in 1898, studying in the engineering department of the Sheffield Scientific School, but dropped out in 1903 to go into the lumber business.

== Career ==
In 1903, at age 22, Boeing moved to Hoquiam, Washington, in the Pacific Northwest. He purchased extensive timberland around Grays Harbor on the Olympic Peninsula and bought into lumber operations. He prospered in the business during a nationwide construction boom. He was successful in the venture, in part by shipping lumber to the East Coast via the then-new Panama Canal, generating funds that he would later apply to a very different business.

While being president of Greenwood Timber Company, Boeing, who had experimented with boat design, traveled to Seattle. During the Alaska-Yukon-Pacific Exposition in 1909, he saw a piloted flying machine for the first time and became fascinated with aircraft. In 1910, at the Dominguez Flying Meet, Boeing asked every pilot foreign and domestic if he could go for an airplane ride and was repeatedly denied except for French aviator Louis Paulhan. Boeing waited and Paulhan finished the meet and left, never giving Boeing his ride.

Boeing took flying lessons at Glenn L. Martin Flying School in Los Angeles and purchased one of Martin's planes. Martin pilot James Floyd Smith traveled to Seattle to assemble Boeing's new Martin TA hydroaeroplane and continue to teach its owner to fly. Huge crates arrived by train and Smith assembled the plane in a tent hangar erected on the shore of Lake Union. Boeing's test pilot, Herb Munter, soon damaged the plane.

When he was told by Martin that replacement parts would not be available for months, Boeing told his friend, Commander George Conrad Westervelt of the US Navy, "We could build a better plane ourselves and build it faster." Westervelt agreed. They soon built and flew the B & W Seaplane, an amphibian biplane that had outstanding performance. Boeing decided to go into the aircraft business, using an old boat works on the Duwamish River near Seattle for his factory.

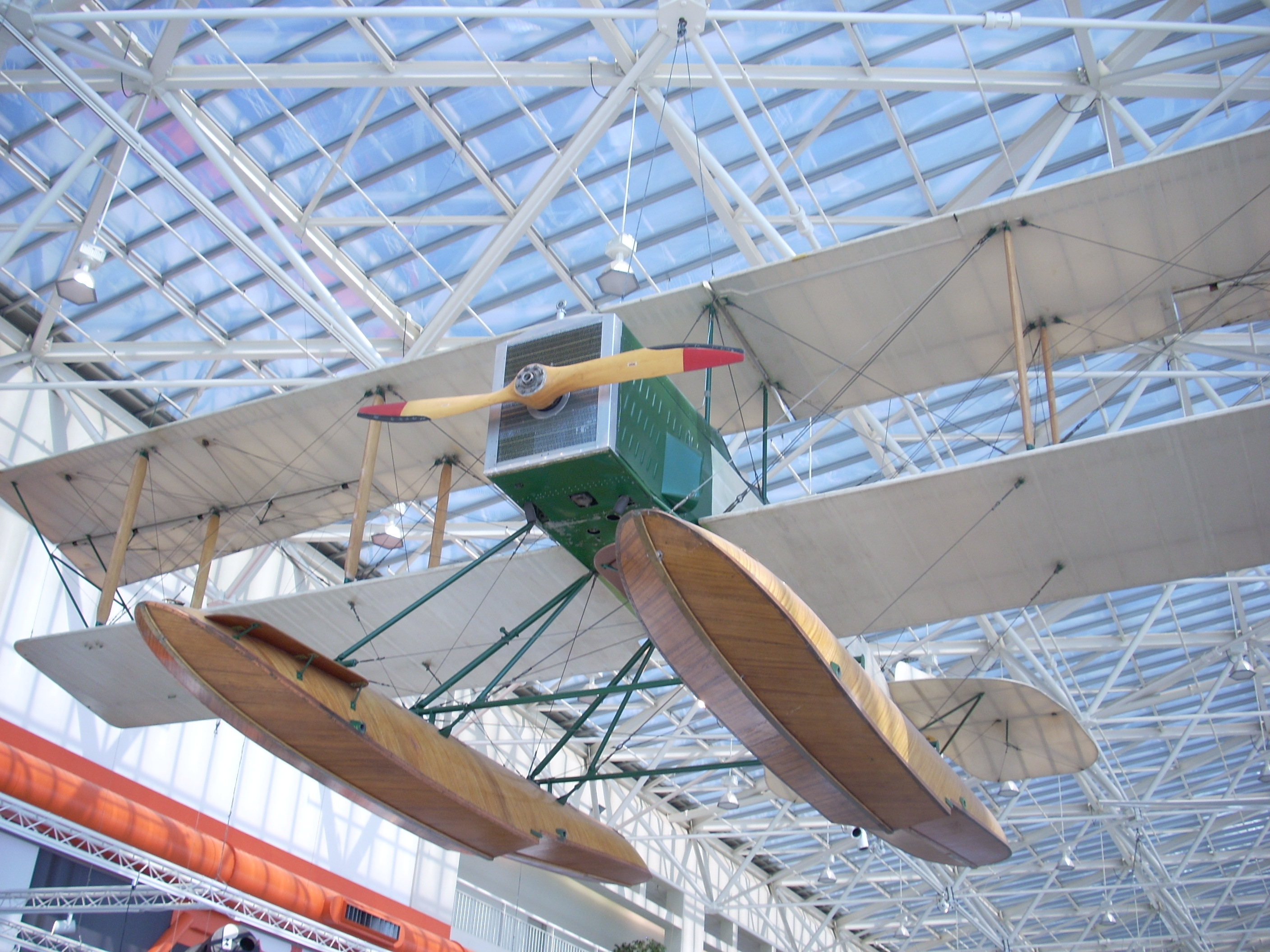
Replica of the B & W Seaplane

=== Founding of Boeing Aircraft ===
In 1916, Boeing went into business with George Conrad Westervelt as "B & W" and founded Pacific Aero Products Co. It was headquartered in the former Heath shipyard. The company's first plane was the Boeing Model 1 (B & W Seaplane). When America entered the First World War on April 8, 1917, Boeing changed the name to Boeing Airplane Company and obtained orders from the US Navy for 50 planes. At the end of the war, Boeing concentrated on commercial aircraft to service airmail contracts. This is when the company really took off.

=== International airmail attempt ===
On March 3, 1919, Willam Boeing partnered with Eddie Hubbard to make the first delivery of international airmail to the United States. They flew a Boeing C-700 seaplane for the demonstration trip from Vancouver, British Columbia, to Seattle's Lake Union, carrying a bag of 60 letters from the Canadian post office for delivery in the U.S.

== Boeing family ==
In 1921, Boeing married Bertha Marie Potter Paschall (1891–1977). She had previously been married to Nathaniel Paschall, a real estate broker with whom she had two sons, Nathaniel "Nat" Paschall Jr. and Cranston Paschall. The couple had a son of their own, William E. Boeing Jr. (1922–2015). The stepsons went into aviation manufacturing as a career. Nat Paschall was a sales manager for competitor Douglas Aircraft, which later became McDonnell Douglas. Bill Jr. became a private pilot and industrial real estate developer.

Bertha Boeing was the daughter of Howard Cranston Potter and Alice Kershaw Potter. Through her father, she was a descendant of the founders of Alex. Brown & Sons merchant bankers Alexander Brown, James Brown, and Brown's son-in-law and partner Howard Potter; and through her mother, the granddaughter of Charles James Kershaw and Mary Leavenworth Kershaw (a descendant of Henry Leavenworth).

== Breakup of Boeing Group ==
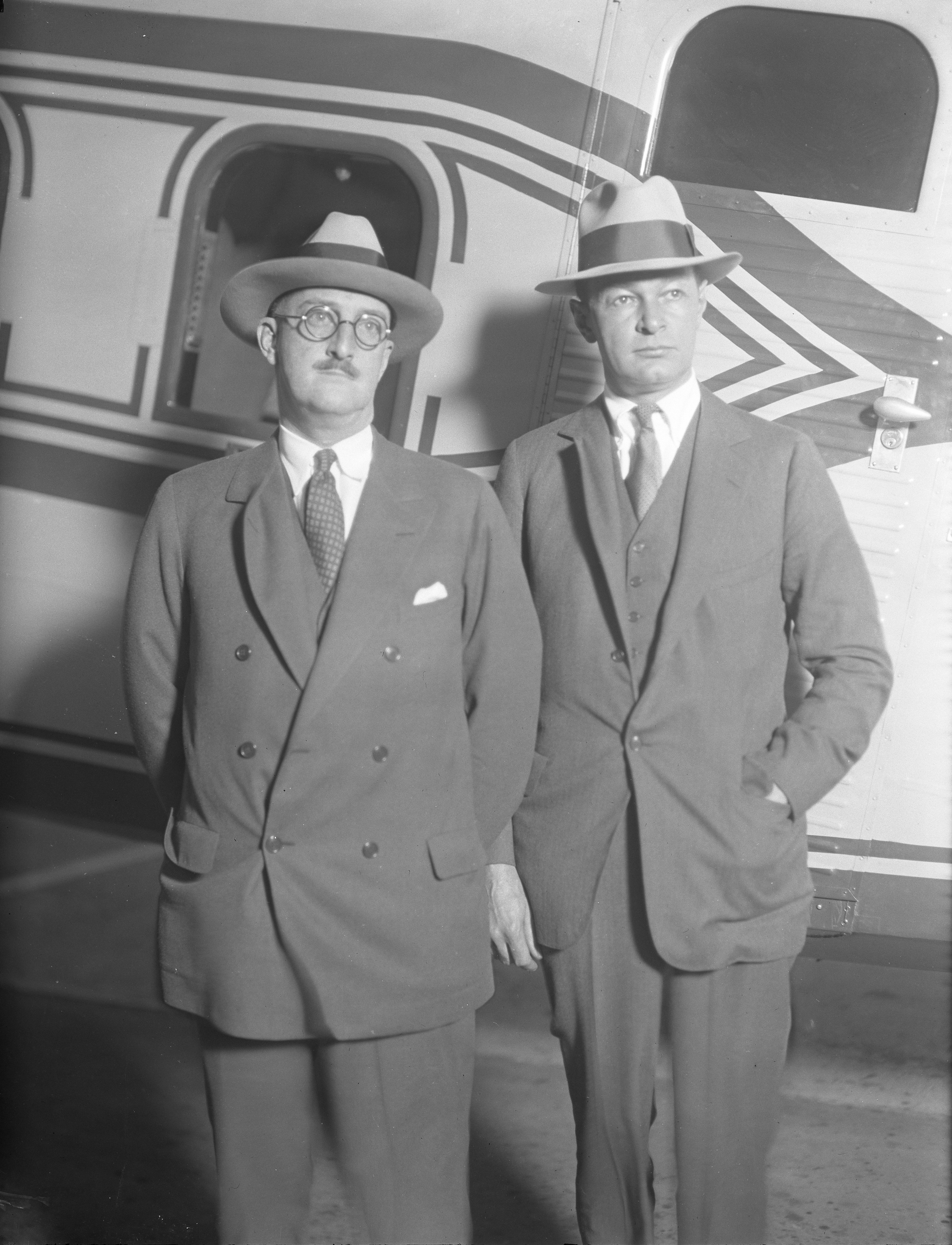
Boeing and Fred Rentschler, 1929

In 1929, Boeing joined with Frederick Rentschler of Pratt & Whitney to form United Aircraft and Transport Corporation, which was established as a holding company. The new grouping was a vertically integrated company with interests in all aspects of aviation, intending to serve all aviation markets. In a short time, it bought a host of small airlines, merging them with Boeing's pioneering airline under a holding company, United Air Lines.

In 1934, the United States government accused William Boeing of monopolistic practices. The same year, the Air Mail Act forced airplane companies to separate flight operations from development and manufacturing. William Boeing divested himself of ownership as his holding company broke up into three separate entities:

- United Aircraft Corporation, holding all of UATC's eastern US manufacturing interests (later United Technologies Corporation)
- Boeing Airplane Company, holding all of UATC's western US manufacturing interests, which later became simply The Boeing Company
- United Air Lines for flight operations

He began investing most of his time in his horses in 1937. Boeing Airplane Company, though a major manufacturer in a fragmented industry, did not become successful until the beginning of World War II.

== Later life ==
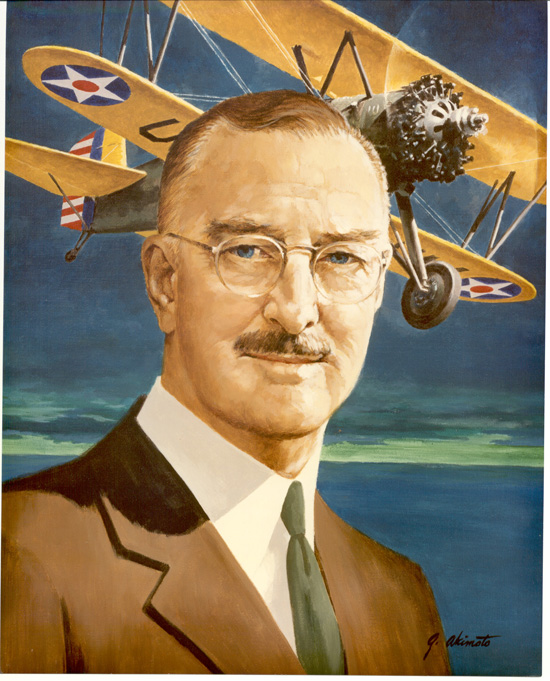
Portrait of Boeing

Between 1935 and 1944, William Boeing and his wife Bertha set aside a large tract of land north of the Seattle city limits for subdivision, including the future communities of Richmond Beach, Richmond Heights, Innis Arden, Blue Ridge, and Shoreview. The Boeings placed racially restrictive covenants on their land to enforce segregation, forbidding properties from being "sold, conveyed, rented, or leased in whole or in part to any person not of the White or Caucasian race." Non-whites could occupy a property on the land only if they were employed as a domestic servant "by a person of the White or Caucasian race."

He spent the remainder of his life in property development and thoroughbred horse breeding. Concerned about the possibility of World War II battles in the Pacific Northwest, he purchased a 650-acre (260 ha) farm in the countryside east of Seattle, which he dubbed "Aldarra." The estate remained in the family until most of the land was developed into a golf course residential community in 2001. Several acres, however, remained in the family, including the Boeing's own and two smaller houses. His primary residence for most of his life, however, was a mansion in The Highlands community close to Seattle; the William E. Boeing House was later listed on the National Register of Historic Places. Boeing Creek running near this property bears his name.

On May 14, 1954, William Boeing and his wife Bertha went back to the Boeing Airplane Company to participate in the rollout ceremony for the Boeing 367-80 prototype.

William Boeing died on September 28, 1956, at the age of 74. His ashes were scattered off the coast of British Columbia, where he spent much of his time sailing.

He was posthumously inducted into the National Aviation Hall of Fame in Dayton, Ohio, in 1966.

In 1984, Boeing was inducted into the International Air & Space Hall of Fame at the San Diego Air & Space Museum. The Museum of Flight, in Seattle holds the William E. Boeing Sr. Papers; an archival collection of Boeing's textual and photographic materials.

== See also ==
- United States airmail service
