= Theatre Annual =

- Discipline: Performance studies
- Language: English

Publication details
- History: 1942-present
- Publisher: College of William & Mary (United States)
- Frequency: Annual

Standard abbreviations
- ISO 4: Theatre Annu.

Indexing
- ISSN: 0082-3821
- OCLC no.: 1767400

Links
- Journal homepage

Theatre Annual: A Journal of Performance Studies is an annual peer-reviewed academic journal that covers the history and ethnography of performance. It was established in 1942 by the Theatre Library Association and initially edited by John Falconeiri and published by the John Cabot International University and Hiram College in Ohio. It was then moved to Akron University and was edited by Wallace Sterling. It is now published in the fall of each year by the College of William & Mary in Virginia.

== Abstracting and indexing ==
The journal is abstracted and indexed in the International Bibliography of Theatre & Dance, Humanities Index, Humanities International Index, International Bibliography of Periodical Literature, and MLA International Bibliography.
