= International students in the United States =

Foreigners taking classes in the US

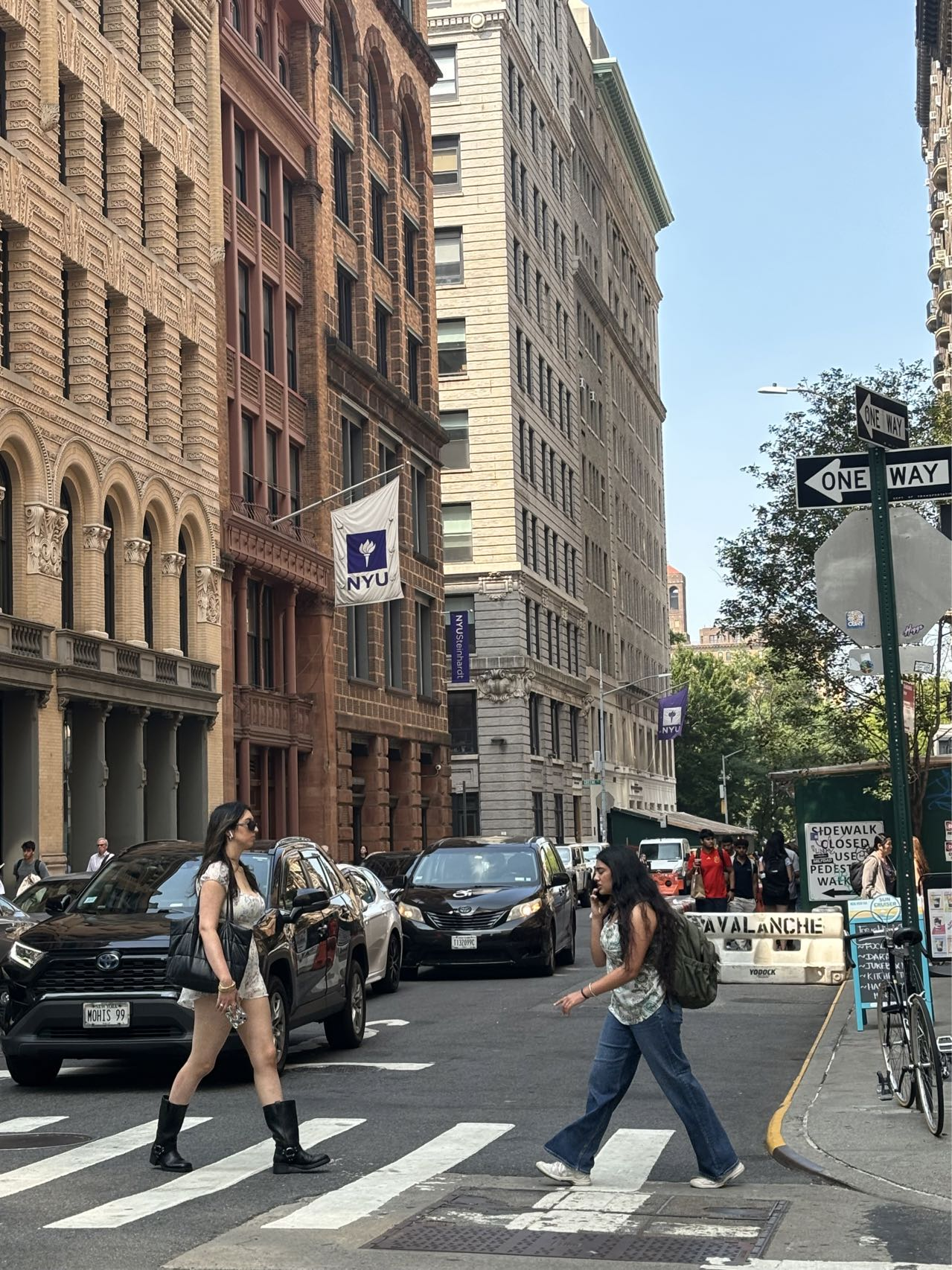

The United States is a popular destination for international students. This can include primary, secondary and post-secondary students. Studying abroad is determined in the United States by political rationales of national security and foreign policy. The number of students studying abroad (this is not the total number of international students, just those here on study abroad programs) represents only about 1% of all students enrolled at institutions of higher education in the United States.

International students are defined as "non-immigrant" visitors who come to the United States temporarily to take classes or take online courses virtually from anywhere in the world. A non-immigrant is someone who meets one or more of the following criteria:

- intends to stay in the US temporarily
- does not have US citizenship or legal permanent resident status (a valid "green card")
- currently is in the US on a non-immigrant visa status (without a valid green card)
- applies for a visa to be allowed entry into the US

== History ==
International education in the United States dates back to the late 19th and early 20th centuries. Following World War II, U.S. policies, such as the Fulbright Program established in 1946, expanded educational exchanges as a diplomatic tool to foster cross-cultural understanding and cooperation. The growth of international students in the U.S. accelerated through the latter half of the 20th century as globalization increased and U.S. universities became prominent in fields like science, technology, and business. According to the Institute of International Education, by 1950, there were around 26,000 international students in the U.S., a number that would rise substantially in subsequent decades as the U.S. strengthened its role in global education.

Due to COVID-19 and the restrictions, there was a significant drop of 72% for new international students enrolling to schools in US compared to 2019.

== Economic Impact of International Students in the U.S. ==
International students play a crucial role in the U.S. economy through their significant financial contributions. Historically, international students have been instrumental in supporting the growth of U.S. higher education and the broader economy. In the 2022–2023 academic year, international students contributed over $40 billion to the U.S. economy, primarily through tuition payments and living expenses. This contribution marked a notable recovery from the pandemic-related decline, reflecting the economic importance of maintaining robust international student enrollment.

=== Historical Context of Economic Contributions ===
The economic impact of international students is not a recent phenomenon. Since the late 20th century, the number of international students in the U.S. has steadily increased, bringing with it substantial economic benefits. For example, in the early 2000s, international students contributed billions to the U.S. economy, supporting the rapid expansion of higher education institutions. The post-9/11 era saw a dip in international student numbers due to stricter visa regulations, but enrollment rebounded in subsequent years, with contributions surpassing $20 billion by the mid-2010s. This growth reflected the increasing reliance of U.S. universities on international tuition fees as state funding for higher education declined.

=== Tuition and Fees ===
A substantial portion of the economic impact stems from the tuition fees paid by international students. In many cases, they pay higher tuition than domestic students, especially at public universities where they do not qualify for in-state rates. These fees are a significant revenue stream for universities, often used to fund scholarships for domestic students and support institutional development. This influx of tuition payments helps stabilize the financial health of higher education institutions across the country. Students may also fill out a FAFSA form if they are in need of financial aid. Although this can be challenging without having family present.

=== Living Expenses ===
In addition to tuition, international students contribute billions through their living expenses. They spend money on housing, food, transportation, health insurance, and other personal needs. This spending not only supports local businesses in college towns and cities but also drives economic activity across various sectors, such as real estate and retail, creating a multiplier effect that benefits the broader economy.

=== Job Creation ===
International students also support job creation in the U.S. During the 2022–2023 academic year, their financial contributions helped support over 368,000 jobs nationwide. This includes jobs in higher education, accommodation, dining, transportation, and various service sectors that benefit from the spending of international students. For every three international students, one job is either created or supported in the U.S. economy, illustrating their role as a significant driver of employment growth. Historically, the job creation impact of international students has been vital for sustaining employment in university towns and cities, particularly during economic downturns when other sources of economic activity may decline.

=== Economic Impact by State ===
The economic contributions of international students are particularly concentrated in certain states. California, New York, Texas, Massachusetts, and Florida are among the top states benefiting from international student spending. These states, which host large numbers of international students, see substantial economic benefits not only for their educational institutions but also for local businesses that serve these students. This geographical distribution underscores the importance of international students to regional economies in addition to the national economy. Historically, these states have relied on international student revenue to offset reductions in state funding and to support community services and infrastructure projects.

In conclusion, international students are vital contributors to the U.S. economy, with impacts that extend beyond their educational institutions. Their spending supports job creation, stimulates local economies, and provides essential revenue to universities, underscoring their importance to the overall economic health of the country. Historically, international students have helped sustain and grow the U.S. economy, particularly during challenging times, making their contributions invaluable both in the past and in the present.

== Countries of origin ==
Top 10 sending places of origin and percentage of total foreign student enrollment 2024–2025
Rank	Country of origin	Number of students		
Rank	Country of origin	Number	Percentage of total	% change
1	India	363,019	30.8%	+9.5%
2	China	265,919	22.6%	−4.1%
3	South Korea	42,293	3.6%	−2.0%
4	Canada	29,903	2.5%	+3.1%
5	Vietnam	25,584	2.2%	+15.9%
6	Nepal	24,890	2.1%	+48.7%
7	Taiwan	23,263	2.0%	+0.5%
8	Nigeria	21,847	1.9%	+8.1%
9	Bangladesh	20,156	1.7%	+17.9%
10	Brazil	17,277	1.5%	+2.4%

=== Indian students in the United States ===
In 2024–2025, there were 363,019 Indian students studying in the United States, the largest of any single country and a 9 per cent increase from the previous academic year. Indian students contributed $5.01 billion to the US economy in 2015–16 according to the Open Doors data 2016.

As per Opendoor's’ 2021 report, India is the second most common place of origin for international students in the United States while ranking at 22 as a study abroad destination for U.S. students. According to a report by the Bureau of Economic Analysis, these international students in 2020 had an economic impact of approximately $6.2 billion. The total number of international students from India in the years 2018–19 and 2019–20 were 202,014 and 193,124 respectively. This number dropped by 13.2% for the year 2020–21. In the academic years 2019–20 and 2020–2021, the applicants in the Graduate and OPT academic level were approximately equal and about 85% of total international students from India. Approximately 14% applied at the undergraduate level while non-degree applicants were the lowest at 1% or less.

The vast majority of international students from India enrolling for study programs choose STEM field. According to OpenDoors’ 2021 report classifying field of study by place of origin, out of the total 167,582 Indian applicants, 33.5% chose to pursue Engineering while 34.8% chose Math or Computer Science as their field of study. Business and Management studies followed far behind at 11.7%. 2023 witnessed approximately 268,923 Indian students choose the US to pursue their higher education, and this number rose to 337,630 in 2024.

=== Chinese students in the United States ===
The first student from China to graduate from an American university was Yung Wing. He graduated from Yale University and helped set up the Chinese Educational Mission.

As part of efforts to normalize relations with China, President Jimmy Carter allowed Chinese students and academics unlimited access to the American higher education system, provided that the costs were not paid by the United States. The approach to educational exchange was different to the one America had with the Soviet Union where "the principle of one equivalent scholar/researcher from the USSR for one equivalent American scholar/researcher reigned."

Many students carry on the purpose of acquiring higher and better education in American universities. Chinese students prefer to study in the US because US education focuses on quality education instead of quantity education followed by Chinese system. According to Kun and David (2010), "Traditional Chinese culture places well-educated scholars in the highest social rank. Academic achievement is also an honour to the family. Dedication to scholarship becomes not only a personal goal but also a culture goal for Chinese international students." Students from wealthy and middle-class families can fund their education and bear the expense of visa and education in the US. According to a survey report by American education technology company Terra Dotta, 58% of students explicitly stated that they chose to study in the U.S. primarily because of the outstanding reputation of U.S. universities. 48% of students were attracted by the curriculum programs offered by U.S. universities, with courses covering a wide range of fields. In addition, 45% of students were attracted by the job prospects in the United States.

Between 2009–2010 and 2023–2024, China was the largest single origin of foreign students until it was overtaken by India. From 2000 to 2019, the number of Chinese students studying in the United States increased from 59,939 students to 369,548 (which was 33.7% of the total international students studying in the United States in 2019). However, due to geopolitical tensions, those numbers have been declining since 2019, falling from 372,532 in 2019–2020 to 265,919 in 2024–2025.

In May 2025, United States Secretary of State Marco Rubio announced the U.S. government would "aggressively revoke visas for Chinese students, including those with connections to the Chinese Communist Party or studying in critical fields". He also announced the U.S. would increase scrutiny of all future visa applications from China and Hong Kong. According to an analysis by The Washington Post in 2026, student visa issues to Chinese citizens dropped sharply in the first eight months of 2025.

== Challenges faced by International Students in the US ==
International Students usually face many difficulties since adapting to a new environment and new habits is often harder than it seems. The United States, being a world apart, is often more difficult to adopt to because of its different laws, policies and way of life. Some of the challenges international students face include: Language barriers, cultural differences, mental health issues and homesickness among many others.

=== Mental Health ===
In huma beings, going from stage of life to another is usually very demanding and often stressful. As we grow up, transitioning from adolescence in secondary and higher education to adulthood in university is very difficult. It often is a jump that is difficult to make. Anxiety and overwhelming experiences often makes it even harder. For International Students, this transition is stepped up to another level. Not only do they have to start a new adventure in a new life stage, but equally have to do so in a completely different environment to which they must adapt. They face several difficulties and are often misunderstood, these push them to isolation and causes anxiety, depression, psychological distress and other mental health issues.

== See also ==
- Visa and deportation controversies in the second Trump administration
