= The SunBreak =

- Available in: English
- Founded: 2009
- Headquarters: Seattle, Washington, {{{location_country}}}
- Website: The SunBreak

The SunBreak is an online magazine in Seattle, Washington, founded in September 2009 by Michael van Baker, formerly an editor for Seattlest.

The SunBreak's coverage of a 2011 bicyclist fatality was noted by major conventional media outlets Seattle Post-Intelligencer and KPLU News. SunBreak is listed as a significant media outlet for Cascade Bicycle Club's bicycle advocacy campaigns.
