= The Highlands (Seattle) =

Gated community north of Seattle

Coordinates: 47°44′37″N 122°22′09″W

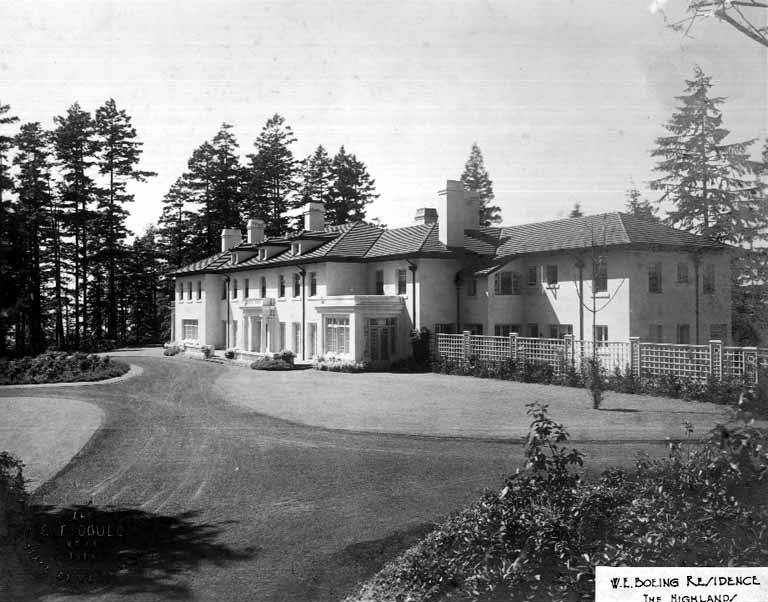
William Boeing residence in the Highlands

The Highlands is a gated community founded in 1907 adjacent to Seattle, Washington's Broadview neighborhood, 12 mi (19 km) north of Downtown Seattle. In 1995 The Highlands became part of the city of Shoreline.

The neighborhood has been the home to the Boeing, Nordstrom, Pigott and Stimson families. Access to the community is through a security gate which is west of North 145th Street and Greenwood Avenue North.

== History ==
The Highlands is adjacent to the Seattle Golf Club; together they occupy 380 acres (150 ha). The land for both was purchased by the club in 1907, and The Highlands is built on part of the club's land that exceeded the area needed for a golf course. Initial purchase of lots in The Highlands was limited to members of the golf club. Originally landscaped in 1907 by the Olmsted Brothers, The Highlands sits 450 feet (140 m) above Puget Sound. Prior to the homes being built, tracts in the development were distributed during a draw from a hat. Originally the neighborhood consisted of 50 tracts, currently there are 112 lots and 66 acres (27 ha) set aside for reservation or park property. Businessman Horace Chapin Henry was an original tract owner and donated the Florence Henry Memorial Chapel, which was built in 1911 and is now a part of St. Dunstan's Church of the Highlands Parish, Shoreline, Washington.

The Highlands was once an unincorporated suburb of Seattle and has always operated much like an independent city. In 1995 it became a part of the city of Shoreline. The Highlands has its own sewage system and roads which are property of the home owners association. The neighborhood has its own water source, street maintenance, and grounds keepers, making it almost completely independent of all third party utilities.

Highlands residents have hosted numerous dignitaries, including President John F. Kennedy, who was a guest at the home of Theilene Pigott McCone and her husband John McCone, then Director of the Central Intelligence Agency. In 1994, the wedding reception for Bill Gates and his wife Melinda was held in the ballroom of the former Pigott McCone estate, a private home in the community.

== Joining the Commons ==
Purchasing a home in The Highlands requires potential residents to submit an application to the Highlands Board, usually provided by the listing real estate agent. As of 2007, the board requires two sponsors; one of the sponsors is usually the seller of the home and the second is another current resident with whom the purchaser has been previously acquainted. If the potential resident of the home does not know a second member, the seller of the home often arranges a cocktail reception with the neighbors to acquaint the potential resident with current members who become the second sponsor. The Highlands HOA requires all major construction or renovation to be approved by the Buildings and Sites Committee of the Board.

== Addresses ==
Prior to joining the city of Shoreline in 1995, for security reasons homes in The Highlands did not have physical street addresses. Instead, all mail was addressed to the name of the resident with the rest of the address written as "The Highlands, Seattle, WA 98177".

== Notable residents ==
- William Boeing, founder of Boeing; his house in the community is listed on the National Register of Historic Places
- Malcolm T. Stamper, former president of Boeing
- John McCone, former Director of the Central Intelligence Agency, Chairman of the United States Atomic Energy Commission, Deputy to the United States Secretary of Defense and United States Under Secretary of the Air Force.
- Carl Sagan, famed astronomer, rented a home in the community while receiving cancer treatment prior to his death in 1996
- William McPherson Allen, former CEO of Boeing
- John McCaw, Jr., former owner of McCaw Cellular
- Craig McCaw, founder of Clearwire
- Nick Hanauer, CEO of the Pacific Coast Feather Company and a venture capitalist
- Virginia and Bagley Wright, daughter and son-in-law of Prentice Bloedel
- Mike McGavick, former CEO of Safeco Insurance
- Kerry Killinger, former CEO of Washington Mutual Bank
- John Fluke Sr., founder of the Fluke Corporation
- Dorothy Bullitt, a founder of King Broadcasting Company and daughter of lumber and real estate magnate C. D. Stimson
- Chris Larson, a retired Microsoft executive
- Frederick Ayer II, grandson of American Woolen Company founder Frederick Ayer
- Paul and Theilene Pigott, former president of Pacific Car and Foundry (Paccar) and son of its founder, along with his wife who remarried as Theilene Pigott McCone after his death.

== See also ==
- Neighborhoods of Shoreline, Washington
