= William E. Boeing House =

Historic house in Washington, United States

- U.S. National Register of Historic Places
- Location within Washington (state)
- Location: Huckleberry Lane, Shoreline, Washington
- Coordinates: 47°44′50″N 122°22′18″W
- Area: 5 acres (2.0 ha)
- Built: 1914
- Architect: Charles Bebb
- Architectural style: Mediterranean Revival
- NRHP reference No.: 88002743
- Added to NRHP: December 16, 1988

The William E. Boeing House is a historic mansion located in the gated community of The Highlands in Shoreline, Washington.

== Description and history ==
The house is named after William Boeing, the founder of The Boeing Company, who named it Aldarra. Located at the edge of a wooded bluff overlooking Puget Sound, it was completed in 1914, and was designed by Charles Bebb in the Mediterranean Revival style with a white stucco façade and red tile roof, and eight fireplaces. The floorplan is approximately 19,000 square feet (1,800 m^{2}).

Boeing occupied the house from its completion until 1954, when he moved to his country estate near Fall City, Washington, and donated the property to Children's Orthopedic Hospital, now known as Seattle Children's. The hospital sold the property to J. Elroy McCaw shortly after acquiring it, and it was sold again after McCaw's death in 1969.

The house is listed on the National Register of Historic Places. It is a private residence and not open to the public.

== See also ==
- National Register of Historic Places listings in King County, Washington
