= Bothell, Washington =

Bothell
- City
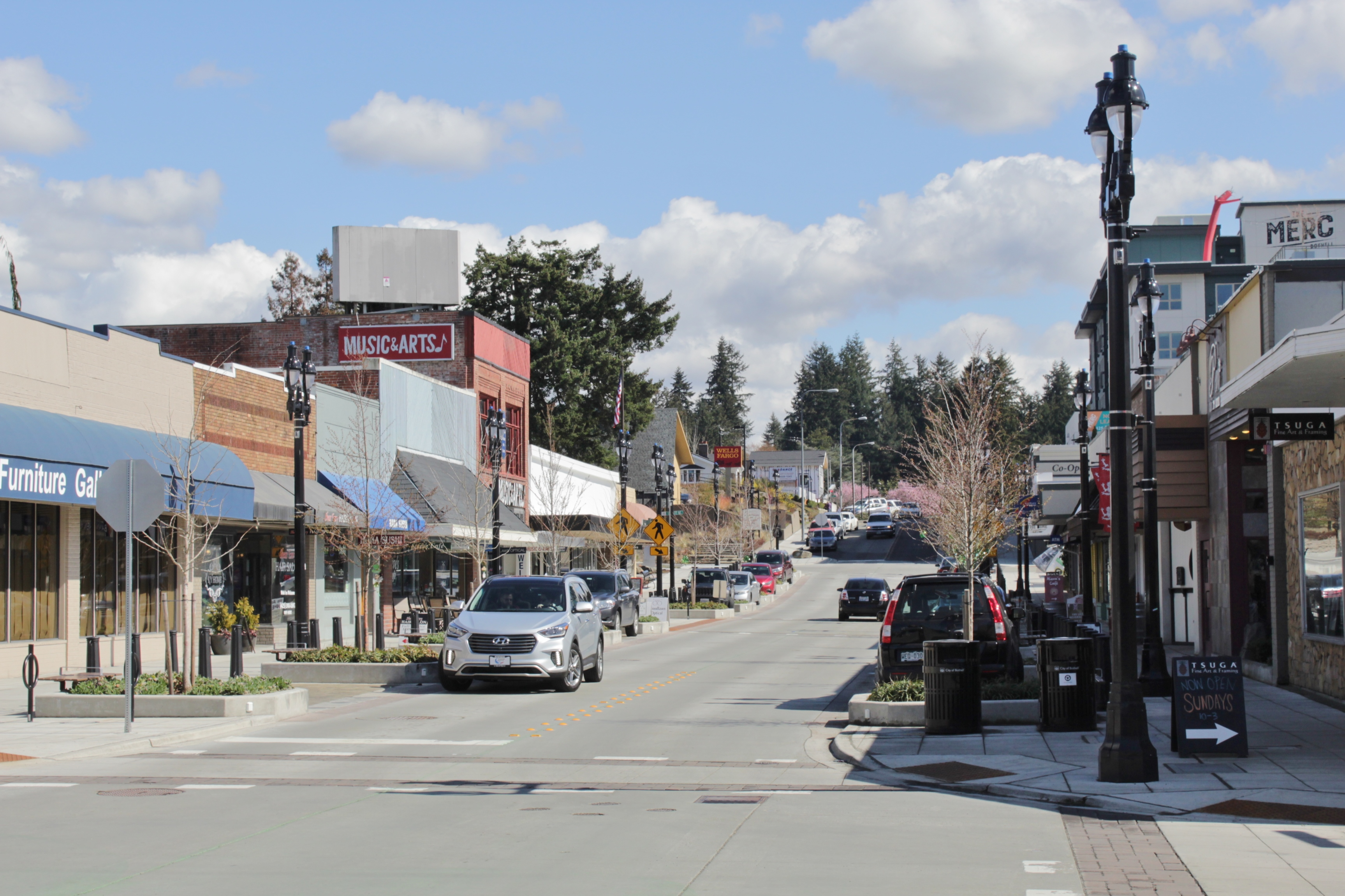
- Main Street in Bothell

- Logo
- Motto: Welcome to Bothell for a day, or a lifetime
- Interactive map of Bothell
- Coordinates: 47°45′28″N 122°12′09″W
- Country: United States
- State: Washington
- Counties: King, Snohomish
- Incorporated: April 14, 1909

Government
  - Type: Council–manager
  - Mayor: Mason Thompson
  - City manager: Kyle Stannert

Area
  - Total: 13.64 sq mi (35.3 km^{2})
  - Land: 13.64 sq mi (35.3 km^{2})
  - Water: 0.00 sq mi (0 km^{2})
- Elevation: 302 ft (92 m)

Population (2020)
  - Total: 48,161
  - Estimate (2024): 51,770
  - Density: 3,530.87/sq mi (1,363.28/km^{2})
- Time zone: UTC-8 (PST)
  - Summer (DST): UTC-7 (PDT)
- ZIP code: 98011 (King), 98012, 98021 (Snohomish), 98041 (P.O. boxes)
- Area code: 425
- FIPS code: 53-07380
- GNIS feature ID: 2409882
- Website: bothellwa.gov

Bothell (/ˈbɒθəl/) is a city in King and Snohomish counties in the U.S. state of Washington. It is part of the Seattle metropolitan area, situated near the northeast end of Lake Washington in the Eastside region. It had a population of 48,161 residents as of the 2020 census.

The city lies along the Sammamish River, the historic home of the indigenous Sammamish people, and is adjacent to Kenmore and Woodinville. It was established in 1870 and platted by David Bothell and his family in 1888, shortly before the arrival of railroads in the area. The town was incorporated in 1909 and originally relied on logging and farming; in the mid-20th century, it became a bedroom community for workers commuting to Seattle and later other Eastside cities. Interstate 405 connects the city to other areas of the Eastside and functions as a bypass of Seattle.

Bothell's modern economy is centered around biotechnology and high-tech companies that have facilities that were developed in the late 20th century along North Creek and in the Canyon Park neighborhood, which was annexed by the city in 1992. The annexation also expanded the city limits into Snohomish County. The University of Washington Bothell was established in 1990 and opened its permanent shared campus with Cascadia College in 2000. Bothell redeveloped its downtown in the 2010s and 2020s and has seen an increase in residential density and its population as a result.

== History ==
The Sammamish River valley from Lake Washington to Issaquah Creek was first inhabited by the indigenous Sammamish people (Lushootseed: sc̓ababš), a Coast Salish group with an estimated population of 80 to 200 around 1850. The Sammamish had a major winter village, ƛ̕ax̌ʷadis, at the mouth of the Sammamish River, between what is now Bothell and Kenmore. Although the Sammamish resisted removal efforts by settlers, they were eventually removed to Fort Kitsap following the 1855–1856 Puget Sound War. Some Sammamish continued to live in the area and worked as laborers and farmers, but the village of ƛ̕ax̌ʷadis was later destroyed.

The first Homestead Act claims to modern-day Bothell were filed in 1870 by Columbus S. Greenleaf and George R. Wilson, an English immigrant, on adjoining plots of land. The area along the lower Sammamish River, then named Squak Slough, was mostly marshlands and had not been surveyed at the time of Wilson's arrival; Greenleaf filed for his claim in June 1870 on land that Wilson had originally sought. Eight families settled in the area in the next six years and were followed by Canadian businessman George Brackett, who began commercial logging in 1877 on 80 acres (32 ha) on the modern-day site of Wayne Golf Course. Brackett also established Brackett's Landing, which had a sawmill and steamboat dock served by traffic from Seattle and Issaquah.

In 1884, Brackett sold 80 acres (32 ha) of his timberland to David Bothell, a settler and American Civil War veteran from Pennsylvania. Bothell and his two sons built a home and shingle mill on the property the following year and later opened a boarding house with his wife. The boarding house was destroyed by a fire and replaced by the Bothell Hotel at another location, where the townsite was platted on April 25, 1888. The settlement was named for the Bothell family by the first postmaster Gerhard Ericksen, who had bought the boarding house property. At the time, the area had two hotels, several lumber mills, and a school. Bothell originally shared schools with Woodinville until a separate school district was established in 1885; the first classes at Bothell's schoolhouse were held in March 1886. The school district was merged with North Creek in 1897 and ten years later, a dedicated school building was constructed to accommodate the growing student population.

The Seattle, Lake Shore and Eastern Railway was constructed along the Sammamish River to connect Seattle to the transcontinental Northern Pacific Railway as well as coal from mines near Issaquah. The tracks reached Bothell in November 1888 and a boxcar was placed at Brackett's Landing to serve as a temporary station; it was moved east to Bothell in 1890 and later replaced by a depot building. A county road was built between Bothell and neighboring Woodinville to the east. Several logging railroads were also constructed in the Bothell area, stretching as far north as modern-day Canyon Park, to transport logs to local mills; one included a trestle bridge across the Sammamish River. Bothell grew rapidly following the railroad's opening; by the end of the 1880s, it had telegraph service, a general store, a butcher, and a drugstore with a practicing doctor. Many of the new residents were Scandinavian or Eastern European immigrants, along with emigrants from the Midwest. The first churches in the area were established by these immigrants in the mid-1880s. Two of the local mills were destroyed in fires in 1893 and 1894 and were later replaced with a larger facility that produced 80,000 shingles per day.

=== Early 20th century ===
Bothell was incorporated as a fourth-class town on April 14, 1909, eight days after a narrow 79–70 vote in favor. George Bothell, one of the sons of David Bothell and a former state legislator, was elected as the first mayor. At the time, the town had a population of 599 residents, a bank, four general stores, and three saloons. A dozen buildings on Main Street were destroyed or damaged by a fire on April 11, 1911, including the Ericksen general store where the town's records had been kept. A fire department was established in 1913 and new building regulations were enacted by the town government in response to the fire. The Pacific Highway was completed through the town in August 1912, connecting to Everett and Seattle. A 4-mile (6.4 km) section west of Bothell was the first to be paved in brick; it was inaugurated on May 29, 1913, by Washington governor Ernest Lister.

Steamship traffic on the Sammamish River waned after the arrival of the railroad and completion of the Pacific Highway. The river itself was dredged and straightened by the Army Corps of Engineers in 1916. The water level on Lake Washington was lowered by nine feet (2.7 m) by the opening of the Lake Washington Ship Canal in Seattle the following year; the lowering prevented several steamships and other riverboats from traversing the mouth of the Sammamish River. By the end of the decade, Bothell had a water system, telephone service, a library, and several fraternal organizations with chapters or lodges in the area. The logging economy declined during the early 20th century and was replaced by agriculture on the cleared land, including dairy and poultry farms. Passenger traffic on the railroad, now under the management of Northern Pacific, ceased in 1938.

A new high school was opened in 1923 and followed by an adjacent junior high school building in 1931, now known as the Anderson School. Several civic projects were completed during the Great Depression by the Works Progress Administration, including construction of a new town hall that also housed the fire department and library when it opened in 1938. Bothell remained a rural community until the development of suburban housing areas after World War II as the Seattle metropolitan area experienced a major population boom. A new high school opened in 1953 along with five elementary schools by the end of the decade to accommodate a growing number of students. The first major annexations in the town's history were made in 1954; by the end of the decade, the boundaries extended south of the Sammamish River.

=== Mid-to-late 20th century ===
Bothell was reclassified as a city in 1960 after its population had surpassed the state's threshold for cityhood—1,500 residents. The city's sewer system was completed that same year and the water system was switched from local wells to the Tolt pipeline, operated by Seattle Public Utilities, in 1963. The sewage system was incorporated into the Municipality of Metropolitan Seattle system in 1967, which bypassed its outflow to Lake Washington but restricted new residential development south of the Sammamish River. Bothell developed further into a bedroom community after the completion of Interstate 405 in 1968, which passes east of downtown and intersects State Route 522. Another routing for the freeway west of the city was also considered before it was rejected, along with a later proposal to route State Route 522 on a freeway around the south side of downtown. By 1970, Bothell had annexed neighborhoods as far east as the outskirts of Woodinville, then seeking annexation or incorporation. The city's mayor–council government was replaced by a council–manager system in 1973 following voter approval of a proposition the year before.

In 1974, plans to build a regional shopping mall were announced on the site of a 142-acre (57 ha) truck farm adjacent to the Interstate 405 and State Route 522 interchange east of downtown Bothell. It was described as similar in size to Southcenter Mall in Tukwila and would include a motel, two movie theaters, and office space. The city government sought the new shopping mall to improve its local tax base and approved a rezoning of the property for commercial use, but the proposal was opposed by local environmental groups due to the potential impact on North Creek, which flows through the site. The environmental groups filed a lawsuit against the city government over the rezoning, which the King County Superior Court found to violate state laws on land use fairness and conflicts of interest within the planning commission. The ruling was upheld by the Washington Supreme Court in 1978 and the property was instead rezoned into an office park under new regulations for the North Creek Valley, which was designated as a special district.

The remaining farmland in the North Creek Valley was developed into facilities for high tech and light industrial companies beginning in the 1980s, encompassing 1.8 million square feet (170,000 m^{2}) of office space. The developments were required by the special district to restore wetlands along North Creek and other waterways as part of environmental mitigation, but the artificial wetlands initially saw limited success in controlling invasive species and regulating soils. Bothell continued to develop into a center of high tech employment alongside Canyon Park, an unincorporated area to the north in Snohomish County, with a combined 4,300 jobs added between 1985 and 1987. Several office parks were also developed in nearby Woodinville, which Bothell unsuccessfully attempted to annex in 1985 for a shopping center; the community later incorporated as a separate city in 1993.

In 1990, the University of Washington opened its northern branch campus in Bothell at an office park building. A permanent campus, shared with Cascadia Community College, opened in September 2000 at a site that was originally proposed for a separate shopping mall east of downtown; the mall had been blocked by the Washington State Department of Ecology due to its effects on wetlands near North Creek. Bothell annexed the Canyon Park area in 1992, becoming a dual-county city and nearly doubling its population by adding 11,400 people. The annexation prevented the competing proposal for a new city, tentatively named North Creek, from claiming the area and its existing industrial parks that employed 20,000 people. The addition of Canyon Park and additional development increased Bothell's population by 144 percent to over 30,000 residents by 2000. The 1990s also saw more technology businesses relocate to Bothell, including biotechnology firms, call centers, and manufacturers of medical equipment and electronics.

=== 21st century ===
The city government commissioned a plan in 2000 to address worsening traffic congestion throughout Bothell that was blamed, in part, on recent development. The plan would use additional street connections to form a more cohesive grid, but was negatively received by residents who opposed higher traffic volumes. A separate plan to widen portions of State Route 527 (the Bothell–Everett Highway) was completed in 2005 using funding from commercial development along the corridor. In the late 2000s, the city government adopted a downtown plan to revitalize Main Street and add denser housing and mixed-use development in the area. The plan involved the acquisition of various parcels and demolition of 15 buildings to allow for roadwork and the expansion of the Park at Bothell Landing.

Construction of the $150 million downtown redevelopment program began in 2010 with the realignment of State Route 522 at its intersection with the Bothell–Everett Highway, which was completed in 2013. The Bothell–Everett Highway was rebuilt as a wide boulevard in 2017 that includes separate laneways for parking and landscaped dividers. A new city hall opened in October 2015 to consolidate several city departments into one building. The city also annexed 1,005 additional acres (407 ha) of King County in 2014 and added 6,000 residents. The downtown redevelopment yielded 1,300 new apartment units and townhouses by 2020, including middle housing. Between 2010 and 2020, Bothell's population increased by more than 40 percent and the share of minority residents also increased to 33 percent.

A major fire in downtown broke out at the Mercantile Building on July 22, 2016, damaging and closing more than 20 businesses. Among the destroyed buildings was the Bothell Mall, which housed several small businesses. The fire hindered the Main Street portion of the redevelopment program and required $4.7 million in state aid for rebuilding. Main Street was rebuilt as a shared space between vehicles and other modes with curbless sidewalks and parallel parking separated by dining areas and planter boxes. A one-block section was closed to all vehicular traffic in June 2020 during the COVID-19 pandemic to encourage its use as an outdoor gathering space and dining area to revitalize business in downtown. The program was successful and became a permanent fixture during the summer months.

== Geography ==
Bothell is located along the Sammamish River near its mouth at the northeast end of Lake Washington. It is one of six cities in Washington that are in multiple counties, as the city straddles King and Snohomish counties. The boundary between the counties is at Northeast 205th Street / 244th Street Southwest; because most streets in Bothell are numbered and not named, north–south streets that cross the county line often change numbers. According to the United States Census Bureau, the city of Bothell has a total area of 13.64 square miles (35.33 km^{2}), all of it classified as land. The city is predominantly suburban, with 41.4 percent of land area zoned for single-family homes, 13 percent for denser housing, 10.5 percent for parks and open space, and 8 percent for commercial development.

The city's western border with Kenmore follows 86th and 84th avenues, with the exception of Inglemoor High School; within Snohomish County, the western border follows 7th Place West. The northern city limits of Bothell is defined by 216th Street Southwest on the west side of Interstate 405 and State Route 524 (Maltby Road) through Thrasher's Corner. The eastern boundary follows 35th Avenue Southeast in Snohomish County; on the King County site, it is shared with Woodinville and follows 130th Avenue Northeast on the north side of the Sammamish River and 124th Avenue Northeast on the south side of the river. The southern border with Kirkland follows Simonds Road and Northeast 145th Street to Interstate 405 and jumps north to follow part of the Tolt pipeline right-of-way. The city's urban growth area in Snohomish County includes unincorporated areas that border Brier to the west and Mill Creek to the north.

Most of the city lies in the drainage basins of the Sammamish River or its tributaries North Creek and Swamp Creek; a portion also lies in the Juanita Creek basin, which drains directly into Lake Washington. These creeks are also home to spawning Kokanee salmon, Chinook salmon, bull trout, and other freshwater fish. The Sammamish River formed following the retreat of the Cordilleran ice sheet during the Vashon Glaciation period approximately 15,000 years before present. The glaciers cut across several north–south channels that now form Bothell's seven hills, which include areas south of the Sammamish River that are prone to landslides. The highest point in the city is Nike Hill, named for its former Nike missile silo, that sits 510 feet (160 m) above sea level. Bothell has several wetlands, including a 58-acre (23 ha) area along North Creek that was restored by University of Washington Bothell in the 2000s. Since its restoration, the wetlands have become home to large groups of crows, up to 16,000 at a time, that commute from around the Seattle region to roost in Bothell. The university hosts an annual "Crow Watch" event in November with presentations and a viewing party.

=== Subareas and neighborhoods ===
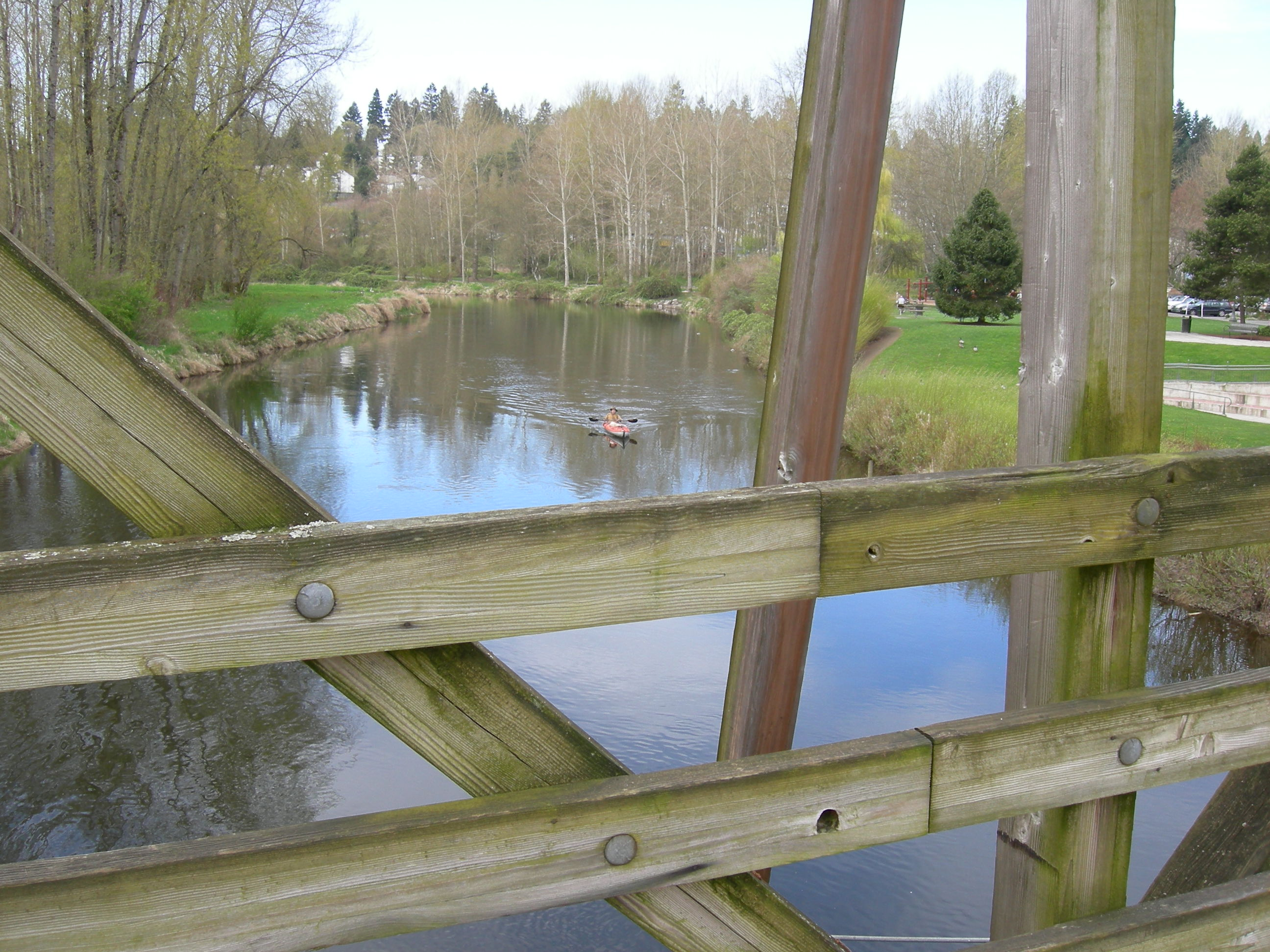
The Sammamish River near downtown Bothell

As part of the city's comprehensive plan, Bothell's neighborhoods and districts are organized into planning subareas for zoning regulation purposes. As of 2023, Bothell has 17 recognized subareas, four of which include portions of the urban growth area outside the city limits.

- Bloomberg Hill is located at the eastern edge of the city and is primarily in King County
- Brickyard Road/Queensgate is in the southeastern corner of Bothell, bound to the west by Interstate 405 and to the north by State Route 522
- Canyon Creek/39th Avenue SE is in the northeastern quarter of the city
- Canyon Park is on the northern edge of the city proper and includes commercial and industrial areas
- Damson/Logan lies outside of the northwestern city limits along the southwest side of Interstate 405
- Downtown Bothell is situated along the north side of the Sammamish River between Westhill and Interstate 405 and includes a commercial district and mixed-use residential buildings
- Filbert/Winesap lies outside of the northern city limits along the northeast side of Interstate 405
- Fitzgerald/35th Avenue SE is located northeast of Interstate 405 along North Creek
- Locust/14th Avenue W lies outside the western city limits in unincorporated Snohomish County
- Maywood/Beckstrom Hill is north of Downtown Bothell and east of the Bothell–Everett Highway
- North Creek/NE 195th Street includes office and industrial areas along North Creek east of Interstate 405 and Downtown Bothell
- Queensborough/Brentwood/Crystal Springs is at the northwest corner of the city limits and generally lies west of Interstate 405
- Red Barn is situated along the Bothell–Everett Highway between downtown and Canyon Park
- Shelton View/Meridian/3rd Avenue SE is on the western edge of the city proper within Snohomish County
- Thrasher's Corner/Red Hawk is northeast of the city limits on the north side of State Route 524. It is named for the Thrasher family, who opened a grocery store and gas station at the corner of the Bothell–Everett Highway and Filbert Road (now State Route 524) in 1928.
- Waynita/Simonds/Norway Hill includes all of the neighborhoods south of the Sammamish River and west of Interstate 405. It is also home to the former Wayne Golf Course, now a city-owned parkland.
- Westhill is west of downtown and primarily in King County

== Demographics ==
Bothell, Washington – Racial and ethnic composition Note: the US Census treats Hispanic/Latino as an ethnic category. This table excludes Latinos from the racial categories and assigns them to a separate category. Hispanics/Latinos may be of any race.
Race / Ethnicity (NH = Non-Hispanic)	Pop 2000	Pop 2010	Pop 2020	% 2000	% 2010	% 2020
White alone (NH)	25,581	25,235	30,398	84.85%	75.32%	63.12%
Black or African American alone (NH)	341	486	903	1.13%	1.45%	1.87%
Native American or Alaska Native alone (NH)	182	141	194	0.60%	0.42%	0.40%
Asian alone (NH)	1,783	3,376	8,466	5.91%	10.08%	17.58%
Native Hawaiian or Pacific Islander alone (NH)	59	56	97	0.20%	0.17%	0.20%
Other race alone (NH)	62	71	345	0.21%	0.21%	0.72%
Mixed race or Multiracial (NH)	804	1,229	3,311	2.67%	3.67%	6.87%
Hispanic or Latino (any race)	1,338	2,911	4,447	4.44%	8.69%	9.23%
Total	30,150	33,505	48,161	100.00%	100.00%	100.00%

Historical population
Census	Pop.	Note	%±
1910	599		—
1920	613		2.3%
1930	818		33.4%
1940	794		−2.9%
1950	1,019		28.3%
1960	2,237		119.5%
1970	5,420		142.3%
1980	7,943		46.5%
1990	12,345		55.4%
2000	30,150		144.2%
2010	33,505		11.1%
2020	48,161		43.7%
2024 (est.)	51,770		7.5%
U.S. Decennial Census

Bothell is the 26th-largest city in Washington, with a population of 48,161 people as of the 2020 U.S. census. The city grew significantly in the 1950s, 1990s, and 2000s from the annexation of surrounding areas and suburban development. Between 2010 and 2020, Bothell's population grew by 44 percent, faster than any other city in Snohomish County and among the fastest rates in the Puget Sound region. As of 2020, 60 percent of the city's population resides in King County and 40 percent in Snohomish County.

The city has a large concentration of Asian Americans, of which 33 percent identified as Indian and 29 percent identified as Chinese in 2020. Approximately 20 percent of Bothell residents in 2020 were born outside the United States, an increase from 11 percent reported in 2000.

The 2021 American Community Survey estimated that the median household income of the city's residents was $116,578, higher than the averages for King and Snohomish counties. An evaluation by Public Health – Seattle & King County in 2016 found that residents of Bothell and Woodinville had lower prevalence of health issues and a life expectancy of 83.4 years, higher than the King County and Washington average.

=== 2020 census ===
As of the 2020 census, there were 48,161 people and 19,149 households living in Bothell, which had a population density of 2,765.6 inhabitants per square mile (1,067.8/km^{2}). There were 20,138 total housing units, of which 95.1% were occupied and 4.9% were vacant or for occasional use. The racial makeup of the city was 65.0% White, 0.6% Native American and Alaskan Native, 1.9% Black or African American, 17.7% Asian, and 0.2% Native Hawaiian and Pacific Islander. Residents who listed another race were 4.0% of the population and those who identified as more than one race were 10.6% of the population. Hispanic or Latino residents of any race were 9.2% of the population.

Of the 19,149 households in Bothell, 32.2% had children under the age of 18 living with them, 52.9% were married couples living together, and 6.7% were cohabitating but unmarried. Households with a male householder with no spouse or partner were 16.9% of the population, while households with a female householder with no spouse or partner were 23.6% of the population. Out of all households, 26.7% had residents who were 65 years of age or older. There were 19,149 occupied housing units in Bothell, of which 61.6% were owner-occupied and 38.4% were occupied by renters.

The median age in the city was 37.9 years old for all sexes, 36.9 years old for males, and 38.9 years old for females. Of the total population, 23.9% of residents were under the age of 19; 30.6% were between the ages of 20 and 39; 31.7% were between the ages of 40 and 64; and 14.7% were 65 years of age or older. The gender makeup of the city was 49.1% male and 50.9% female.

=== 2010 census ===
As of the 2010 U.S. census, there were 33,505 people, 13,497 households, and 8,779 families residing in the city. The population density was 2,764.4 inhabitants per square mile (1,067.3/km^{2}). There were 14,255 housing units at an average density of 1,176.2 per square mile (454.1/km^{2}). The racial makeup of the city was 79.7% White, 1.6% African American, 0.6% Native American, 10.2% Asian, 0.2% Pacific Islander, 3.4% from other races, and 4.5% from two or more races. Hispanic or Latino of any race were 8.7% of the population.

There were 13,497 households, of which 32.0% had children under the age of 18 living with them, 51.9% were married couples living together, 9.1% had a female householder with no husband present, 4.1% had a male householder with no wife present, and 35.0% were non-families. 27.2% of all households were made up of individuals, and 8.9% had someone living alone who was 65 years of age or older. The average household size was 2.46 and the average family size was 3.00.

The median age in the city was 38.3 years. 22.4% of residents were under the age of 18; 8.1% were between the ages of 18 and 24; 29.3% were from 25 to 44; 28.1% were from 45 to 64; and 12.1% were 65 years of age or older. The gender makeup of the city was 48.8% male and 51.2% female.

== Economy ==
Largest employers in Bothell (2022)
Rank	Employer	Employees
1	Northshore School District	4,525
2	AT&T Mobility	1,838
3	Seagen	1,655
4	Philips Ultrasound	1,205
5	University of Washington Bothell	799
6	T-Mobile US	601
7	AGC Biologics	525
8	Fujifilm Sonosite	516
9	Google	388
10	City of Bothell	384

As of 2022, Bothell has an estimated workforce population of 37,721 residents with 68.8 percent who are employed according to an annual survey from the United States Census Bureau. The largest industry sectors for the city's residents were professional and scientific services (24.4%) and educational services (18.1%). According to a city study from 2022, approximately 28,778 workers commute into Bothell for work while 19,813 residents travel elsewhere for work; the most common destinations for commuters from Bothell include Seattle (29%), Bellevue (14%), Redmond (12%), and Kirkland (8%), while 9.1 percent of workforce residents are employed in the city. The mean commute travel time was 30.2 minutes with more than 57 percent of residents driving alone to work, 26 percent working from home, and under 6 percent using public transportation.

The city also had approximately 28,025 jobs provided by private sector businesses, of which the largest industry sectors in 2021 were professional and scientific services (15.4%), manufacturing (15.3%), and information (12.8%). Most of these jobs are on the King County side of the city, with the exception of the manufacturing sector. The largest share of commuters to employers in Bothell are from Seattle (10.5%), Everett (4.9%), Kirkland (3.6%), and Bellevue (2.8%); approximately 5 percent of jobs in the city are held by Bothell residents.

In its early decades, Bothell's economy was primarily tied to the logging industry and transitioned into agriculture by the 1920s. The city became a bedroom community in the mid-20th century for commuters to Seattle and later other Eastside cities. Since the 1980s, high tech development in the Canyon Park and North Creek business districts has transformed Bothell into a regional employment center. These areas are home to office parks and warehouses for various industries, primarily in the service and manufacturing sectors. Bothell has several commercial districts that are anchored by supermarket stores or other retailers.

The city had the second-largest biotechnology and biomedical hub in Washington state, behind South Lake Union in Seattle, and has 61 companies that employ 4,000 people. In addition to development facilities, Bothell is home to several major biotechnology wet labs and manufacturers due to its abundance of available space. Biotechnology and biomedical companies headquartered in the city include pharmaceutical manufacturer Seagen (formerly Seattle Genetics), which was acquired by Pfizer in 2023; drug developer and manufacturer AGC Biologics (formerly CMC Biologics); medical imaging equipment manufacturer Fujifilm Sonosite; and drug manufacturer Lundbeck Seattle Biopharmaceuticals. The state's largest biotechnology company, Icos, was headquartered in Bothell until their acquisition by Eli Lilly and Company in 2007.

The city is also home to major facilities for Philips Medical Systems, which manufactures its ultrasound equipment and Sonicare toothbrushes in Bothell at a 57-acre (23 ha) campus that includes a regional sales office. Bothell also has major locations for Lockheed Martin's subsidiary Aculight, which creates laser equipment for medical and defense use; and medical device company Ventec Life Systems, which manufactures ventilators. Immunex opened their Bothell campus, which included the first major pharmaceutical manufacturing plant in the Pacific Northwest, in 1992; the company was later acquired by Amgen in 2002 but the plant remained a major employer in Bothell until it was shut down in 2015.

Other major technology industries in Bothell include information technology and telecommunications. The city's second-largest employer is wireless provider AT&T Mobility, which maintains a backbone network facility and call center in Bothell. Another major cellular service provider, T-Mobile US, is also a major employer in the city and has one of its largest offices in Canyon Park. Two firms associated with the electricity industry, Teltone and Leviton Network Solutions, also have facilities in Bothell. Google opened a Bothell office in 2011 and outsources some of its Google Maps teams to another company in the city. A quantum computing research and development plant in Bothell—the first to be built in the United States—was opened by IonQ in 2024. Microsoft had a Canyon Park campus in the 2000s that housed servers for the company's web services and previously used a building in the area to package its consumer software.

Other companies in the Canyon Park area include Boeing and Panasonic Avionics due to the proximity to aerospace facilities in Everett. A United States Army Reserve facility, the Staff Sgt. Joe R. Hooper Army Reserve Center, is located in the northwest part of the city on Nike Hill. It opened in 1993 and also houses the Region X headquarters of the Federal Emergency Management Agency in an underground facility that was formerly a bunker. Real estate trade magazine publisher Scotsman Guide is based in Bothell. Defunct specialty retailer Pacific Linen was based in the city until 1996.

== Culture ==
The Bothell area is home to a Sikh gurdwara, a regional mosque, and the first consecrated Hindu temple in the Pacific Northwest, which opened in 2014.

=== Arts ===
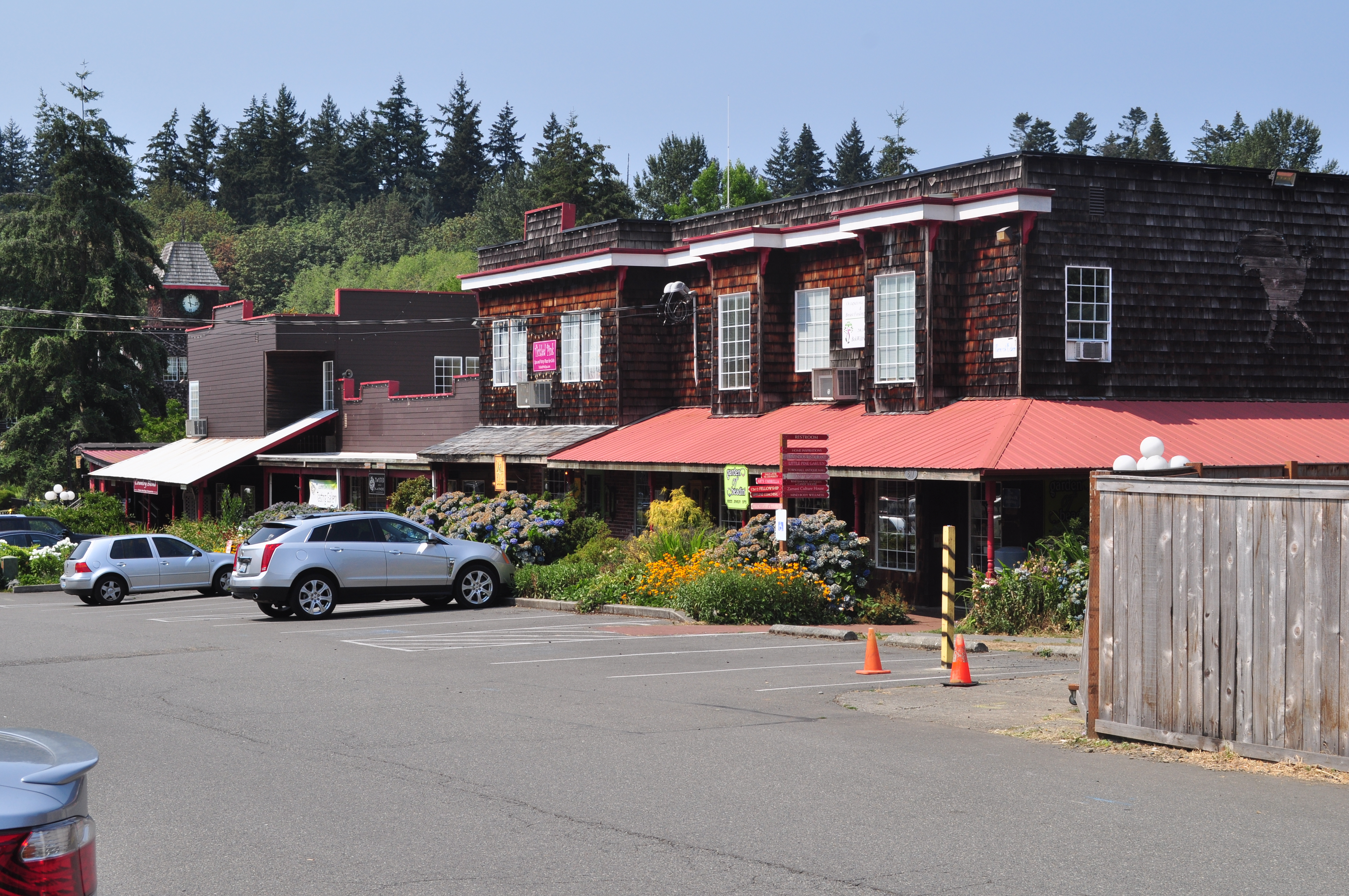
Shops at Country Village, which closed in 2019

Bothell has several pieces of public art, primarily located in downtown or on the University of Washington Bothell and Cascadia College campus. The city government created an arts advisory committee and adopted a percent for art ordinance in 2009 to fund the creation of public artwork and other programs. The committee was replaced by a formal Arts Commission in 2017 with seven members appointed by the city council to manage and promote the public arts program. A gallery at the new city hall is curated by the Arts Commission with room for paintings, sculptures, and on-screen artwork.

The city's downtown is home to an art walk, the Bothell Art Scene, with several participating businesses and art studios. Other pieces of public art in the city include a series of murals on downtown buildings that depict Bothell's history and pioneers. They were first painted in 1989 to honor the city's centennial, but some were lost in the late 1990s to redevelopment.

From 1981 to 2019, Bothell was home to Country Village, a themed shopping center with stores that catered towards the arts community. It had 45 independent businesses in several historic buildings that were repurposed for use by artisan stores, antique shops, and restaurants. Country Village also hosted an annual driftwood sculpture contest and the Museum of Special Art, an art museum for works created by people with disabilities.

The city's largest performing arts venue, the Northshore Performing Arts Center, opened in 2005 at Bothell High School and seats 600 people. It is operated by the Northshore School District and was funded with assistance from a volunteer organization that sought to build a regional theater at a cost of $5 million.

=== Events ===
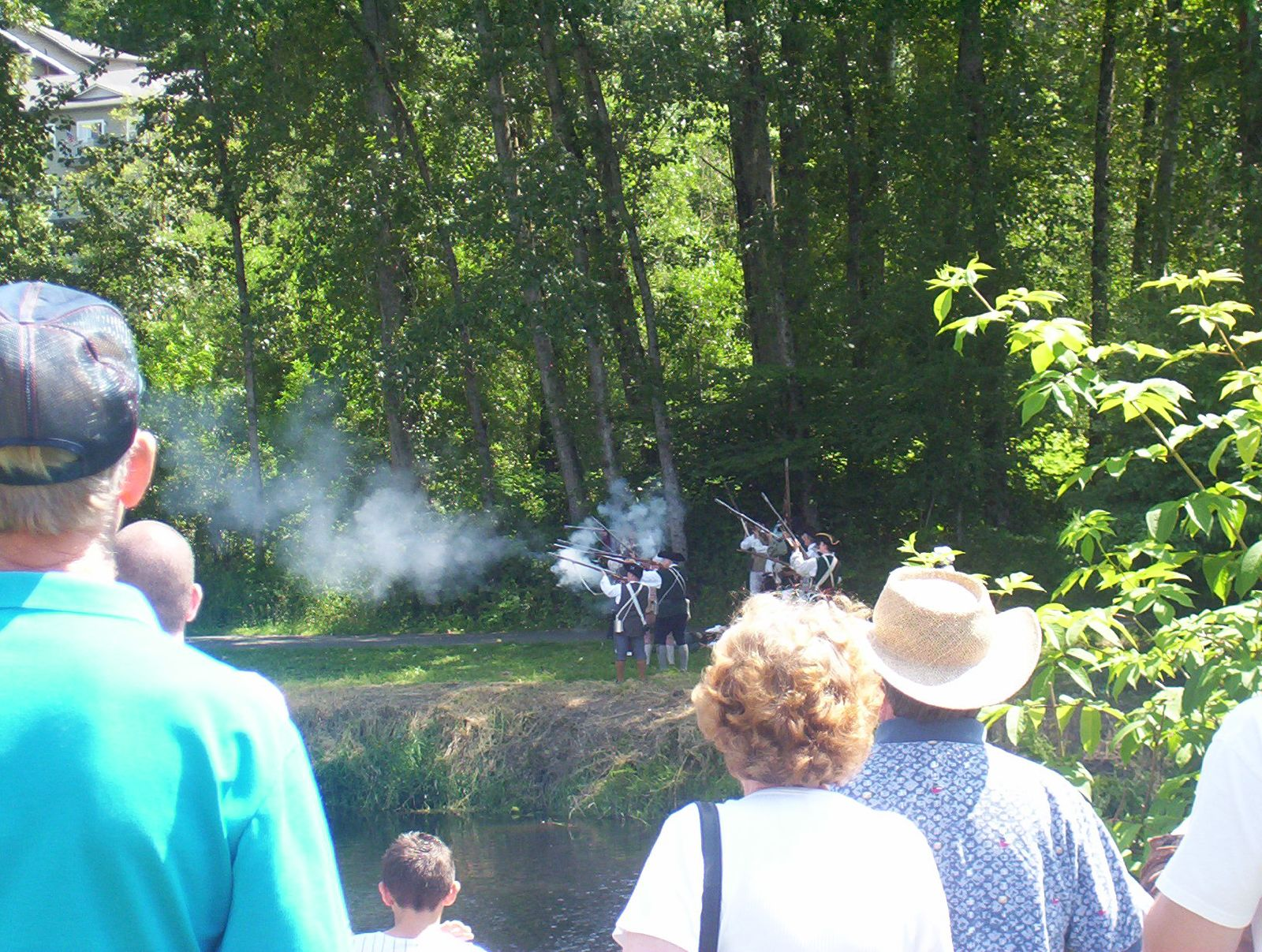
An American Revolutionary War reenactment at Freedom Festival 2005

Bothell hosts several annual events that are funded in part by private donations, sponsorships, and a hotel tax levied by the city government. The city government's Parks Department organizes five annual events, including the Fourth of July parade (also known as the Freedom Festival), which featured a reenactment of the Battles of Lexington and Concord. Other events include an Arbor Day celebration, trick-or-treating on Halloween, and a Winter Porch Light Parade in December. The winter festival also includes the lighting of a Christmas tree; from 1929 to 1979, a 112-foot (34 m) Douglas fir on Main Street was decorated annually by the city. It was recognized as the "largest living Christmas tree in the world" by Life magazine in December 1962; the top of the tree was later removed due to disease and a replacement was planted near the city museum. The parks department also hosts weekly outdoor concerts at the Bothell Landing amphitheater and other activities during the summer months, including night markets on Main Street.

Other events are hosted by community organizations, such as the annual Bothell block party and brewfest sponsored by University of Washington Bothell and the local chamber of commerce. The annual "Sustainamania" has been held in Bothell since 2012 to promote sustainable living, conservation, and education. A weekly community market, named the Bothell Friday Market, launched in 2019 in response to the closure of Country Village, which formerly hosted a farmers' market. An annual bicycle ride, named the Summits of Bothell, was held in the 2000s along a 38-mile (61 km) course in the city with 3,250 feet (990 m) of elevation gain. In 2007, about 5,000 to 7,000 people gathered for a parade and outdoor concert at the Veterans Memorial Amphitheater at Bothell Landing in honor of local American Idol contestant Blake Lewis. The Cup of Kindness Day, created by a local coffeeshop owner and held on May 10, 2018, was cited by Reader's Digest in its awarding of "Nicest Places in America" honors to Bothell and nine other cities that year.

=== Media ===
The Bothell area has one weekly newspaper, the Bothell-Kenmore Reporter, which is owned by Sound Publishing and also serves nearby Kenmore. It was first published in 1933 as the Bothell Citizen and became the Northshore Citizen in 1961 as its coverage grew outside the city's boundaries. The newspaper became a semimonthly publication in January 2002, receiving its current name in the process; the Reporter restored its weekly schedule two months after Sound Publishing acquired the newspaper in November 2006. The first newspapers published in the city included the Bothell Independent from 1903 to 1904 and the Bothell Sentinel from 1908 to 1935.

Bothell is also part of the Seattle–Tacoma media market and is served by Seattle-based media outlets. The region's largest newspaper, The Seattle Times, operated a production facility in the city's North Creek business district from 1992 to 2020, when it closed amid an industry-wide decline in print revenue. The Seattle Post-Intelligencer was also printed at the facility until it shifted to online-only publication in 2009. The Snohomish County side of the city is served by The Everett Herald, a sister paper to the Reporter under the ownership of Sound Publishing. Broadcast-based media outlets that serve the city include television stations KOMO-TV, KING-TV, KIRO-TV, and KCPQ; as well as various radio stations.

=== Library ===
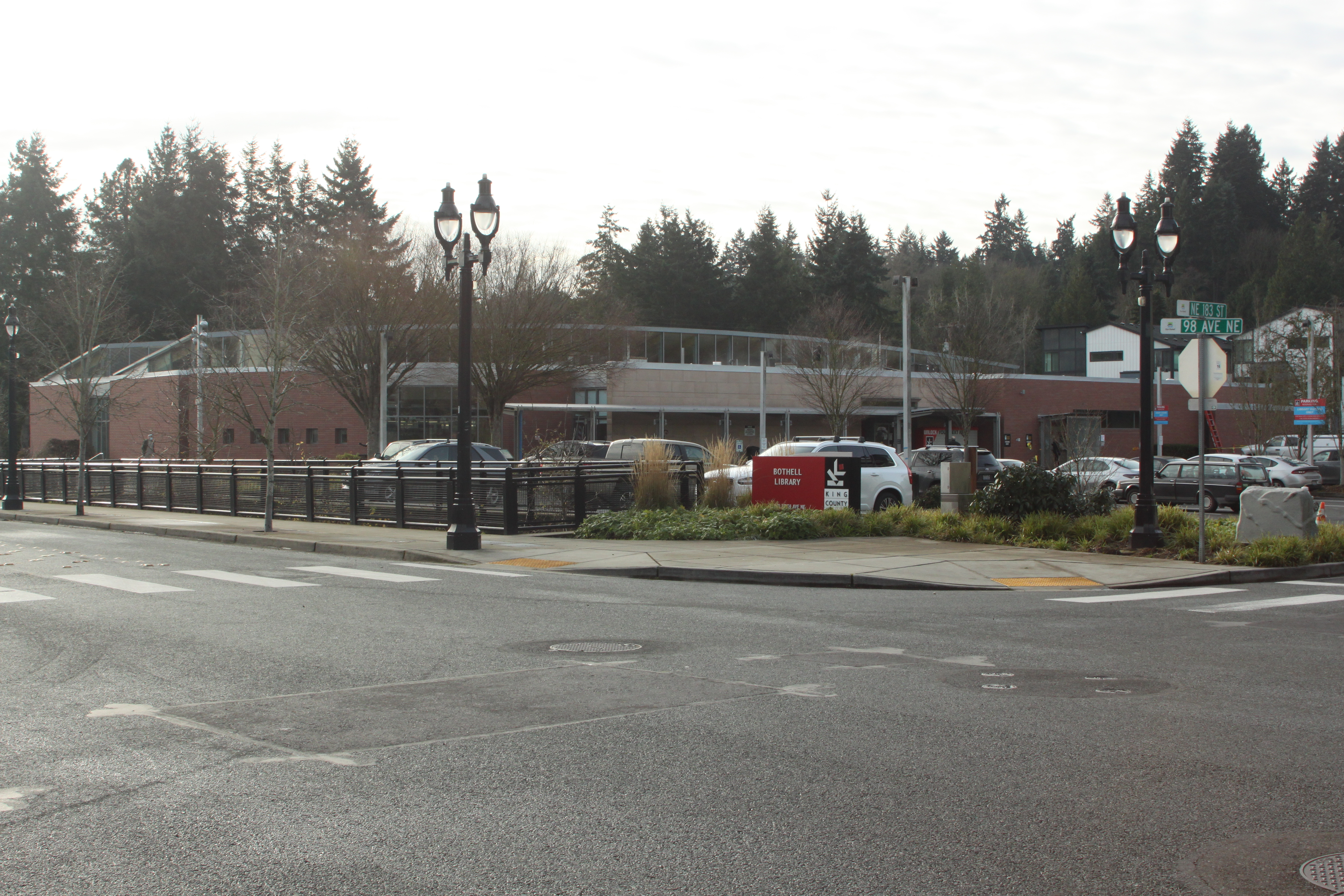
The Bothell public library, operated by the King County Library System

Bothell's public library has been operated by the King County Library System (KCLS) since 1946. The city's first library was established at the Odd Fellows Hall on Main Street in 1905 and was followed by private libraries in local businesses and homes. A public library was established on January 19, 1925, after a fundraising campaign led by local women, at the American Hotel and had 1,000 books. The Bothell city council voted to move the library into the city hall in 1928; the city hall was replaced with a new building in 1936 that included more space for a library.

The city government contracted with KCLS to operate the library, which remained at city hall, beginning in 1946. A $280,000 bond issue was approved by voters in 1967 to construct a separate, 8,300-square-foot (770 m^{2}) building for the library. It was dedicated on July 6, 1969, and held 33,000 books; the library was noted for its natural duck habitat and garden. The Bothell branch was one of the fastest-growing KCLS libraries by the 1980s and a replacement was planned; voters approved full annexation of Bothell into KCLS in November 1986, which was followed two years later by a KCLS bond issue to construct a new library. Initial plans to expand the existing building were scrapped in favor of a new building with 25,000 square feet (2,300 m^{2}) of space to serve as a regional library, to be the largest in North King County at the time. The new Bothell library opened on September 18, 1995, and housed 200,000 books and other materials; the old library was purchased outright by the city government and used for various departments until it was demolished in 2016.

=== Historic preservation ===
Bothell has nine properties that are listed on the National Register of Historic Places (NRHP) due to their cultural, architectural, or historic qualities. Several properties are surviving homes from early city pioneers built in the late 19th and early 20th centuries that were later moved to the Park at Bothell Landing. Other listed sites include the Bothell Pioneer Cemetery, Bates-Tanner Farm, and North Creek School at Centennial Park.

In 1987, the city government established its own local register of historic places, which is managed by the Landmark Preservation Board appointed by the city council. It has 15 properties that include those on the NRHP and the Washington State Heritage Register, as well as additional sites that are over 50 years old. One site, the Harries House and Water Tower, was delisted following its demolition in 2015 despite plans to protect it from nearby housing development.

The Bothell Historical Museum, a non-profit museum run by the local historical society, is located within the Hannan House on the grounds of the Park at Bothell Landing. It opened in 1969 and was relocated to the new park in 1978. The museum is open on Sundays from April through October (aside from a two-year hiatus induced by the COVID-19 pandemic); it is furnished with contemporary artifacts from a late 19th-century home and those related to the city's history. The historical society also funded several restoration projects, including work on the Beckstrom Cabin, built in 1883 and moved to the park grounds in 1979.

=== Sports ===
Pop Keeney Stadium in Downtown Bothell was built in 1920 and seats 4,438 spectators. It is primarily used by high school football teams from the Northshore School District, having originally hosted only Bothell High School. The stadium was renamed during renovations in 1953 for Harold "Pop" Keeney, a local high school football coach. Its original stands were replaced in 1968 and the stadium was renovated again in 2010.

== Government and politics ==
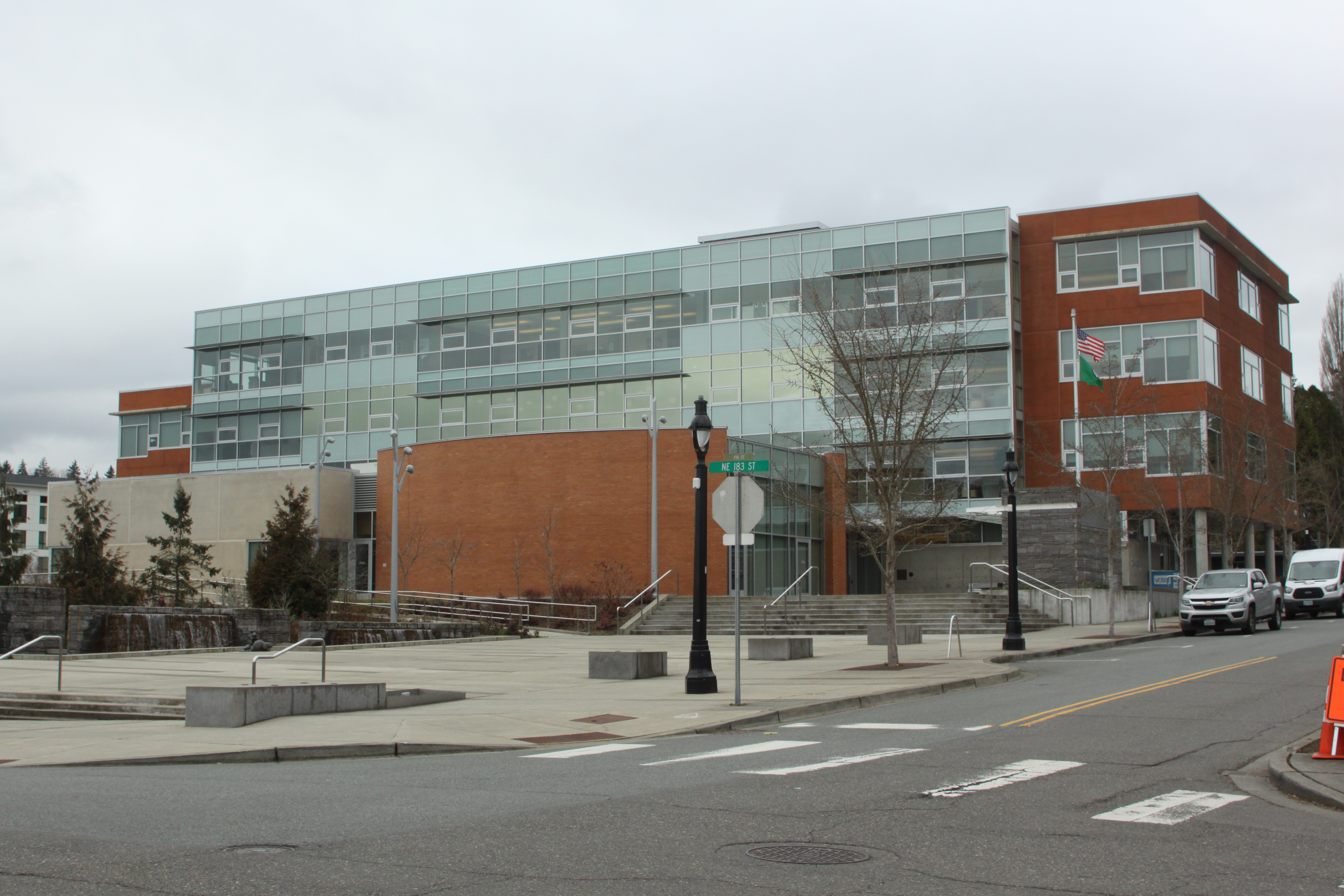
The Bothell City Hall, opened in 2015

Bothell is a non-charter code city with a council–manager government. The city council has seven members elected in non-partisan, at-large positions to four-year terms in staggered election years. The city council passes ordinances and resolutions, approves the budget, sets policies and adjudicates issues. A mayor and deputy mayor are elected to two-year terms by the council from within their own membership. Day-to-day affairs in the city are administered by a city manager, who is hired by the council and appoints the heads of eight departments. Since 2022, the city manager has been Kyle Stannert.

The city government has 387 employees and an operating budget of $266.2 million appropriated for the 2021–22 biennium, sourced primarily from property tax, service charges, and sales tax. It provides a range of municipal services, including police, fire services, emergency medical services, public works, zoning and planning, parks and recreation, and some utilities. The city's fire department has three fire stations and also contracts with Snohomish County Fire Protection District 10 for services north of the county line. A new city hall in Downtown Bothell opened in 2015; it replaced an earlier city hall built in 1938 and five other buildings in the city used by various municipal departments.

At the federal level, Bothell is part of the 1st congressional district, represented by Democrat Suzan DelBene since 2012. At the state level, the city is part of the 1st legislative district alongside Lake Forest Park, Kenmore, Woodinville, and northern Kirkland. Bothell is also represented by three county council districts: King County Council's 1st district covers most of the city's King County side, while a small portion belongs to the 3rd district; the Snohomish County Council's 4th district represents all of the Snohomish County side of the city.

== Parks and recreation ==
Bothell has 26 parks, trails, and open spaces for public use that are maintained by the city government's Parks and Recreation Department. These comprise 403 acres (163 ha) of city-owned open spaces and are supplemented by 1,428 acres (578 ha) in other open spaces and parks owned by county governments and private entities. The Parks and Recreation Department also organizes recreational activities for residents at city parks and facilities, including sport leagues, concerts, yoga, and instructional classes. Bothell is also home to a YMCA branch, senior centers, and other community organizations that provide their own recreational programs.

The Sammamish River corridor has several city parks that are connected to each other by the Sammamish River Trail, a regional hiking and bicycling trail that continues southeast for 10 miles (16 km) to Redmond. The Sammamish River Trail also connects to two other paved regional trails that converge in Bothell: the Burke–Gilman Trail, which runs southwest to Seattle; and the North Creek Trail, which travels to Canyon Park and is planned to reach Mill Creek and Everett in later phases. An unpaved corridor, the Tolt Pipeline Trail, runs southeast from Bothell towards Duvall and follows the route of the Tolt pipeline.

Blyth Park is the city's oldest park, sitting on 40 acres (16 ha) of land facing the river that was donated in 1959 by the local Lions Club. It is adjacent to the former Wayne Golf Course, which was acquired for $3.8 million by the city government between 2017 and 2018 with assistance from Forterra. The 89-acre (36 ha) property is the largest in Bothell's parks system and remains undeveloped except for an existing disc golf course that was retained. Connecting the river and trail to Downtown Bothell is the Park at Bothell Landing, a 14-acre (5.7 ha) park that opened in 1978 with historic buildings and a footbridge. The park's land on the south side of the Sammamish River was acquired from the Washington State Department of Transportation, which had originally planned to build a freeway there to replace State Route 522.

Bothell's largest nature preserve, North Creek Forest, was established in 2011 and sits on 64 acres (26 ha) surrounding North Creek near Interstate 405. It is home to large forests as well as wetlands that host band-tailed pigeons, pileated woodpeckers, and salmon in streams. The forest is managed by a volunteer group and is adjacent to state-owned wetlands on the University of Washington Bothell and Cascadia College campus. The 58-acre (23 ha) wetlands, the largest in the Pacific Northwest to undergo restoration, are home to habitats for deer, goats, coyotes, and other wildlife.

In addition to parks in the downtown area, Bothell has several community parks in its outlying neighborhoods. The Doug Allen Sportsfields, named in 2008 for a former city worker, has several grass fields for soccer and a baseball diamond. The North Creek Sportsfields complex comprises four fields in the North Creek business park designated for soccer, baseball, softball, lacrosse, and American football. The city's northernmost park, Centennial Park, opened in October 2008 at the former site of a Snohomish County park in Thrasher's Corner.

== Education ==
The Northshore School District serves the cities of Bothell, Woodinville, Kenmore, and surrounding unincorporated areas in King and Snohomish counties. It is the 10th-largest school district in Washington state, with 35 schools—of which 12 are within Bothell city limits. The district is governed by a five-member school board elected from geographic districts, of which three include portions of Bothell. Bothell originally formed its own school district in 1885, with the latter expanding its service into surrounding areas throughout the early 20th century until it was merged with its Woodinville counterpart to form Northshore in 1959.

The 12 public schools in Bothell comprise one high school, three middle schools, and eight elementary schools. Bothell High School opened in 1907 to serve several rural school districts and moved between several buildings until its current West Hill campus was completed in 1953. The campus underwent an extensive renovation that was completed in 2008 that added classrooms, common areas, and a performing arts center. Two of the district's other high schools, Inglemoor in Kenmore and North Creek in unincorporated Snohomish County, also serve Bothell residents.

The Bothell area is also home to several private schools, including those affiliated with local churches. Among them are campuses of the Cedar Park Christian School system, including a high school in Bothell; the Providence Classical Christian School, a K–12 school founded in 1997; and St. Brendan's Catholic School, founded in 1966 and administered by the Archdiocese of Seattle. The Clearwater School, a Sudbury school with student-controlled learning; two Montessori schools; the Evergreen Academy; and the Washington Preparatory School are also located in and around Bothell.

=== Higher education ===
Bothell is home to two post-secondary educational institutions, Cascadia College and the University of Washington Bothell (UW Bothell), which share a single campus east of downtown near Interstate 405 and State Route 522. UW Bothell is one of three campuses of the University of Washington and serves 6,000 students as of 2019, of which approximately 30 percent reside in Snohomish County. Cascadia College, a two-year community college, had fewer than 3,000 enrolled students in 2019.

UW Bothell was established by the state government in 1989 alongside another branch campus in Tacoma to serve students who had graduated from two-year community colleges. Its first classes were held in October 1990 at a Canyon Park office building. At the same time, the state government approved plans to establish another community college on the Eastside to relieve overcrowding at colleges in Bellevue and Shoreline. The state government proposed replacing UW Bothell and the planned community college with a new four-year university in 1992, but opted instead to have both institutions share space on the intended site for the latter; the shared campus opened in September 2000. Further attempts to merge the institutions were rejected by students and the state government, who instead authorized an expansion of UW Bothell from an upper division school to a four-year institution beginning in 2006.

== Infrastructure ==
=== Transportation ===
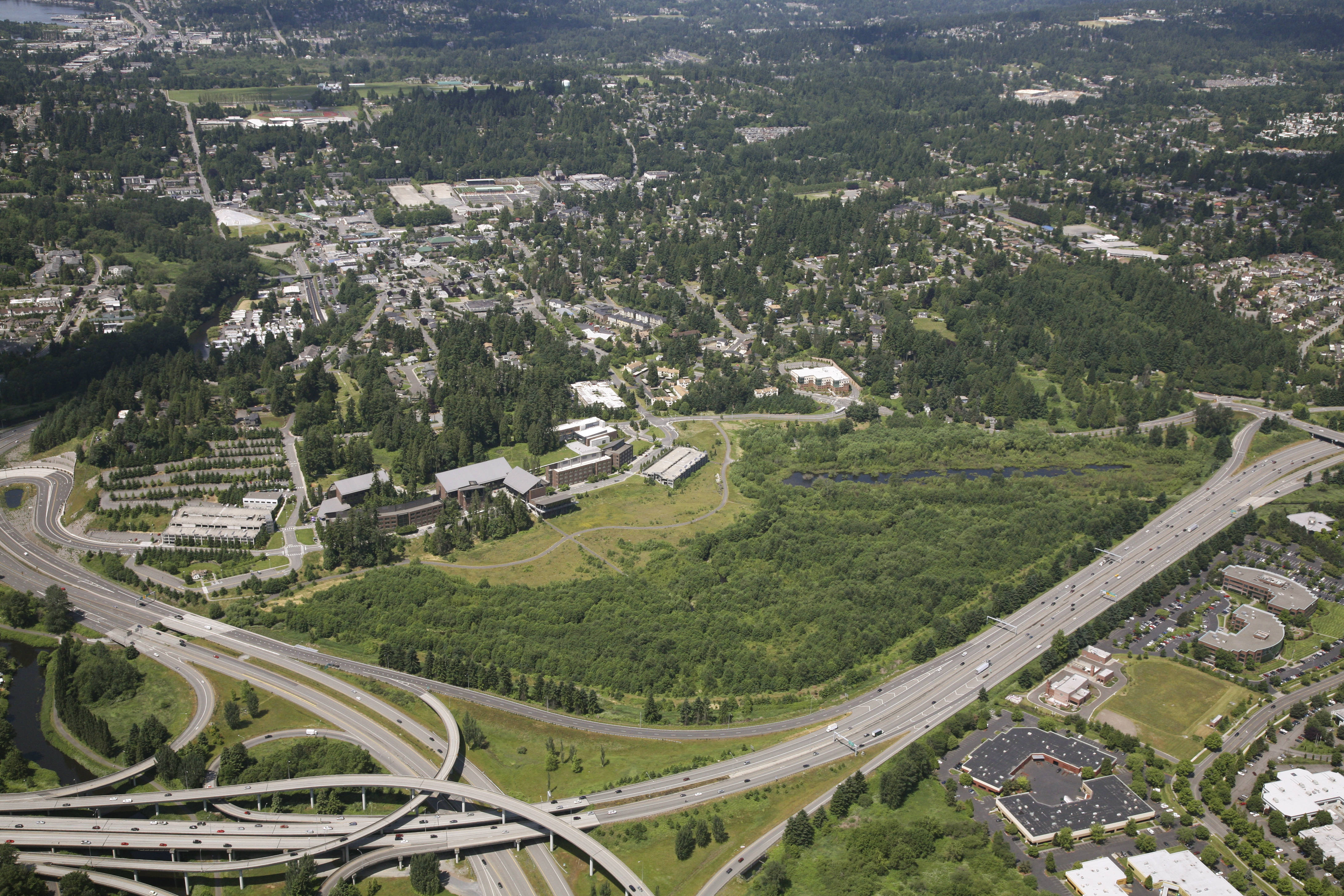
Aerial view of the Interstate 405 and State Route 522 interchange near the University of Washington Bothell campus

Bothell lies at the intersection of Interstate 405, a major freeway bypass of Seattle, and State Route 522, which provides connections to Seattle and Monroe. Other highways in the city's northern neighborhoods include State Route 524, which travels west to Lynnwood and east to Maltby; and State Route 527 (the Bothell–Everett Highway), which connects Bothell to Mill Creek and Everett. Prior to the opening of the new Pacific Highway between Everett and Seattle in 1927, U.S. Route 99 was routed through Bothell on modern-day State Route 522 and State Route 527.

Public transportation within the city is provided by several operators that serve hubs at the University of Washington Bothell campus, Canyon Park Park and Ride on Interstate 405, and Downtown Bothell. King County Metro has local routes connecting Bothell to nearby cities, as well as express routes traveling to North Seattle and the main University of Washington campus. Sound Transit Express operates express routes from Bothell to Shoreline South/148th station via State Route 522 and along Interstate 405 to Lynnwood and Downtown Bellevue. Community Transit primarily serves Snohomish County with connections at its Canyon Park hub that is also the terminus of the Swift Green Line, a bus rapid transit line on State Route 527 that debuted in 2019. The agency's routes connect Bothell to Lynnwood, Mill Creek, and Everett. These agencies, along with the Washington State Department of Transportation, also operate park-and-ride lots that have a total capacity of 965 vehicles.

As part of the Sound Transit 3 program, two Stride bus rapid transit lines are planned to be built through Bothell by 2029. The S2 Line will follow Interstate 405 between Lynnwood and Bellevue with stops at the University of Washington Bothell campus and Canyon Park when it opens in 2029; the S3 Line on State Route 522 between Shoreline South/148th station in Shoreline and Bothell will open in 2028 with stations in Downtown Bothell and at the University of Washington Bothell campus. An extension of the Swift Green Line from Canyon Park to Downtown Bothell and the UW Bothell campus is planned to open by 2031.

In July 2019, the city government launched its dockless electric scooter sharing program with Lime.

=== Utilities ===
The delivery of electric power to residents, businesses, and buildings in Bothell is split between two providers serving different sides of the King–Snohomish county line. The Snohomish County Public Utility District provides electricity for the Snohomish County side of Bothell, along with the rest of the county; Puget Sound Energy provides electricity for the King County side and natural gas service for all of Bothell. The Bothell city government contracts with Recology for all curbside garbage, recycling, and yard waste collection and disposal. The company also has a store in Canyon Park that sells products made from recycled materials and accepts hazardous materials for recycling. Waste Management handles garbage and recycling collection outside of city limits and was also responsible for some annexed areas of Bothell until 2021.

Bothell has four water districts that provide tap water service within its city limits: the Alderwood Water and Wastewater District serving Canyon Park and the northern neighborhoods; the Bothell Water District serving Downtown Bothell and nearby neighborhoods; the Northshore Utility District serving western and southern Bothell; and the Woodinville Water District serving a small area in the city's southeastern outskirts. Alderwood sources its water from Spada Lake in Snohomish County through the City of Everett; the other three districts purchase their water from Seattle Public Utilities, which sources its supply from the Tolt River watershed in King County. The water districts also manage the wastewater and sewage systems for their respective service areas, which are pumped to the Brightwater sewage treatment plant near Woodinville for treatment. The city government is also responsible for stormwater collection and treatment using a 138-mile (222 km) system of storm pipes that flow into catchment ponds and detention vaults.

=== Healthcare ===
The city's nearest general hospital is EvergreenHealth Kirkland, a Level III trauma center located in the Totem Lake neighborhood of Kirkland. The King County portion of Bothell is part of the public hospital district that manages EvergreenHealth and elects one member to its board of commissioners. The northwestern outskirts of the city in Snohomish County are part of the Verdant Health Commission (Snohomish County Public Hospital District No. 2), which formerly operated Stevens Hospital (now Swedish Health Services Edmonds). Bothell is home to several small community and urgent care clinics operated by regional healthcare providers, including The Everett Clinic, HealthPoint, Indigo Health, Pacific Medical Centers, and ZoomCare. A clinic run by Public Health – Seattle & King County in southern Bothell served over 4,200 annual clients until its closure in 2014.

== Notable people ==
- James Allsup, far-right political commentator
- Bryan Alvarez, professional wrestler and radio host
- Bernadette Bascom, singer
- Ross Bowers, American football player
- Karan Brar, actor
- Kyle Cease, comedian and actor
- Michael Dahlquist, musician
- Robert DeLong, electronic musician
- Maxine Dexter, Oregon state representative; 2024 congressional candidate
- Michael Dong, slalom skateboarder
- Micah Downs, basketball player
- Jeanne Edwards, state representative and city council member
- Korel Engin, basketball player
- Bud Ericksen, American football player and former mayor
- Sterling Flunder, soccer player
- Brenden Foster, terminal leukemia patient and activist
- Dorothy Awes Haaland, Alaskan politician
- Phil Harris, fisherman and reality TV star
- Johnny Hekker, American football player
- Shiloh Keo, American football player
- Zach LaVine, basketball player
- Blake Lewis, singer and American Idol 2007 runner-up
- Rosemary McAuliffe, state politician
- Sharon McMurtry, soccer player
- Patty Murray, U.S. senator, president pro tempore of the United States Senate
- Arnold Riegger, trap shooter and Olympian
- Tracie Ruiz-Conforto, synchronized swimmer and Olympic medalist
- Ernie Steele, American football player
- Hal Sutherland, animator and painter
- Wayne Suttles, anthropologist and linguist
- Cody Votolato, musician for The Blood Brothers
- Chris Walla, musician for Death Cab for Cutie
- Doug Yule, musician

== Sister city ==
Bothell has one sister city, Koganei in Tokyo, Japan. Their relationship was formalized in 1991 and has included annual student exchanges.
