= Tolt =

Tolt may refer to:

- Tölt, a four-beat lateral ambling gait mainly found in Icelandic horses
- Tolt River, located in the western foothills of the Cascade Mountains, United States
- Tolt, a former name of Carnation, Washington

== See also ==
- Tolt pipeline, located in Washington state, United States
  - Tolt Pipeline Trail
