= Ethnic Renewal in Philadelphia's Chinatown =

2015 book by Kathryn Elizabeth Wilson

Ethnic Renewal in Philadelphia’s Chinatown: Space, Place, and Struggle is a 2015 academic book by Kathryn Elizabeth Wilson, published by Temple University Press. It includes the history of Chinatown, Philadelphia.

The book documents community resistance against urban renewal plans to destroy parts of Chinatown.

Alyssa Ribeiro of Allegheny College wrote that the book highlights how people in the neighborhood kept it alive in a carefully-done manner.

== Content ==
The book's scope begins with the latter part of the 1800s. The first two chapters cover that period to the 1940s, while the following four were about attempts to stop razing portions of the neighborhood in subsequent eras.

Ribeiro wrote that the book had more focus on the period circa 1971–2016.

== Reception ==
Flemming Christiansen of University of Duisburg-Essen stated that the book is "superbly written", and that the sections regarding anti-bulldozing efforts were the highest quality portion of the book. Christiansen argued that the book could have shown how Chinatown had also incorporated groups of people not of Asian origin.

Scott Kurashige of the University of Washington Bothell wrote that the work successfully shows the point of view of Chinatown residents even though Wilson does not present herself as having an "insider's account". Kurashige also praised how the book shows that pro-Chinatown activists sometimes had different beliefs on what should happen to Chinatown.
