= North Creek Trail =

Trail in Washington state, USA

The North Creek Trail is a regional multipurpose trail that runs from Bothell to Mill Creek in Washington state. Portions of the trail are still being developed. The trail's southern terminus connects with the Sammamish River Trail at the UW Bothell and Cascadia College campus.

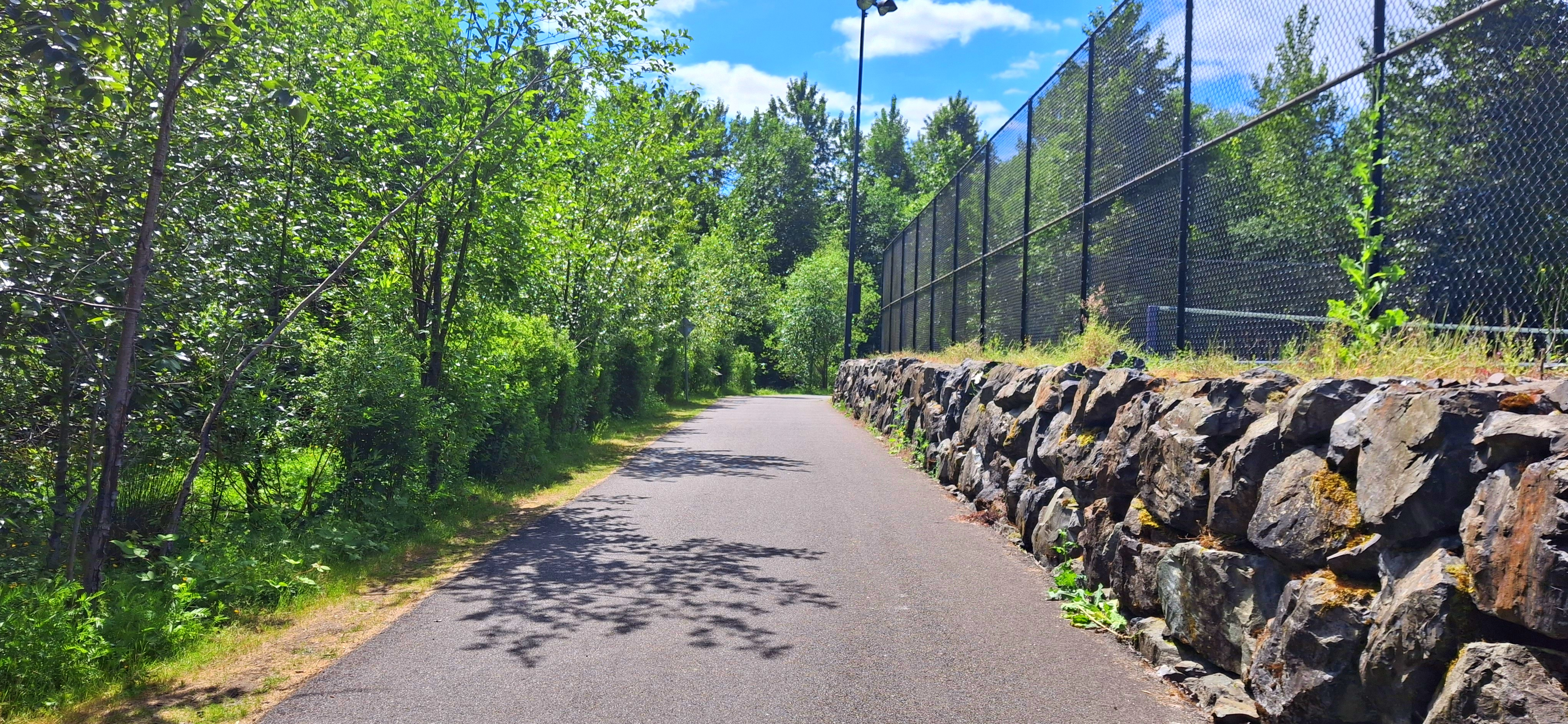
The North creek trail in Bothell
