= Pacific Linen =

- Type: Public
- Industry: Retail
- Founded: Seattle, Washington, United States (1980)
- Defunct: 1996
- Fate: Liquidation
- Headquarters: Woodinville, Washington, United States
- Number of locations: 28 (1999)
- Area served: Washington, Idaho, Oregon, Utah, Alaska, British Columbia, Alberta, Saskatchewan, Ontario, and Manitoba (1999)

Pacific Linen, founded 1980 in Seattle, Washington, is a defunct retailer of high quality designer linens, bath towels, and home accents that operated in the United States and Canada.

== History ==
In April 1996, Pacific Linen filed for Chapter 11 bankruptcy protection. In an attempt to cut costs, the company closed several stores and moved its headquarters from Bothell to Woodinville-Redmond Road in Woodinville. By 1999, the company was operating its core locations in Canada with only nine American stores remaining.

== Liquidation ==
In September 1999, Pacific Linen announced to its employees that the company had hired Universal Capital Group to liquidate its 28 remaining stores in the United States and Canada. Century Services worked in conjunction with Universal Capital to liquidate the Canadian division.

== See also ==
- Linen tester
- Marghab Linens
