= North Creek Forest =

Protected area in Bothell, Washington, U.S.

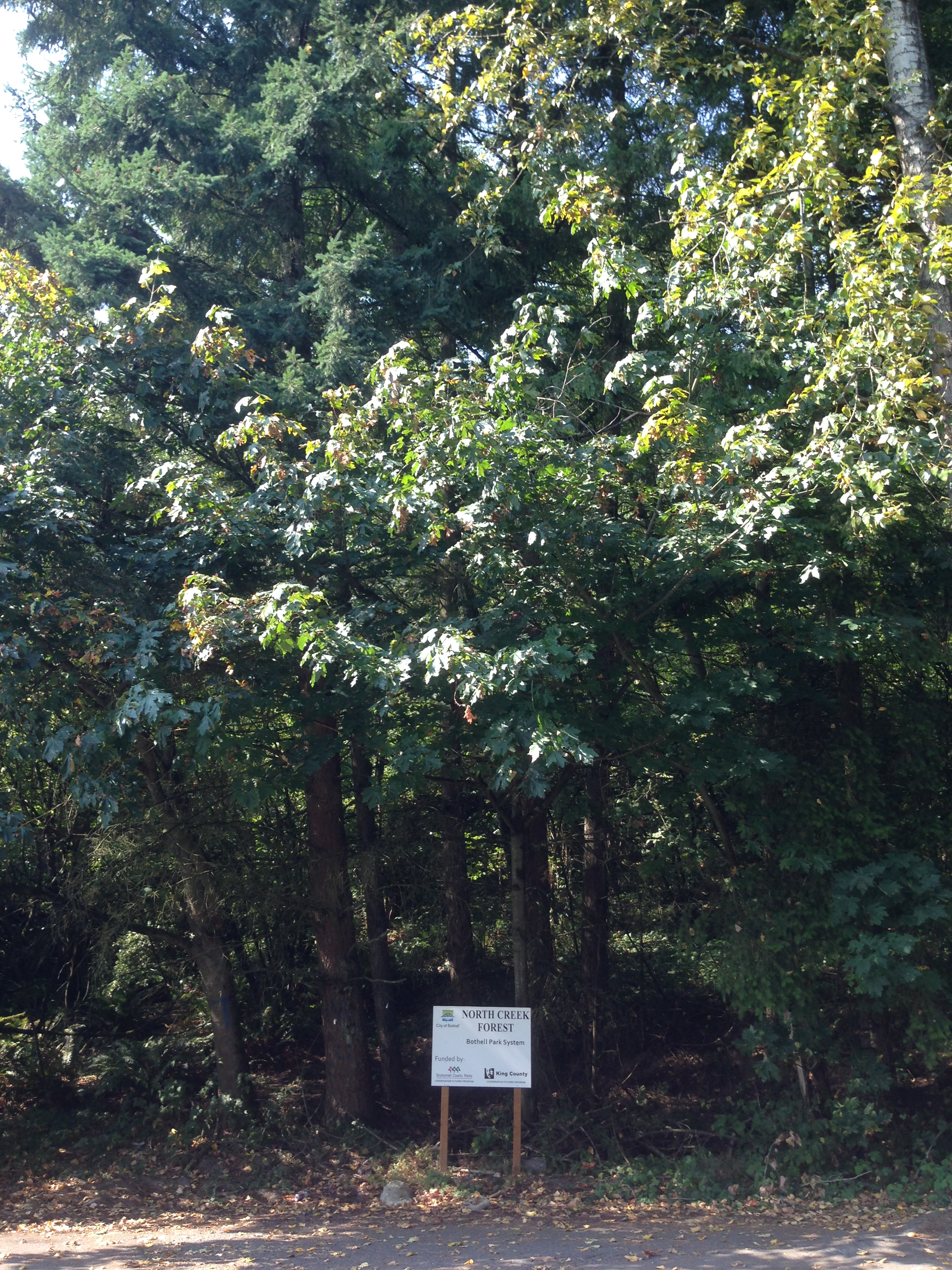
- North Creek Forest in Bothell, WA
- Interactive map of North Creek Forest
- Location: Bothell, Washington
- Nearest city: Seattle
- Coordinates: 47°46′39″N 122°11′40″W
- Area: 64 acres (26 ha)
- Designation: Priority Habitat
- Established: December 2011

The North Creek Forest is located in Bothell, Washington and surrounds a section of the 12.6-mile (20.3 km) North Creek and encompasses 64 acres of mature second growth mixed coniferous/hardwood forest with 7 streams and 9 wetlands. The forest forms a one mile long and up to 1/3- mile wide habitat corridor extending from Canyon Park Junior High School in the north almost to the North Creek wetlands near the University of Washington Bothell Campus, and eventually links to the Sammamish River in the south. The North Creek Forest is one of the last remaining mature coniferous forests in the Bothell area. The forest here filters and cools water in streams, wetlands and countless small springs and seeps, along an entire mile of watershed. The cooling of this water is crucial for 5 species of anadromous fish that spawn in North Creek including chum, coho, sockeye, chinook and steelhead. Many other ecosystem services are provided by this forest including carbon sequestration, reduction of surface runoff and cooling of ambient temperatures in surrounding neighborhood.

The dominant tree species of North Creek Forest are Pseudotsuga menziesii (Douglas-fir), Thuja plicata (western redcedar), Tsuga heterophylla (western hemlock), Taxus brevifolia (western yew), Abies grandis (grand fir), Acer macrophyllum (big-leaf maple), Frangula purshiana (cascara), Alnus rubra (red alder) and Cornus sericea (red osier dogwood). The most common current vegetation community type is western red cedar - Douglas-fir/big leaf maple (THPL-PSME/ACMA). This forest is home to countless species of wildlife such as black-tailed deer, Douglas squirrel, mountain beaver, barred owl, western screech owl, great horned owl, coopers hawk, merlin, pileated woodpecker, and the pacific tree frog.

Urban development has long been the main threat to the forest but, Invasive species takeover is now the major threat to this riparian forest. The most prevalent invasive species in the forest are Rubis bifrons (Himalayan blackberry), Hedera helix (English ivy) and Phalaris arundinacea (reed canary grass). Invasive plant species are known to have adverse effects on native vegetation by using up limited resources in the area like water, space and sunlight. In addition invasive plants can halt a forest in early stages of ecological succession.

An active partnership of restoration and conservation in the North Creek Forest serves to prevent net losses of wetlands, net changes in function, and positive gains in biodiversity and habitat quality. This partnership has been in place since 2011 and now includes 5 sites of approximately 1/4 acre each along the edges of the forest. Restoration efforts to the forest have been led by the Friends of North Creek Forest in partnership with the University of Washington's Restoration Ecology Network, offering students the chance for real world application of restoration methods and practices. A protected and restored North Creek Forest provides a healthy forested site along the vital Sammamish river habitat corridor within an urban area of constant disturbance and change.

North Creek Forest is used as an education area for students of all ages. At its highest level it can be a research site for master's or PhD candidates. It is used consistently as a site in the University of Washington restoration ecology network and as a living classroom for many courses at University of Washington Bothell. Many other schools from elementary level and up visit here for educational purposes.

In November 2015, the City of Bothell received a Bravo Award, a grant from the Washington State Recreation and Conservation Funding Board, for its efforts to conserve the forest. The grant helped enable Bothell to secure the funding to purchase the final 22 acres needed to complete the 64 acre North Creek Forest. After securing additional funding, On November 8, 2016, the Bothell City Council authorized the purchase of the final tract needed to preserve the whole of the forest.
