= Ventec Life Systems =

American medical device company

- Industry: Medical devices
- Founded: 1 January 2012
- Founder: Doug DeVries
- Headquarters: Bothell, Washington
- Key people: Jim Alwan (Chief executive officer); Chris Brooks (Chief strategy officer); Doug DeVries (Chief technology officer)
- Products: VOCSN
- Website: www.venteclife.com

Ventec Life Systems is an American medical device company based in Bothell, Washington.

== History ==
Ventec Life Systems was founded in Bothell, Washington, a suburb of Seattle, by Doug DeVries. According to the New York Times, Ventec is known for its VOCSN model, which received approval from the Food and Drug Administration in 2017. The VOCSN is the size of a large toaster oven, and combines a number of functions that had previously been performed by several machines to pump air into the lungs, suction out secretions, and produce oxygen when a central oxygen line is not available. It is used in critical-care hospital units and in home care. DeVries was inspired to develop the VOCSN model after his father was diagnosed with ALS. Jim Alwan is the CEO and Chris Brooks is the Chief Strategy Officer.

== VOCSN ==
Ventec developed the VOCSN unified respiratory system, which is a portable personal medical device that includes a ventilator, 6 L/min portable oxygen concentrator, cough assist, suction, and nebulization therapies for the patient. The name of the device is an acronym derived from the names of these five functions. It received FDA approval in April 2017 and began to roll out in 2018. The device weighs about 18 pounds. It is designed for use by both children and adults to treat conditions such as muscular degeneration, spinal cord injury, and underdeveloped lungs. As of 2017, it was medically cleared for use in the US and Japan. According to NBC News, its ventilators are transportable and include advanced data monitoring, as well as internal controls to make the most of oxygen consumption. The five-in-one technology compresses 55 pounds of equipment into 18 pounds, and it has a nine-hour battery life.

=== COVID-19 support ===
On March 21, 2020, during the COVID-19 pandemic, General Motors announced a partnership with Ventec to produce ventilators. The partnership was expected to build 10,000 ventilators per month at GM's facilities in Kokomo, Indiana, using Ventec's VOCSN platform. Ventec is one of 12 worldwide manufacturers of ventilators. The partnership between Ventec and GM quickly received a $489 million contract to deliver 30,000 VOCSN Critical Care Ventilators to the U.S. Department of Health and Human Services. The first critical care ventilators were delivered to medical professionals that month, producing one ventilator every seven minutes in an effort the New Yorker called a "fighter jet in a race with prop planes". Fast Company named the partnership one of "Top 10 Most Innovative Joint Ventures" in 2020.
