= Gareth Roe =

Gareth Roe (born 1963/1964) is a professional slalom skateboarder, skateboard designer and manufacturer from Seattle, Washington.

Roe began skateboarding in 1974, and began winning competitions in 1977, when he placed first in the Washington state Coca-Cola Skate Board Olympics. He took second place in the Tight Slalom at the 2005 World Championships of Slalom Skateboarding.

His interest in skateboarding led him to establish RoeRacing (2001), which manufactured slalom skateboards. His company sponsors the RoeRacing Slalom Skateboard Team, which includes Michael Dong, the 2003, 2004, and 2005 World Cyber Slalom Champion and Judi Oyama Women's Slalom World Champion in 2003 and number one Women's Masters Slalom Champion for 2005 and 2006.
