= Michael Dong =

Michael Dong is a champion professional slalom skateboarder from Bothell, Washington, United States. Dong was ranked #5 in the world in 2005 and holds the 2003, 2004, and 2005 World Cyber Slalom titles.

Dong began skateboarding in 1975. Early skating highlights include: 1979 Capitol Lakefair Skateboard Contest, Olympia, Washington, 14-year-old age group: 1st pool riding, 1st freestyle, 1st cross-country. In 2002, Dong re-entered competitive skateboarding after a 22-year absence, competing in the San Francisco Battle by the Bay. He quickly moved from the amateur ranks to professional. In 2003, he was ranked #5 in the world in slalom skateboarding, maintaining the #5 ranking in 2004 and 2005. He has established himself as the #1 cyber slalom skateboarder in the world. Dong is a member of the RoeRacing Slalom Skateboard Team.

== 2005 Results ==
- Slalom Week 2005 World Championships (Morro Bay, California) – 17 September 2005
  - Tight Slalom – 3rd Place
  - Slalom – 4th Place
- European Championships (Stockholm, Sweden) – July 15, 2005: Cyber Slalom Cup – 1st Place
- 3dm Seismic West Coast Championships (Hood River, Oregon) – Tight Slalom – 1st Place – 9 July 2005
- “Bro, Your Dad’s a Martian” (Bush's Pasture Park Soap Box Derby Hill, Salem, Oregon) – Tight Slalom (dual lane) – 1st Place – 19 June 2005
- Paris World Cup (Paris, France) – May 14, 2005: Tight Straight Slalom – 2nd Place
- Red Clay Cup (Athens, Georgia) – Slalom – 3rd Place – 30 April 2005

== Cyber Slalom ==
As of 2026, Dong still held the world record for the Cyber Slalom, with a time of 7.96sec, set in Beaverton, Oregon in September 2008.
