= Scotsman Guide =

United States mortgage industry magazines

Scotsman Guide is the name of two United States trade/B2B magazines published monthly by Scotsman Guide Media in Bothell, Washington. One magazine is geared to U.S. residential mortgage originators, and one is geared to U.S. commercial mortgage originators.

== History and profile ==
The Scotsman Guide was founded in 1985. It publishes an annual ranking of the top mortgage originators in the U.S. The rankings are broken out by volume of loans and types of mortgage - for example, top lenders of Federal Housing Authority-backed loans. Mortgage lenders are invited to submit performance data to Scotsman Guide. Scotsman Guide staff audit each submission to ensure accuracy.

In mid-2014, Scotsman Guide launched a news service to offer original news reporting on the housing market, commercial lending and construction, government regulations, and other pertinent industry topics.

Neither publication is related to The Scotsman newspaper and The Scotsman Publications Ltd.

== Awards ==
In 2007, Scotsman Guide won the Maggie award of the Western Publications Association for Best Single Editorial Illustration/Trade.

In 2006 and 2007, it received a Bronze Medal from the American Society of Business Publication Editors for their Wholesale Mortgage Lenders Search database.
