= Forterra =

Land conservation, stewardship and community building organization in Seattle, USA

- Type: Nonprofit
- Purpose: Environmental stewardship
- Coordinates: 47.605935°N 122.331783°W
- Region served: Washington State
- Website: Official website
- Formerly called: Cascade Land Conservancy

Forterra (formerly known as Cascade Land Conservancy), based in Seattle, Washington, US, is the state of Washington's largest land conservation, stewardship and community building organization dedicated solely to the region.

Currently, Forterra operates in multiple counties. Principal offices are in Seattle, Roslyn, and Tacoma.

== Accomplishments ==
Forterra has conserved 275,000 acres (1,110 km^{2}) of working farms, forestlands and natural areas to date. Some of the major conservation projects include 118-acre (0.48 km^{2}) Saddle Swamp, 300-acre (1.2 km^{2}) Maury Island Marine Park and 90,000-acre (360 km^{2}) Snoqualmie Tree Farm.

In December 2016, Forterra acquired 376 acres (152 ha) of forest near the North and Middle Forks of the Snoqualmie River, jointly with Washington’s Department of Natural Resources.

== Scandal ==
In October 2022 Forterra fired Director of Real Estate Transactions Tobias Levey citing "concerns that he could not responsibly or effectively serve the organization’s mission.” Levey settled a civil lawsuit in 2017 that wrought allegations of fraud and embezzlement in a land deal similar to the projects he'd overseen at Forterra. This firing followed accusations by Snoqualmie Tribe officials that Forterra had misled tribal leaders in an application for 20 million dollar grant with the USDA. The tribe claims included allegations that the Forterra leadership refused to provide the grant unless tribal leadership agreed to sign a non-disclosure agreement.

== Green Cities ==
Forterra has official partnerships with the cities of Everett, Kent, Kirkland, Redmond, Seattle, and Tacoma in leading stewardship projects at city parks and urban forests. Public volunteers and volunteer Forest Stewards work with cities and Cascade Land Conservancy in implementing 20 year plans to protect urban forests from invasive plants.

On November 2, 2011, Cascade Land Conservancy officially changed the organization's name to 'Forterra' (meaning 'for the earth') in order to reflect the organization's changing goals. As Washington State's largest conservation and stewardship organization, the 'Cascade' in the name did not reflect the statewide work area. 'Land Conservancy' likewise no longer embodied the purpose of the organization.

== Green Seattle Partnership ==
The Green Seattle Partnership is a partnership between the City of Seattle and Forterra with the goal of combating invasive species and preserving parklands in Seattle, Washington.
