= Tolt Pipeline Trail =

Equestrian and biking trail in Washington, USA and Canada

Coordinates: 47°44′11″N 122°08′55″W

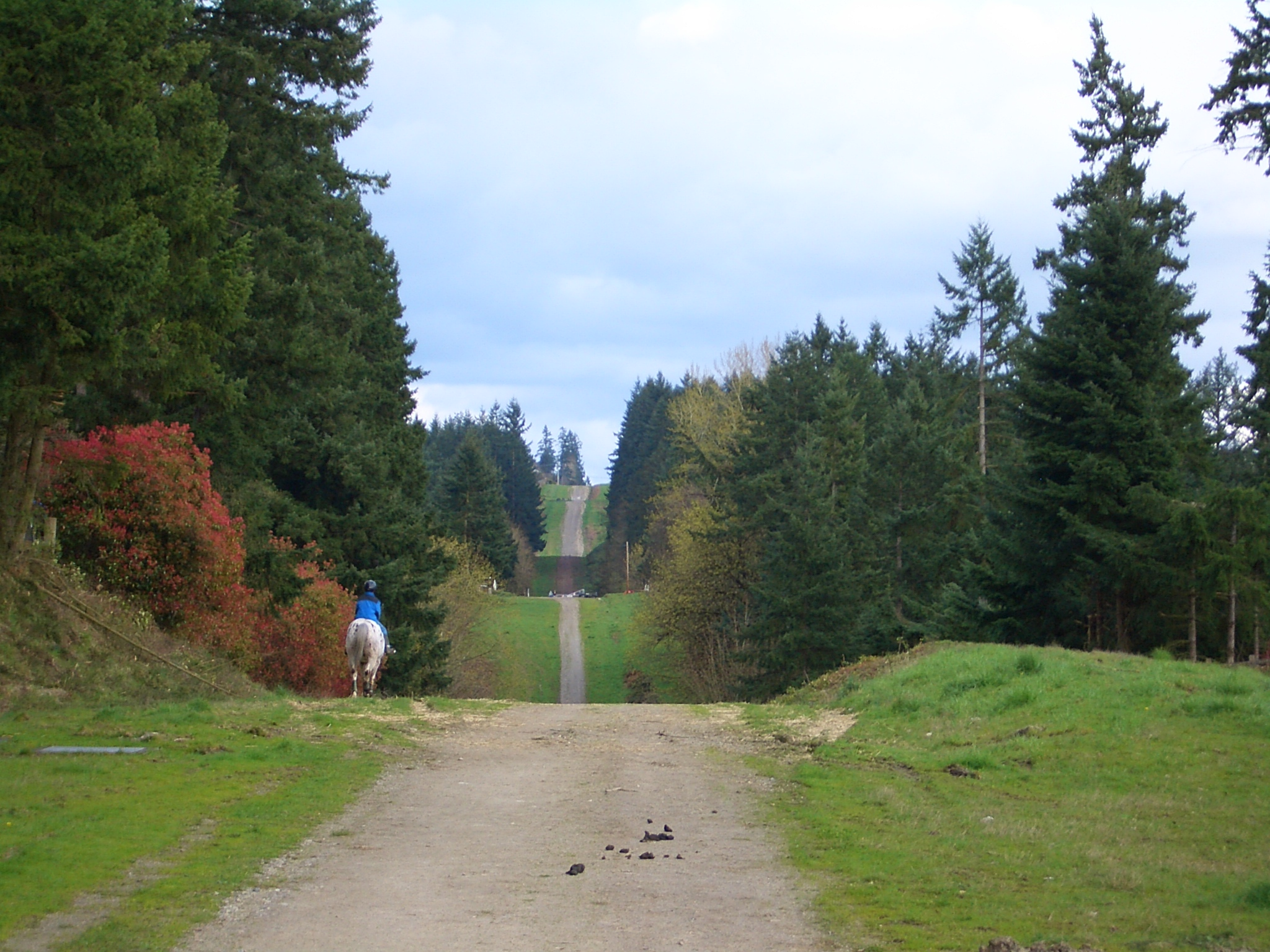
On the trail

The Tolt Pipeline Trail is a 100 foot (30 m) wide, unpaved equestrian, pedestrian and mountain bike trail in Seattle's Eastside suburbs. It stretches 12 miles (19 km) along the Tolt pipeline right-of-way from Bothell, Washington to the Snoqualmie Valley Regional Trail near Duvall.

== See also ==
- List of rail trails
