= Linen tester =

Magnifying device

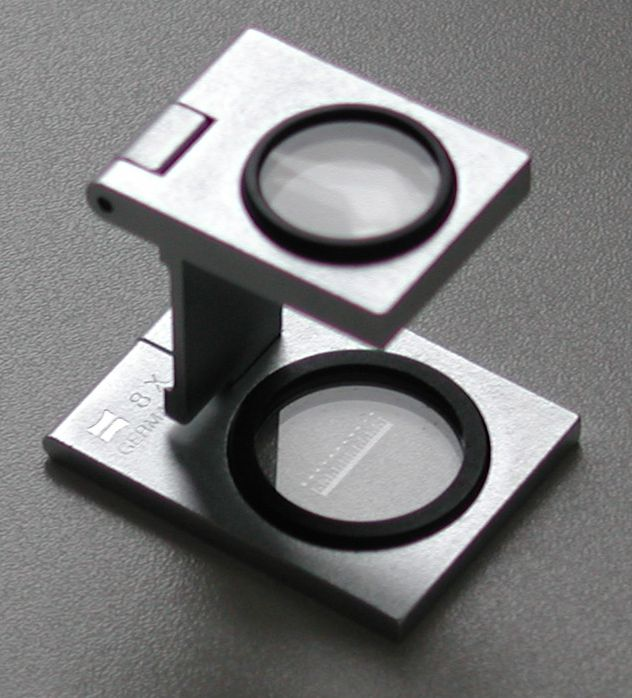
Linen tester

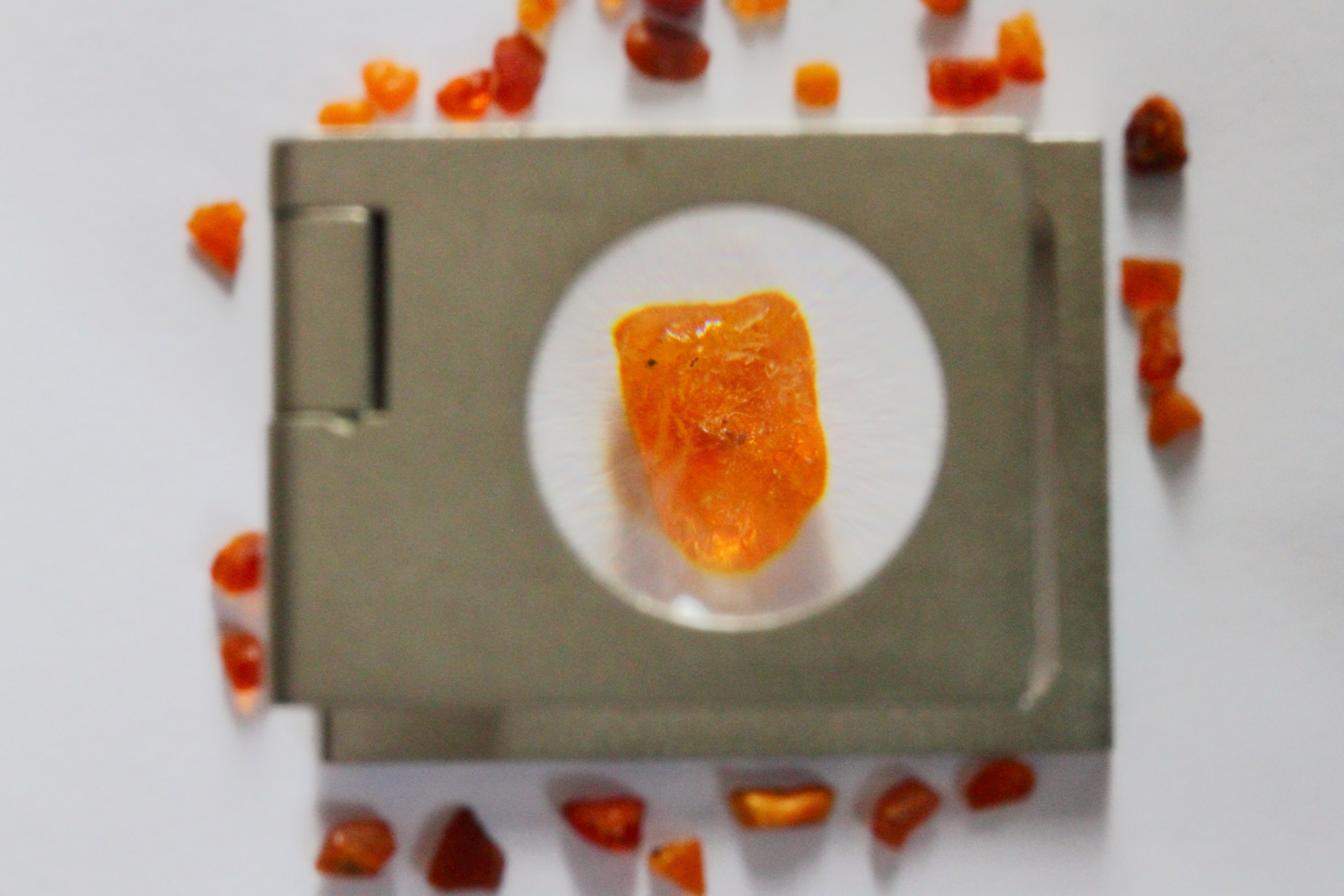
A grain of amber viewed through a linen tester

A linen tester is a strong magnifier with a measuring scale and a built-in stand.

The linen tester was invented to check the quality of woven fabrics. It is used in the textile industry to measure the number of weft and warp threads within a certain area of fabric. Today, it is more commonly used to measure the line width and check the registration of color separations in the field of printing and publishing.

It consists of a strong magnifier and a glass disc which has a measuring scale engraved in it. Nowadays, the scale is usually divided into millimetres; older linen testers had an inch scale. Simpler models have a square opening in the foot, with a scale applied to one or more edges of the opening.

Linen testers are also used in other branches of industry. For example, they can be used to measure the line weight of barcodes.
