= Cascadia College =

Community college in Bothell, Washington, US

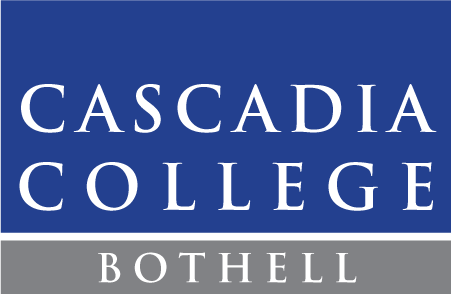
- Type: Public community college
- Established: 2000
- President: Eric W. Murray
- Students: 2,300
- Location: Bothell, Washington, United States; 47°45′39.89″N 122°11′28.46″W
- Campus: 128 acres (0.52 km^{2})
- Nickname: Kodiaks
- Mascot: Kody
- Website: www.cascadia.edu

Cascadia College is a public community college in Bothell, Washington, on a shared campus with the University of Washington Bothell. Established in 2000, Cascadia was built to serve the cities of Bothell, Woodinville, Kirkland, Kenmore, Duvall, Carnation, Sammamish, Redmond and other smaller communities within the greater Seattle area.

Cascadia offers two-year associate degrees, three bachelor's degree programs, continuing education courses, and professional and technical training. Cascadia is accredited by the Northwest Commission on Colleges and Universities.

== History ==
Historically created by legislative mandate, Cascadia Community College hired its first staff and faculty in 1999. These individuals numbered less than a dozen and handled all administrative duties including the development of curriculum and programs of studies, recruiting and hiring faculty and staff, and development and design of the permanent campus. Founding staff, administrators, and the four members of the innovative Cascadia "Curriculum and Learning Design Team" worked for twelve months in a small office in a business park just about one mile from the new Cascadia campus. Most important decisions were made or announced at a small communal table in the center of the Cascadia temporary office. In this room, all important decisions were deliberated and decided upon. Over 1,100 applications were screened to select just fifteen "Founding Faculty" members along with 55 Associate (part-time) Faculty who would be brought to Bothell in 2000 and oriented to join this innovative learning environment.

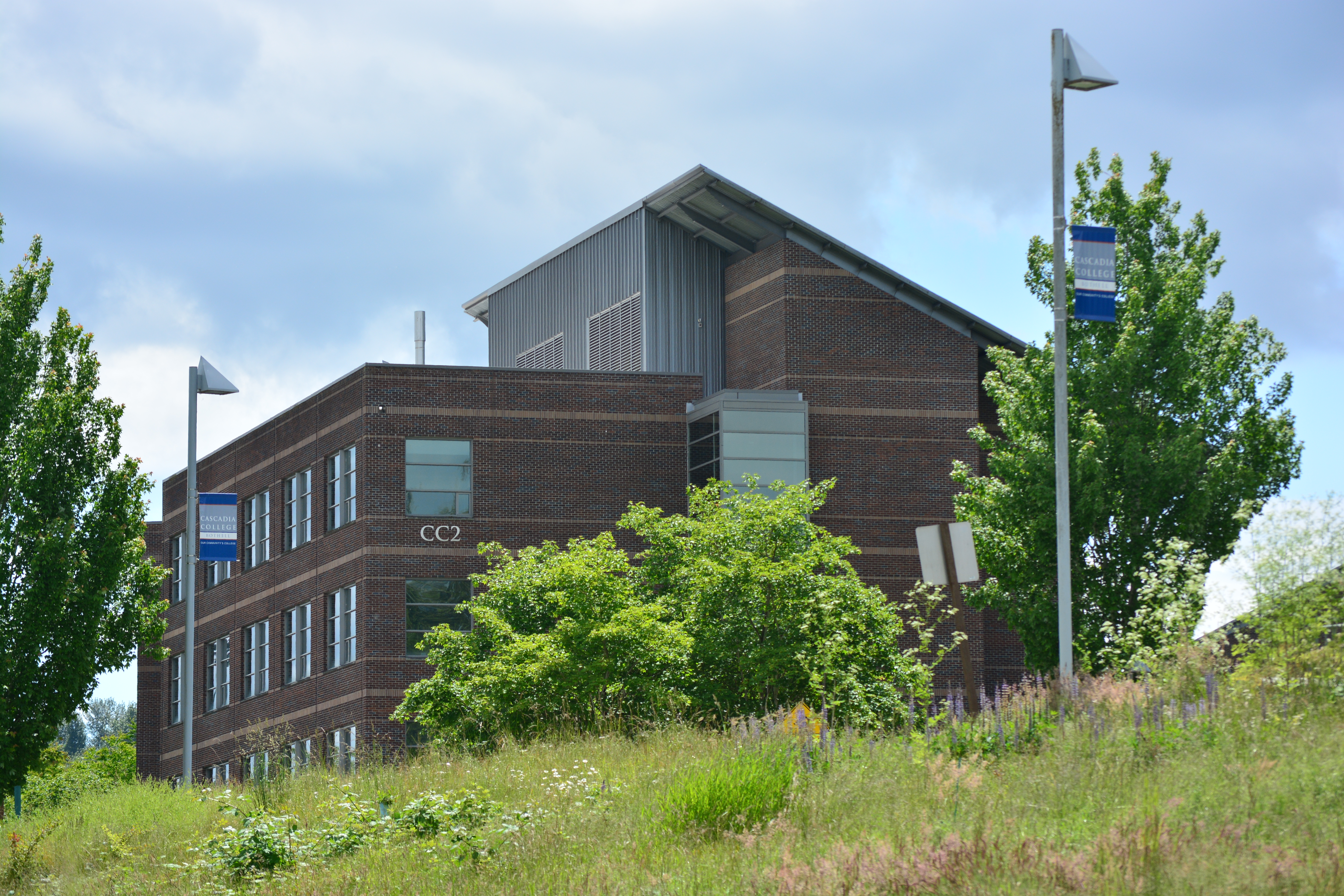
Cascadia College Building 2 - 01

The college opened with two buildings (CC1 and CC2) along with a building for the adjoining University of Washington Bothell campus. The plan for the third building, CC3, was not established until 2006 and CC3 was opened in 2009. CC3, or the Global Learning and the Arts Building (GLA), contains Mobius Hall, and is the only LEED platinum building on the Bothell campus. It was the second LEED platinum building in the state of Washington, and contains features such as external envelop stairwells, green roofs, solar panels, and rainwater capture to flush toilets.

In 2000, in recognition of its innovative structure, interdisciplinary curriculum, and outcomes-based organization, Cascadia was named as one of twelve "Vanguard Learning Colleges" by the League for Innovation in the Community College. In a 2007 list of the top U.S. two-year colleges created by Washington Monthly magazine, Cascadia ranked second, behind Atlanta Technical College.

In September 2014, the board of trustees voted to change the college's name to Cascadia College.

In the fall of 2024, Cascadia opened its joint STEM building with UWB, Innovation Hall. It is a mixed classroom and lab building jointly across both institutions and is certified LEED gold.

== Sustainability ==
=== Sustainable grounds ===
In 2018–2024, Cascadia College was recognized for its sustainable practices, as its grounds area was rated #1 in the nation by the AASHE STARS Sustainable Campus Index of 2018–24. Cascadia has been pesticide free since 2006 in conjunction with UW Bothell, and the campus has three orchard areas (including a Food Forest), a campus farm, and multiple rain gardens and building catchment.

The joint campus is also home to one of the largest wetland restoration areas on the Western US Coast, with a 58-acre restored wetland, constructed in 1998-2001. North Creek Wetland is also one of the most successful wetland restoration projects in Washington.

The Cascadia Permaculture Cornucopia Food Forest won a national AASHE Campus Achievement award in 2021 - for excellence for achievements for what the food forest showcased, a mix between environmental green space, equity and inclusion options for food access and cultural plantings, and space for staff, faculty, and students to use as both a living laboratory and a relaxation space.

Cascadia and UWB were certified Platinum for Green Ground with Rewild Your Campus in 2023. This is the highest tier of certification and only few campuses have it in the US.

Cascadia was awarded the Water Stewardship Award from the Puget Sound Business Journal in 2024 in the Environmental and Sustainability Awards.

=== LEED buildings ===
The joint campus has three LEED certified buildings, the Global Learning and the Arts Building (Mobius Hall or CC3) at LEED Platinum, the Discovery Hall (DISC) at LEED Gold, and Innovation Hall (INV) at LEED Gold. Some features of both buildings include solar panels, architectural design to capture sunlight to heat and light buildings, green roofs, energy-efficient HVAC systems, water catchment cisterns, and FSC certified wood. The architect for the Center for Global Learning & the Arts project was The Miller Hull Partnership.

=== Programs ===
Cascadia has two programs focused on sustainability: An associate in Water Resource Management, and a Bachelor's of Applied Science in Sustainable Practices (BASSP). The programs both focus on sustainability and environmentalism focusing on society and human impact, with the Water program specializing in surface water and stormwater, and the BASSP program being more comprehensive with a project and management focus for government and business careers. The BASSP program is an applied bachelors, with focuses on out of classroom experiences, a mix of hybrid and fully in-person classes, and a cohort model with internship and capstone requirements - guiding students towards a career in sustainability within companies, organizations, and government.

The Water Resource Management Program helps students find careers in water management with companies or local government for Stormwater, wetland, and stream management.

Cascadia also hosts several unique classes and programs- in American Indian and Indigenous Studies and Wetland Conservation/Ecology.
