= Tolt pipeline =

Coordinates: 47.7365°N 122.0808°W

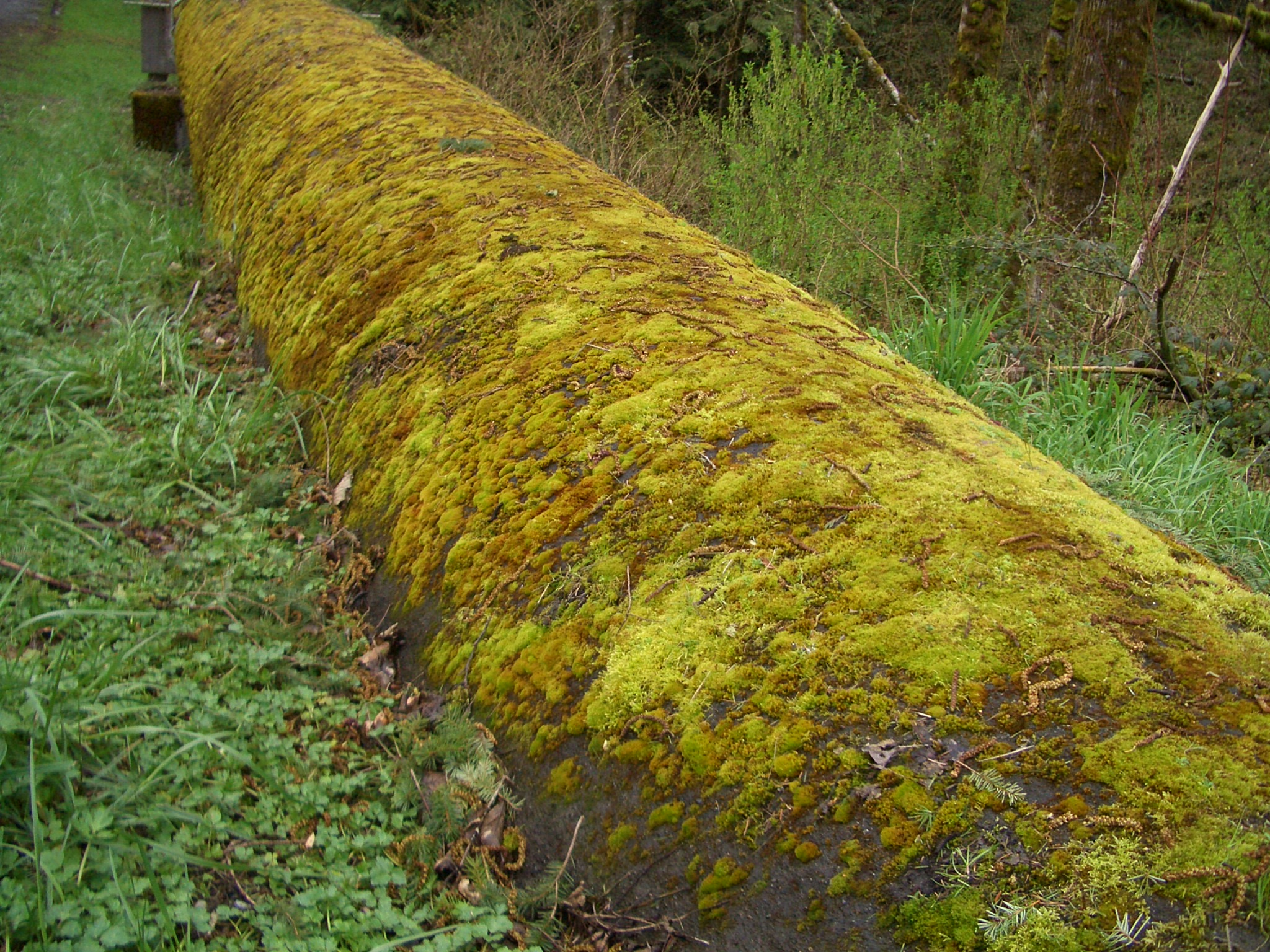
The pipes of Tolt Pipeline can be seen in places from Tolt Pipeline Trail

The Tolt pipeline runs from the Tolt Reservoir in the Cascade Range to the Lake Forest Park Reservoir, owned by the City of Seattle, supplying the city with about 30% of its water supply. It passes through Seattle's northern Eastside suburbs and also supplies several suburban cities and water districts.

The pipeline was originally built of wood slats wrapped with iron hoops. A section of the original pipeline can be viewed at the city of Kirkland's public works department.

== See also ==
- Tolt Pipeline Trail
