= University of Washington Bothell =

Public university in Bothell, Washington, U.S.

Coordinates: 47°45′34″N 122°11′28″W

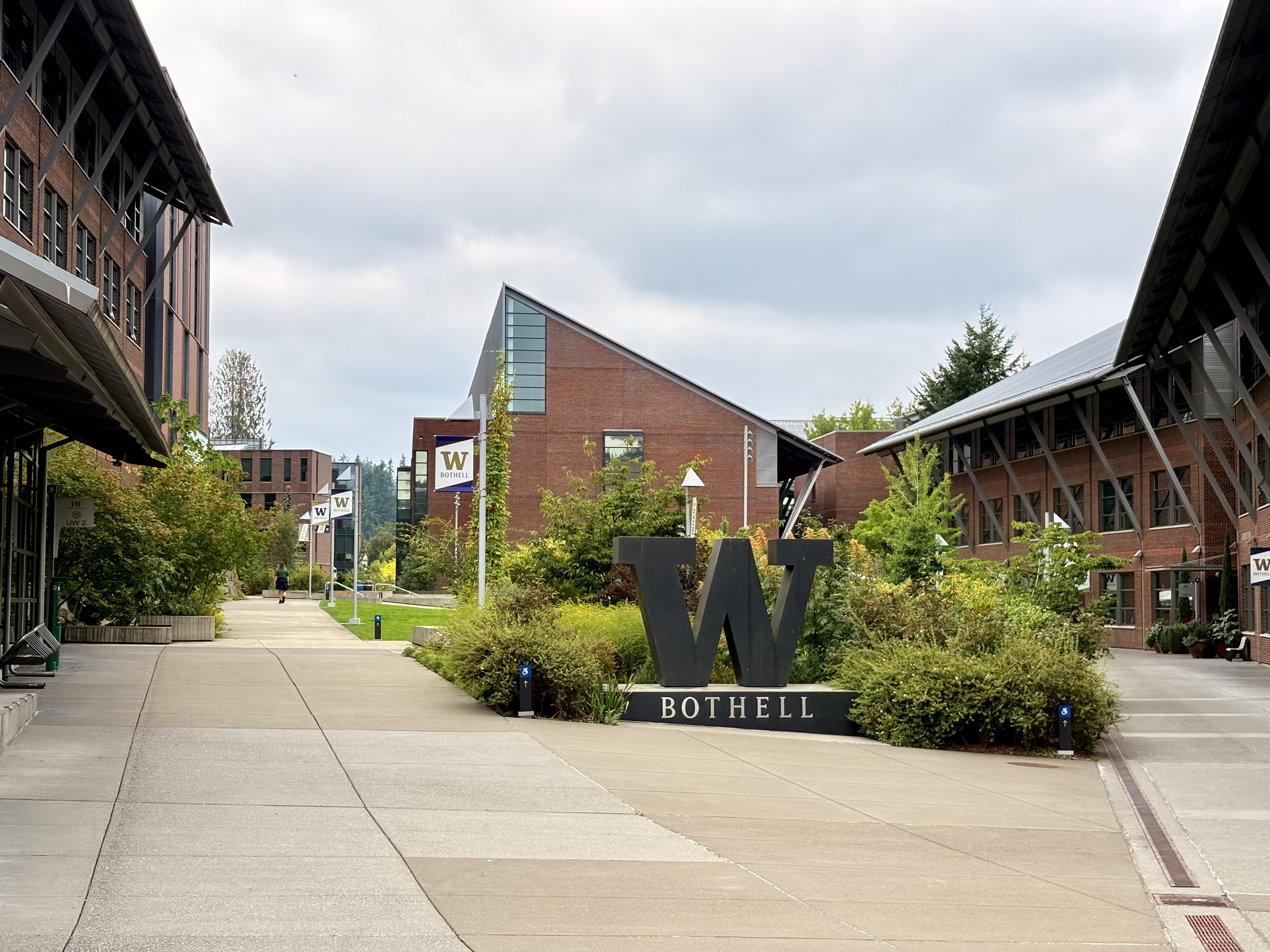
- Motto: Lux sit (Latin)
- Motto in English: Let there be light
- Type: Public university
- Established: 1989; 37 years ago
- Parent institution: University of Washington
- Accreditation: NWCCU
- Chancellor: Kristin Esterberg
- Faculty: 333
- Administrative staff: 381
- Students: 6,458
- Undergraduates: 5,938
- Postgraduates: 520
- Location: Bothell, Washington, United States
- Campus: 128 acres (0.5 km^{2}) (total); Suburban
- Other campuses: Seattle; Tacoma; Online
- Nickname: Huskies
- Mascot: Holly the Husky
- Website: uwb.edu

The University of Washington Bothell (UW Bothell or UWB) is a campus of the University of Washington and is located in Bothell, Washington. It was founded in 1989 and is one of the three campuses of the University of Washington, alongside the Seattle main campus and UW Tacoma. The campus is located near the junction of Interstate 405 and State Route 522; it is shared with Cascadia College, a public community college.

UW Bothell is led by a chancellor who leads the campus and reports to the president and provost of the University of Washington.

== History ==
=== 20th century ===
University of Washington Bothell was founded in 1989, when it was granted the approval of the Washington State Legislature, in order to expand access to the University of Washington for students in mainly King and Snohomish counties. The university began with a staff of 12 faculty members and a class of 143 students. Its first classes were held in fall 1990, and its first graduating class — of three students — completed their degrees in 1991. The permanent campus was built in the 1990s on a 115-acre (47 ha) cattle ranch that had been previously proposed for a regional shopping mall. Dr. Warren Buck III was appointed the university's first chancellor in July 1999 and served until June 2005. Over the course of his chancellorship, he oversaw the university's transition into a four-year institution and the establishment of its permanent campus in 2000.

=== 21st century ===
In 2005, UW Bothell was changed to a four-year university accepting high school graduates. In 2020, CNBC listed it as the public university that paid off the most, placing it ahead of the Seattle Campus (#3), Purdue University (#4), the University of Michigan (#5), UC Berkeley (#8), and UCLA (#10). In fall 2024, a new residential village opened providing more housing options to students.

== Academics ==
UW Bothell offers 33 undergraduate degree programs and fifteen master's degree programs among five schools:

- Business
- Educational Studies
- Interdisciplinary Arts and Sciences
- Nursing and Health Studies
- Science, Technology, Engineering and Mathematics

UWB falls under the accreditation of the University of Washington and students receive a University of Washington degree. In 2025, UW Bothell was classified a "Research College and University".

== Campus ==
Campus Buildings

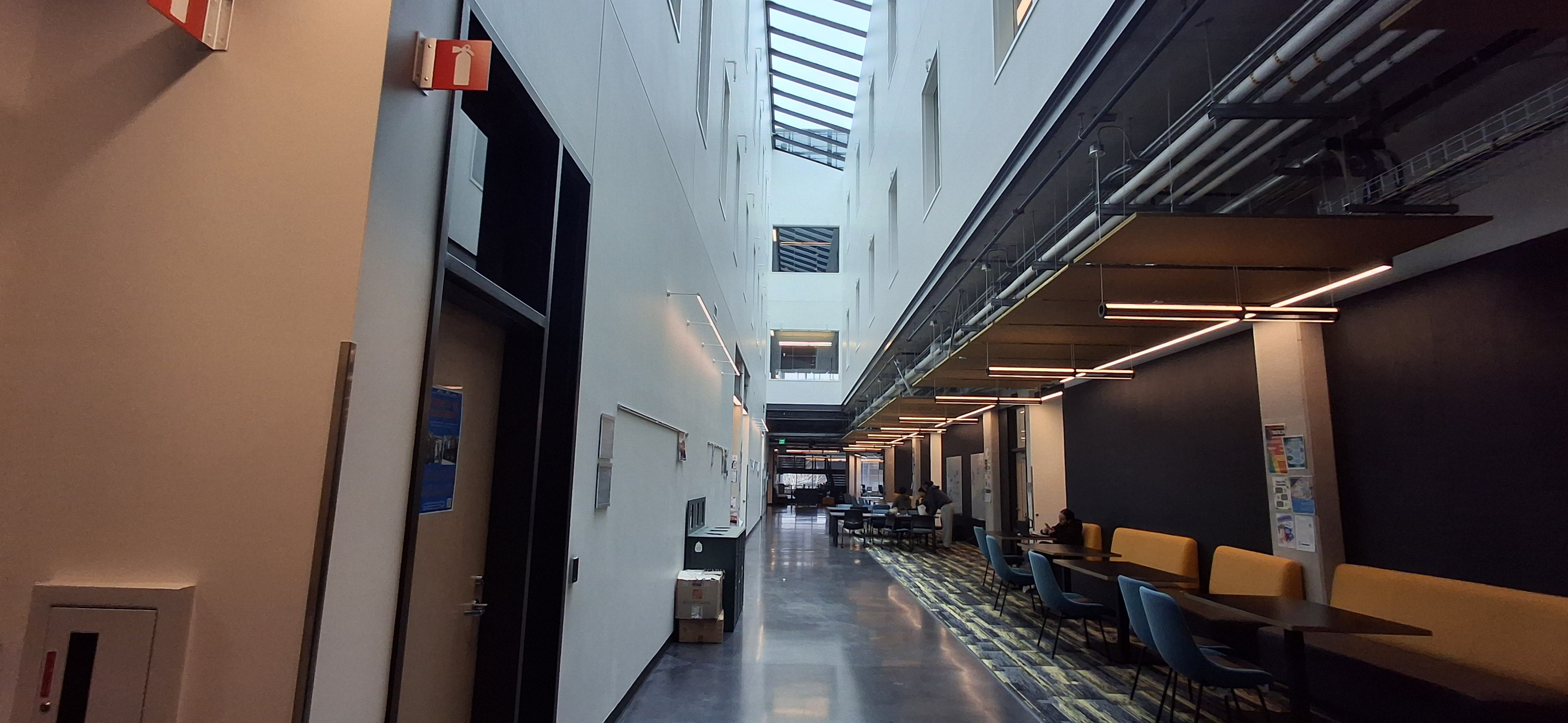
Innovation Hall

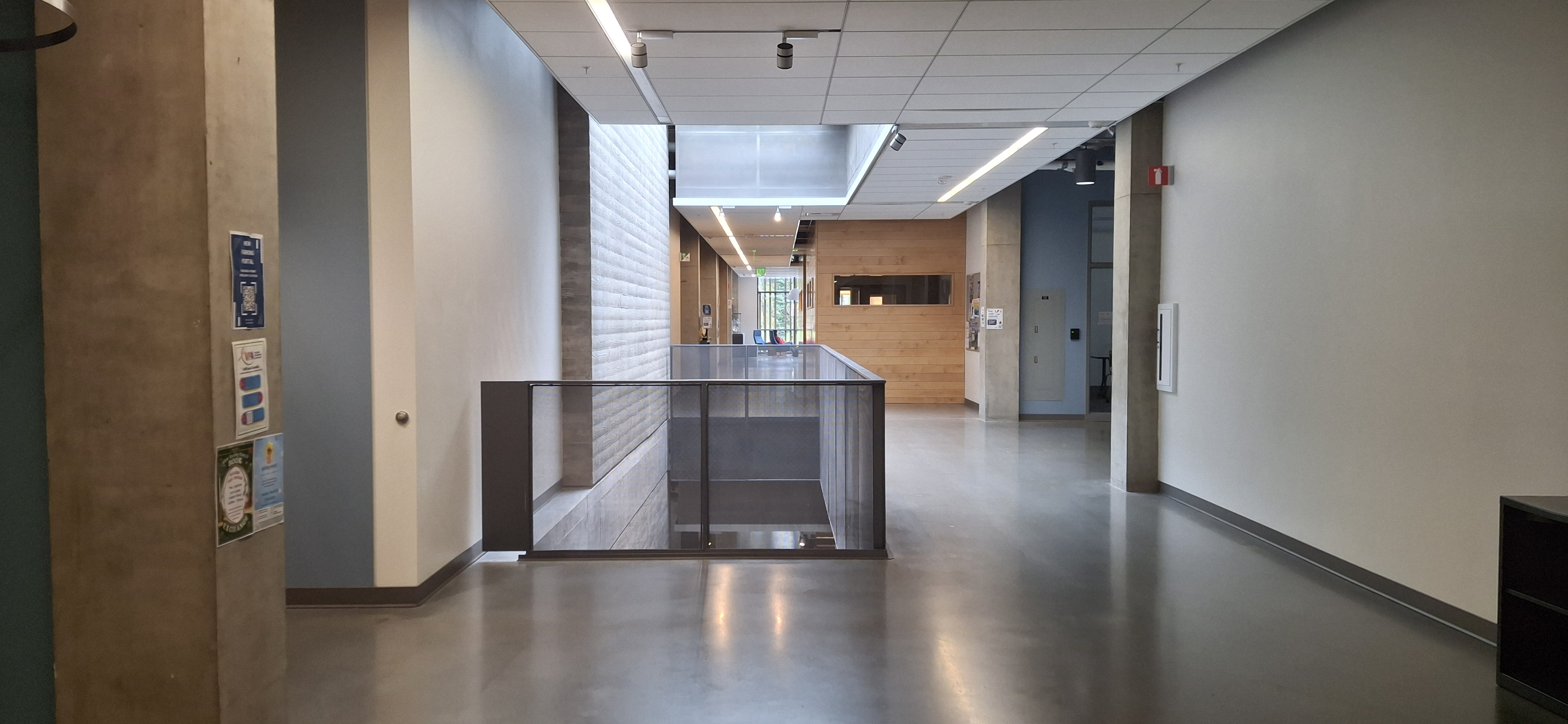
Discovery Hall

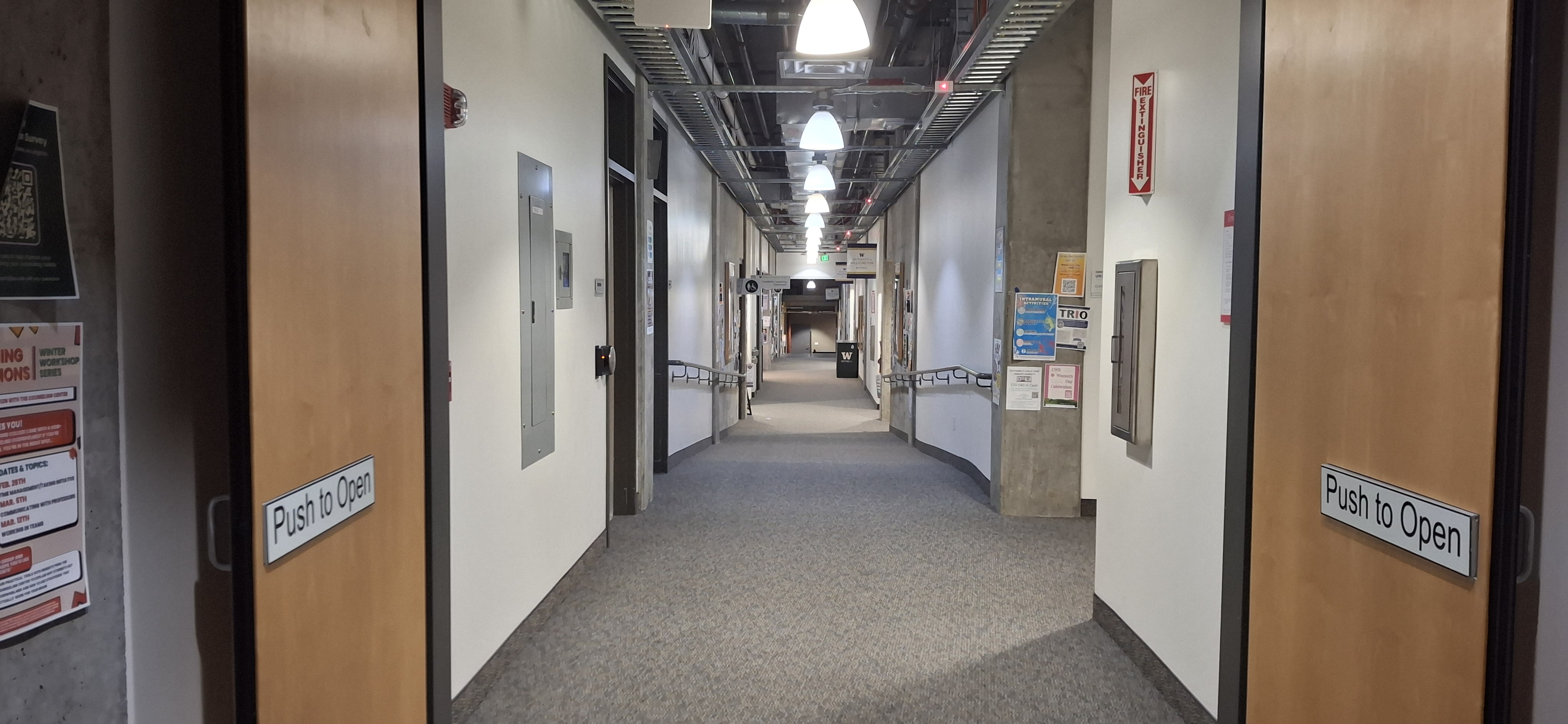
Commons Hall

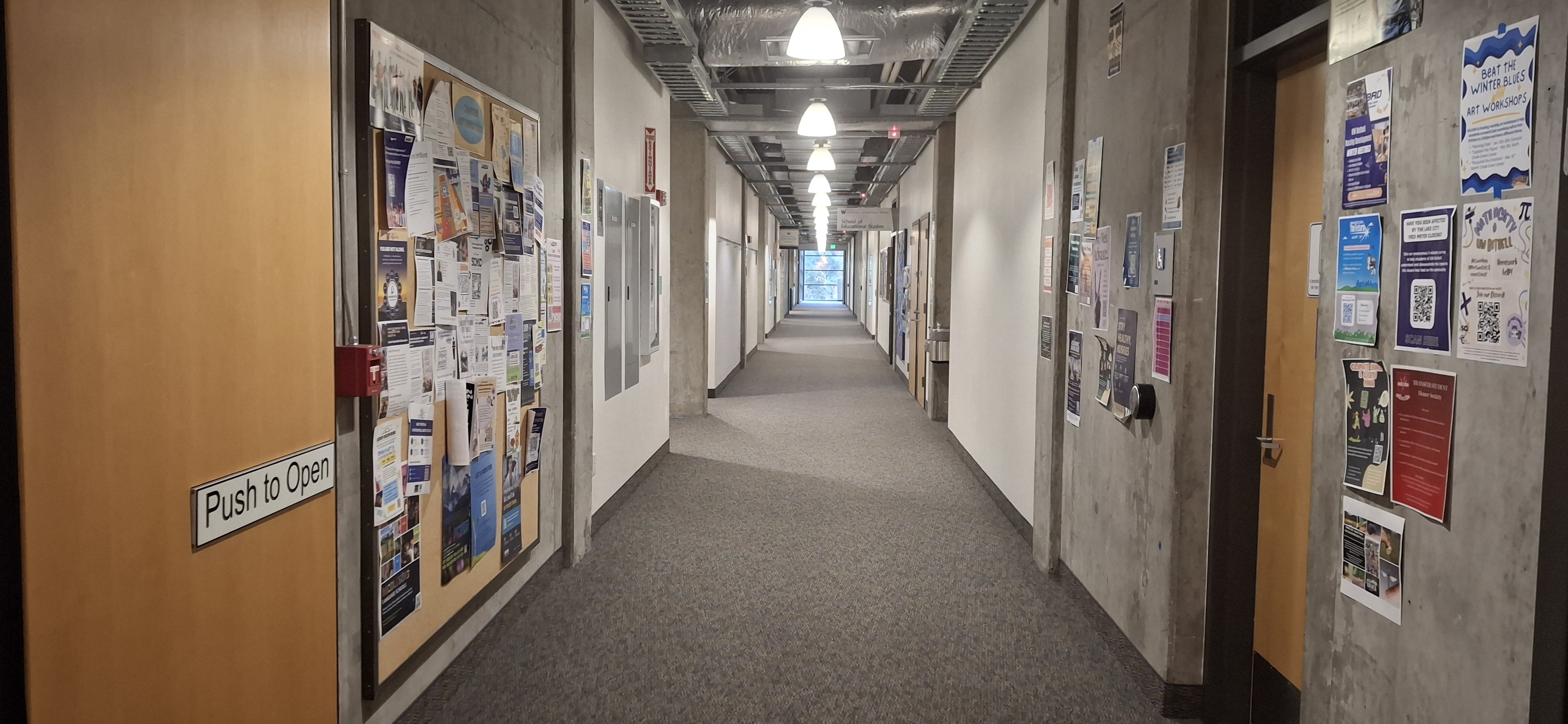
Founders Hall

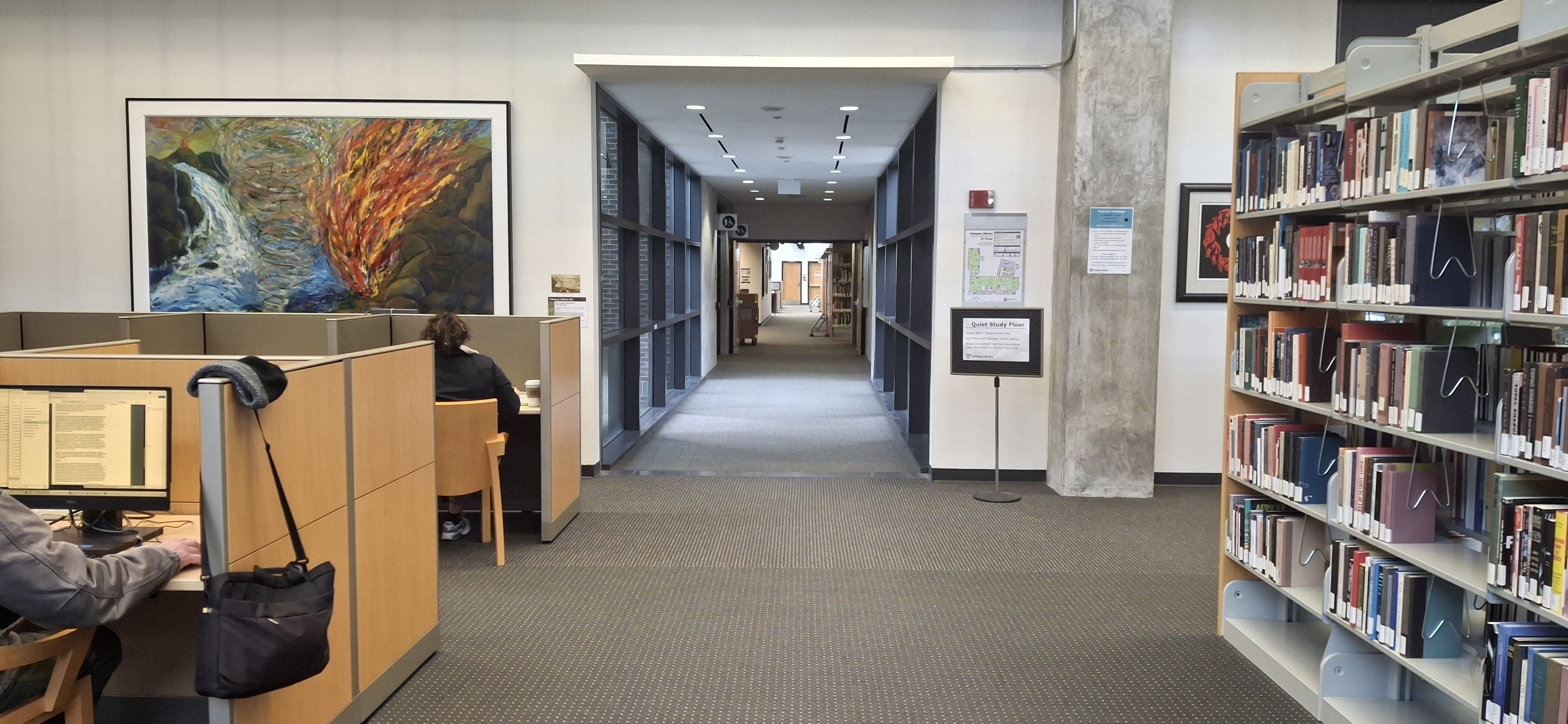
Library

UW Bothell's campus is shared with Cascadia College, however most buildings serve exclusively UW Bothell or Cascadia College. Buildings on campus include Founders Hall, Commons Hall, Discovery Hall, Innovation Hall, Husky Hall, and the Beardslee building. The Library as well as the Activities and Recreation Center (ARC) are shared between UW Bothell and Cascadia college. East of the main campus, there are volleyball, basketball, tennis, baseball, softball, football, and soccer facilities. There is also a boardwalk that extends out to North Creek as well as a bike trail that goes to the North Creek Trail as well as the Sammamish River Trail.

== Student life ==
UW Bothell enrolls over 6000 students in 55 undergraduate programs and graduate degree programs. UW Bothell began accepting freshmen in autumn 2006 and the first class to finish all four years at UW Bothell graduated in June 2010.

An agreement with the City of Bothell limits UW Bothell and Cascadia College enrollment. The enrollment limit is currently 10,000 FTE students. Initially, enrollment was limited to 3,000 FTE students until an entrance was built with direct access to State Route 522. The Washington State Department of Transportation completed this project in September 2009.

The overall undergraduate admission rate for 2026 was 86%, but admission to the university's Computer Science & Software Engineering (CSSE) program is highly competitive.

In 2026, 32 percent of the students identified as Asian, 27 percent White, 10 percent Hispanic or Latino, 10 percent Black or African American, 8 percent 2 or more races, 3 percent international, and less than 1 percent American Native/Alaska Native/Native Hawaiian/Pacific Islander.. The average GPA for admitted students was 3.75.

Undergraduate demographics as of Fall 2025
Race and ethnicity	Total
Asian	32%
White	27%
Hispanic	10%
Black	10%
Unknown	9%
Two or more races	8%
International student	3%

=== Housing ===
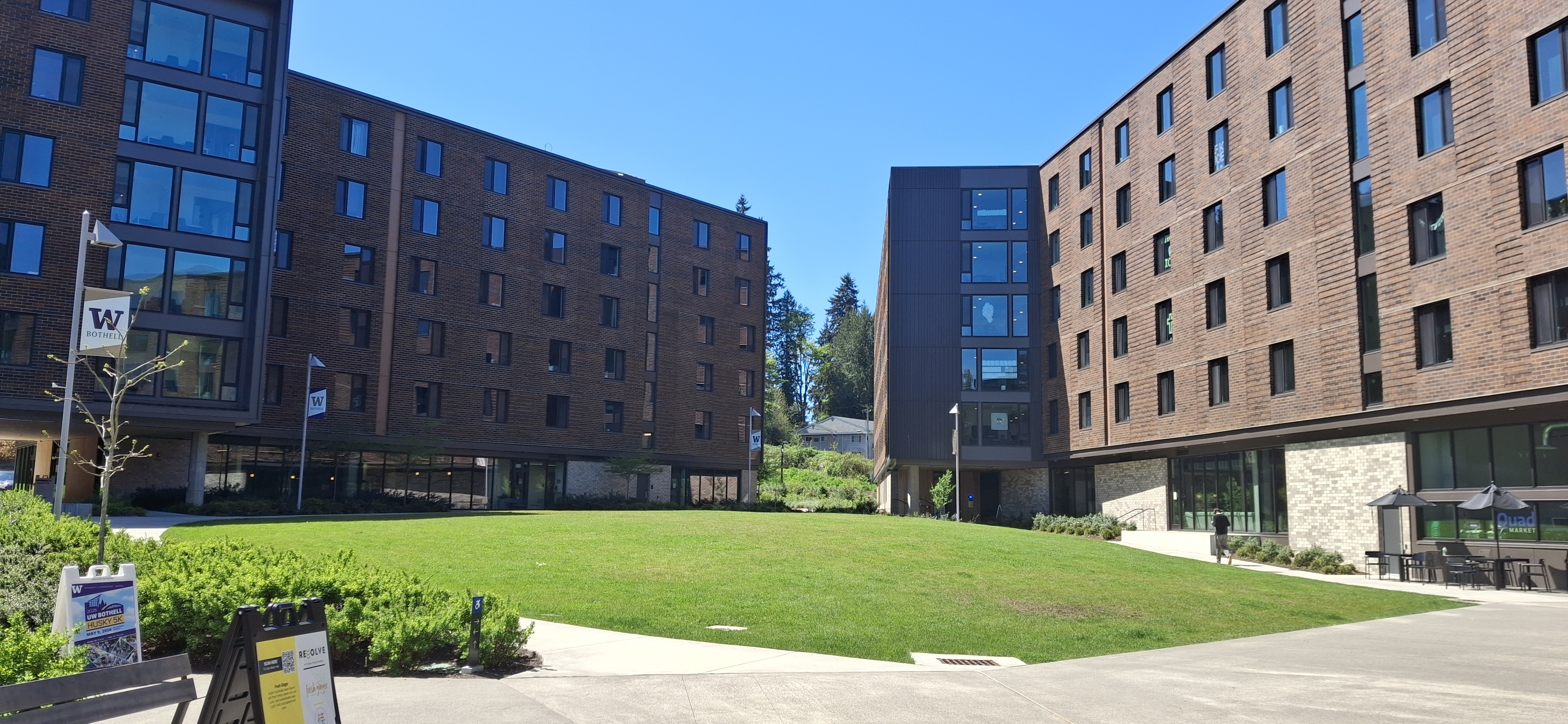
Residential Village

On-campus housing for UW Bothell students is in the Residential Village. The Residential Village is located northwest of the academic buildings, with students going between dorms and classrooms are required to cross 110th avenue NE as well as the transit center serving the campus. Cascadia College students may also live in the village. The new buildings, completed in fall 2024, replaced an earlier housing place called Husky Village which sat on the same location. There are three residential buildings on campus. The first one is Summit Hall, which serves first year students with suite-style units. The second one is Forest Hall, which serves second year and above students with suite-style units. The last one is Horizon Hall, which serves second year and above students with apartment-style units. Some amenities include study rooms, community spaces, on-site laundry, and a smart lock key system.

=== Dining ===
Food service on campus is provided by UW Bothell Food Services. The main dining building on campus is the Terrace Dining Pavilion located next to the residential halls, which has 3 restaurants inside. The main dining place is urban kitchen and market bar, which serves Buffet style meals. Other dining options in the Terrace pavilion include Revolve, which serves global food options like Chinese, Southeast Asian, and Indian food, and the Food Lab, which has rotating experimental food options like Poke and Korean Fried Chicken. Other food options inside the residence halls include Village Cafe which serves starbucks drinks, as well as the Quad Market which is a convenience store next to Village Cafe. Inside the academic portion of campus, there is The Market, a grab and go store serving sandwiches and pastries, and the Gold Brew cafe. Digital dining is provided by The Drop.

== Wetland restoration project ==
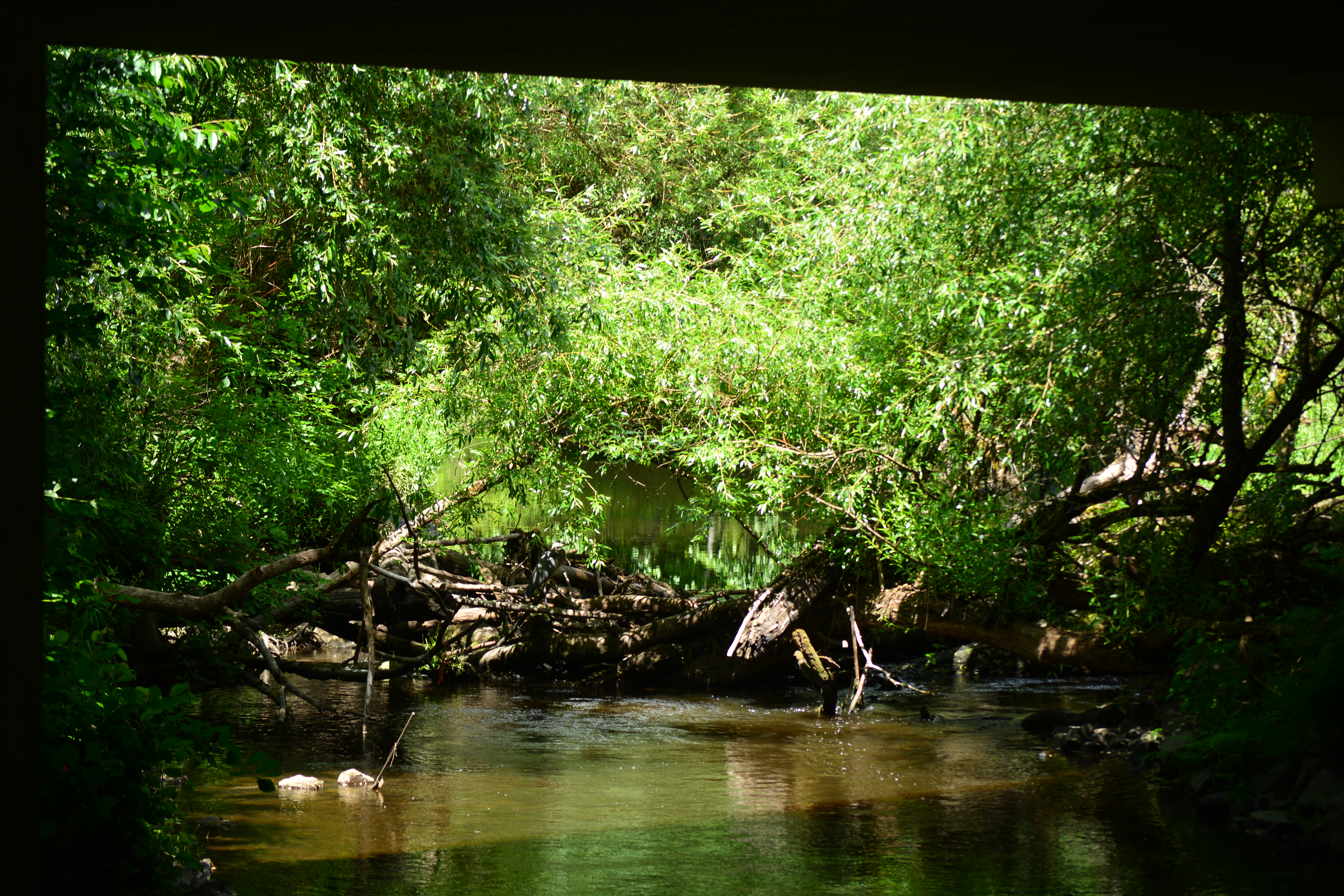
Looking from under Washington State Route 522 north into the wetland restoration area.

UW Bothell is home to one of the largest wetland restoration projects on the West Coast, covering 58 acres (23 ha). Prior to the restoration of the wetlands, the land had been used for cattle grazing. Before this North Creek was straightened and confined to transport timber from upper areas of the watershed to sawmills located around Lake Washington. The complex ecological restoration project for the wetlands began in 1997 along with the construction of University of Washington Bothell and Cascadia College campus. The goal of this project was to restore the area within the surrounding urban watershed into a sustainable and fully functional floodplain ecosystem. To manage and ensure forthcoming sustainability, great detail was given to essential theories of ecosystem science and ecological restoration in the design and implementation of the site. The hydrology was restored; drainage ditches and dikes were filled or removed. Small topographic variations were added to encourage environmental diversity and multiple plant communities. Between 1998 and 2002, over 100,000 plants were planted. Seven years after initial planting, the Wetland restoration project met its 10-year objectives.

The wetland is also an area for education. Over 30 courses from First-Year Programs, the School of Interdisciplinary Arts and Sciences, the School of Business, and the School of STEM (Science, Technology, Engineering and Math) have visited the restored wetland.
