= Chamber of Commerce Building =

Chamber of Commerce Building, or variations, may refer to:

- Chamber of Commerce Building (Berkeley, California), a National Register of Historic Places listing in Alameda County, California
- Chamber of Commerce Building (Denver, Colorado), a National Register of Historic Places listing in downtown Denver
- Chamber of Commerce Building (Steamboat Springs, Colorado)
- Lake Mary Chamber of Commerce Building, Lake Mary, Florida
- Chamber of Commerce Building (Terre Haute, Indiana)
- Chamber of Commerce Building (Baltimore, Maryland)
- Minneapolis Grain Exchange or Chamber of Commerce Building, Minneapolis, Minnesota
- Old Masonic Hall (Louisville, Mississippi), now known as the Chamber of Commerce Building
- Billings Chamber of Commerce Building, a National Register of Historic Places listing in Yellowstone County, Montana
- Jamaica Chamber of Commerce Building, New York, New York
- Chamber of Commerce Building (New York, New York)
- Chamber of Commerce (Rochester, New York)
- Chamber of Commerce Building (Greenville, South Carolina)
- US Chamber of Commerce Building, in Washington, DC
- Gould House/Greater Parkersburg Chamber of Commerce, Parkersburg, West Virginia

== See also ==
- Commerce Building (disambiguation)
