= Commerce Building =

Commerce Building may refer to:

- Commerce Building (St. Paul, Minnesota), listed on the NRHP in Minnesota
- Commerce Building (Everett, Washington), listed on the NRHP in Washington
- Commerce Building, Washington, D.C., the Herbert C. Hoover Building, site of the National Aquarium
- Commerce Building/Hancock Building, Miami, Oklahoma, National Register of Historic Places listings in Ottawa County, Oklahoma
- Commerce Building, the former headquarters of the Port Authority of New York and New Jerser, formerly known as Union Inland Terminal #1 and now as 111 Eighth Avenue

== See also ==
- Chamber of Commerce Building (disambiguation)
