= McCabe Building =

McCabe Building may refer to:

- McCabe Building (Victoria, Texas), listed on the National Register of Historic Places (NRHP)
- McCabe Building (Everett, Washington), listed on the NRHP in Snohomish County, Washington

== See also ==
- McCabe House, NRHP-listed in Charleston, West Virginia
