= National Register of Historic Places listings in Snohomish County, Washington =

Location of Snohomish County in Washington

The National Register of Historic Places (NRHP) is a list of districts, sites, buildings, structures, and objects in the United States that are designated for historic preservation. It is maintained by the National Park Service, a sub-agency of the federal Department of the Interior, and recognizes over 98,000 properties for their historic significance, artistic value, or other qualities. The listing does not place restrictions on the use or fate of properties unless they receive federal funding or other assistance, but does include tax credits for maintenance and rehabilitation of eligible sites.

The NRHP has 1,500 listings in Washington and 50 that are partially or wholly within Snohomish County. These properties include historic buildings in cities, fire lookouts in the Cascade Mountains, farms, monuments, and a ship.

This National Park Service list is complete through NPS recent listings posted August 21, 2026.

== Current listings ==
	Name on the Register	Image	Date listed	Location	City or town	Description
1	Bates-Tanner Farm	Bates-Tanner Farm	March 9, 1995 (#95000189)	3420 240th St. SE; 47°46′50″N 122°11′06″W	Bothell	Bothell MPS
2	Bush House	Bush House	September 8, 2017 (#100001597)	308 5th St. 47°49′12″N 121°33′15″W	Index	
3	Butler-Jackson House	Butler-Jackson House	May 14, 1998 (#97000494)	1703 Grand Ave. 47°59′16″N 122°12′40″W	Everett	
4	Andrew Carnegie Library	Andrew Carnegie Library	April 24, 1973 (#73001887)	118 5th Ave., N. 47°48′40″N 122°22′32″W	Edmonds	Carnegie Libraries of Washington TR (AD)
5	Commerce Building	Commerce Building	October 1, 1992 (#92001290)	1801 Hewitt Ave. 47°58′47″N 122°12′16″W	Everett	
6	Community Center and War Memorial Building	Community Center and War Memorial Building	February 26, 1979 (#79002554)	1611 Everett Ave. 47°58′56″N 122°12′22″W	Everett	
7	Darrington Ranger Station	Darrington Ranger Station	March 6, 1991 (#91000155)	1405 Emmens St. 48°15′40″N 121°36′09″W	Darrington	
8	Equator (schooner)	Equator (schooner)	April 14, 1972 (#72001281)	14th St. Yacht Basin; 47°59′52″N 122°12′50″W	Everett	
9	Everett Carnegie Library	Everett Carnegie Library	December 6, 1975 (#75001868)	3001 Oakes Ave. 47°58′40″N 122°12′10″W	Everett	Carnegie Libraries of Washington TR (AD)
10	Everett City Hall	Everett City Hall	May 2, 1990 (#90000674)	3002 Wetmore Ave. 47°58′39″N 122°12′22″W	Everett	Officially renamed the Mayor William E. Moore building in 2012.
11	Everett Fire Station No. 2	Everett Fire Station No. 2	May 2, 1990 (#90000673)	2801 Oakes Ave. 47°58′50″N 122°12′10″W	Everett	
12	Everett High School	Everett High School	June 4, 1997 (#97000493)	2400 Colby Ave. 47°59′07″N 122°12′29″W	Everett	
13	Evergreen Mountain Lookout	Evergreen Mountain Lookout	July 14, 1987 (#87001187)	Skykomish Ranger District on SW ridgecrest of Evergreen Mountain; 47°50′12″N 121°15′46″W	Skykomish	
14	Floral Hall	Floral Hall	April 26, 1990 (#90000671)	Forest Park; 47°57′33″N 122°13′07″W	Everett	
15	Charles and Idalia Fratt House	Charles and Idalia Fratt House	May 8, 2017 (#100000991)	1725 Grand Ave. 47°59′39″N 122°12′44″W	Everett	
16	Green Mountain Lookout	Green Mountain Lookout	February 22, 1988 (#88000117)	Darrington Ranger District; 48°17′30″N 121°14′15″W	Darrington	
17	Grimm House	Grimm House	March 9, 1995 (#95000191)	12402 Mill Spur; 48°00′49″N 122°03′55″W	Lake Stevens	Moved in 1996 and 2021.
18	Roland Hartley House	Roland Hartley House	May 2, 1986 (#86000958)	2320 Rucker Ave. 47°59′12″N 122°12′37″W	Everett	
19	Hewitt Avenue Historic District	Hewitt Avenue Historic District	December 13, 2010 (#10001020)	1620-1915 Hewitt Ave. and portions of Wetmore, Rockefeller, Oakes, and Lombard Ave. 47°58′45″N 122°12′19″W	Everett	
20	Horseshoe Bend Placer Claim	Horseshoe Bend Placer Claim	May 7, 1981 (#81000590)	North of Sultan; 47°55′41″N 121°48′20″W	Sultan	
21	Indian Shaker Church	Indian Shaker Church	May 4, 1976 (#76001910)	West of Marysville, Tulalip Reservation, N. Meridan Ave. 48°02′32″N 122°13′52″W	Marysville	An Indian Shaker Church denomination building, presumably
22	Keeler's Korner	Keeler's Korner	April 29, 1982 (#82004287)	16401 U.S. 99; 47°51′00″N 122°17′30″W	Lynnwood	NRHP listing #51549. Gas station & grocery store dating from 1927.
23	Longfellow Elementary School	Longfellow Elementary School	July 30, 2021 (#100006802)	3715 Oakes Ave. 47°58′07″N 122°12′14″W	Everett	
24	Marysville Opera House	Marysville Opera House	February 25, 1982 (#82004288)	1225 3rd St. 48°03′04″N 122°10′46″W	Marysville	
25	McCabe Building	McCabe Building	October 21, 1977 (#77001359)	3120 Hewitt Ave. 47°58′44″N 122°11′15″W	Everett	
26	Miners Ridge Lookout	Miners Ridge Lookout	July 19, 1987 (#87001183)	Darrington Ranger District in Glacier Peak Wilderness area 5 miles (8.0 km) west of Pacific Crest trail 48°12′26″N 121°01′41″W	Darrington	
27	Monte Cristo Hotel	Monte Cristo Hotel	June 3, 1976 (#76001907)	1507 Wall St. 47°58′41″N 122°12′30″W	Everett	
28	Mukilteo Light Station	Mukilteo Light Station	October 21, 1977 (#77001360)	WA 525; 47°56′56″N 122°18′18″W	Mukilteo	
29	Naval Auxiliary Air Station-Arlington	Naval Auxiliary Air Station-Arlington	June 30, 1995 (#95000802)	18204 59th Dr. NE., Arlington Municipal Airport; Boundary increase (listed March 27, 2012, refnum 12000163): 18204 59th Dr., NE; 48°09′49″N 122°09′33″W	Arlington	
30	North Coast Casket Company Building	North Coast Casket Company Building	August 8, 2006 (#06000700)	1210 W. Marine View Dr. 48°00′10″N 122°12′54″W	Everett	Now demolished. Deconstructed in 2011 by Port of Everett after lengthy battle on preservation vs. site redevelopment. Commonly known as the Collins Building.
31	North Creek School	North Creek School	May 19, 1994 (#94000406)	1129 208th Street SE; 47°48′31″N 122°13′02″W	Bothell	Moved to Centennial Park in 2008.
32	D. O. Pearson House	D. O. Pearson House	May 25, 1973 (#73001890)	Pearson and Market Sts. 48°14′31″N 122°22′11″W	Stanwood	NRHP listing #73001890 Now part of the Stanwood Area History Museum.
33	Point Elliott Treaty Monument	Point Elliott Treaty Monument	April 14, 2004 (#04000316)	Jct. of Lincoln Ave. and 3rd St. 47°56′54″N 122°18′12″W	Mukilteo	
34	Red Men Hall	Red Men Hall	April 13, 1973 (#73001889)	530 Index Avenue; 47°49′18″N 121°33′14″W	Index	Collapsed January 1, 2009
35	Rucker Hill Historic District	Rucker Hill Historic District	November 8, 1989 (#89000399)	Roughly bounded by 32nd, Tulalip Ave., Bell Ave., Snohomish Ave., Laurel, and Warren; 47°58′23″N 122°13′14″W	Everett	
36	Rucker House	Rucker House	December 4, 1975 (#75001869)	412 Laurel Dr. 47°58′23″N 122°13′21″W	Everett	
37	Snohomish County Courthouse	Snohomish County Courthouse	December 6, 1975 (#75001870)	Wetmore Ave. between Wall St. and Pacific Ave. 47°58′39″N 122°12′19″W	Everett	
38	Snohomish Historic District	Snohomish Historic District	October 22, 1974 (#74001978)	Roughly bounded by Ave. E, 5th St., Union Ave., Northern Pacific RR and Snohomish River; 47°54′46″N 122°05′36″W	Snohomish	
39	St. Anne's Roman Catholic Church	St. Anne's Roman Catholic Church	June 18, 1976 (#76001911)	West of Marysville on Mission Beach Rd. 48°03′43″N 122°16′34″W	Marysville	
40	Stanwood IOOF Public Hall	Stanwood IOOF Public Hall	February 21, 2002 (#02000087)	27128 102nd Ave. NW; 48°14′35″N 122°22′11″W	Stanwood	Now Floyd Norgaard Cultural Center.
41	Suiattle Guard Station	Suiattle Guard Station	December 18, 1990 (#90001865)	Suiattle River east of Buck Cr., Mt. Baker-Snoqualmie NF; 48°15′42″N 121°19′04″W	Darrington	
42	Swalwell Block and Adjoining Commercial Buildings	Swalwell Block and Adjoining Commercial Buildings	May 17, 1976 (#76001908)	2901-2909 and 2915 Hewitt Ave. 47°58′47″N 122°11′26″W	Everett	
43	Swalwell Cottage	Swalwell Cottage	November 28, 1978 (#78002773)	2712 Pine St. 47°58′53″N 122°11′29″W	Everett	
44	Three Fingers Lookout	Three Fingers Lookout	July 14, 1987 (#87001190)	Darrington Ranger District on the southernmost peak 48°10′12″N 121°41′11″W	Darrington	
45	Trafton School	Trafton School	October 30, 2006 (#06000730)	12616 Jim Creek Rd. 48°14′19″N 122°03′36″W	Arlington	Rural Public Schools of Washington State MPS
46	Tulalip Indian Agency Office	Tulalip Indian Agency Office	May 3, 1976 (#76001912)	7615 Totem Beach Rd., Tulalip Reservation; 48°03′55″N 122°17′08″W	Marysville	Street renamed and numbered.
47	U.S. Post Office and Customshouse	U.S. Post Office and Customshouse	June 22, 1976 (#76001909)	3006 Colby Ave. 47°58′40″N 122°12′27″W	Everett	Also known as the Federal Building and as Peed Hall (from a recent period when it was owned by Cogswell College).
48	Verlot Ranger Station-Public Service Center	Verlot Ranger Station-Public Service Center	April 8, 1986 (#86000839)	Mt. Baker, Snoqualmie National Forest; 48°05′38″N 121°46′46″W	Granite Falls	NRHP listing #86000839
49	Weyerhaeuser Timber Company Office Building	Weyerhaeuser Timber Company Office Building	January 2, 2024 (#100009679)	615 Millwright Loop N 48°00′05″N 122°13′17″W	Everett	Re-listed following delisting in 2022.
50	Winningham Farm	Winningham Farm	May 13, 1994 (#94000418)	3214 228th St. SE. 47°47′28″N 122°10′55″W	Bothell	

== Former listings ==
	Name on the Register	Image	Date listed	Date removed	Location	City or town	Description
1	"Jack Knife" Bridge	"Jack Knife" Bridge	July 16, 1982 (#73001888)	July 16, 1990	Spans the Ebey Slough at Home Acres Rd. E of Everett; 47°59′35″N 122°09′53″W	Everett vicinity	The bridge was replaced in its site spanning Ebey Slough. The image shows the formerly landmarked bridge in its new location. No longer a bascule, it now functions as a stationary footbridge to Spencer Island Park, crossing Union Slough east of Everett.
2	Weyerhaeuser Office Building	Weyerhaeuser Office Building	May 14, 1986 (#86001079)	December 19, 2022	1710 W. Marine View Dr. 47°59′43″N 122°12′47″W	Everett	Re-listed in 2024 after move and renovation.

== See also ==
- National Register of Historic Places listings in Washington state
- Listings in neighboring counties: Chelan, Island, King, Kitsap, Skagit
- Historic preservation
- History of Washington (state)
- Index of Washington (state)-related articles
