= Weyerhaeuser Office Building =

- U.S. National Register of Historic Places
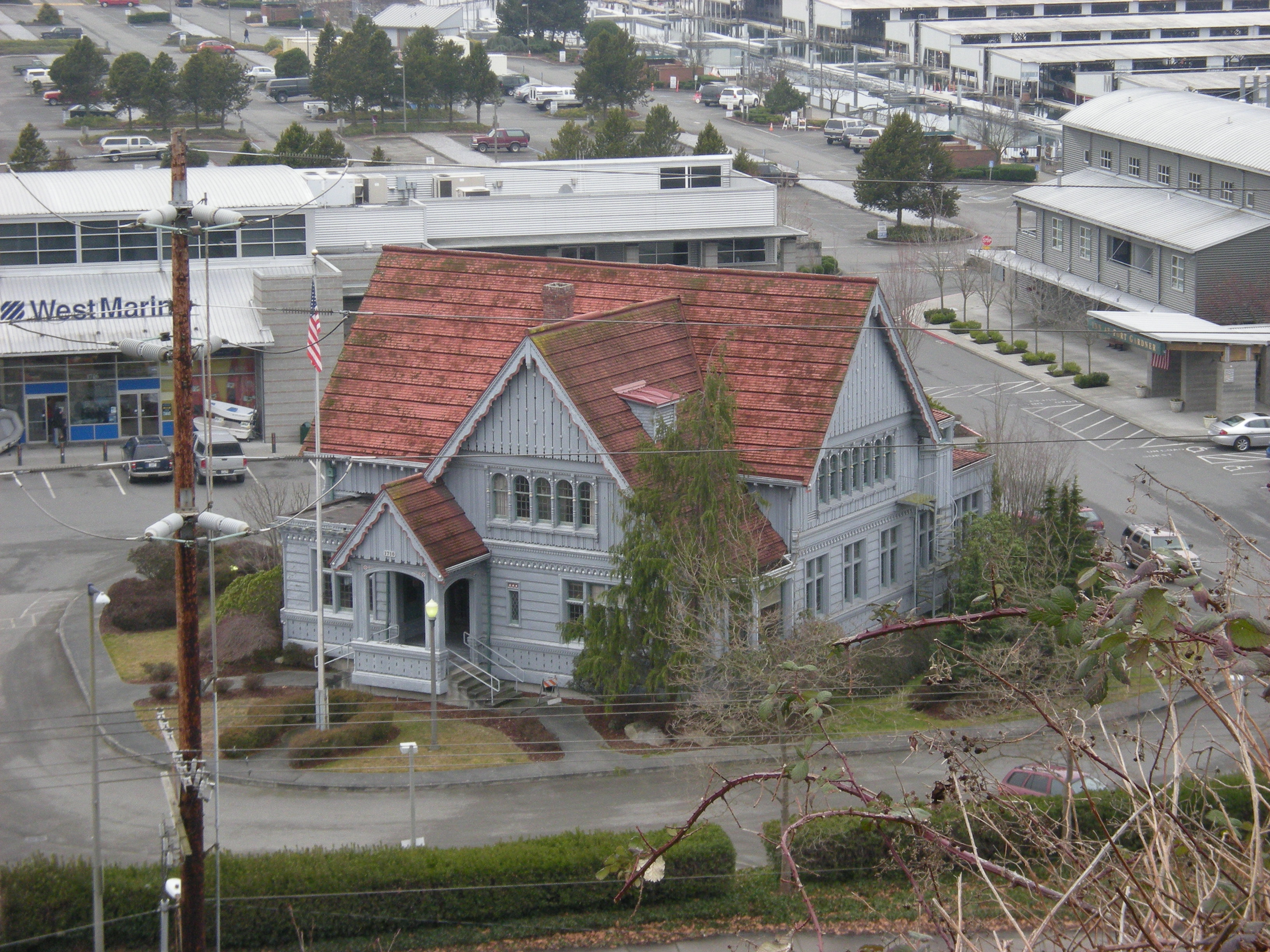

- Location within Washington (state)
- Location: 1710 W. Marine View Dr., Everett, Washington
- Coordinates: 48°00′05.3″N 122°13′21.1″W
- Area: less than one acre
- Built: 1923
- Architect: Carl F. Gould
- Architectural style: English Gothic cottage
- NRHP reference No.: 86001079 (original); 100009679 (increase)

Significant dates
- Added to NRHP: May 14, 1986
- Delisted from NRHP: December 19, 2022
- Added to NRHP: January 2, 2024

The Weyerhaeuser Office Building is a historic building located in Everett, Washington. It was built in 1923 as offices for Weyerhaeuser, at the time the largest employer in Everett; the company commissioned architect Carl Gould to design a 6,000-square-foot (560 m^{2}) building that would showcase local wood varieties such as fir, cedar, and hemlock. The building houses a two-story, concrete-and-steel, 160 ton vault that was originally used to store the company payroll. The Gothic-style structure was erected at the company's first Everett plant, known as Mill A.

The building was first moved by barge in 1938. It was located up the Snohomish River to the company's Mill B, located near the Legion Memorial Golf Course. The structure served as an office space until the mill closed in 1979. In 1983, the building was donated to the Port of Everett. It was relocated at the Port's south marina the following year and served as an office space for the Everett Chamber of Commerce in the 1980s.

In July 2016, the structure was relocated to Boxcar Park, located within the Esplanade District at the water's edge. The building had been moved twice before to other locations around Everett, most recently in 2016. The building includes a 100-ton safe which complicated its move.

The port planned to reopen the building in 2020, but the economic impact of the COVID-19 pandemic rendered the renovation work cost-prohibitive without a private partner. The port commission eventually approved a ten-year lease with The Lokey Group, led by Whidbey Island restaurateur Jack Ng, to operate the building as a bar, coffee shop, and museum in March 2022. The renovated building, designed by Flat Rock Productions, tentatively renamed The Muse, was projected to open on March 23, 2023, to mark the centennial of its original opening. The opening of the coffeeshop and bar at the Muse was delayed to July 2023.

The re-envisioning of the Weyerhaeuser Office Building received the Historic Renovation of the Year Award from the Washington state chapter of the NAIOP.

The Weyerhaeuser Office Building was listed on the National Register of Historic Places in 1986 and delisted in 2022 following the move. It was re-added to the historic register in 2024.

== See also ==
- National Register of Historic Places listings in Snohomish County, Washington
