= North Coast Casket Company Building =

- U.S. National Register of Historic Places
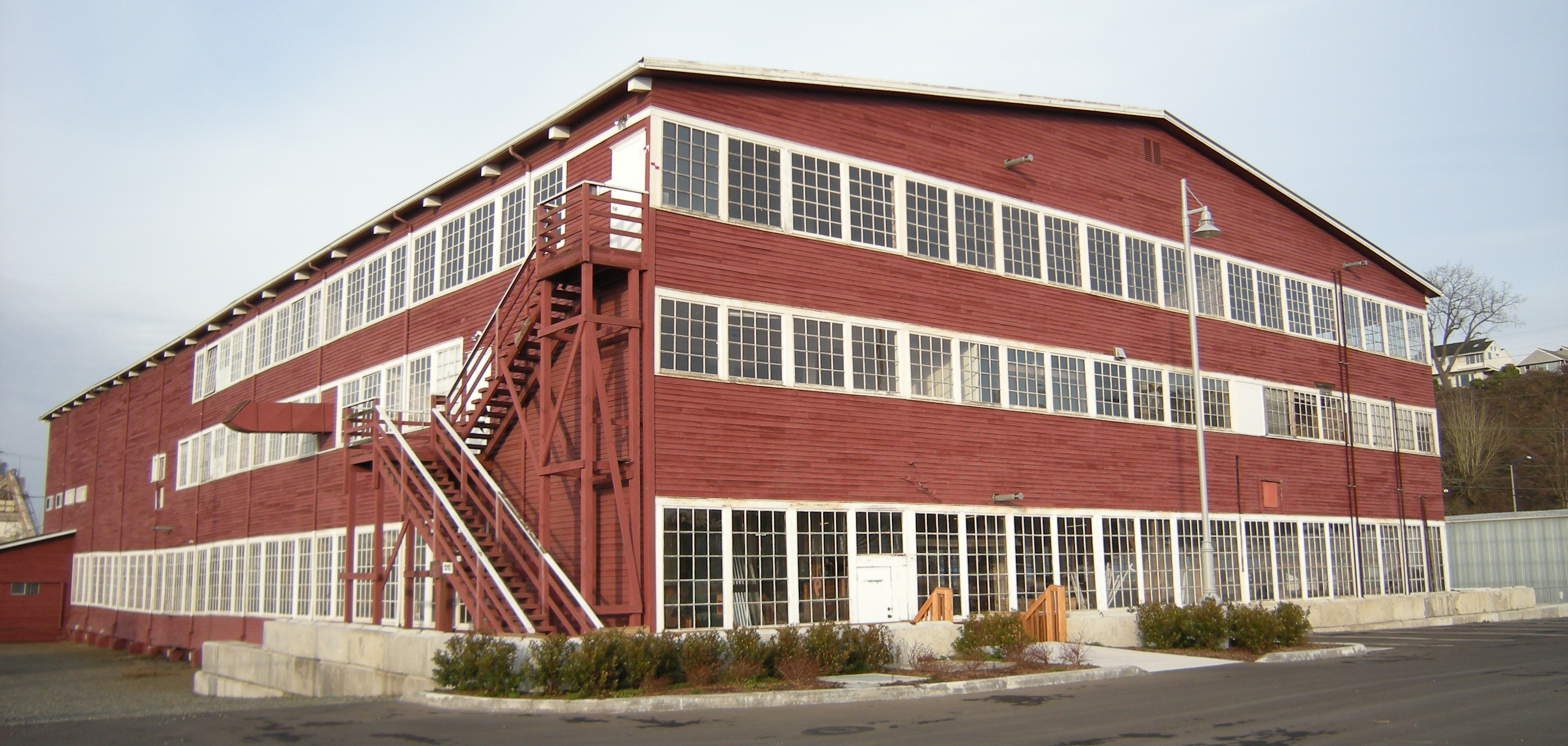

- Location within Washington (state)
- Location: 1210 W. Marine View Dr., Everett, Washington
- Coordinates: 48°0′10″N 122°12′54″W
- Area: less than one acre
- Built: 1926
- Architectural style: general mill construction
- NRHP reference No.: 06000700
- Added to NRHP: August 8, 2006

The North Coast Casket Company Building was a building located in Everett, Washington listed on the National Register of Historic Places. The building was built in 1926 when William G. Humbert added a casket production building for his mill. It had been known as the North Coast Casket Company Building and the Collins Building.

While the building was placed on the National Register of Historical Places in 2006, costs made the building's renovations impractical. The building was deconstructed in 2010.

== See also ==
- National Register of Historic Places listings in Snohomish County, Washington
