= Everett Fire Station No. 2 =

- Historic Everett Fire Station No. 2
- U.S. National Register of Historic Places
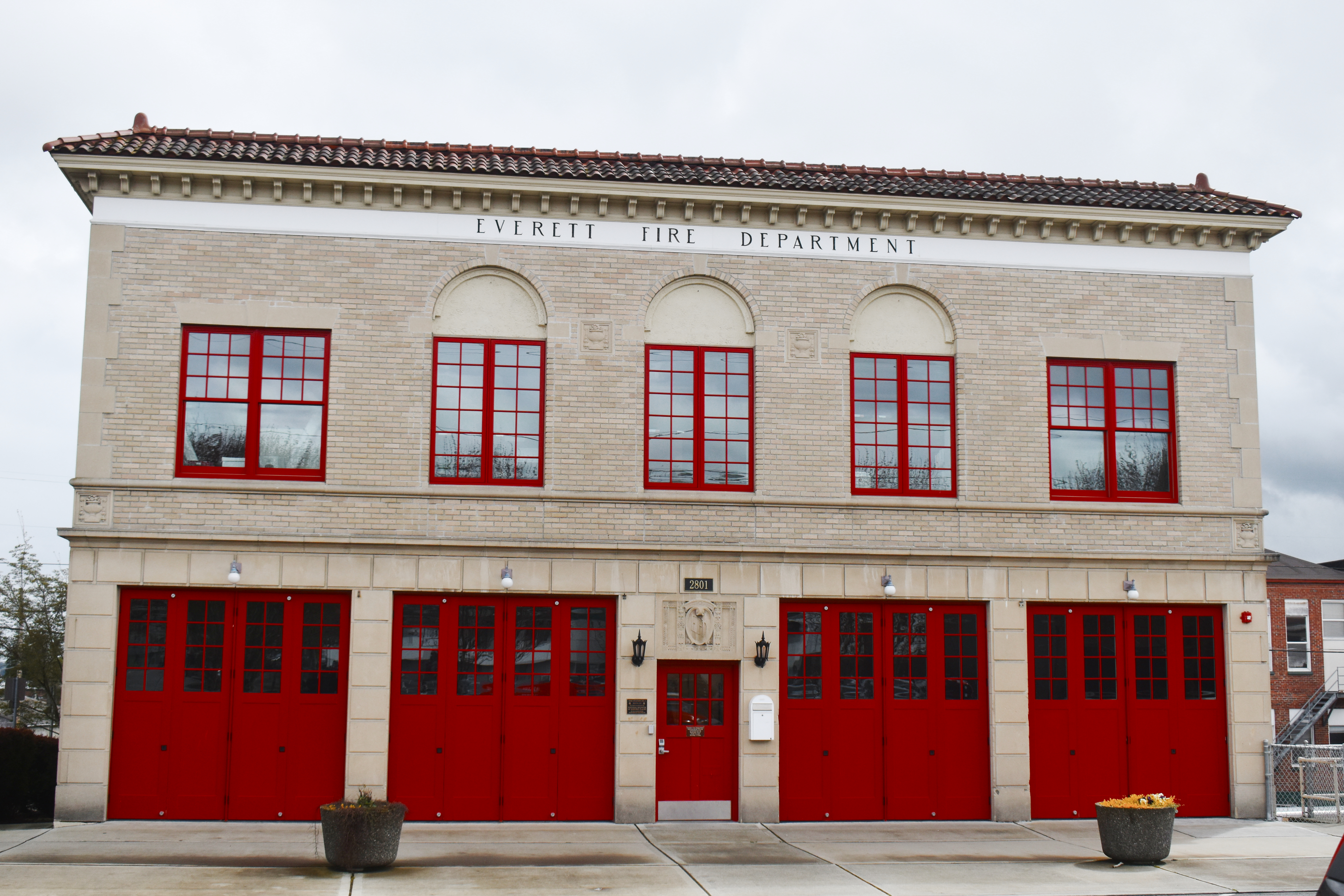
- Front of building in 2024

- Location within Washington (state) Location within the United States
- Location: 2801 Oakes Ave., Everett, Washington
- Coordinates: 47°58′50″N 122°12′10″W
- Area: less than 1 acre (0.40 ha)
- Built: 1925
- Built by: Solie & Wahl
- Architect: Morrison & Stimson
- Architectural style: Classical Revival
- NRHP reference No.: 90000673
- Added to NRHP: 2 May 1990

Everett Fire Station No. 2 is a historic building located in Everett, Washington.

== Description and history ==
Designed by Earl Morrison and Vas Stimson in the Classical Revival style, Everett Fire Station No. 2 was built in 1925 by Solie and Wahl. The two-story structure with a trapezoidal floor plan, sits on a concrete foundation and has a basement. A 10-foot (3.0 m) hose tower projects from the south corner of the rear wall. It was listed on the National Register of Historic Places on May 2, 1990. As of 2020 the building is used as a training facility by the Everett City Fire Department.

== See also ==
- History of firefighting
- Historic preservation
- National Register of Historic Places listings in Snohomish County, Washington
