= North Creek School =

- U.S. National Register of Historic Places
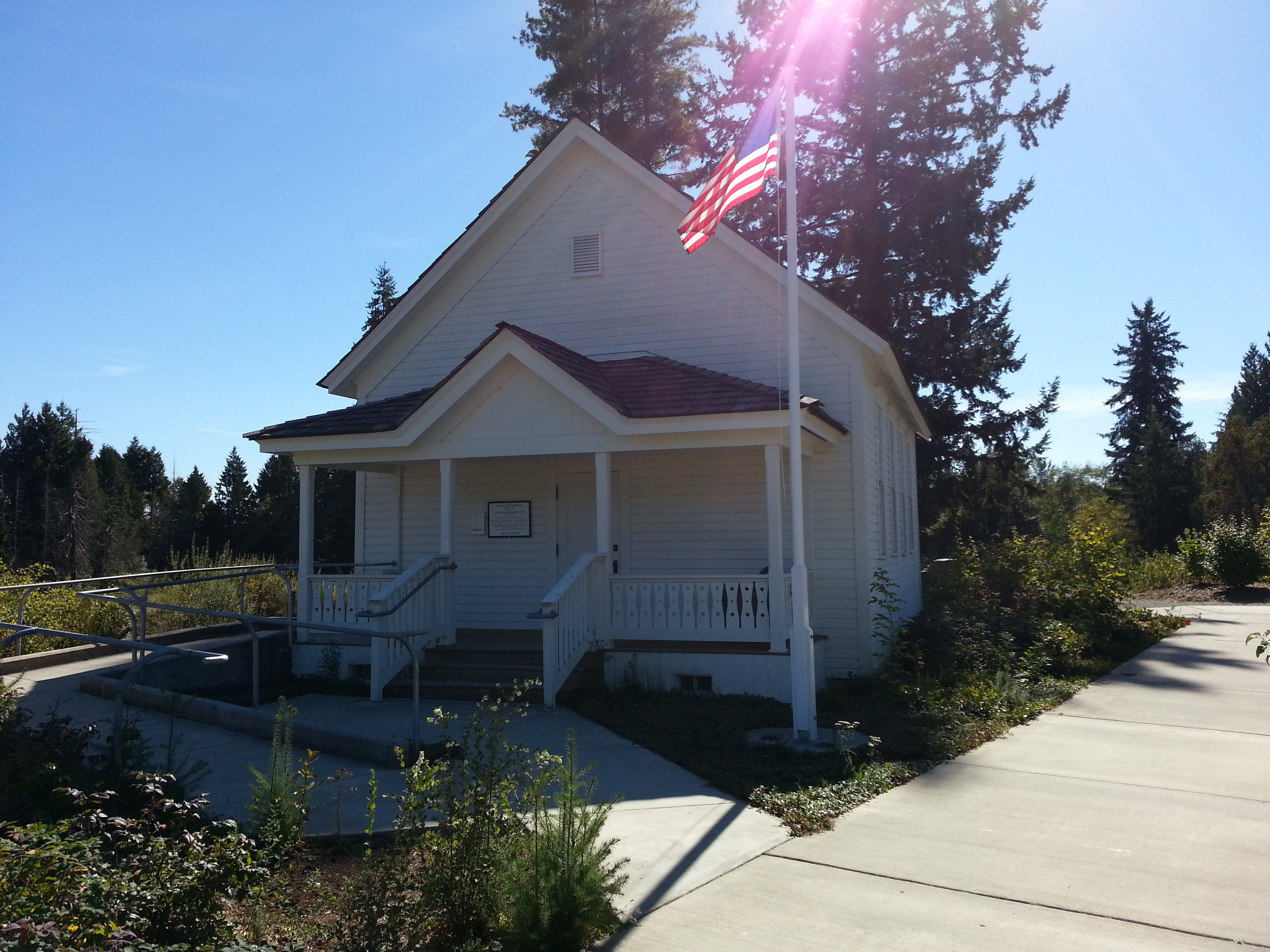

- Location within Washington (state) Location within the United States
- Location: 1129 208th Street SE, Bothell, Washington
- Coordinates: 47°48′31″N 122°13′02″W
- Area: less than one acre
- Built: 1902
- Architectural style: One-room schoolhouse
- NRHP reference No.: 94000406
- Added to NRHP: May 19, 1994

North Creek School is a school building located in Bothell, Washington listed on the National Register of Historic Places. Built in 1902, it served as a school for 18 years. The first teacher was Edgar Turner, who homesteaded at the present Turner's Corner (Highway 9 and Maltby Road intersection). Another of the school's teachers was Charles V. Beardslee, who came to the Bothell area in the late 1880s. After closing in 1920, it served as a meeting location for the Canyon Park Community Club until about 1950. It was then used for storage for many years, deteriorating from lack of use and nonattendance.

Originally located on the northwest corner of 31st Avenue S.E. and 228th Street S.E., about one mile east of Canyon Park Shopping Center, in 2008 the schoolhouse was moved to Centennial Park at 1129 208th Street SE.

== See also ==
- National Register of Historic Places listings in Snohomish County, Washington
