= Community Center and War Memorial Building =

- U.S. National Register of Historic Places
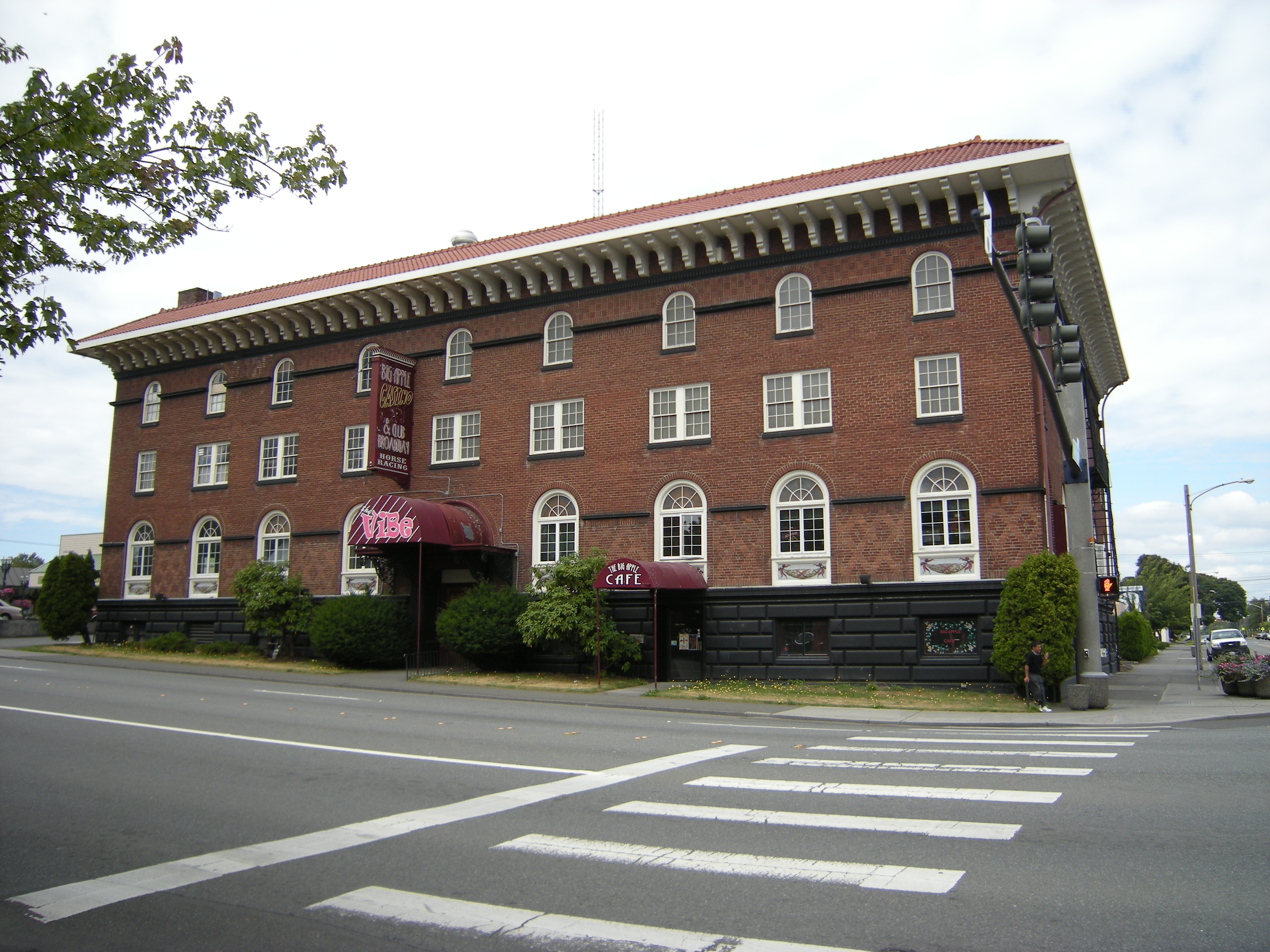

- Location within Washington (state)
- Location: 1611 Everett Ave., Everett, Washington
- Coordinates: 47°58′56″N 122°12′22″W
- Area: less than one acre
- NRHP reference No.: 79002554
- Added to NRHP: February 26, 1979

The Community Center and War Memorial Building is a building located in Everett, Washington listed on the National Register of Historic Places. Built by the Knights of Columbus in 1921, it was designed by Tacoma architects Charles Lundberg and C. Frank Mahon.

== See also ==
- National Register of Historic Places listings in Snohomish County, Washington
