= Marysville Opera House =

- U.S. National Register of Historic Places
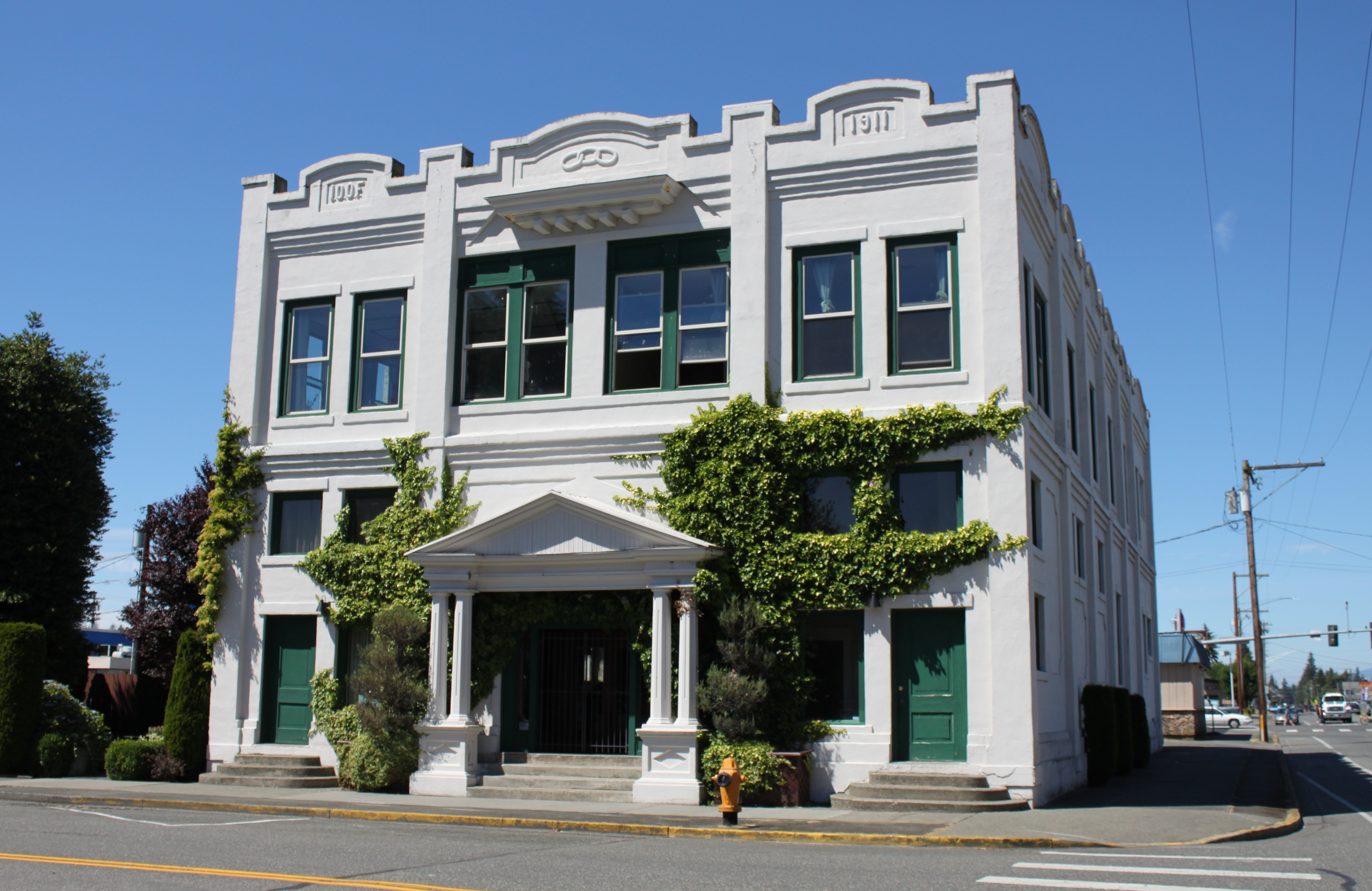
- Location: 1225 3rd Street; Marysville, Washington
- Coordinates: 48°03′04″N 122°10′51″W
- Built: 1911
- Architect: A. E. Heider
- NRHP reference No.: 82004288
- Added to NRHP: February 25, 1982

The Marysville Opera House, located in Marysville, Washington, is a performance hall and meetinghouse constructed in 1911. It was added to the National Register of Historic Places in 1982. It seats approximately 200 people.

== History ==
The opera house's predecessor, a simple meetinghouse and community space, was built in 1898 by the Marysville chapter of the Independent Order of Oddfellows. The wooden building was destroyed in a fire in 1910, and it was decided shortly thereafter to build a replacement venue out of another material.

The new opera house was built the following year by local contractor A.E. Heider, at a cost of $20,000 (equivalent to $691,000 in 2025). The cornerstone was laid on March 26 and construction was finished by August 1911. The new building was designed to grow with the city and serve social functions as well as traveling shows. It was the second known structure in Snohomish County, Washington to use poured concrete, rather than timber or masonry, in its construction.

The Oddfellows' Marysville lodge was disbanded in 1966, and the opera house later served as a roller skating rink, shooting range, furniture store, and a disco nightclub over the next two decades. The Marysville Fine Arts Committee successfully placed the building on the National Register of Historic Places in 1982 as the city's only entry, and hoped to restore the building but were unable to raise enough money to do so. The city of Marysville began leasing the opera house from the Williams family in 1998, who renovated the building after years of neglect left the building with a leaking roof. It reopened in March 2001, allowing the city to rent it out for private events.

A second renovation in 2016 included the repainting of the building, installation of LED lighting, and new artwork. In 2017, it hosted 138 events. The city government purchased the Opera House in January 2018 for $1.44 million, aiming to continue booking events while revitalizing the surrounding riverfront area.

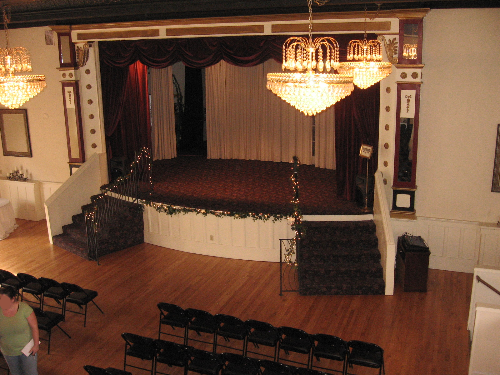
The main stage inside the Marysville Opera House

== See also ==
- National Register of Historic Places listings in Snohomish County, Washington
