= Swalwell Cottage =

Historic house in Washington, United States

- U.S. National Register of Historic Places
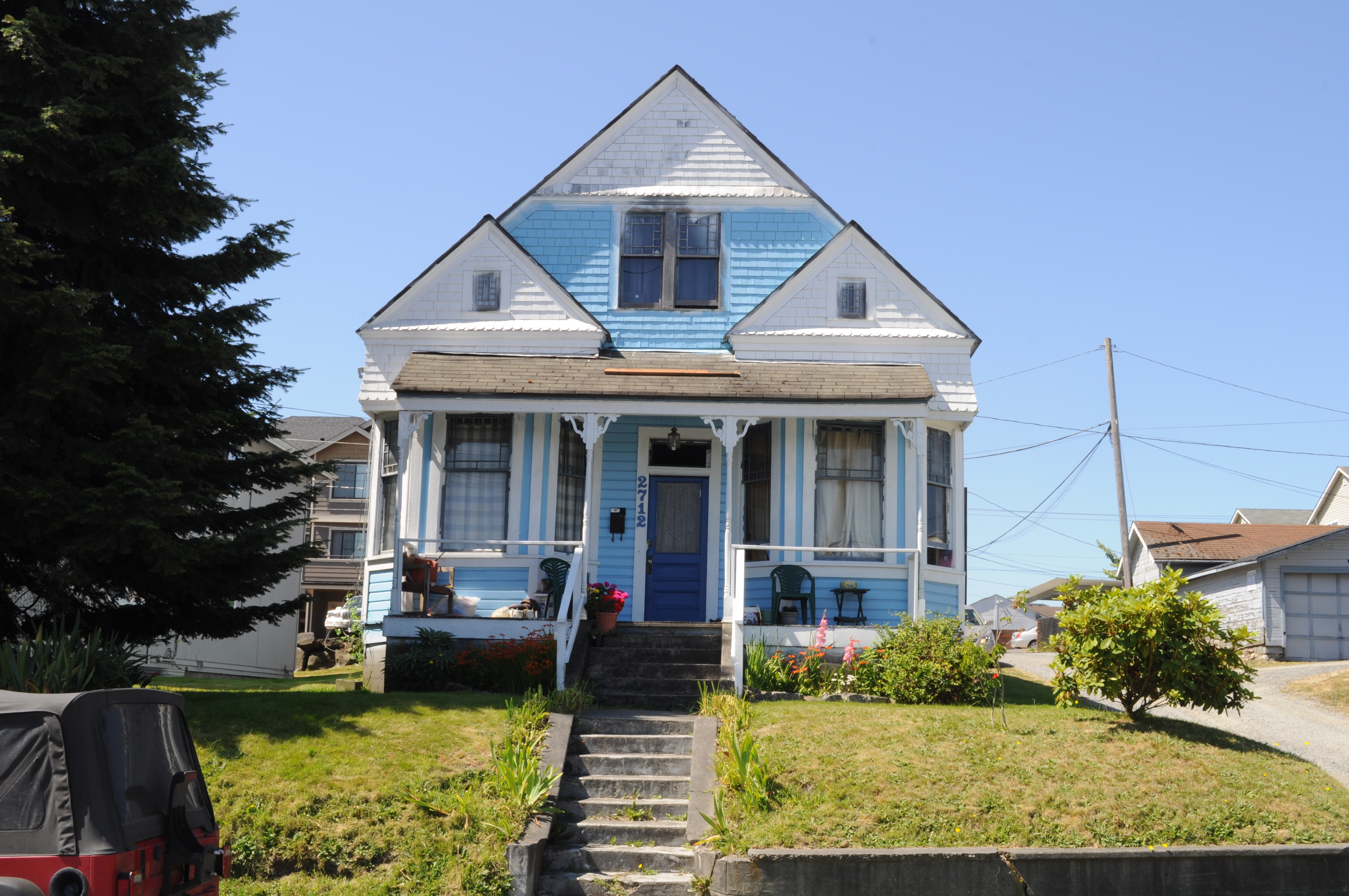
- Front of building in 2009

- Location within Washington (state) Location within the United States
- Location: 2712 Pine St. Everett, Washington
- Coordinates: 47°58′53″N 122°11′29″W
- Area: less than 1 acre (0.40 ha)
- Built: 1891–1892
- Built by: Alfred Swalwell
- Architect: Frederick Sexton
- Architectural style: Stick–Eastlake, Shingle
- NRHP reference No.: 78002773
- Added to NRHP: 28 November 1978

Swalwell Cottage is a historic house located at 2712 Pine Street in Everett, Washington.

== Description and history ==
The 1 1/2-story wood-frame cottage fronts on Pine St. Designed by Everett architect Frederick A. Sexton, it combines elements of the Stick–Eastlake and Shingle architectural styles. Sexton came to the Everett town site in 1891 and became essentially the architect for the eastern side of town. He went on build the first brick building in town.

Built in the winter of 1891–1892, the cottage was the home of Alfred W. Swalwell. Swalwell's parents and his brothers were active investors and developers in Everett, starting during a land boom based on speculation that the railroad would reach the coast in the area. The Swalwells filed the plat for their a few months before John D. Rockefeller's group filed their plat for the town of Everett. As investors could not yet buy land in the unfiled plat, a rush ensued, and the Swalwells did as much business in a day as the US$150,000 (equivalent to $5,375,000 in 2025) worth of real estate sold the day the plat the cottage is in went on sale. Alfred Swalwell built the cottage and later sold the property to his brother, who lost it in a mortgage foreclosure after the Silver Panic of 1893. Pine St. was Swalwell Avenue at the time of construction. The cottage is one of the oldest residences in the city, possibly the only to retain its architectural character. It was listed on the National Register of Historic Places on November 28, 1978.

== See also ==
- National Register of Historic Places listings in Snohomish County, Washington
