= Roland Hartley House =

Historic house in Washington, United States

- U.S. National Register of Historic Places
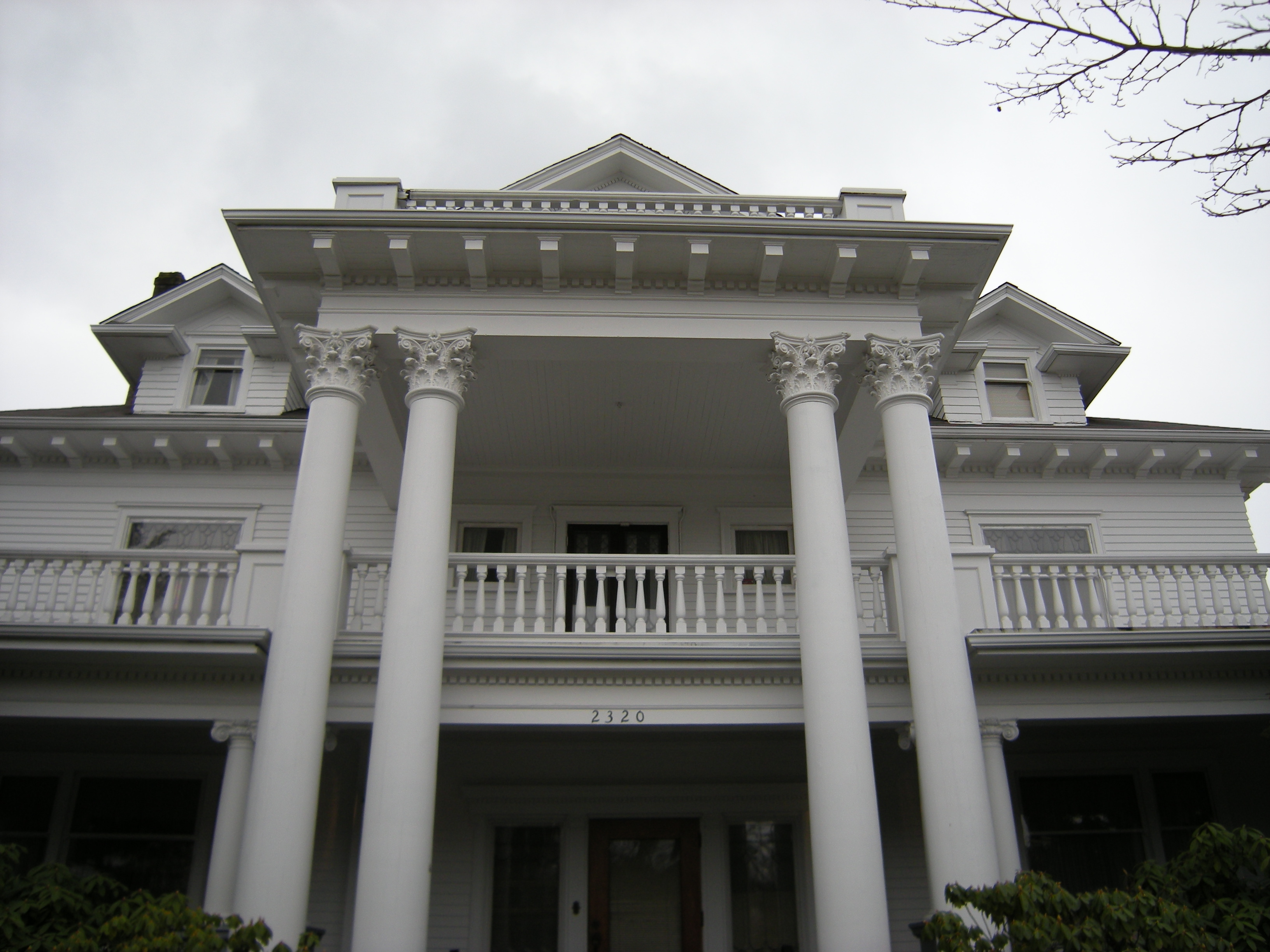
- Front of house in 2009

- Location within Washington (state) Location within the United States
- Location: 2320 Rucker Ave., Everett, Washington
- Coordinates: 47°59′12″N 122°12′37″W
- Area: less than 1 acre (0.40 ha)
- Built: 1910
- Architectural style: Classical Revival
- NRHP reference No.: 86000958
- Added to NRHP: 2 May 1986

The Roland Hartley House is a historic house located at 2320 Rucker Avenue in Everett, Washington.

== Description and history ==
Built in 1910 the house reflects the Classical Revival architectural style. It was the home of Washington Governor Roland H. Hartley. It was listed on the National Register of Historic Places on May 2, 1986.

== Photo gallery ==
Photographs of the Roland Hartley House
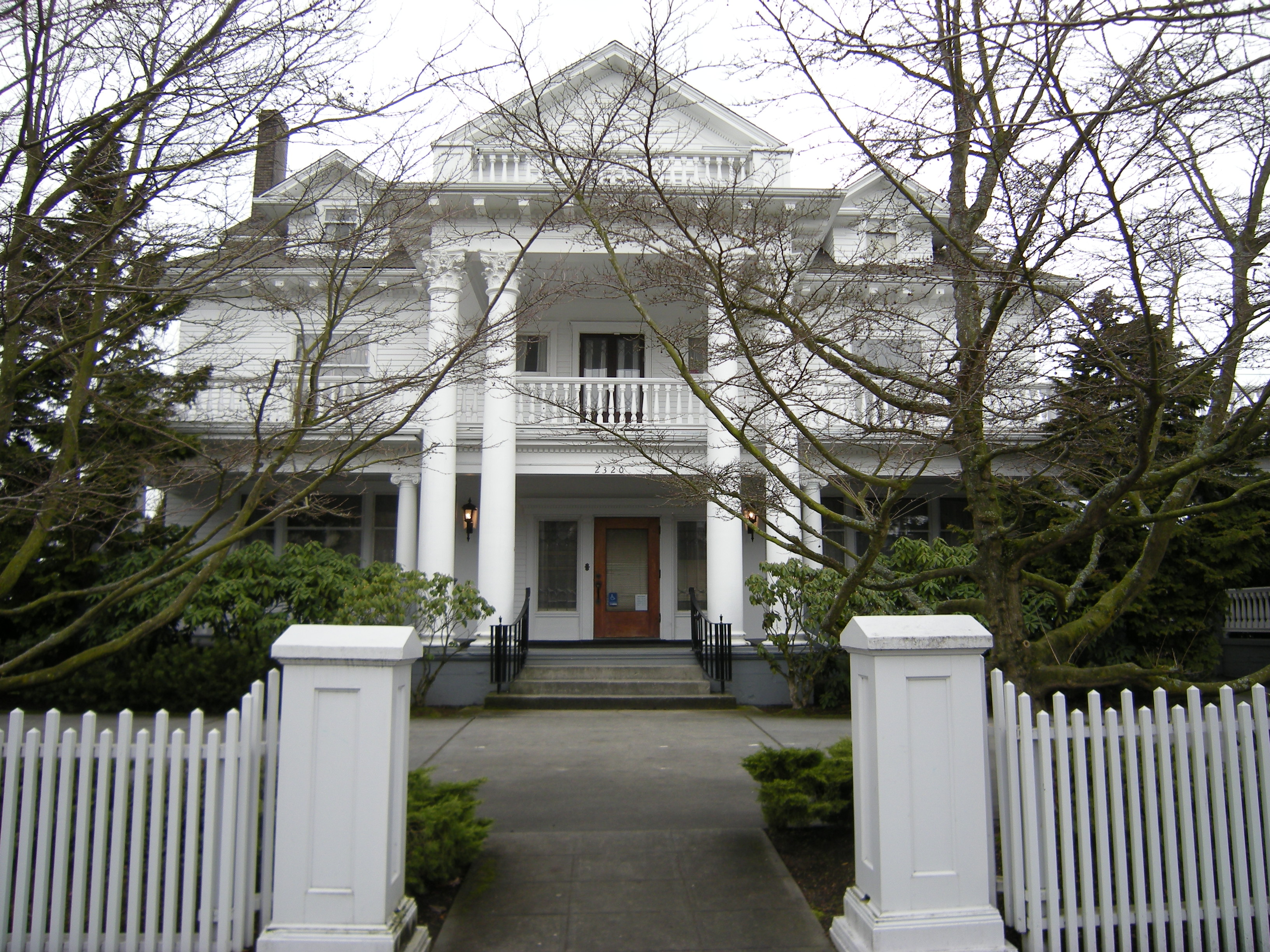
Facade, east elevation, in 2009

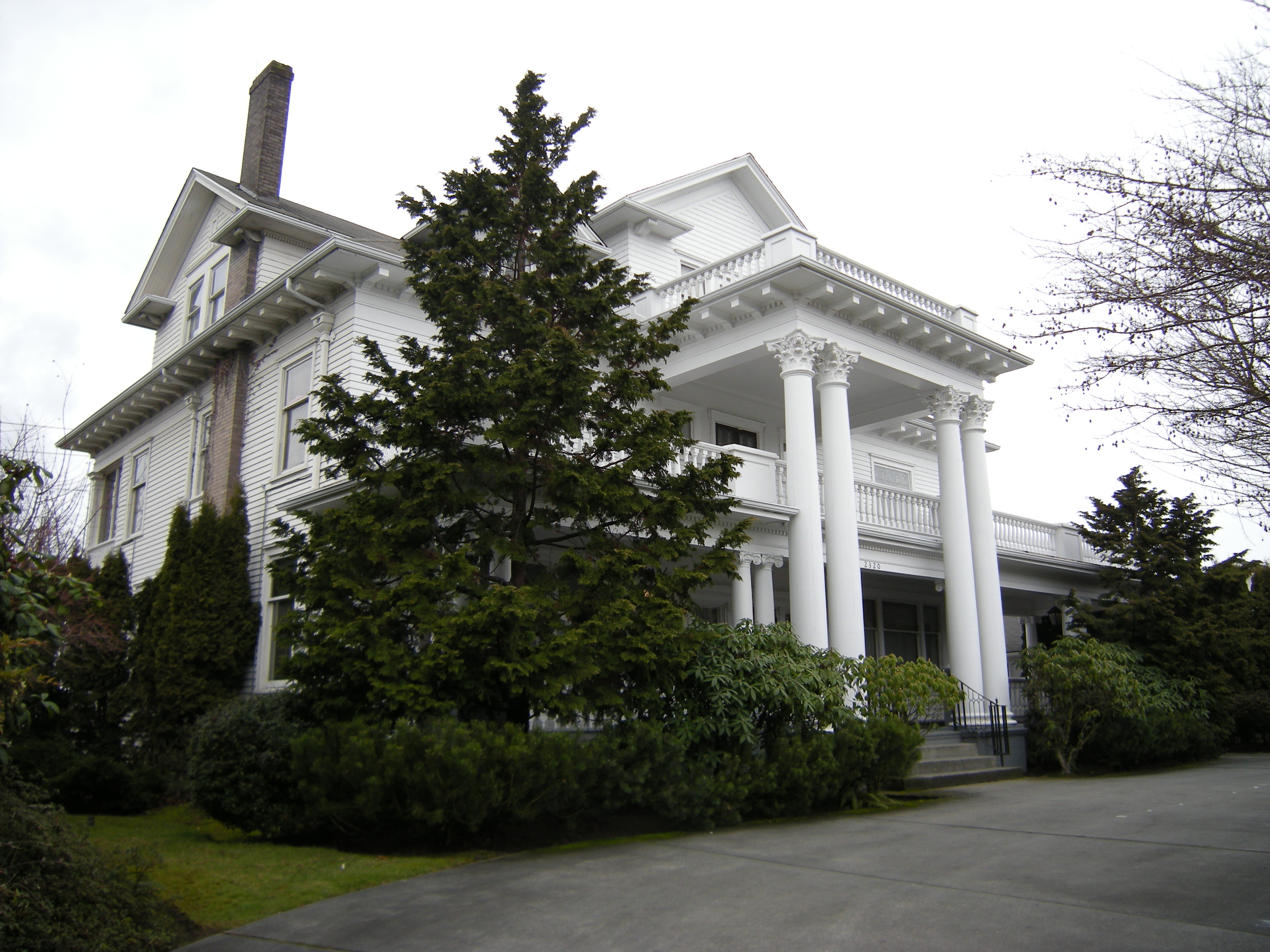
Facade and south elevation in 2009

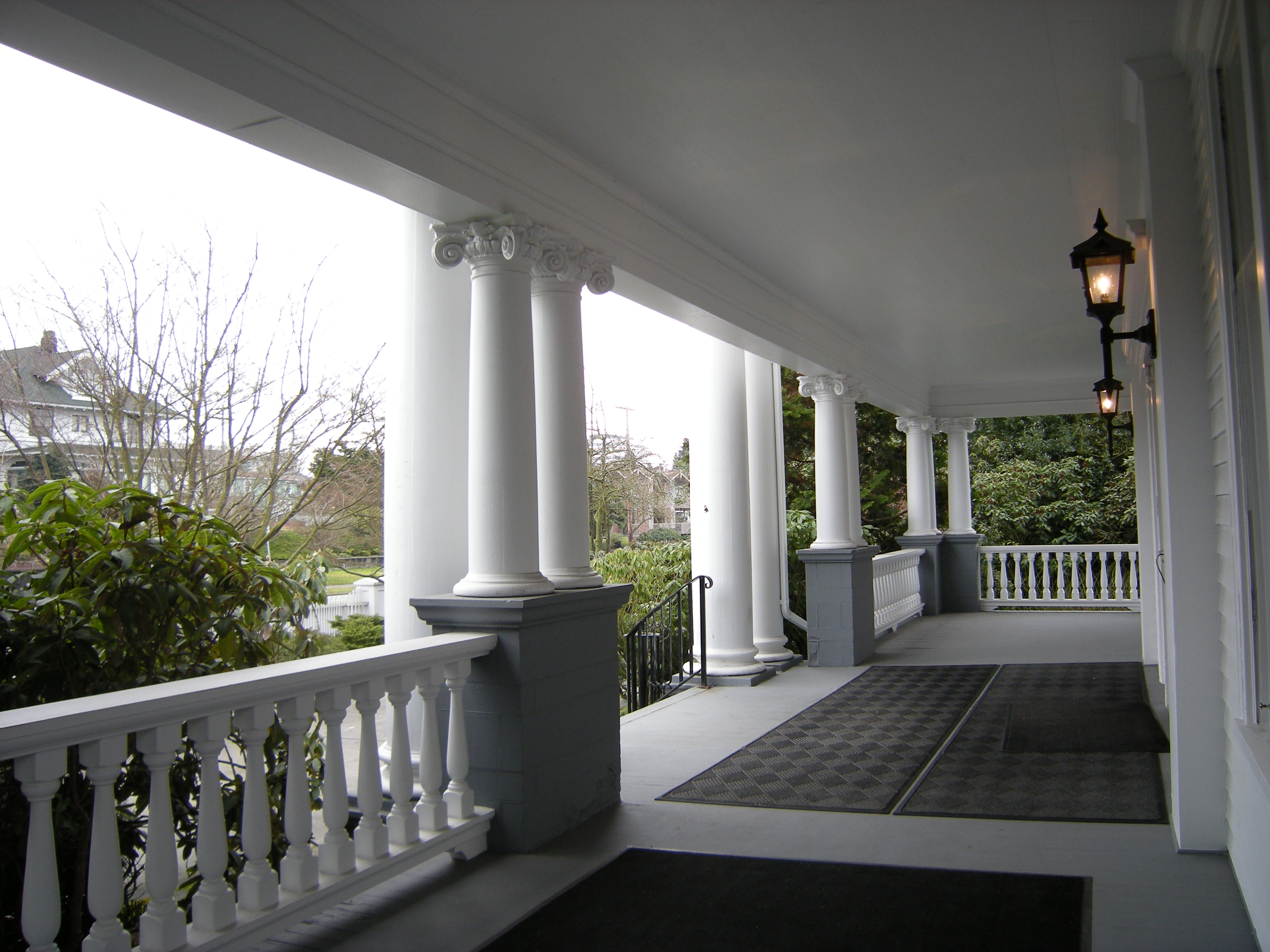
Front porch in 2009

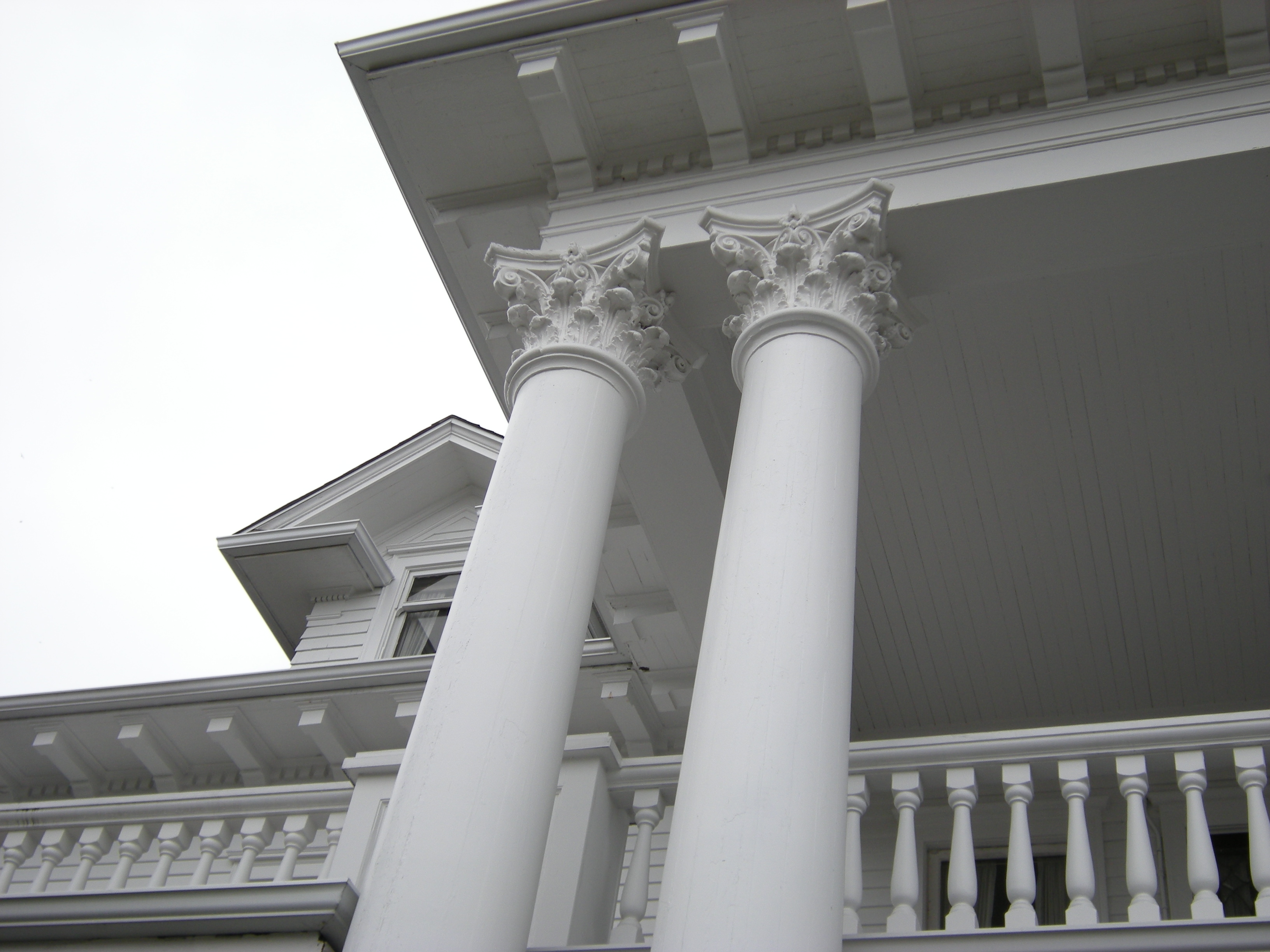
Column detail in 2009

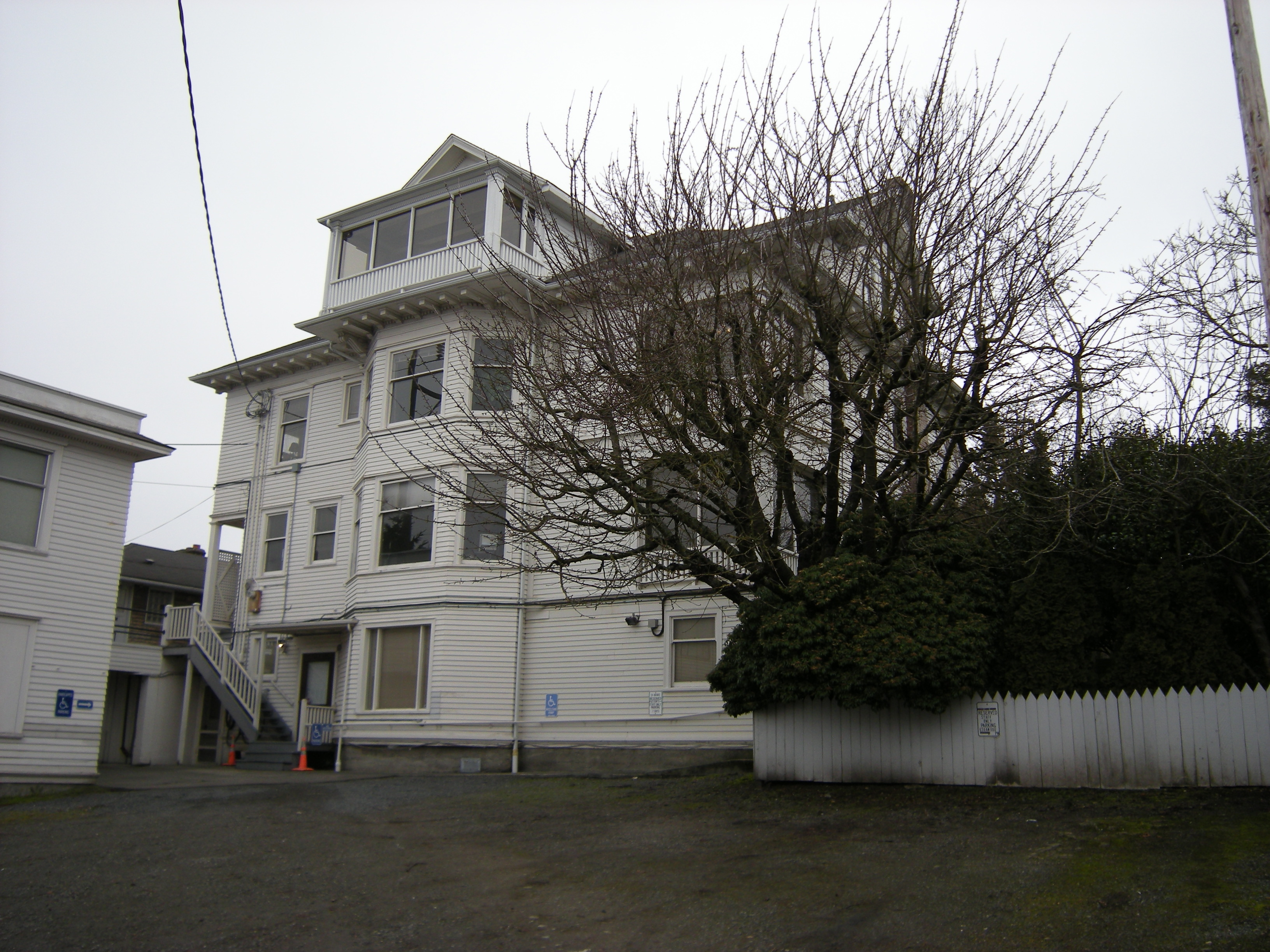
Rear, west elevation in 2009
Photography: Joe Mabel 2009

== See also ==
- National Register of Historic Places listings in Snohomish County, Washington
