= Chamber of Commerce Building (Terre Haute, Indiana) =

Historic building in Indiana, United States

- Formerly listed on the U.S. National Register of Historic Places
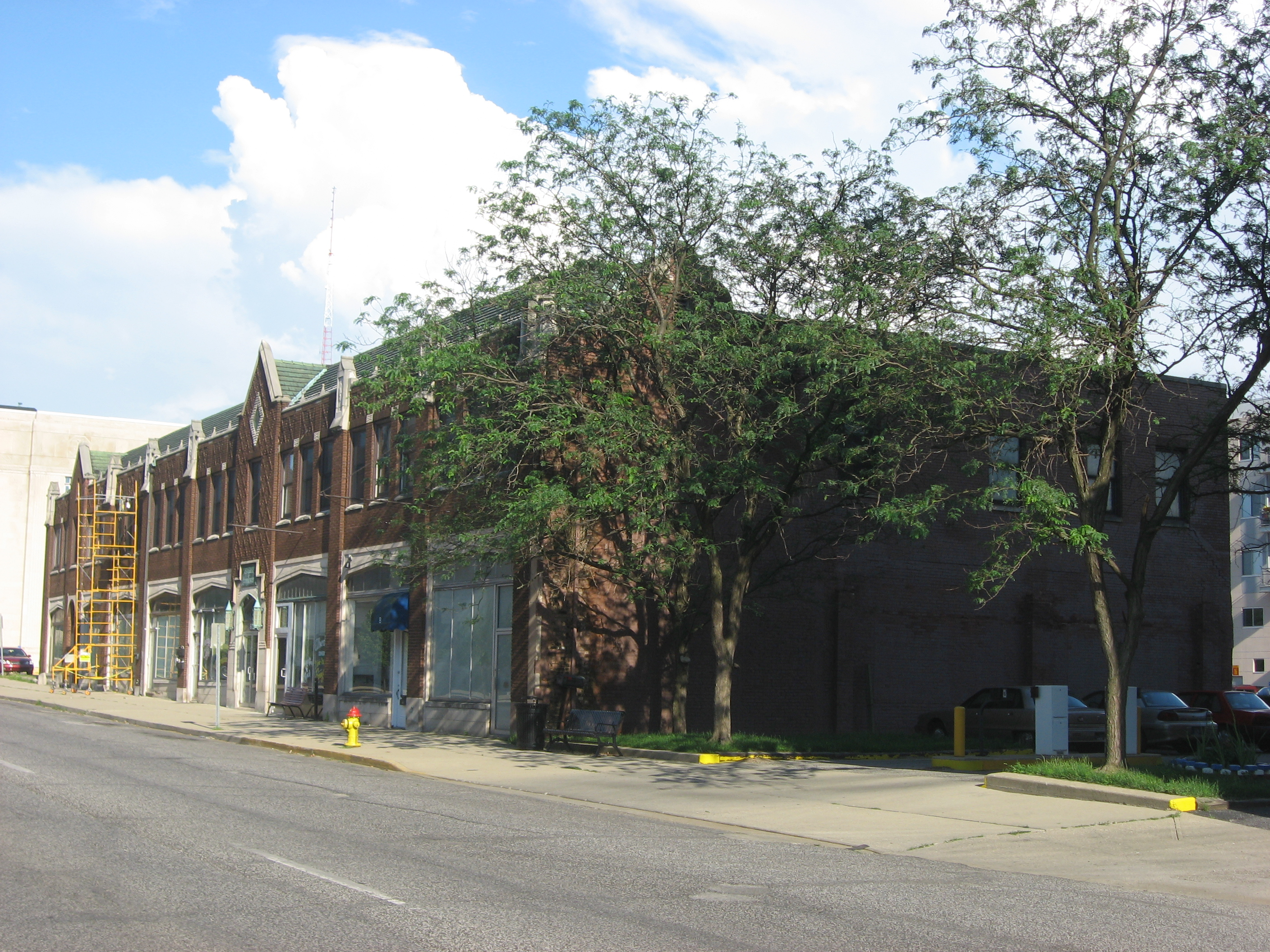
- Chamber of Commerce Building, July 2011

- Location within Vigo County, Indiana Location within Indiana Location within the United States
- Location: 329-333 Walnut St., Terre Haute, Indiana
- Coordinates: 39°28′2″N 87°24′31″W
- Area: less than one acre
- Built: 1925
- Architectural style: Tudor Revival
- MPS: Downtown Terre Haute MRA
- NRHP reference No.: 83000155

Significant dates
- Added to NRHP: June 30, 1983
- Removed from NRHP: March 5, 2019

Chamber of Commerce Building is a historic commercial building located in Terre Haute, Indiana, United States. It was built in 1925. It is a two-story, rectangular, Tudor Revival-style brown brick building. It features limestone detailing, a green tile facade roof, and an arcade of Tudor arches.

The building was listed on the National Register of Historic Places in 1983, and was delisted in 2019.
