= Commerce Building (Everett, Washington) =

Historic place in Washington, United States

- U.S. National Register of Historic Places
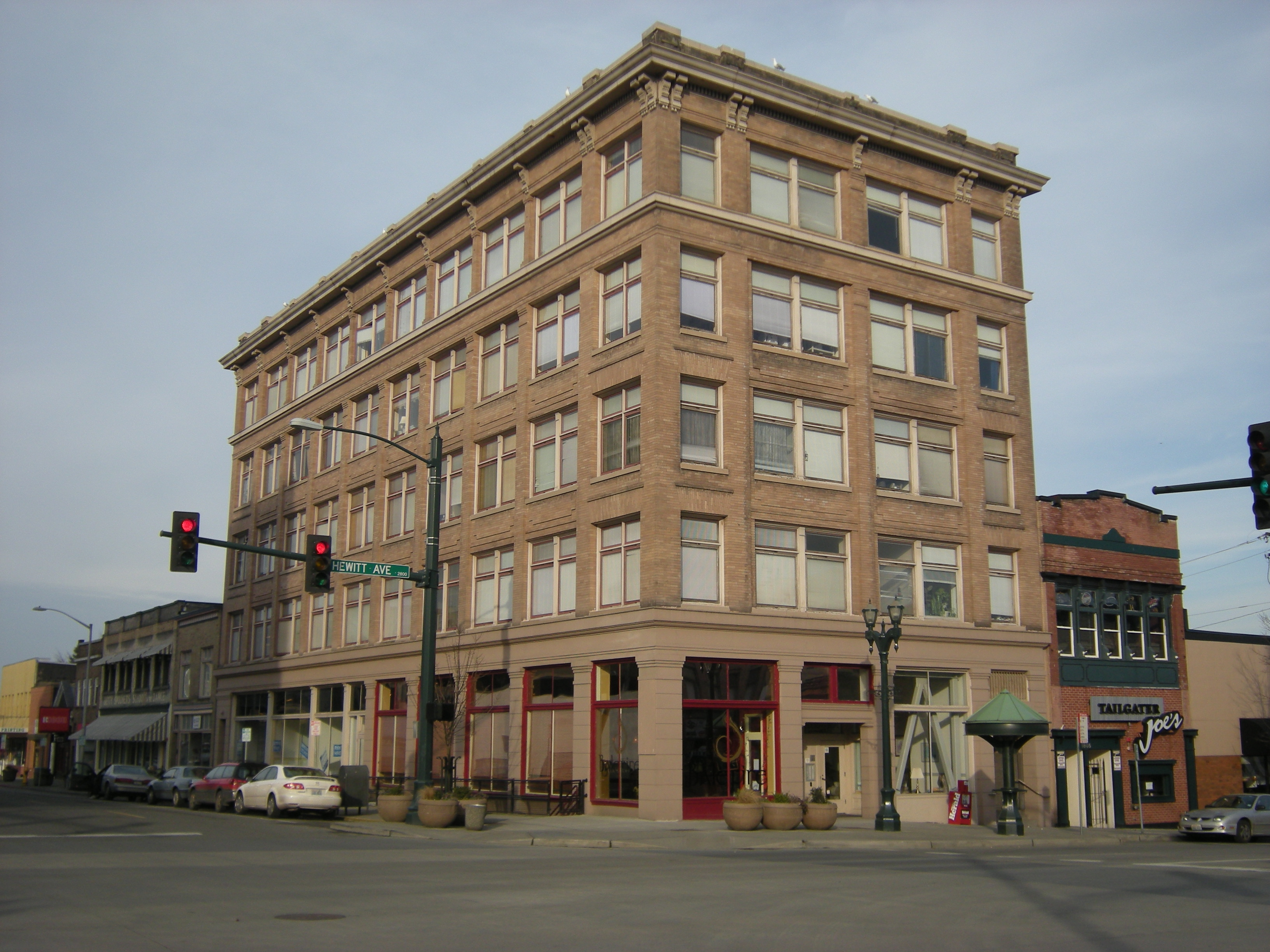

- Location within Washington (state)
- Location: 1801 Hewitt Ave., Everett, Washington
- Coordinates: 47°58′47″N 122°12′16″W
- Area: Less than one acre
- Built: 1910
- Architect: Turnbull, Benjamin Franklin
- Architectural style: Early 20th-century commercial
- NRHP reference No.: 92001290
- Added to NRHP: October 1, 1992

The Commerce Building is a building located in Everett, Washington, listed on the National Register of Historic Places and included in the Hewitt Avenue Historic District. The five-story structure was built in 1910 at a cost of $100,000. The building was designed by noted local architect Benjamin Franklin Turnbull who was responsible for several other commercial buildings in Everett as well as numerous residential structures. Turnbull's office was located in the building from 1910 until 1927, when his career in Everett drew to a close. Office spaces predominated on the building's second through fourth floors, while the top floor was occupied by the Everett Business School. The building was vacant at the time of its nomination to the National Register in 1992. Beginning in 1993, it became an affordable housing community with 48 assisted studio rental units. It is managed by the non-profit organization Housing Hope.

== See also ==
- National Register of Historic Places listings in Snohomish County, Washington
