= Commerce Building (Saint Paul, Minnesota) =

- U.S. National Register of Historic Places
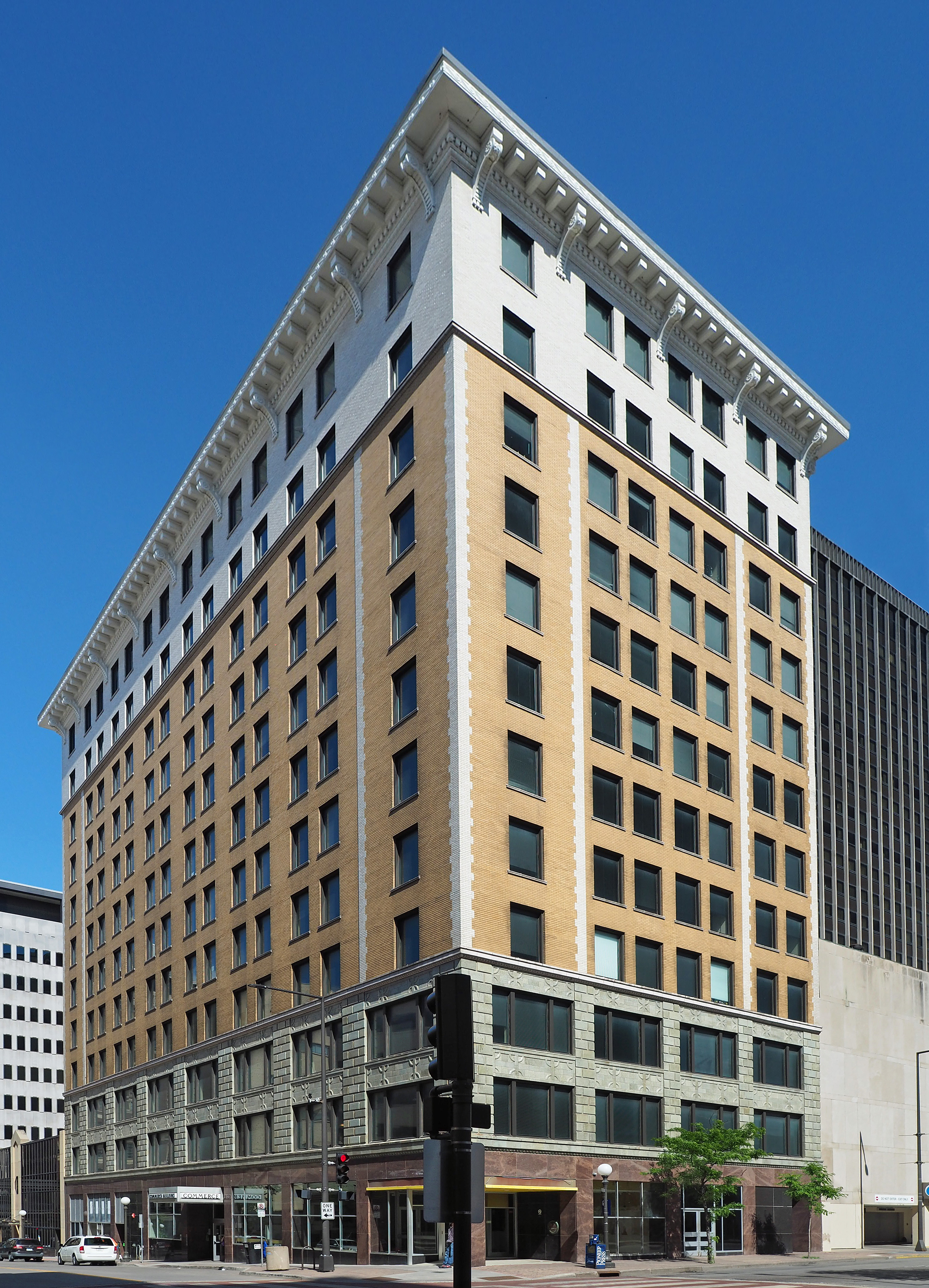
- The Commerce Building from the west

- Location within Minnesota Location within the United States
- Location: 10 East 4th Street, Saint Paul, Minnesota
- Coordinates: 44°56′41.5″N 93°5′36″W
- Area: Less than one acre
- Built: 1912
- Built by: Hermann Kretz
- Architectural style: Early Commercial
- NRHP reference No.: 07000645
- Designated: July 3, 2007

The Commerce Building is a 12-story office building in downtown Saint Paul, Minnesota, United States, built in 1912. It served as headquarters for two commerce associations from 1912 to 1921. It is now a mixed-use commercial, office, and residential building. It was listed on the National Register of Historic Places in 2007 for its local significance in the theme of commerce. It was nominated for its association with the business networking organizations that influenced Saint Paul's late-19th and early-20th-century economic and civic growth.

== History ==
The Commerce Building was originally built to house the Commercial Club of St. Paul and the offices of the St. Paul Association of Commerce. Years later, it reflects the economic strength and civic influence of Saint Paul's business organizations at the beginning of the 20th century. The Commerce Building is typical of buildings designed to house commercial and civic groups as well as private tenants.

Most large American cities had at least one commercial organization by the 1880s. By the turn of the 20th century, terms such as "Board of Trade," "Commercial Club," and "Chamber of Commerce" were common. These organizations sought to strengthen the economic and civic life of their cities. They supported civic reforms and opposed taxes. They also developed local retail trade, attracted new industries, and exposed transportation problems. When possible, they advertised their cities as convention locations. Saint Paul led Minnesota in developing business associations.

The St. Paul Commercial Club incorporated in 1891. It opened offices in the Germania Life Insurance Building. The club's success was almost immediate, and it played an important role in the city's commerce.

Commercial Club members announced their intention to build a new headquarters in 1909. Club member and architect Hermann Kretz was chosen to design the new building. Not only was a centralized building desired, but also a consolidated organization. Many local existing business associations had overlapping aims. In 1911 the Commercial Club and several other groups merged to form the St. Paul Association of Commerce. The Commercial Club still continued to function as an independent association after the merger. Construction of what was first known as the Commercial Building and later as the Commerce Building began in April 1911. The period between 1880 and 1920 saw the addition of many new building types to downtown Saint Paul. The most significant was the tall office building built on a steel or concrete skeleton. The office building expressed the growing separation of production and office work. Companies needed more office space and wanted buildings that would convey financial strength.

The Commerce Building was created on the model of the office building or skyscraper. Its design used the Ransome slab and Turner mushroom systems of concrete construction. Such reinforced concrete construction may have allowed for the rapid completion of the building. It was prepared for interior finishes by October 1911. The interior featured offices and clubrooms on the upper two levels. Terrazzo floors were installed throughout the building along with concrete mushroom columns. The building cost an estimated $250,000 to build.

The grand opening of the Commercial Club was on September 9, 1912. It began with the Town Criers' band leading two hundred members from the old headquarters to the new. Saint Paul Mayor Herbert P. Keller and Bishop John Jeremiah Lawler spoke at the opening dinner. The event was followed by a week of festivities around the new quarters.

The Association grew over the years and played a key role in the business sector of Minnesota. As labor unions gained strength, rich industrialists saw a need to capture middle-class support. Thus the 1920s saw Saint Paul's business associations expand their roles in labor, women's organizations, and charitable organizations. The depressions of 1921–1923 and 1929–1933 weakened businesses and office rentals throughout the country. The Commerce Building's tenant losses during those years reflected the problems of the national economy. When the ten-year lease agreement at the Commerce Building ended in 1921, the St. Paul Association of Commerce moved to another building and the Commercial Club dissolved. Another company moved into the former quarters of the Commercial Club.

Construction slowed in downtown Saint Paul in the 1930s and 1940s due to the Great Depression and World War II. Many 19th-century buildings were torn down or vacated. Between 1930 and 1945 Saint Paul lost many landmarks, but the Commerce Building survived. It also escaped the urban renewal projects that destroyed many of Saint Paul's downtown office buildings in the 1950s. In 2008 the Commerce Building was converted into apartment units.

The Commerce Building is a symbol of the early-twentieth-century success of Saint Paul's business and civic organizations. The St. Paul Commercial Club and St. Paul Association of Commerce were among the first in the country to merge their organizations into a single building. These groups' support for the city's economy reached all aspects of business as well as city planning and the development of charities.

== See also ==
- National Register of Historic Places listings in Ramsey County, Minnesota
