= McCabe Building (Everett, Washington) =

- U.S. National Register of Historic Places
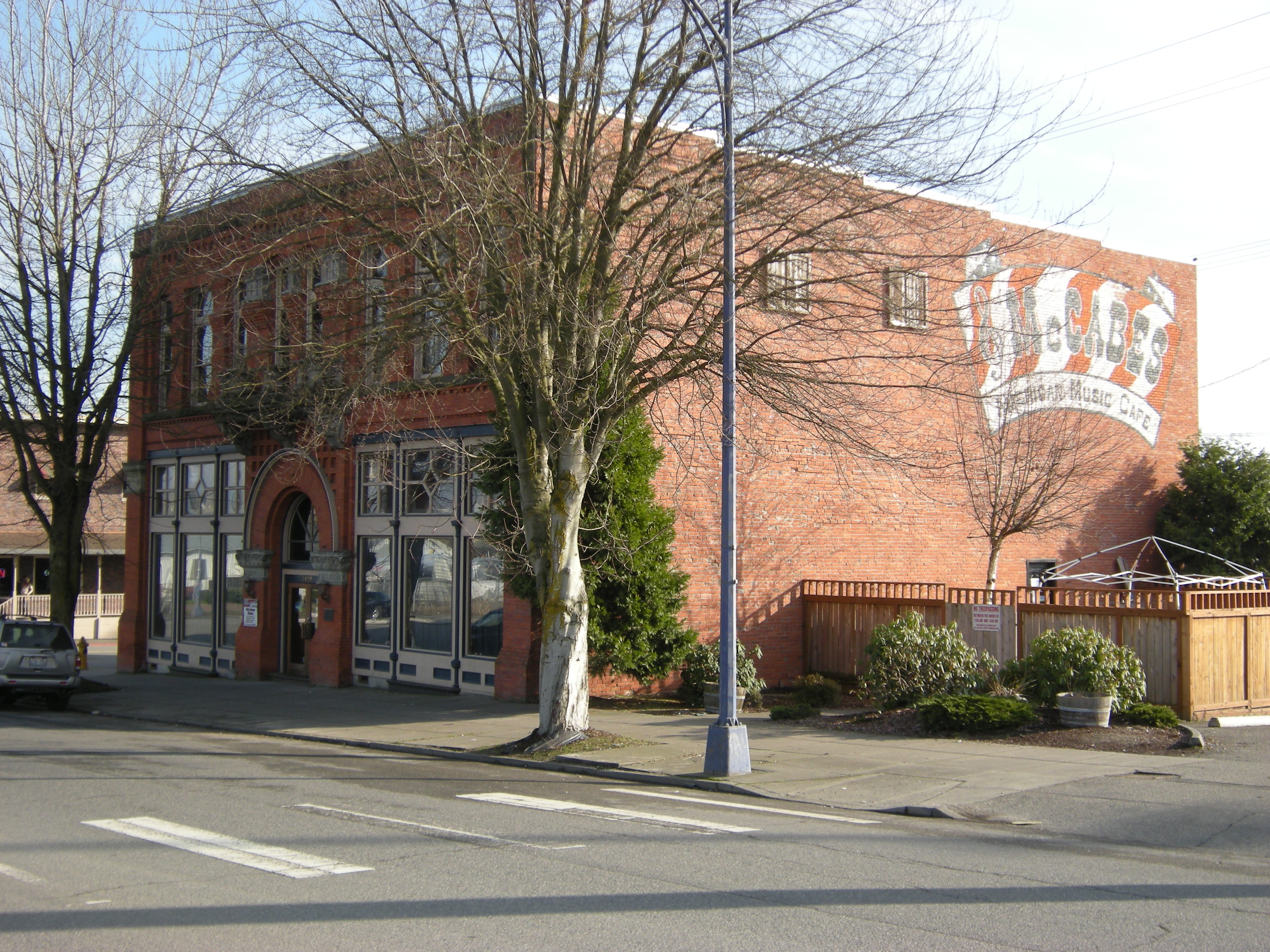

- Location within Washington (state)
- Location: 3120 Hewitt Ave., Everett, Washington
- Coordinates: 47°58′44″N 122°11′15″W
- Area: less than one acre
- Built: 1892
- Architect: Frederick A. Sexton
- Architectural style: Richardsonian Romanesque
- NRHP reference No.: 77001359
- Added to NRHP: October 21, 1977

The McCabe Building is a historic commercial building located at 3120 Hewitt Avenue in Everett, Washington. The two-story brick structure was completed in 1892 and was listed on the National Register of Historic Places on October 21, 1977.

== See also ==
- National Register of Historic Places listings in Snohomish County, Washington
