= Old Masonic Hall (Louisville, Mississippi) =

- U.S. National Register of Historic Places
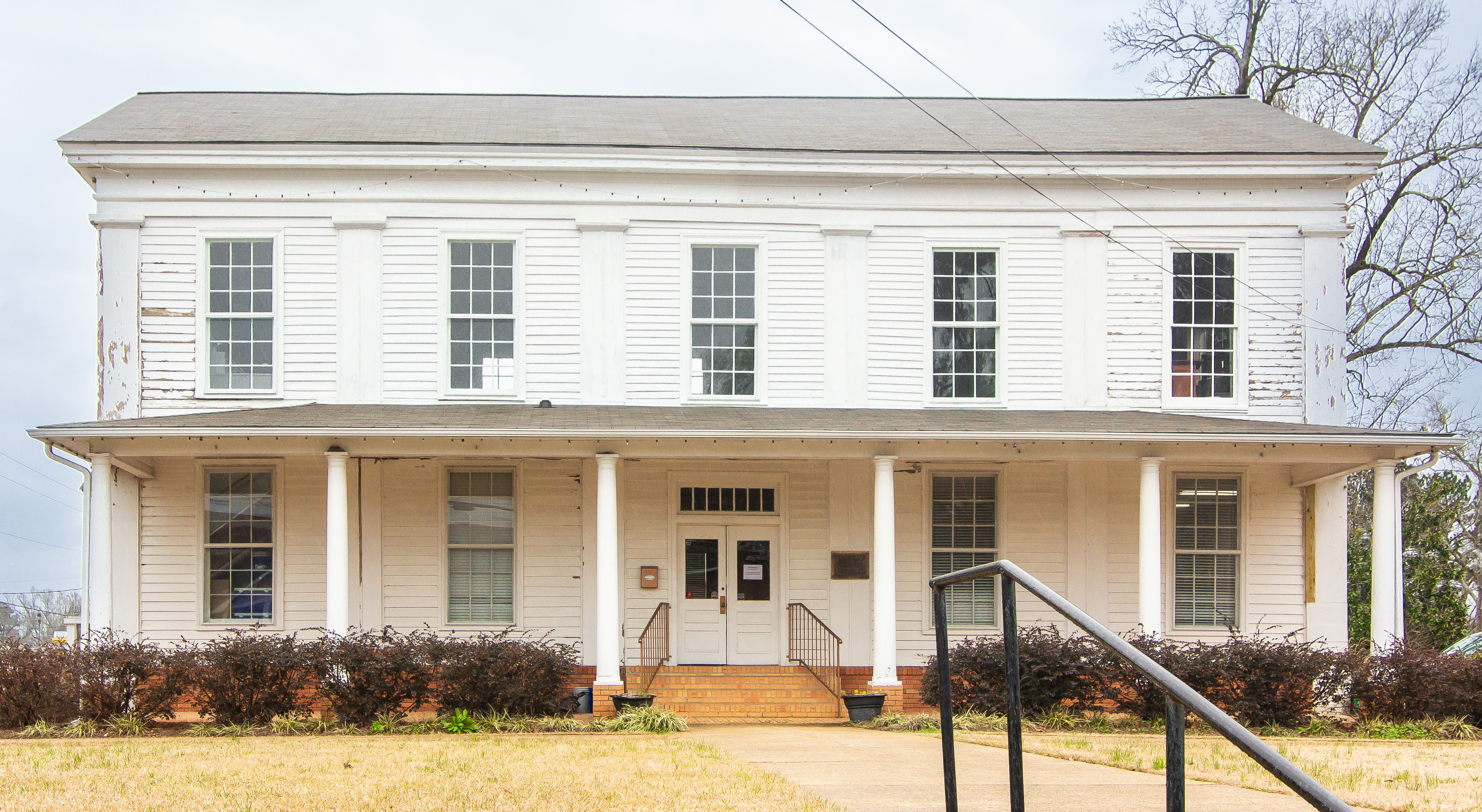

- Location within Mississippi Location within the United States
- Location: 311 W. Park St., Louisville, Mississippi
- Coordinates: 33°7′19″N 89°3′22″W
- Area: less than one acre
- Built: 1851
- Architect: Smyth, Samuel Washington
- Architectural style: Greek Revival
- NRHP reference No.: 94000065
- Added to NRHP: February 25, 1994

The Old Masonic Hall in Louisville, Mississippi, also known as Community House, and as Chamber of Commerce, is a historic building built in 1851. It was listed on the National Register of Historic Places in 1994 and was designated a Mississippi Landmark in 2007. It is a notable example of Greek Revival style architecture.

The building was constructed by Louisville Lodge No. 75 (a local Masonic lodge). Originally, the upper floor was used as a meeting hall for the lodge, while the lower floor housed the Masonic Female Institute. The lower floor was subsequently used as school and a community center. In 1922 the Masons moved to a new location, and the building was sold to the City of Louisville. Since 1958 it has housed the local Chamber of Commerce.
