= Chamber of Commerce Building (Greenville, South Carolina) =

Historic building in South Carolina, US

- U.S. National Register of Historic Places
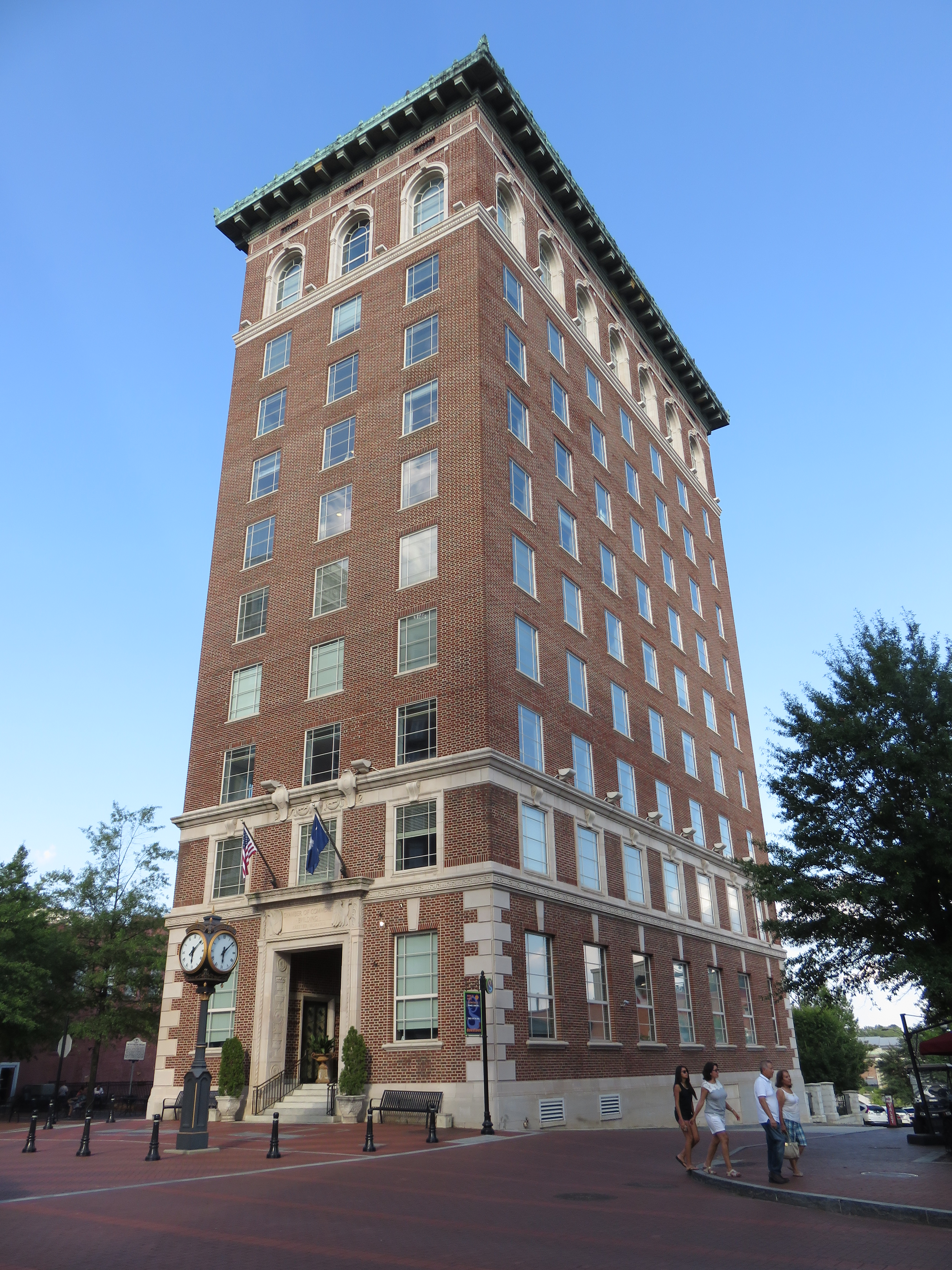

- Location within South Carolina Location within the United States
- Location: 135 S. Main St., Greenville, South Carolina
- Coordinates: 34°50′53″N 82°24′0″W
- Area: 0 acres (0 ha)
- Built: 1925
- Built by: J.E. Sirrine and Company
- Architect: Beacham and LeGrand
- Architectural style: Skyscraper
- MPS: Greenville MRA
- NRHP reference No.: 82003854
- Added to NRHP: July 1, 1982

Chamber of Commerce Building, also known as the North Greenville College Building, is a historic office building located at Greenville, South Carolina. It was built in 1925, and is a ten-story rectangular brick sheathed steel frame building. The Chicago School style skyscraper consists of a two-story base with Neoclassical detailing, a seven-story shaft, and a roof story that features tall arched windows and a brick and stone frieze with transoms and stone panels.

It was added to the National Register of Historic Places in 1982.
