= Lake Mary Chamber of Commerce Building =

- U.S. National Register of Historic Places
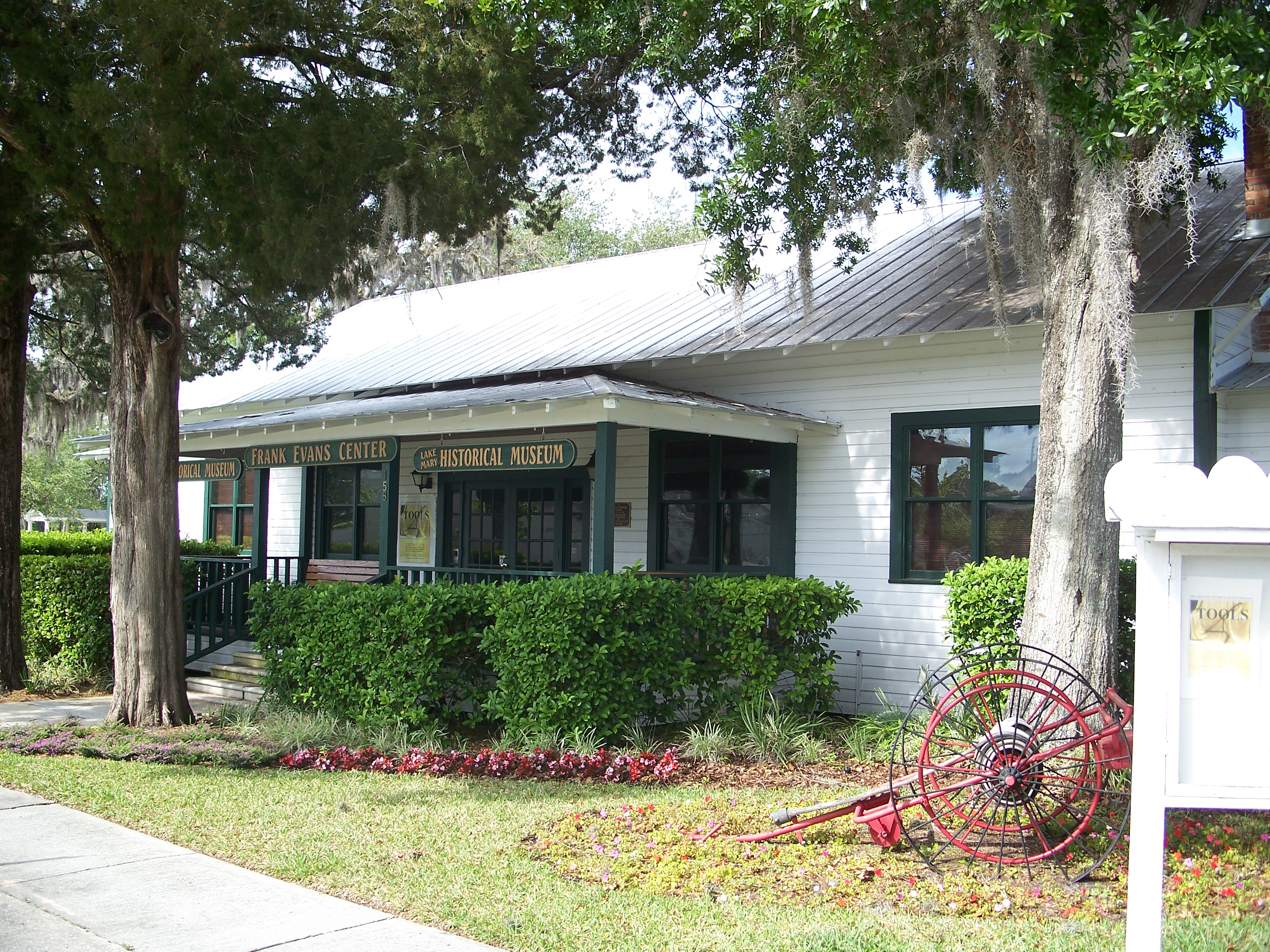

- Location within Florida Location within the United States
- Location: Lake Mary, Florida
- Coordinates: 28°45′29″N 81°19′21″W
- Built: 1926
- NRHP reference No.: 04000022
- Added to NRHP: February 11, 2004

The Lake Mary Chamber of Commerce Building (also known as the Frank Evans Center) is a historic site in Lake Mary, Florida, United States. It is located at 158 North Country Club Road. On February 11, 2004, it was added to the U.S. National Register of Historic Places. The building was built in 1926 by Frank Evans as a community center and offices for the Lake Mary of Chamber of Commerce. The building was later used as the City Hall when the city was incorporated in 1973 until 1990 when the current City Hall was completed.

The building currently functions as the Lake Mary Historical Museum. The museum began in 1994 in a small room at the back of the building while the rest of the building was used as a gathering place for the city's seniors The museum now occupies the entire building and includes changing exhibits about local history, art, culture and trains.
