= Port of Everett =

Public seaport authority in Washington, US

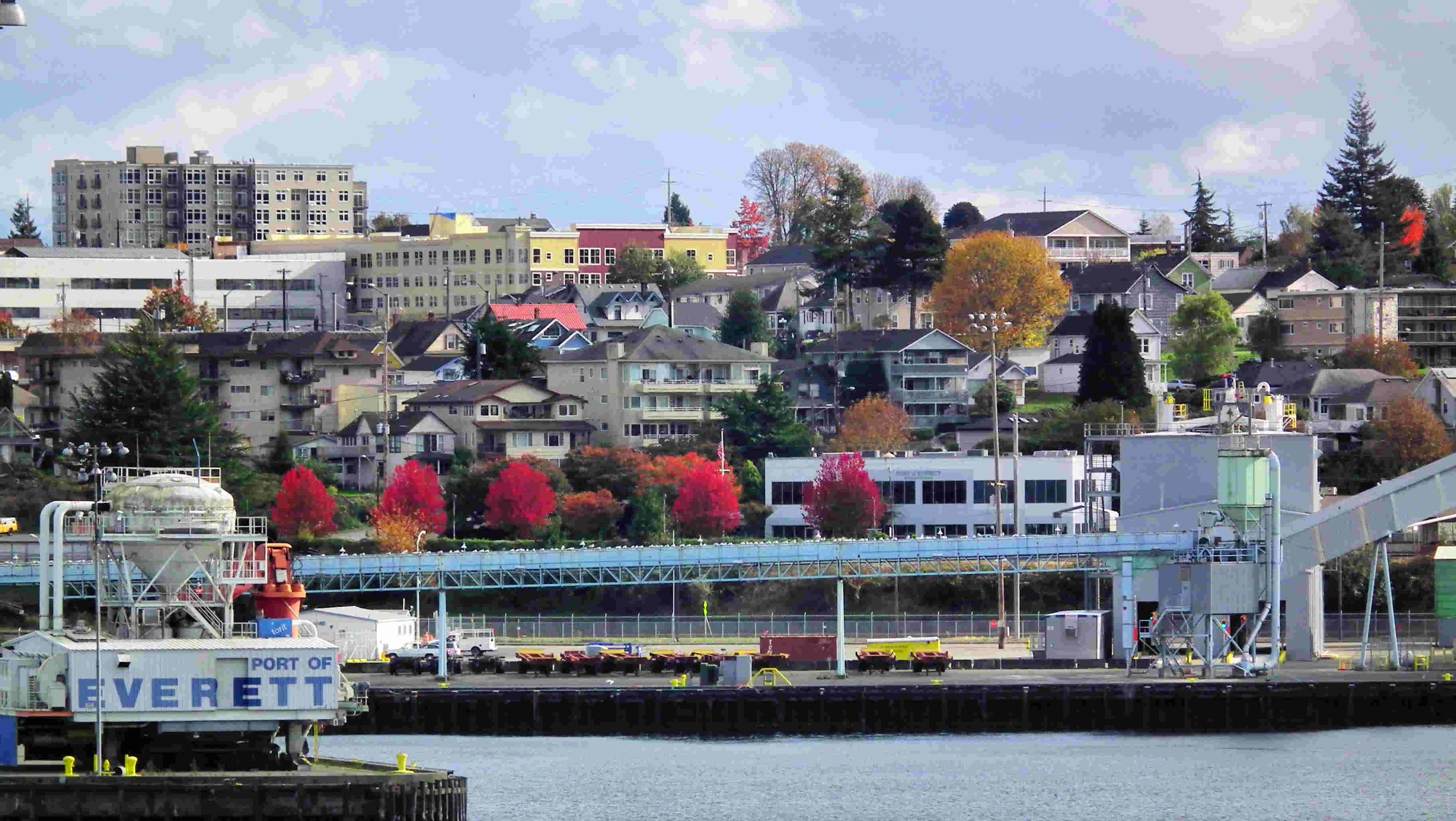
- The Port of Everett in 2010
- Interactive map of Port of Everett

Location
- Location: Everett, Washington, U.S.
- Coordinates: 47°58′47″N 122°13′09″W

Details
- Opened: 1918
- Operated by: Port of Everett Commission
- Land area: 3,000 acres (1,200 ha)
- CEO: Lisa Lefeber

Statistics
- Vessel arrivals: 142 (2016)
- Annual cargo tonnage: 257,000 short tons (233,000 t)
- Annual revenue: $49.8 million (2024)
- Website portofeverett.com

The Port of Everett is a public seaport district located on Possession Sound in Everett, Washington, United States. Founded in 1918, it operates a small cargo terminal, a public marina, waterfront real estate, and public recreational lands. The Port of Everett is the third-largest container port in the state of Washington, behind Tacoma and Seattle.

== History ==
The Port of Everett was established on July 13, 1918, via a referendum of Everett citizens. The port was formed in hopes of luring a naval shipyard amid a maritime boom caused by World War I, which would end a few months later. The new port instead became a major lumber trader in the 1920s, owing to the dominant industry in Everett at the time. A major shipbuilder, the Everett-Pacific Shipbuilding & Dry Dock Company, operated from 1942 to 1949 as part of the national response to World War II, but did not remain in place after the end of the war. The port later became dependent on importing parts for Boeing's aircraft assembly business in Everett, which also required rebuilding of several terminal facilities.

The port sold 110 acres (45 ha) to the U.S. Navy in 1987 for the creation of Naval Station Everett, a military installation that opened in 1991. The Port of Everett acquired the 58-acre (23 ha) Kimberly-Clark mill site in 2019 with plans for a redeveloped office park and other uses.

A referendum to increase the size of the Port of Everett's boundaries to encompass the rest of Snohomish County—excluding the existing Port of Edmonds—was placed on the August 2024 ballot. The port commission proposed the expansion to enlarge its tax base and provide services to a wider area. The proposal received opposition from the Tulalip Tribes.

== Facilities ==
The Port of Everett includes both a deep-water commercial seaport and a marina with over 2,300 slips, which is the largest public marina on the United States' West Coast. Ambitious redevelopment began in 2006 to convert the north end of the waterfront into a community of maritime businesses, retail shops and condominiums, beginning with the Port of Everett's Port Gardner Wharf. In 2006, the seaport received 119 ships and 59 barges, totaling some 192,000 short tons of cargo. The port's renovated South Terminal was opened in April 2021, featuring a set of 214-foot (65 m) cranes and a new dock.

The port also operates a boat launch on 10th Street; it serves a ferry to Jetty Island, an artificial island that was originally constructed in 1895 to help create an easier navigating experience for commercial ships.

== Waterfront businesses ==
The waterfront is also home to the Everett Yacht Club, which was founded in 1907, although it existed in some form as early as 1895. During summer months, the marina is home to the Waterfront Concert Series, part of a citywide free concert series. Each September, Tenth Street Park on the waterfront is home to the annual Everett Coho Derby, while each August the marina promenade is gowned in local art during the Fresh Paint Festival of Artists.

Residential apartments were first built at the port in 2021. The Port added housing as part of a larger push towards neighborhood and commercial development.

OceanGate, a private submersible manufacturer and operator, moved to the Port of Everett in 2015 and built several vessels at their Everett facility. Following the destruction of their submersible Titan in June 2023 the company's offices were closed indefinitely.

=== Redevelopment ===
The Port of Everett has several redevelopment programs for 65 acres (26 ha) of the waterfront, named districts, that have been underway since the 2010s; they aim to add mixed-use buildings and non-industrial businesses to the waterfront area. A 142-room hotel opened in late 2019 at Waterfront Place, the first portion of the redeveloped waterfront. It was followed by two apartment buildings with 249 units that opened in 2021 and a restaurant row opened in 2023. The second major area of the redevelopment, named the Millwright District, is scheduled to open beginning in 2026 once construction of new buildings and roads is completed. It is planned to have 40,000 square feet (3,700 m^{2}) of retail space, office space, and 200 housing units.
