= T Line (Sound Transit) =

Streetcar line in Tacoma, Washington

- Logo for Link light rail, showing a stylized "T" with an "S" embossed over it with negative space.
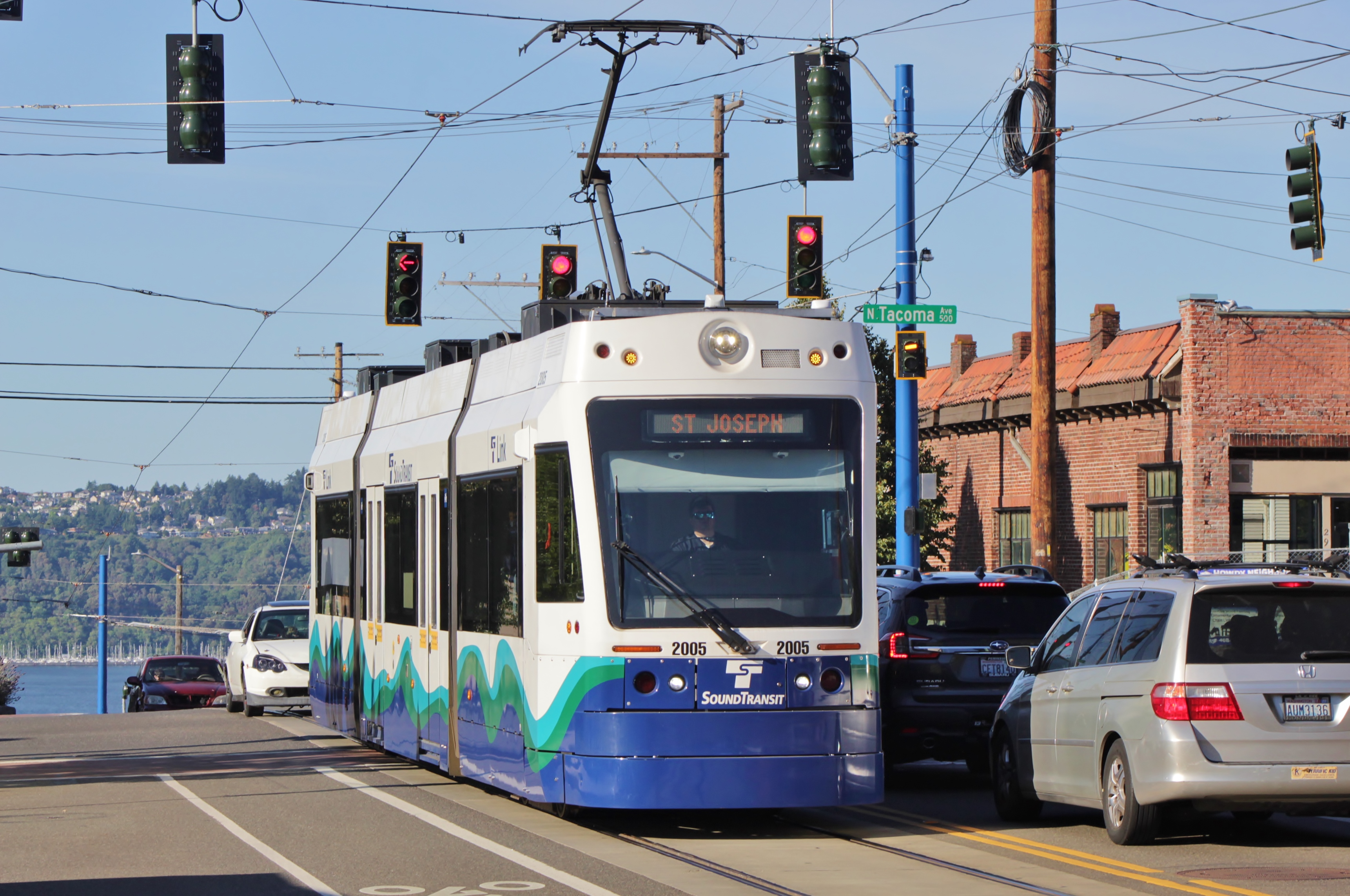
- A T Line streetcar in the Stadium District

Overview
- Other name(s): Tacoma Link; Orange Line
- Status: Operational
- Owner: Sound Transit
- Locale: Tacoma, Washington
- Termini: St. Joseph; Tacoma Dome Station (inbound)
- Stations: 12
- Website: soundtransit.org

Service
- Type: Light rail
- System: Link light rail
- Operator: Sound Transit
- Rolling stock: 3 Škoda 10 T vehicles; 5 Brookville Liberty vehicles
- Daily ridership: 3,907 (2025, weekdays)
- Ridership: 1,147,409 (2025)

History
- Opened: August 22, 2003

Technical
- Line length: 4.0 mi (6.4 km)
- Number of tracks: 1–2
- Character: At-grade, mixed between street running and exclusive lane
- Track gauge: 4 ft 8 1/2 in (1,435 mm) standard gauge
- Electrification: Overhead line, 750 V DC
- Operating speed: 25 mph (40 km/h)

The T Line, formerly known as Tacoma Link, is a light rail line in Tacoma, Washington, part of the Link light rail system operated by Sound Transit. It travels 4.0 miles (6.4 km) and serves 12 stations between Tacoma Dome Station, Downtown Tacoma, and Hilltop. The line carried 1.1 million total passengers in 2025, with a weekday average of over 3,900 boardings. Tacoma Link runs for nine to 18 hours per day, using streetcars at frequencies of 12 to 20 minutes.

Tacoma Link was approved in a regional transit ballot measure passed in 1996 and began construction in 2000. It was the first modern light rail system to be constructed in Washington state and succeeded a former streetcar system that ceased operations in 1938. Service on Tacoma Link began on August 22, 2003, at five stations, replacing a downtown shuttle bus. A sixth station, Commerce Street/South 11th Street, was opened in 2011. It was designated as the Orange Line in 2019 and renamed to the T Line in 2020.

Sound Transit extended the T Line by 2.4 miles (3.9 km) to the Stadium District and the Hilltop area west of Downtown Tacoma on September 16, 2023. A longer western extension to the Tacoma Community College campus via South 19th Street is planned to open in 2043.

== History ==
=== Background and proposals ===
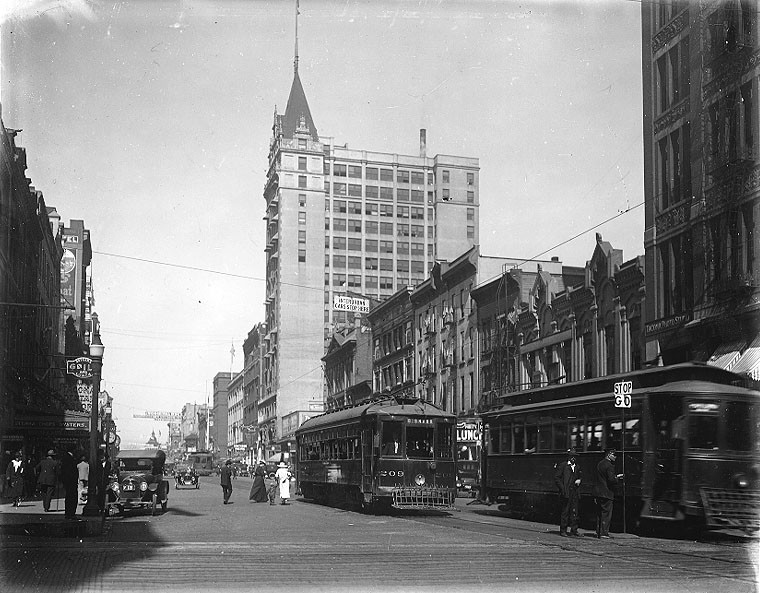
Photograph of streetcars on Pacific Avenue in Downtown Tacoma, c. 1919

Public transit service in Tacoma began with the opening of the city's first horse-drawn streetcar line on May 30, 1888, running on Pacific Avenue between Downtown and Old Town. The city's streetcar system was expanded and electrified, growing to 125 miles (201 km) by 1912 and serving outlying areas while feeding into the Seattle–Tacoma Interurban. The streetcar and cable car network was gradually replaced with motor buses, with the final streetcar leaving service on June 11, 1938. Bus service in Tacoma was gradually consolidated under the Tacoma Transit Company, which was acquired by the city in 1961 and folded into Pierce Transit in 1980.

A regional transit system, later named Sound Transit, was formed in the early 1990s to address traffic congestion in the region and proposed several projects for the Tacoma area. Tacoma had been targeted for urban revitalization, particularly around the University of Washington branch that opened in 1990. Among the proposed revitalization projects was the construction of a multimodal station near the Tacoma Dome that would be connected to Downtown Tacoma by a "shuttle" light rail line, costing approximately $40 million to construct. The Tacoma Dome Station would also be served by commuter rail and a regional light rail line continuing north to Federal Way, Seattle–Tacoma International Airport, and Seattle. A combined light rail line that served both Downtown Tacoma and the Tacoma–Seattle corridor was part of a $6.7 billion ballot measure that was rejected by voters in March 1995, but planning for the multimodal Tacoma Dome Station continued.

=== Approval and planning ===
A second transit plan was proposed without the Federal Way line, which was dropped in favor of express bus service, but retained the Downtown Tacoma connector. It was passed by voters in November 1996, allocating $50 million for a 1.6-mile (2.6 km) line in Tacoma that would be built as a "starter line" within the following six years. Tacoma Dome Station opened for buses in October 1997 and a shuttle bus connecting to Downtown Tacoma operated by Pierce Transit began service on February 2, 1998. The Downtown Connector was transferred to Sound Transit in 2000.

Route planning for the Downtown Tacoma line, named "Tacoma Link", began in early 1998 with the intent to create a new transportation connection to downtown retail and cultural attractions. A set of 20 potential route alignments were considered for connecting Tacoma Dome Station to the University of Washington campus, the South 13th Street area, and the Theater District. The preliminary options were narrowed down to five candidates in the draft environmental impact statement, which were grouped based on their use of either Commerce Street or Pacific Avenue to travel north–south through downtown. The line's cost rose by $12 million to $77 million due to the choice of low-floor streetcars that would be level with the platform.

The Commerce Street alignment was favored by the Tacoma city government, but a final decision by the city council and Sound Transit was delayed in favor of further studies. The Pacific Avenue option was narrowly favored by downtown businesses due to its increased traffic, but Commerce Street was seen as a less controversial route that would allow for easier expansion to the Stadium District. The city council approved the Commerce Street alignment in May 1999, and Sound Transit followed suit in July. Sound Transit also endorsed studies into making Tacoma Link a fare-free system due to projections that the costs of fare collection would exceed revenue on the line. Designs for the line's five stations were completed in early 2000, based on simple stations with unique design elements that reflect neighborhood identity.

=== Construction and disputes ===
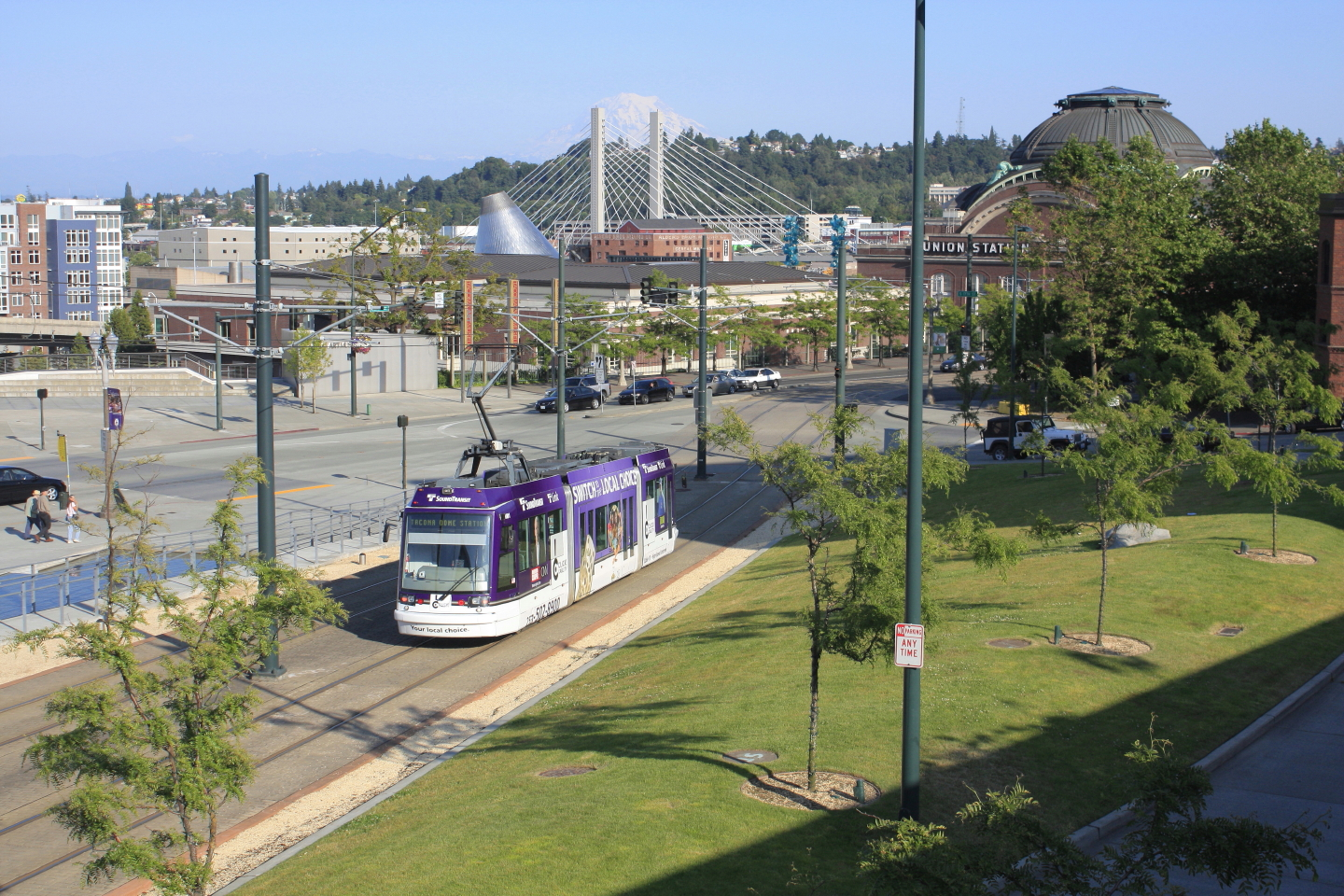
A T Line streetcar traveling southbound from Tollefson Plaza to Pacific Avenue

Construction of the light rail line near the Tacoma Dome began in August 2000, resulting in a reduction in parking that drew complaints from business owners. A formal groundbreaking was held on October 18, 2000, shortly after the commencement of Sounder commuter rail service to Tacoma Dome Station. Work on the downtown section was delayed into the following year due to a contract dispute and design changes to avoid buried telecommunications systems. During bidding for the $25 million construction contract, a low bid was rejected due to not meeting Sound Transit's small business participation standards. Gary Merlino Construction was awarded the contract in February 2001 and began in July; construction on the line's operations and maintenance facility in the Dome District had already begun a month earlier under a separate subcontractor.

The transition between Pacific Avenue and Commerce Street near the future Greater Tacoma Convention and Trade Center was to be via a public plaza, which began construction in June 2001. The first rails were laid in November 2001, with a formal ceremony the following month to mark the start of work on the entire Link light rail network. Sound Transit agreed to handle operations of the light rail trains on an interim basis for an indefinite period of time, opting not to contract with Pierce Transit or the city government. Major construction along Pacific Avenue began in February 2002, causing periodic closures that affected buses and businesses who requested the use of mitigation funds to make up for lost revenues. The three streetcars ordered by Sound Transit for Tacoma Link were manufactured in the Czech Republic by Škoda Transportation and delivered in September 2002, costing $3 million each. The cars were put on public display in Tacoma and Seattle over the following months to promote light rail projects.

As light rail construction prepared to reach Commerce Street, Qwest filed a lawsuit against Sound Transit to receive compensation for relocating its telecommunications lines away from the tracks; a U.S. District Court judge ruled in favor of Sound Transit, due to the use of public right of way by Qwest for their telecommunications lines. Another dispute, with BNSF Railway over a railroad crossing on Pacific Avenue that would intersect the light rail tracks, was settled in January 2003 with an agreement to suspend freight operations through the intersection. Commerce Street was re-opened for use by buses in February 2003 as light rail construction neared completion. The final section of track was welded in place in early April, marking the ceremonial end of track construction, and the installation of overhead power systems began later in the month. Testing of the streetcars began on June 18, 2003, as the line was electrified for the first time 65 years after the discontinuation of the original streetcar network. The first accident for the new line occurred during testing on August 5, when a delivery truck driver scraped a streetcar while illegally parked on the tracks.

=== Opening and later projects ===
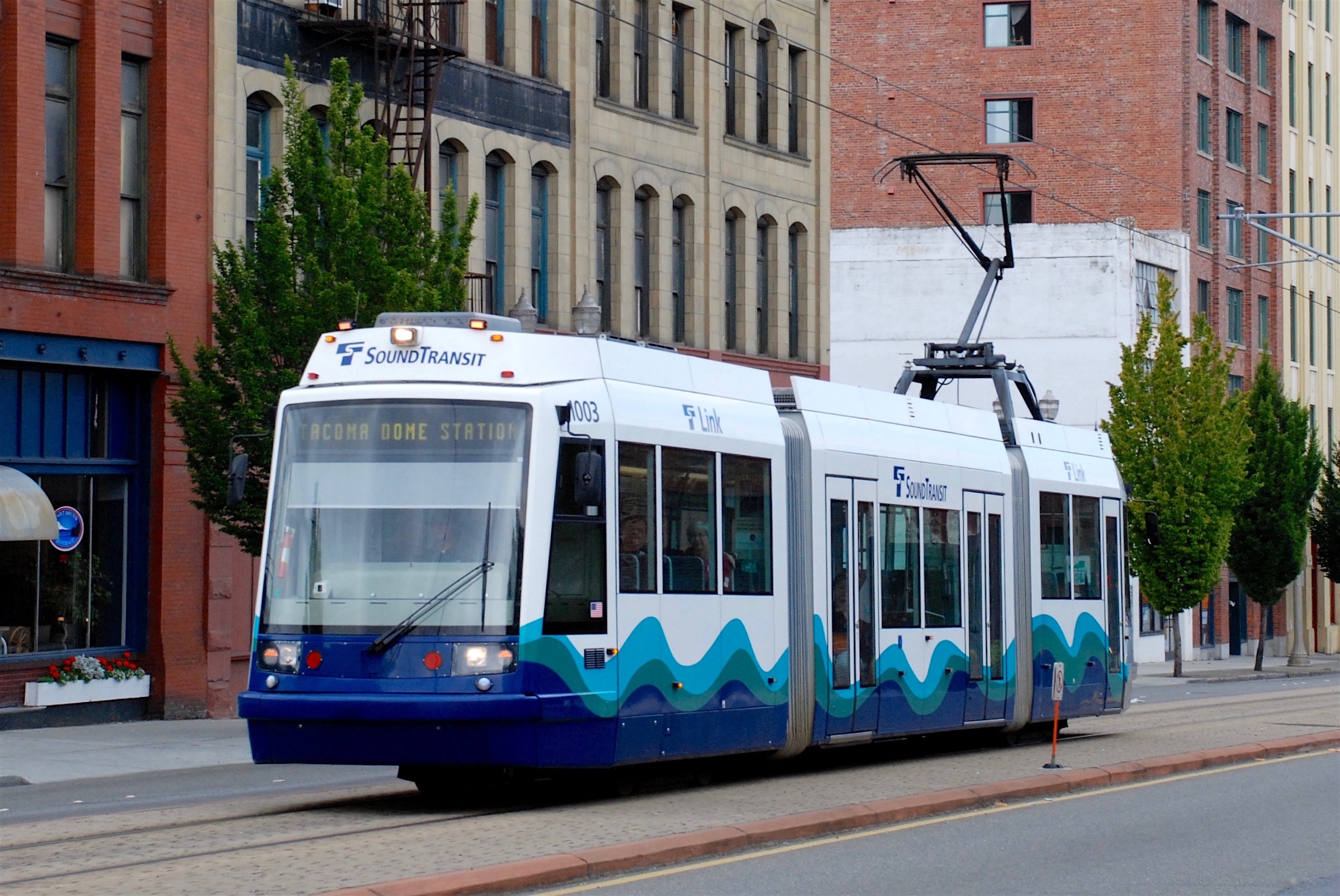
One of the T Line's first series of vehicles in bidirectional single track on Pacific Avenue

Tacoma Link opened for service on August 22, 2003, becoming the first modern light rail system in Washington state. 4,400 people rode the train on the opening day, which was marked by a ribbon-cutting event and a community festival at Tacoma Dome Station. Weekday ridership on the line averaged 2,000 patrons during its opening month, matching original projections for regular ridership in 2010; the system reached 500,000 boardings in April 2004 and one million by December. The project's total cost, $80.4 million, ran above the original estimates due to inflation and additional street improvements, including sidewalks, lighting, benches, and bicycle racks.

Prior to the start of light rail service, the Puyallup Tribe of Indians proposed an extension of Tacoma Link to their new casino-hotel complex, approximately 1.25 miles (2.01 km) southeast of Tacoma Dome Station near Interstate 5. A study into the extension was commissioned in 2004 by the Puyallup Tribe, with Sound Transit finding that the project would cost and estimated $38 million to $72 million depending on which of the four potential routes were chosen. The study also projected that ridership levels would require a new fleet of two-car trains and longer platforms for the rest of the line, leading to increased costs. Two additional extensions to the west were also studied by Sound Transit for inclusion into a long-range plan, but were deferred due to their high costs. The Tacoma city government also proposed a network of streetcars in 2007, looking to emulate the Portland Streetcar system rather than extending Tacoma Link.

The city government also proposed the construction of an infill station between the Convention Center and Theater District to serve downtown commuters. Sound Transit approved the proposal and opened Commerce Street/South 11th Street station on September 15, 2011. It was constructed using funding from the city and tied into a new plaza built atop a nearby parking garage. Due to the addition of the new station, train frequencies were reduced from every 10 minutes during peak hours to every 12 minutes. Tacoma Link was renamed to the Orange Line as part of a systemwide rebranding by Sound Transit in September 2019. The name was later withdrawn due to issues with the Red Line in Seattle; an updated designation, the T Line (colored orange), was introduced in 2022.

=== Hilltop Extension ===
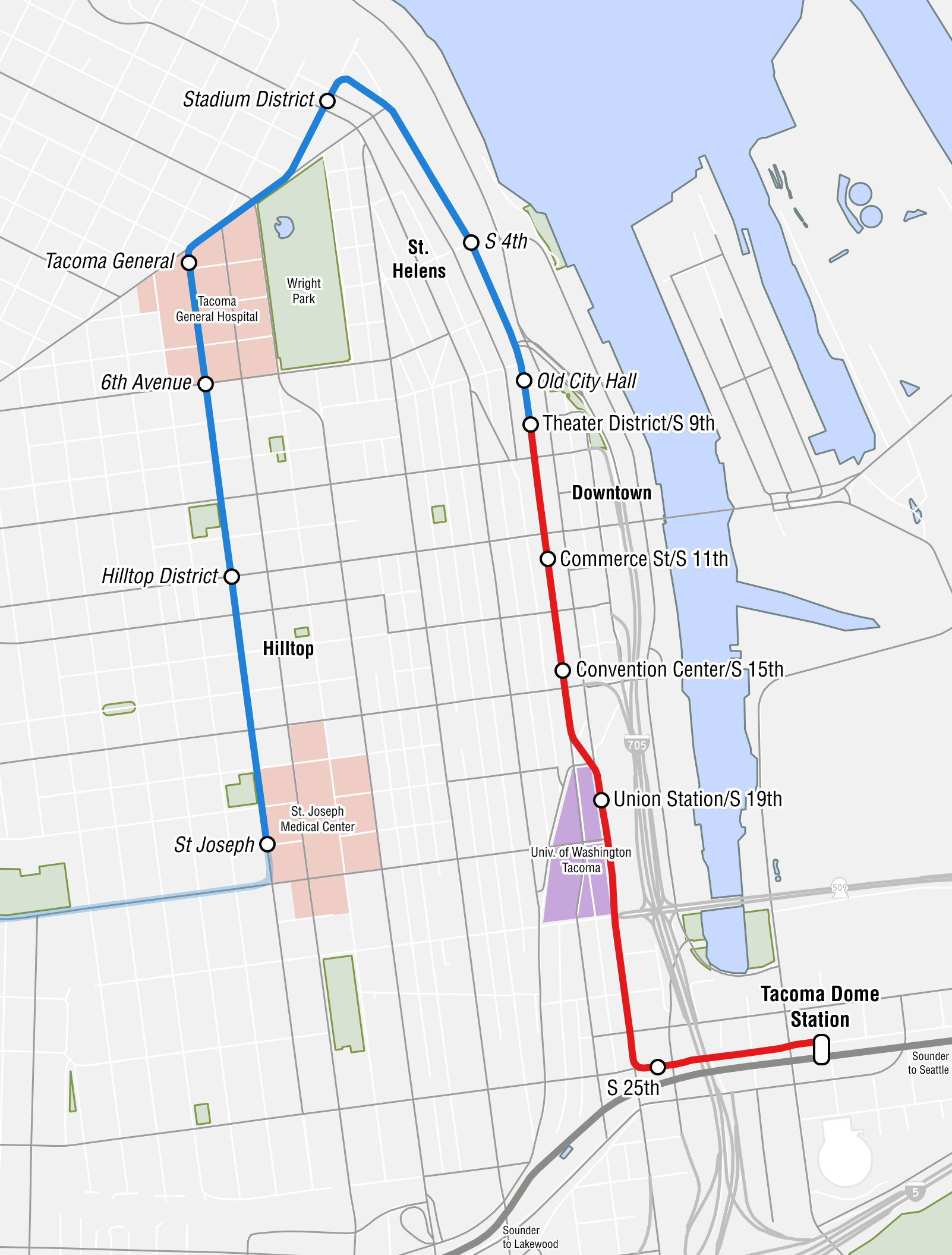
Map of the T Line and the Hilltop expansion (in blue), and the planned expansion to Tacoma Community College (in light blue)

A 2.4-mile-long (3.9 km) extension of the T Line from Downtown Tacoma to the Stadium District and Hilltop neighborhood opened on September 16, 2023. It runs mostly in mixed traffic on Stadium Way, Division Avenue, and Martin Luther King Jr. Way; the project included the construction of six new stations and the relocation of the existing terminus at Theater District to Old City Hall station. The extension serves Stadium High School and the adjacent Stadium Bowl; Tacoma General Hospital; and St. Joseph Medical Center.

The Hilltop Extension was approved by voters as part of the Sound Transit 2 ballot measure in 2008 and was estimated to cost $217 million, primarily paid for by local funding and federal grants. Construction began with a groundbreaking in November 2018 and track laying in June 2019 under the direction of Walsh Construction. By March 2021, construction was 75 percent complete, including most trackwork and installation of catenary poles.

The T Line suspended operations and was replaced with shuttle buses for ten weeks beginning in August 2022 to connect the extension's tracks, electrical infrastructure, and other systems to the existing line. Unfortunately, a stray electric current was discovered, which meant that extra work was required to prevent corrosion. Since the shutdown, the station at Theater District was permanently closed due to its proximity to the new station at Old City Hall.

The extension was expected to open in early 2023, but was delayed to later in the year due to construction issues that were identified after track installation. Sound Transit attributed some of the delay to incorrect city records on the location of utility lines as well as change orders for catenary pole installation. Construction was completed in July 2023, and testing with "simulated service" began that same month with reduced frequency on the entire line. The extension cost $282 million to construct and daily ridership on the whole line was projected to increase to over 10,800 by 2035. It has spurred transit-oriented development in Hilltop and the Stadium District, including several multi-family residential buildings that opened in the 2020s.

== Route ==
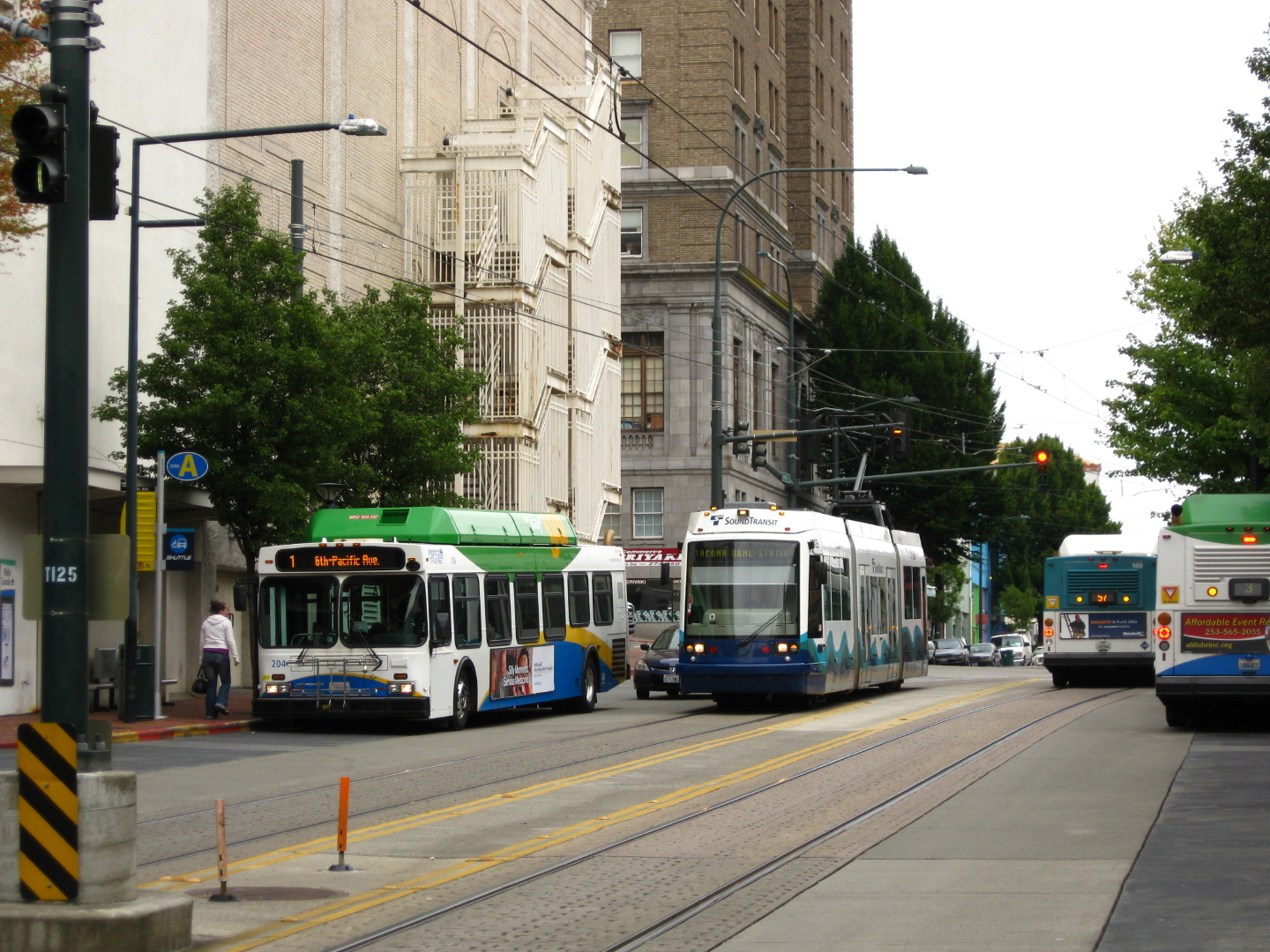
The T Line shares its Commerce Street section with a Pierce Transit bus mall

The T Line is 4 miles (6.4 km) long and generally runs at-grade in mixed traffic with an exclusive lane for its single-track section. Outbound trains travel west from an operations and maintenance facility located on East 25th Street near McKinley Avenue to the line's terminus at Tacoma Dome Station. The station has a single side platform for Link trains, located south of the 2,283-space parking garage and bus loop and north of the Sounder commuter rail and Amtrak station. The single-track railway continues west in the median of East 25th Street and crosses under Interstate 705 before reaching South 25th Street station on the south curb of the street near A Street.

T Line trains then turn north onto Pacific Avenue and travel in the median for several blocks parallel to Interstate 705, splitting into two tracks after South 21st Street. The dual-tracked railway reaches Union Station/South 19th Street station, located adjacent to the historic Union Station (now a courthouse), the Washington State History Museum, the Museum of Glass, and the University of Washington, Tacoma campus. Near the Tacoma Art Museum, the tracks leave Pacific Avenue and travel northwest onto Commerce Street above Tollefson Plaza, crossing over the Prairie Line Trail and stopping at South 15th Street near the Greater Tacoma Convention Center.

On Commerce Street, Link trains share lanes with mixed traffic through a major bus transfer area for Pierce Transit. Trains stop at Theater District at South 11th Street, located near Tacoma's city hall and the historic Pantages and Rialto theaters. The line stops near Tacoma's historic city hall building and at 4th Street on Stadium Way as it ascends towards the Stadium District. The tracks turn west onto North 1st Street near the eponymous Stadium High School and Stadium Bowl and stop in the neighborhood's commercial district before merging onto Division Avenue. The T Line passes Wright Park and turns south onto Martin Luther King Jr. Way with two stops in the Tacoma General Hospital complex. The line stops at South 11th Street in the Hilltop neighborhood and continues south to its inbound terminus near St. Joseph Medical Center.

=== Stations ===
The six original stations on the T Line are built with 90-foot (27 m) platforms that are long enough to accommodate one car at a time, but were designed to support further expansion for multi-car trains. Each station features shelters, seating, rider information, and public artwork that reflects the history of the surrounding neighborhood. Each station on the Hilltop Extension has decorative canopies designed by Tacoma artist Kenji Hamai Stoll.

Key
| † | Former station |
| * | Future station |

| Station | Image | Opened | Weekday boardings (2025) | Connections and notes |
|---|---|---|---|---|
| Tacoma Dome Station | Link platform at Tacoma Dome Station | August 22, 2003 | 773 | Connections to Sounder commuter rail and Sound Transit Express |
| South 25th Street | South 25th Street station platform | August 22, 2003 | 278 | |
| Union Station/South 19th Street | Union Station | August 22, 2003 | 549 | |
| Convention Center/South 15th Street | Convention Center station | August 22, 2003 | 155 | |
| Theater District | Theater District station platform | September 15, 2011 | 438 | Originally named Commerce Street/South 11th Street |
| Theater District/South 9th Street † | Theater District station and Old City Hall | August 22, 2003 | — | Closed on August 1, 2022, and relocated to Old City Hall |
| Old City Hall | Old City Hall station | September 16, 2023 | 178 | Relocated from Theater District/South 9th Street |
| South 4th Street | South 4th Street station | September 16, 2023 | 68 | |
| Stadium District | Stadium District station | September 16, 2023 | 423 | |
| Tacoma General | Tacoma General station | September 16, 2023 | 112 | |
| 6th Avenue | 6th Avenue station | September 16, 2023 | 198 | |
| Hilltop District | Hilltop District station | September 16, 2023 | 338 | |
| St. Joseph | St. Joseph station | September 16, 2023 | 398 | |

== Service ==
T Line trains run 18 hours per day on weekdays, from 4:30 am to 10:30 pm, 15 hours per day on Saturdays, from 7:00 am to 10:30 pm, and 8 hours per day on Sundays and holidays, from 9:40 am to 6:30 pm. Trains operate at a frequency of every 12 minutes during the day on weekdays and Saturdays and every 20 minutes on Sundays, some holidays, and during early morning and evening service on weekdays. Operating hours are occasionally extended into the late evening for events at the Tacoma Dome, with trains running more frequently.

The T Line takes approximately 23 minutes to traverse its entire route from the Tacoma Dome Station to St. Joseph station. A maximum of two trains are able to operate on the original T Line section due to the single-track section between Union Station and Tacoma Dome Station. Prior to the opening of Commerce Street/South 11th Street station in 2011, trains ran at frequencies of 10 minutes during the day and 20 minutes during other hours. A restoration of 10-minute frequencies was planned as part of the Hilltop Extension's opening in 2023, but was reduced to 12 minutes due to operational issues and a lack of break time for drivers.

=== Ridership ===
Annual ridership of the T Line
| Year | Ridership | %± |
|---|---|---|
| 2003 | 266,600 | — |
| 2004 | 794,582 | +198.0% |
| 2005 | 884,895 | +11.4% |
| 2006 | 885,397 | +0.1% |
| 2007 | 919,013 | +3.8% |
| 2008 | 930,632 | +1.3% |
| 2009 | 889,320 | −4.4% |
| 2010 | 871,793 | −2.0% |
| 2011 | 972,429 | +11.5% |
| 2012 | 1,024,053 | +5.3% |
| 2013 | 1,000,316 | −2.3% |
| 2014 | 963,694 | −3.7% |
| 2015 | 980,705 | +1.8% |
| 2016 | 937,885 | −3.6% |
| 2017 | 972,405 | +3.7% |
| 2018 | 897,642 | −7.7% |
| 2019 | 934,724 | +4.1% |
| 2020 | 433,247 | −53.6% |
| 2021 | 371,938 | −14.2% |
| 2022 | 267,510 | −30.8% |
| 2023 | 284,874 | +6.2% |
| 2024 | 919,603 | +322.8% |
| 2025 | 986,897 | +7.3% |
Sources: Sound Transit, APTA

The T Line carried a total of 1,147,409 passengers in 2025, averaging 3,907 riders on weekdays. Ridership on the line fluctuates based on several factors, including special events scheduled at the Tacoma Dome or hosted in Downtown Tacoma, and class times at the University of Washington campus in Tacoma. T Line patronage peaked at 1.024 million annual riders in 2012, but has since declined due to the loss of several major downtown employers. Total ridership from 2017 to 2018 declined by 7.6 percent year over year due to the closure of the Tacoma Dome for renovations, but rebounded in 2019 to a total of 934,724 passengers. Ridership fell to under a half-million total passengers in 2020 due to the COVID-19 pandemic and remained near 1,300 daily riders for several years. It returned to its 2010s levels after the opening of the Hilltop Extension in September 2023 and monthly boardings had increased by 170 percent by late 2025. The extension's seven stations accounted for 42 percent of the T Line's ridership from January 2024 to July 2025.

=== Fares ===
Fares were originally not charged on the T Line, with operating costs covered by Sound Transit and $29,000 annually from the Tacoma Business Improvement Area. Sound Transit chose to launch the service without fares due to the cost of collection exceeding projected revenues. A budget shortfall caused by the late 2000s recession caused Sound Transit to consider a $1 fare in 2010, but the decision was pushed to a later date.

The Sound Transit Board approved a $1 base fare in September 2013 that would take effect the following year. It would be increased to $1.50 in 2016 to cover the cost of fare enforcement and installation of ticket vending machines. The proposed fare was unpopular with riders, business owners, and local boosters due to the potential impact on tourism, with a predicted 25 percent drop in ridership. Before the fare could take effect, the Downtown Tacoma Business Improvement Area agreed to fund the difference in revenue by paying $29,000 annually to Sound Transit for two years of free fares.

The Tacoma Business Improvement Area agreed to renew its $29,000 annual subsidy in April 2016, covering the equivalent of a $2 fare until the opening of the Hilltop Extension. A $2 adult fare and $1 reduced fare for low-income adults, senior citizens, and disabled adults was implemented and collected beginning with the opening of the Hilltop Extension in September 2023. Fares for passengers under the age of 18 are waived as part of a statewide program.

== Rolling stock and equipment ==
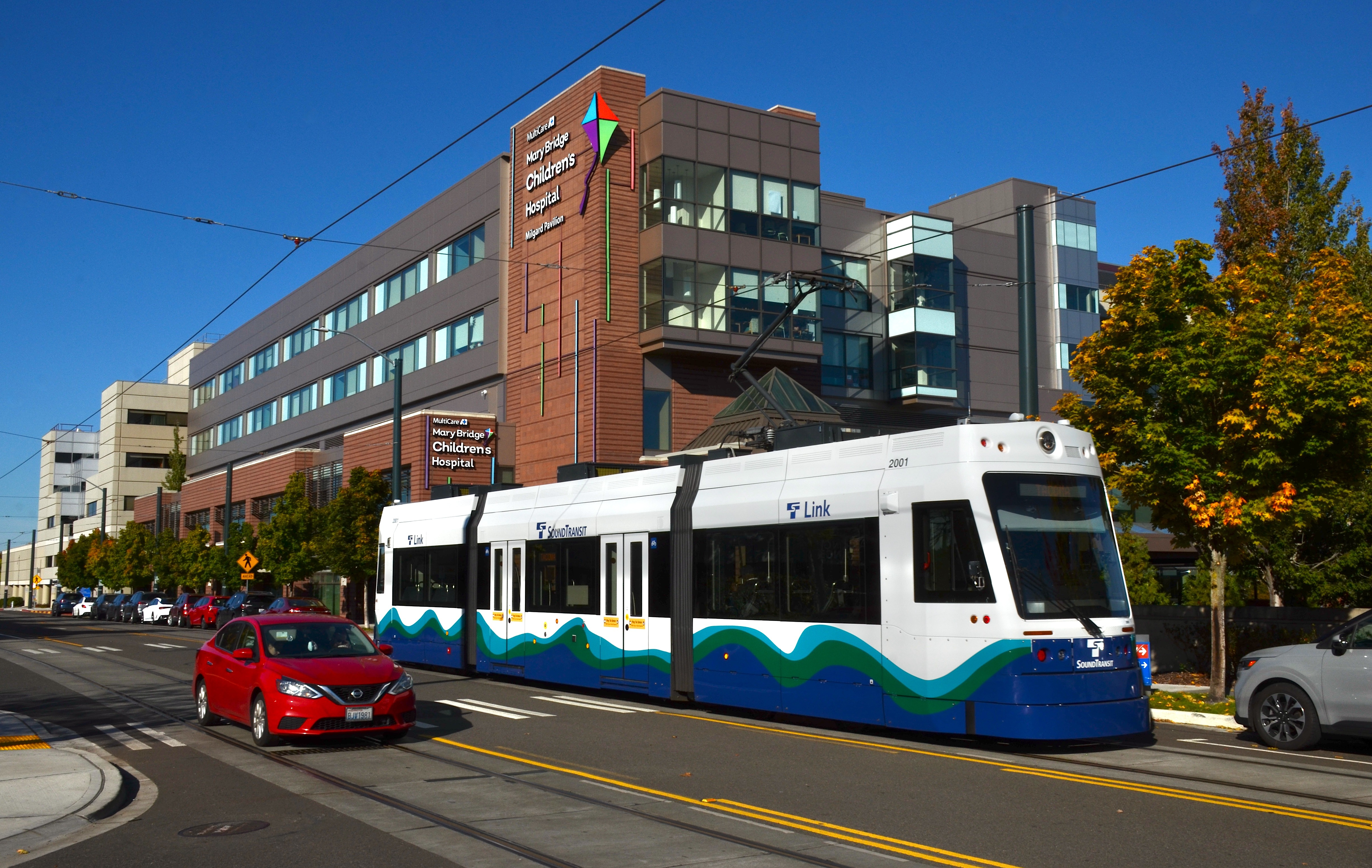
Car 2001 on the Hilltop Extension. Brookville-built streetcars now comprise the majority of the T Line's fleet.

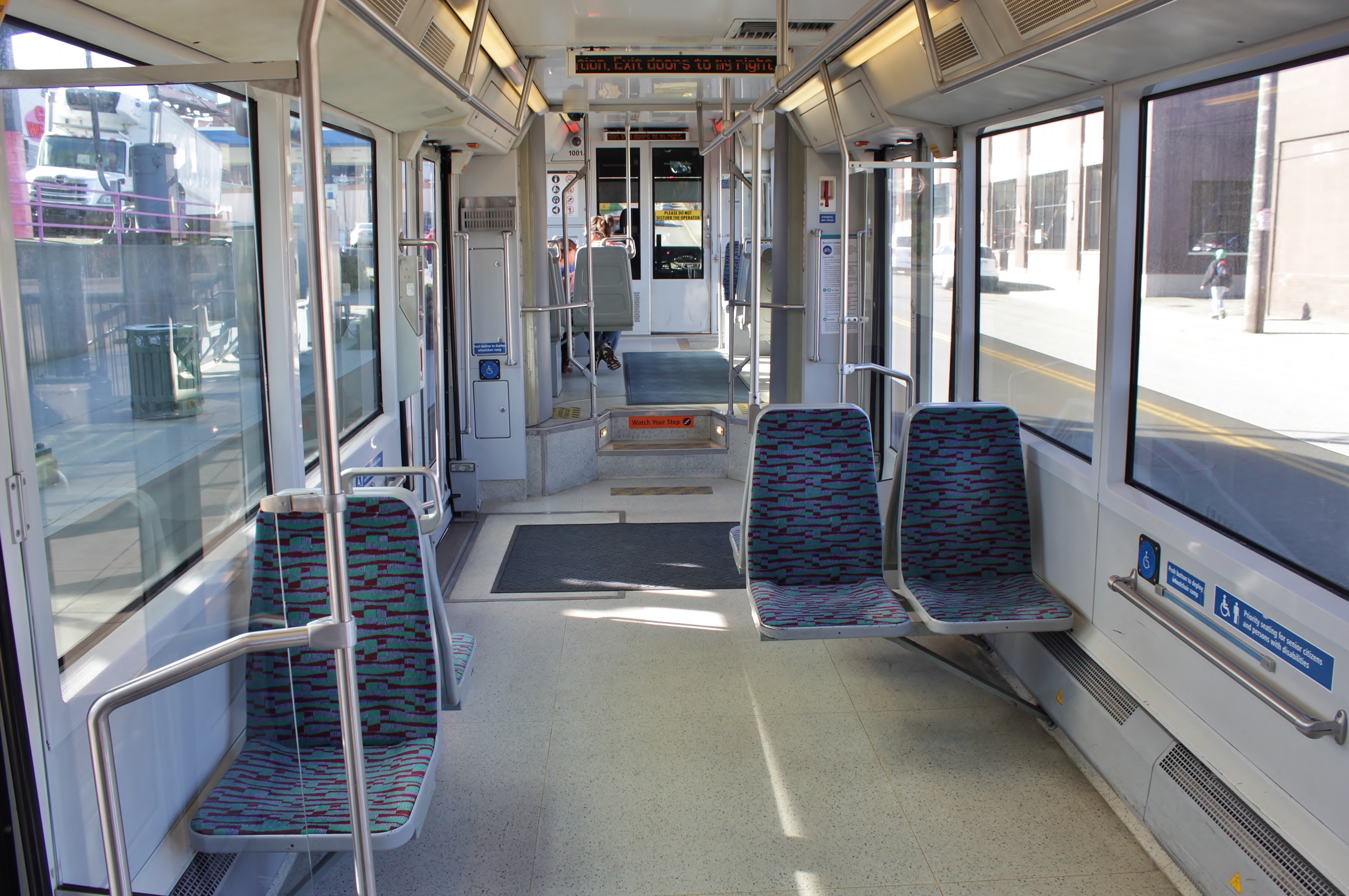
Interior of a Škoda 10 T articulated streetcar run on the T Line

The T Line fleet consists of eight low-floor articulated streetcars that are 66 feet (20.12 m) long and 8 feet (2.44 m) wide with two articulation joints, between which is a low-floor central section. The cars and platforms are built for level boarding, with a mechanical wheelchair ramp deployed by operators upon request. All streetcars in the T Line fleet are stored and maintained at an operating base located east of Tacoma Dome Station and Freighthouse Square. The system has several operational differences from the 1 Line fleet, including electrical systems and its minimum turning radius, that makes the two lines incompatible with each other.

The first three streetcars are Škoda 10 Ts, numbered 1001 to 1003, that were manufactured in the Czech Republic by Škoda Transportation. They are identical to cars used by the Portland Streetcar system in Portland, Oregon. Each Škoda streetcar has 30 seats and can carry an additional 85 passengers at crush load. They each weigh 31 short tons (28,123 kg; 28 long tons) and can reach a top speed of 25 miles per hour (40 km/h). They are unable to be coupled and draw their electrical power from overhead catenary that is energized at 750 volts direct current.

The second generation of T Line vehicles are five Liberty NXT streetcars, numbered 2001 to 2005, that were manufactured in the United States by the Brookville Equipment Corporation. The Brookville streetcars have the same general dimensions as the Škoda vehicles but seat 26 passengers and can carry up to 100 passengers at crush load. The five streetcars were ordered in 2017 at a cost of $26.5 million and delivered between March and November 2022. They entered service in July 2023. The contract with Brookville also includes an option to order five additional cars. In 2025, Sound Transit and the City of Portland, Oregon, proposed a swap of their streetcars due to the compatibility of their respective rolling stock as well as operational needs. Three of the newer Liberty NXT units on the Portland Streetcar system would move to Tacoma, while the older Škoda 10 Ts would be sent to Portland with a $16.6 million payment and spare parts. The Sound Transit board approved the plan on December 18, 2025.

== Future expansion ==
=== Tacoma Community College Extension ===
An extension beyond the Hilltop neighborhood to the Tacoma Community College campus in western Tacoma was funded by the Sound Transit 3 ballot measure, approved by voters in 2016. It is scheduled to open in 2043, having been delayed two years due to funding issues. The 3.5-mile-long (5.6 km) extension would use South 19th Street and stop at six stations, carrying approximately 18,000 daily riders and costing up to $478 million. Train frequency would be increased to six minutes during peak periods and a section of the original line near Union Station would be double-tracked.
