= Streetcars in Tacoma, Washington =

Streetcars were the primary mode of public transport in Tacoma, Washington, United States from 1888 until their discontinuance in 1938. Operated together with a network of interurbans, streetcars provided transport within Tacoma and throughout the Puget Sound region. Buses replaced the last streetcars in 1938. Streetcar-type transportation returned to Tacoma in 2003 with the opening of the Tacoma Link, a 4-mile (6.4 km) light rail line in Downtown Tacoma. There are proposals both to expand this system and to construct a new heritage streetcar system.

== History ==
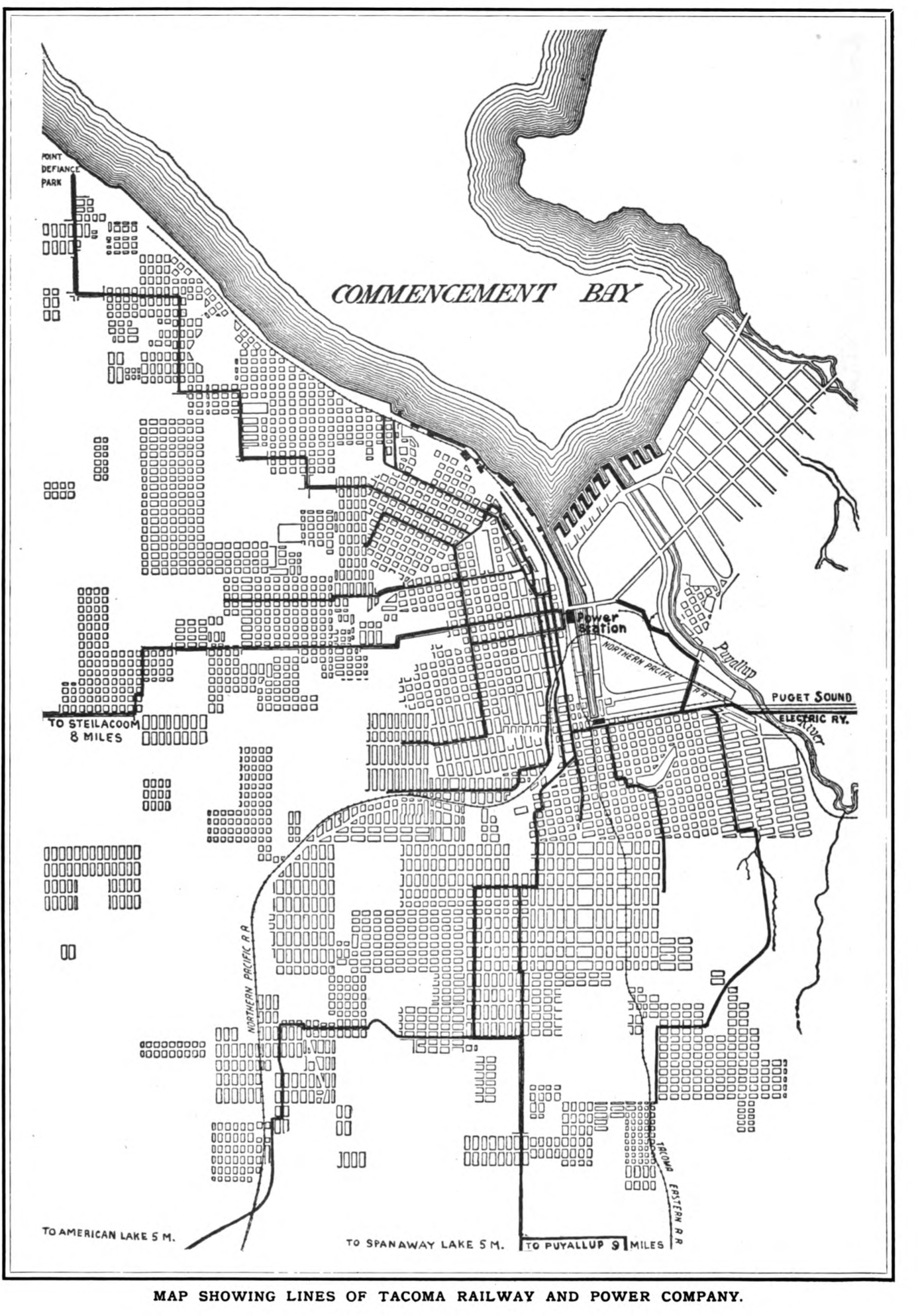
Map Showing Lines of Tacoma Washington Railway and Power Company c 1907

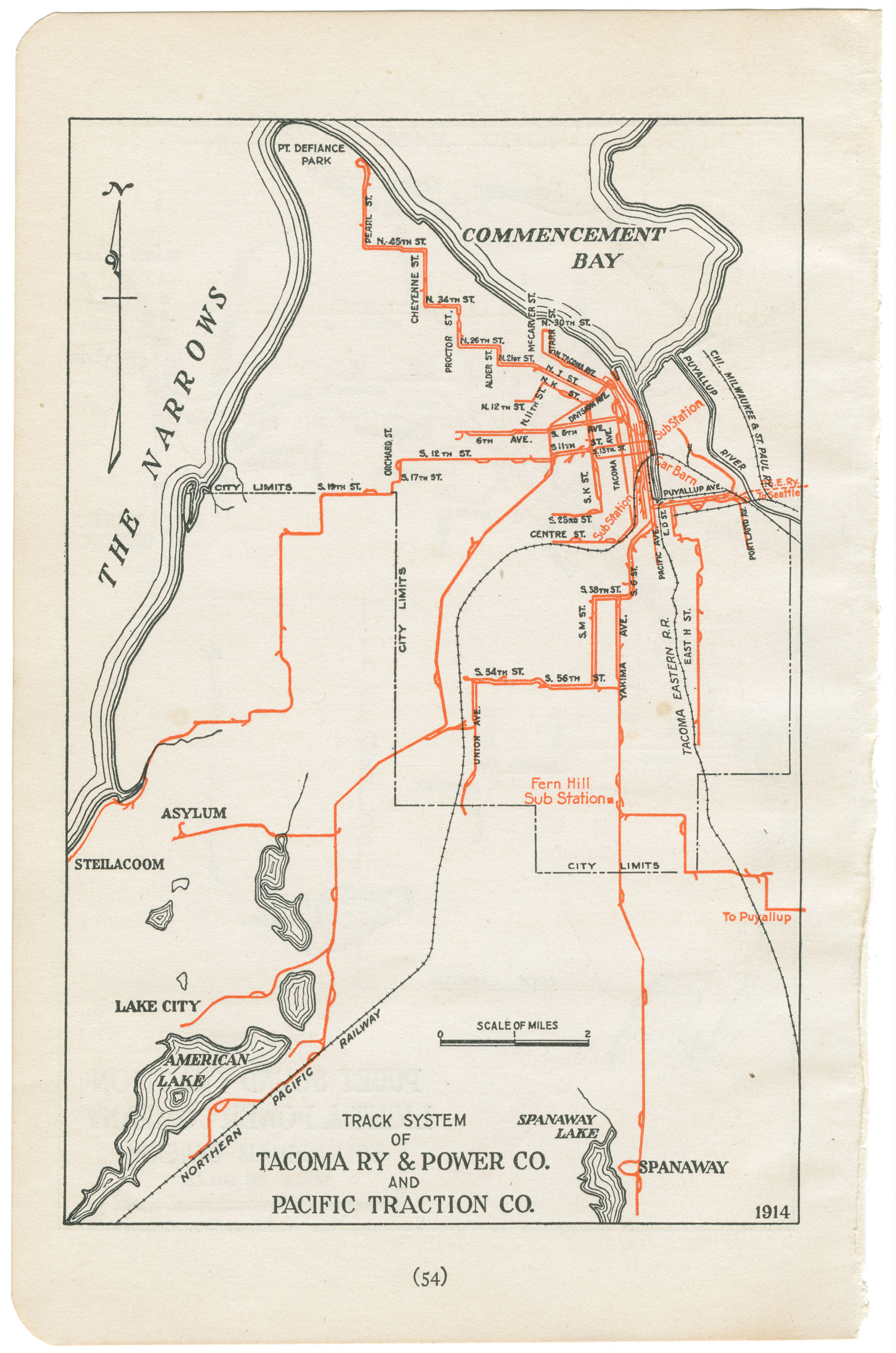
Map of the Tacoma streetcar system in 1914

A century ago Tacoma, like many American cities, had an extensive rail transit system. The first two streetcar lines in Tacoma were constructed in 1888 along the lengths of Pacific Avenue and Tacoma Avenue between Downtown and Old Town, and opened on May 30, 1888. They were horse-drawn streetcars with a pair of horses pulling each of the yellow streetcars. The lines were a success from the start, carrying many passengers, and were very soon thereafter extended. From these few lines others sprang up, each emanating from Downtown Tacoma into the surrounding areas, allowing for houses and business areas to develop.

By around 1912 the city boasted 125 miles (201 km) of streetcar trackage (much of it electrified) and almost 30 streetcar lines as well as an electric interurban rail connection to Seattle. Tacoma also had a simple cable car loop running from South 11th and 'A' St. to what is known now as Martin Luther King Jr. Way, down South 13th St. back to 11th and 'A'. This simple and frequent line helped to integrate trolley lines that served each street elevation. It also helped to ferry passengers up Tacoma's steep hills which assisted in integrating the eastern and western sections of Downtown Tacoma.

The streetcar lines individually had experienced many troubles over their 50-year lifetime, including many buyouts, defaults, takeovers, worker strikes and one notable tragedy. On a rainy July 4, 1900, a trolley jumped the tracks, plunging into a ravine and killing 43 passengers.

At its peak the Tacoma Railway and Power Company was transporting in the range of 30,000,000 passengers a year, a number still not reached by the modern Pierce Transit. Because of increasing road construction the trolleys became difficult to operate in an environment increasingly dominated by personal automobiles and taxis. The year that US 99 was completed commuter traffic between Tacoma and Seattle via the electric Interurban fell off nearly 40%, signaling the end of the trolley era. The last streetcars in Tacoma ran on June 11, 1938. The day was marked by a citywide public holiday, with excursions over part of the route and a "Gay Nineties" dance at the Winthrop Hotel. The system was replaced with brand new rubber tired buses that could more easily move in and out of the growing amounts of traffic in downtown. However, the system failed again and was eventually acquired by the City of Tacoma – becoming the precursor of Pierce Transit.

In the mid-1990s the Puget Sound region was dealing with increasing traffic. Voters approved Sound Move, a tri-county transportation package that formed Sound Transit. One of the major projects for the Pierce County/Tacoma area was Tacoma Link light rail line, which has helped to reinvigorate local interest in streetcars in the City of Tacoma.

Reported streetcar and interurban operating track between 1894 and 1926 in Tacoma, Washington. View source data.

== T Line (Tacoma Link) ==
The T Line (formerly known as Tacoma Link) is a 4-mile (6.4 km) light rail line located in downtown Tacoma and nearby areas. The line began in 2003 and primarily functioned to transport commuters between a combined parking garage/transit hub and the downtown core. In September 2023, the T Line was expanded to Saint Joseph Hospital via the Stadium and Hilltop districts.

== Heritage streetcar ==
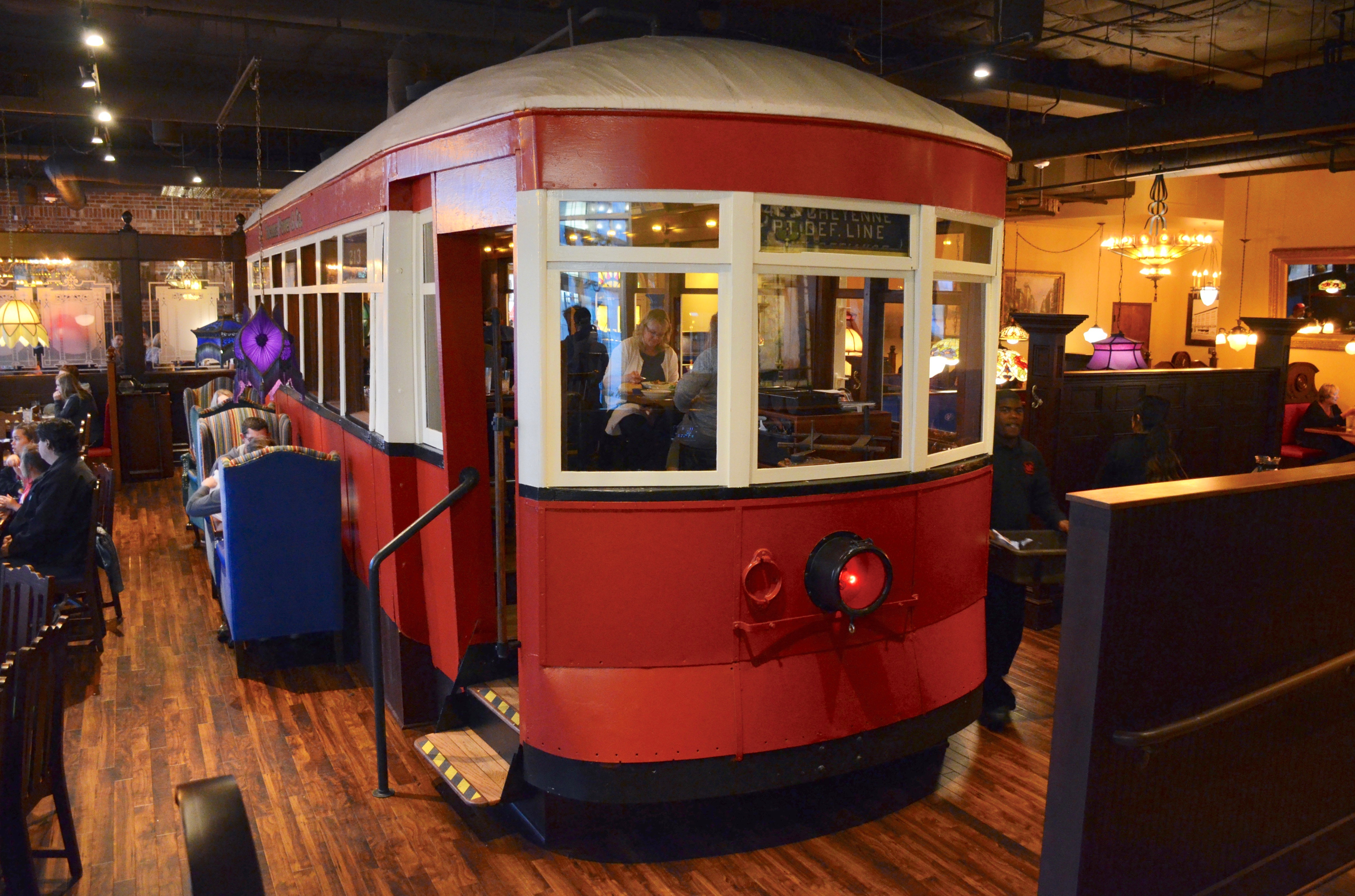
A former Tacoma Railway & Power Co. streetcar survives inside The Old Spaghetti Factory restaurant in downtown Tacoma.

A grassroots movement in the 2000s proposed to construct a heritage streetcar system which would interchange with the existing Tacoma Link but be operationally distinct. An advisory committee formed in 2007 recommended six corridors for a potential system that would originate in Downtown Tacoma and serve 6th Avenue, Portland Avenue, the Stadium District, and the Hilltop neighborhood. In 2008 a committee of the Tacoma City Council accepted the findings of feasibility study concerning this proposal, which did not include cost estimates.

== See also ==
- Škoda 10 T
- Tacoma Link
- First Hill Streetcar
- Streetcars in North America
