= Union Station/South 19th Street station =

Light rail station in Tacoma, Washington, U.S.

Union Station
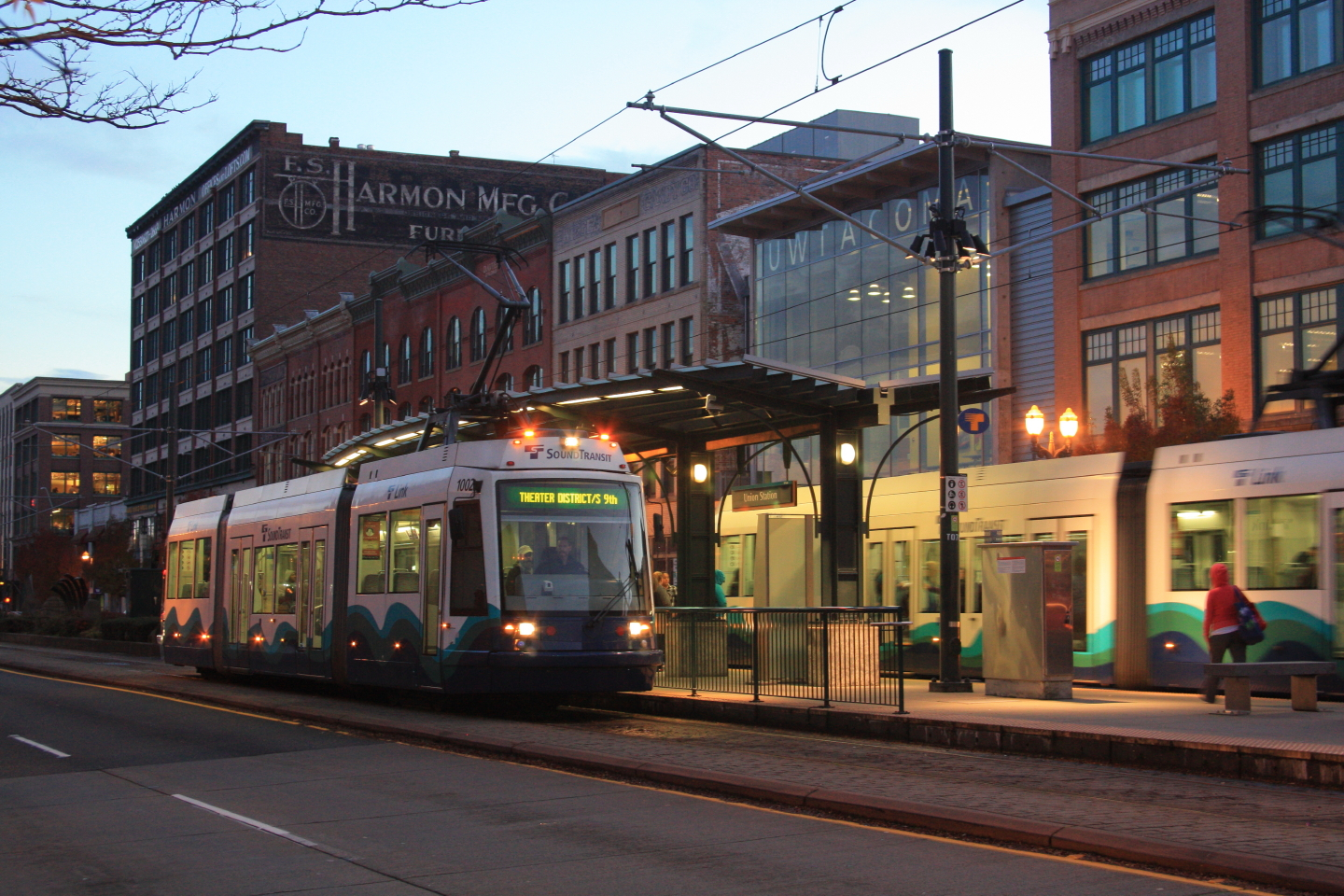
- Union Station/South 19th Street station platform

General information
- Other names: Union Station/South 19th Street
- Location: South 19th Street and Pacific Avenue; Tacoma, Washington; United States
- Coordinates: 47°14′42″N 122°26′12″W
- Owner: Sound Transit
- Platforms: 1 island platform
- Tracks: 2
- Connections: Sound Transit Express, Pierce Transit

Construction
- Accessible: Yes

History
- Opened: August 22, 2003

Passengers
- 549 daily weekday boardings (2025); 138,561 total boardings (2025)

Services
Preceding station	Sound Transit	Following station
Link
Convention Center/South 15th Street toward St. Joseph	T Line	South 25th Street toward Tacoma Dome
Location

Union Station/South 19th Street station is a light rail station on Link light rail's T Line in Tacoma, Washington, United States. The station officially opened for service on August 22, 2003, and serves the University of Washington, Tacoma, a variety of museums, government buildings, and apartment complexes.

The station is named after the nearby and much larger Tacoma Union Station, which now serves as a courthouse. It is located near the University of Washington, Tacoma campus, Museum of Glass, Washington State History Museum, and Tacoma Art Museum. Union Station also serves as the main entryway to the Tall Ships Festival on the nearby Thea Foss Waterway.

Artwork at the station reflects the area's American Indian culture, and the manufacturing and shipbuilding that took place in the vicinity (including in many of the buildings used by UW Tacoma). Artwork includes:

- The outline of a ship's frame and American Indian fishing tools in the median by the station
- Roof of the station platform is meant to look like the ribs of a ship
- Photos and poems covering manufacturing and fishing in the area on the platform
