= Old City Hall station =

Streetcar station in Tacoma, Washington

Old City Hall
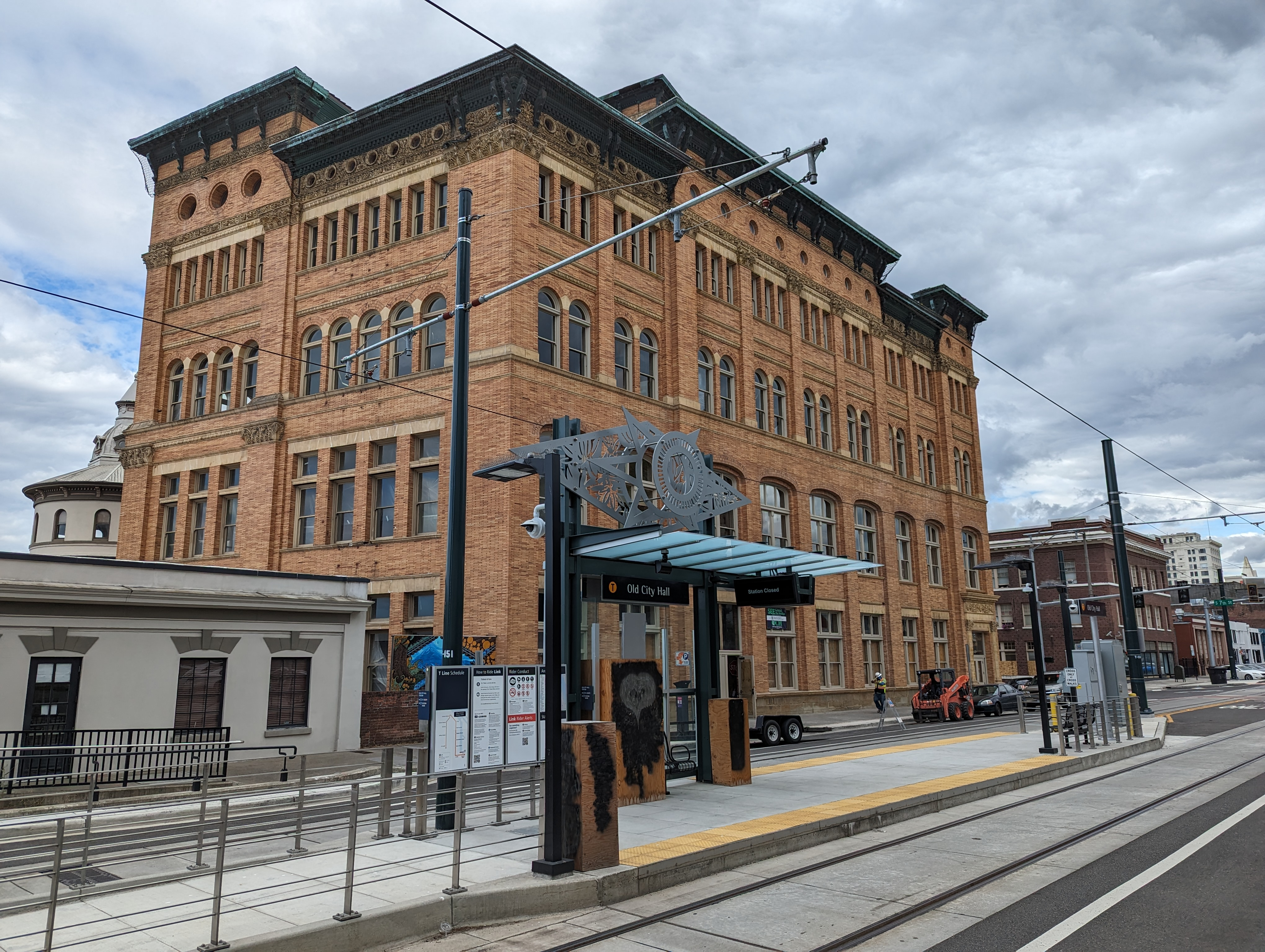
- The station in 2023

General information
- Location: Commerce Street; Tacoma, Washington, U.S.
- Coordinates: 47.25769°N 122.44041°W
- Owner: Sound Transit
- Line: T Line
- Platforms: 1 island platform
- Tracks: 2
- Connections: Pierce Transit

Construction
- Accessible: Yes

History
- Opened: August 22, 2003; September 16, 2023
- Closed: August 1, 2022
- Former names: Theater District/South 9th Street (2003–2022)

Passengers
- 178 daily weekday boardings (2025); 44,995 total boardings (2025)

Services
Preceding station	Sound Transit	Following station
Link
South 4th Street toward St. Joseph	T Line	Theater District toward Tacoma Dome
Location

Old City Hall station is a light rail station on Link light rail's T Line in Tacoma, Washington, United States. The station officially opened for service on September 16, 2023; it is located at the northern end of downtown and named for the Old City Hall building, which it is adjacent to.

The station replaced a station known as Theater District/South 9th Street station, located two blocks to the south. That station officially opened for service on August 22, 2003; it was located at the northern end of downtown and named for the several nearby performing arts venues. The station closed on August 1, 2022, as part of work to connect the T Line with its extension to the Hilltop neighborhood, due to its close proximity with the new Old City Hall station.

Artwork at the original Theater District station reflected the Theater District:

- Seats at the station resembled fold-up theater seats
- Bronze plaques in the ground were reproductions of historical theatrical posters
- Projectors projected theatrical scenes on screens at night
