= Theater District station (Sound Transit) =

Tacoma Link light rail station

Theater District
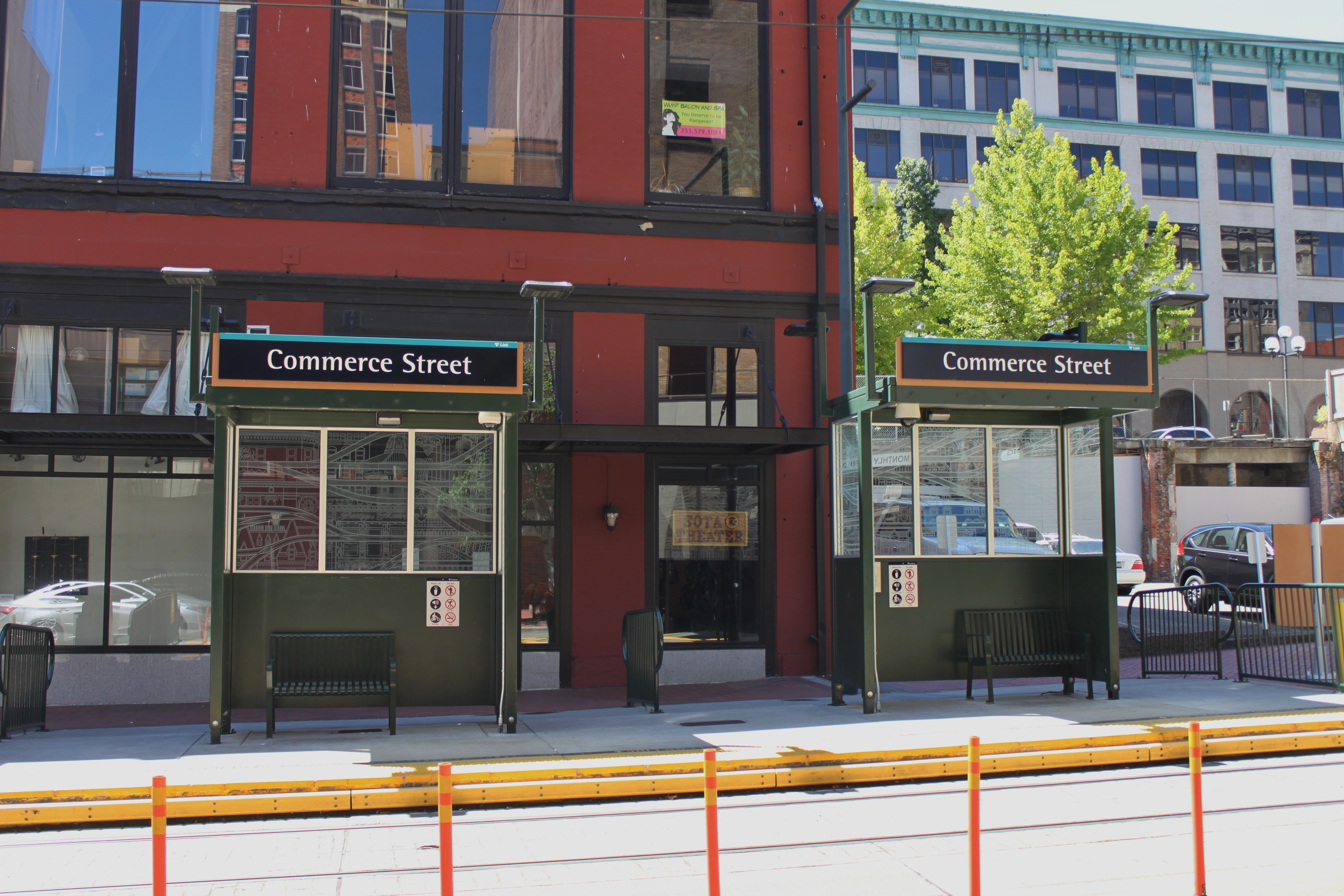
- Southbound platform under the station's previous name

General information
- Location: Commerce Street at South 11th Street; Tacoma, Washington; United States
- Coordinates: 47°15′10″N 122°26′22″W
- Owner: Sound Transit
- Platforms: 2 side platforms
- Tracks: 2
- Connections: Sound Transit Express, Pierce Transit, Intercity Transit

Construction
- Accessible: Yes

History
- Opened: September 15, 2011
- Former names: Commerce Street/South 11th Street (2011–2023)

Passengers
- 438 daily weekday boardings (2025); 110,572 total boardings (2025)

Services
Preceding station	Sound Transit	Following station
Link
Old City Hall toward St. Joseph	T Line	Convention Center/South 15th Street toward Tacoma Dome
Location

Theater District station is a light rail station on Link light rail's T Line in Tacoma, Washington, United States. The station was originally named Commerce Street/South 11th Street station and opened for service on September 15, 2011, as an infill station. It is one block south of the Commerce Street transit mall, served by Sound Transit Express, Pierce Transit and Intercity Transit buses.

A station at South 11th Street was proposed by the City of Tacoma in 2010 and approved by the Sound Transit Board in September 2010. The station was officially named "Commerce Street" by a Sound Transit Board motion passed on July 28, 2011. Construction began in April 2010 and cost approximately $350,000. The station was built with 40-foot (12 m) platforms, approximately half the length of other Tacoma Link stations.

On October 11, 2022, Commerce Street became the northern terminus of Line T following the closure of Theater District/South 9th Street station, which was relocated as part of the Hilltop Extension. Following the completion of the extension on September 16, 2023, Commerce Street was renamed to Theater District; its name was previously used by the South 9th Street station, which was renamed to Old City Hall station after it was moved a block north. The name change was requested by the City of Tacoma and members of the community.
