= Greater Tacoma Convention Center =

Convention center in Tacoma

Coordinates: 47°14′54″N 122°26′20″W

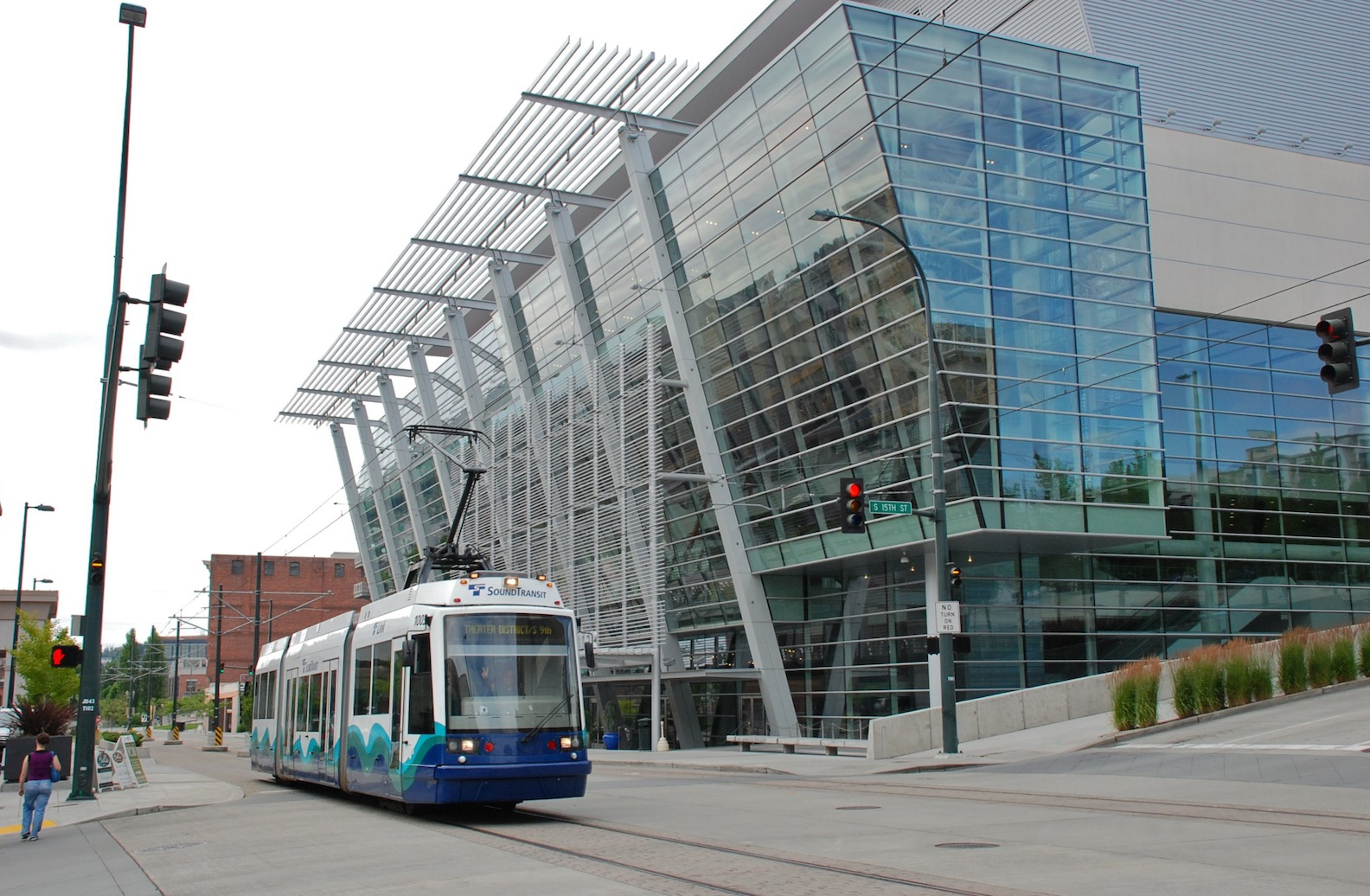
A Tacoma Link car passing the east façade of the convention center, on Commerce Street

The Greater Tacoma Convention Center, is a convention center in downtown Tacoma, in the U.S. state of Washington. It opened in November 2004 and has been described as the "second largest meeting and event facility in Western Washington". It was designed by MulvannyG2 Architecture, of Bellevue, Washington.

Located at 1500 Commerce, the center has over 118,000 square feet (11,000 m^{2}) of meeting and usable prefunction space which includes a 50,000 sq ft (4,600 m^{2}), column-free exhibition hall, a 13,650 sq ft (1,268 m^{2}) ballroom, and eleven breakout rooms in varying sizes. There are 400 parking spaces on-site. The convention center is also served by Tacoma Link at the Convention Center/S. 15th Street station. Buses operated by Pierce Transit also serve the convention center, with stops on nearby Pacific Avenue, as well as on Market Street and on 13th Street.

In September 2010, the Greater Tacoma Convention Center added Commerce Room, a meeting space adding over 1,800 square feet (170 m^{2}) to the center. The Commerce Room can be used by convention groups as an additional breakout room or on its own for smaller events with a capacity for 180 people.
