= Convention Center/South 15th Street station =

Light rail station in Tacoma, Washington, US

Convention Center
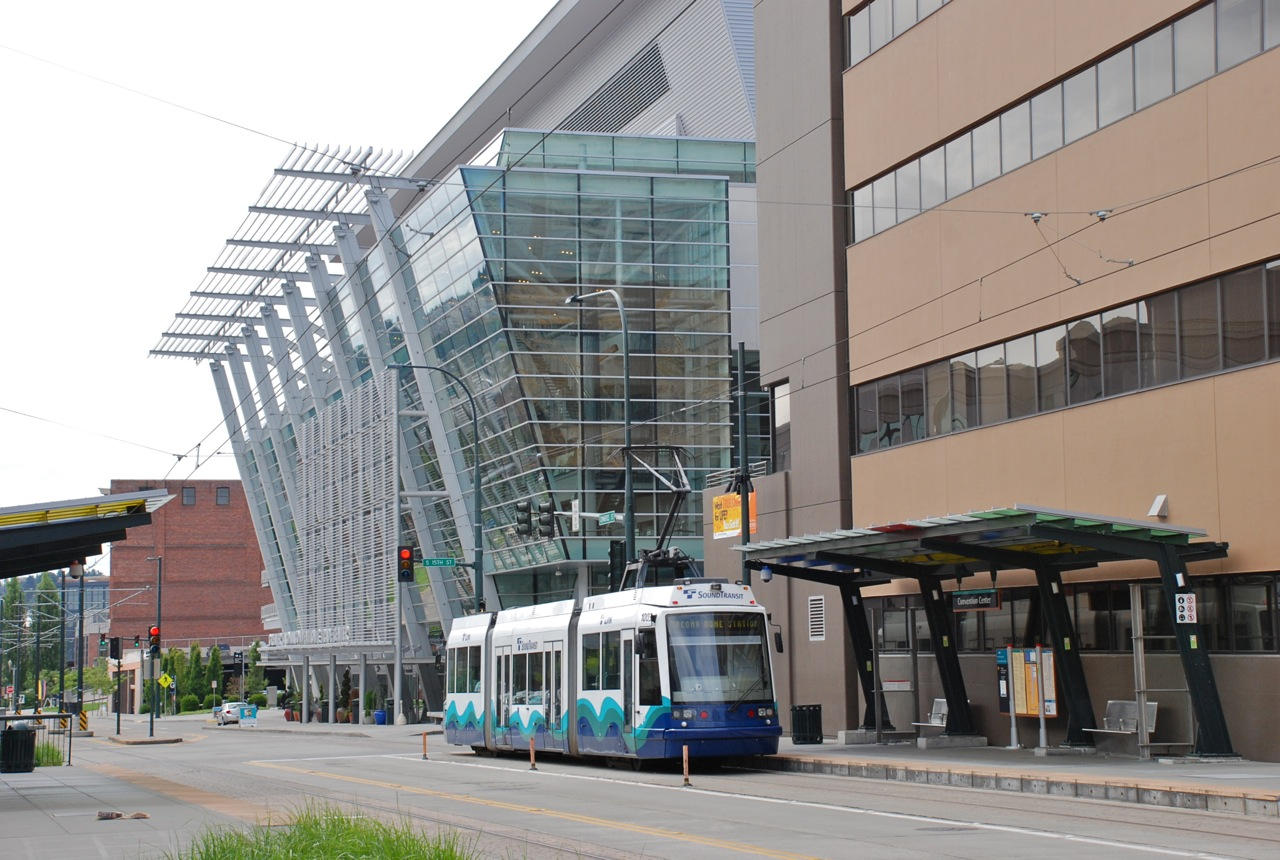
- A southbound Link car leaving Convention Center/South 15th Street station, with the Greater Tacoma Convention Center in the background

General information
- Other names: Convention Center/South 15th Street
- Location: Commerce Street at South 15th Street; Tacoma, Washington; United States
- Coordinates: 47°14′58″N 122°26′19″W
- Owner: Sound Transit
- Platforms: 2 side platforms
- Tracks: 2

Construction
- Accessible: Yes

History
- Opened: August 22, 2003

Passengers
- 155 daily weekday boardings (2025); 39,197 total boardings (2025)

Services
Preceding station	Sound Transit	Following station
Link
Theater District toward St. Joseph	T Line	Union Station/South 19th Street toward Tacoma Dome
Location

Convention Center/South 15th Street station is a light rail station on Link light rail's T Line in Tacoma, Washington, United States. The station officially opened for service on August 22, 2003, and is located almost adjacent to the Greater Tacoma Convention Center. The heart of the downtown business core is also accessible from the station, with several major employers headquartered nearby.

Artwork at the station includes colored panels in the roof and towers of rocks, evoking a Buddhist temple that used to exist in the area.
