= South 25th Street station =

Light rail station in Tacoma, Washington, U.S.

S 25th
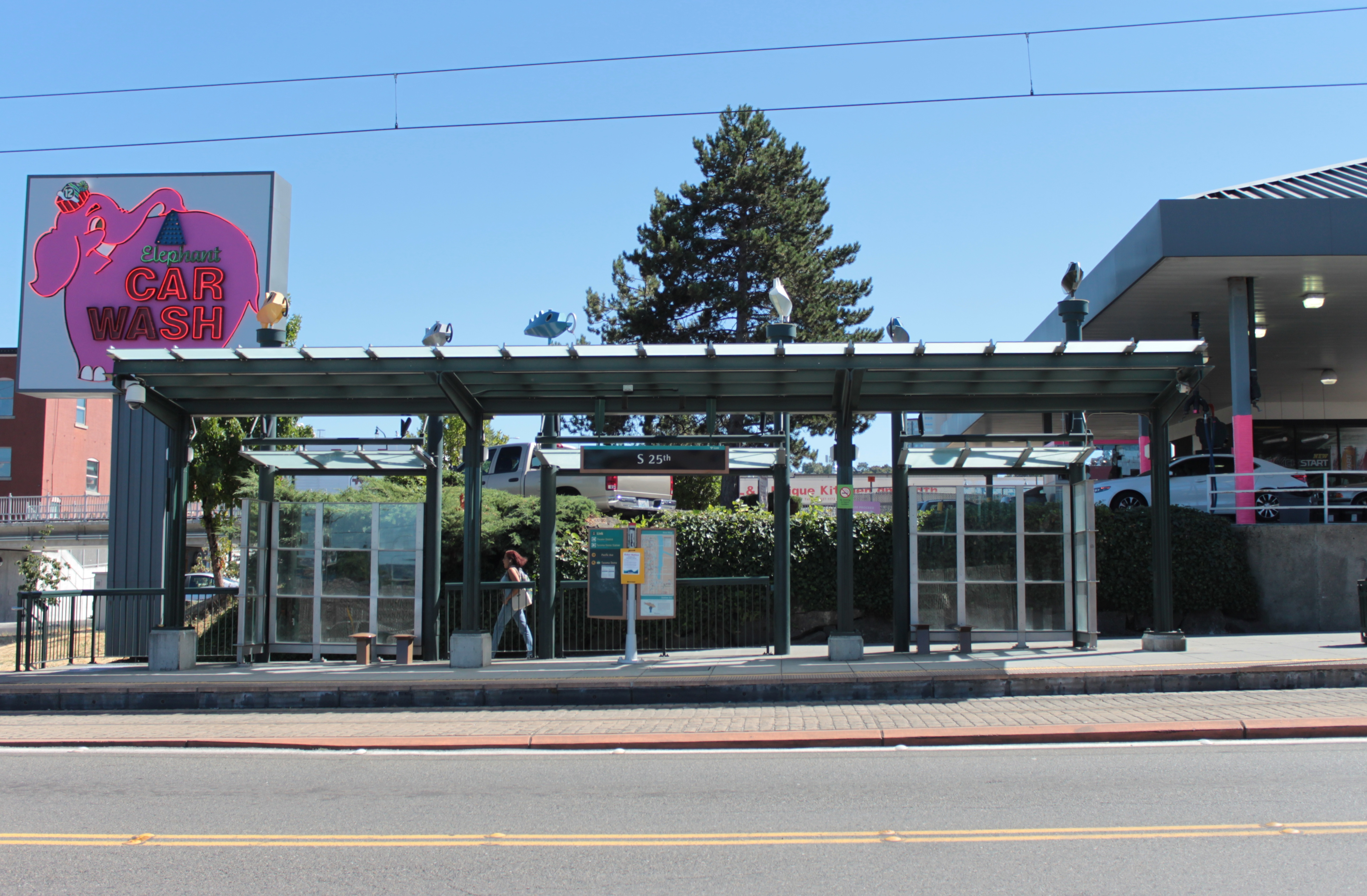
- South 25th Street station platform

General information
- Location: South 25th Street and A Street; Tacoma, Washington; United States
- Coordinates: 47°14′21″N 122°26′03″W
- Owner: Sound Transit
- Platforms: 1 side platform
- Tracks: 1

Construction
- Accessible: Yes

History
- Opened: August 22, 2003

Passengers
- 278 daily weekday boardings (2025); 70,386 total boardings (2025)

Services
Preceding station	Sound Transit	Following station
Link
Union Station/South 19th Street toward St. Joseph	T Line	Tacoma Dome Terminus
Location

South 25th Street station is a light rail station on the T Line, a Link light rail service in Tacoma, Washington, United States. The station opened for service on August 22, 2003, is located at the edge of downtown, and it serves several area parking garages, allowing commuters to ride for free to nearby destinations.

The station consists of a single side platform on the south side of the street, and facilitates transfers to buses on Pacific Avenue. It is located near the Brewery District. Artwork at this station consists mainly of large fishing lures on the roof of the station platform that move in the wind. This is to reflect the fishing lure manufacture that used to take place in the area.
