= Union Station (Tacoma, Washington) =

Historic train station and courthouse in Tacoma, Washington

Union Station Tacoma, WA
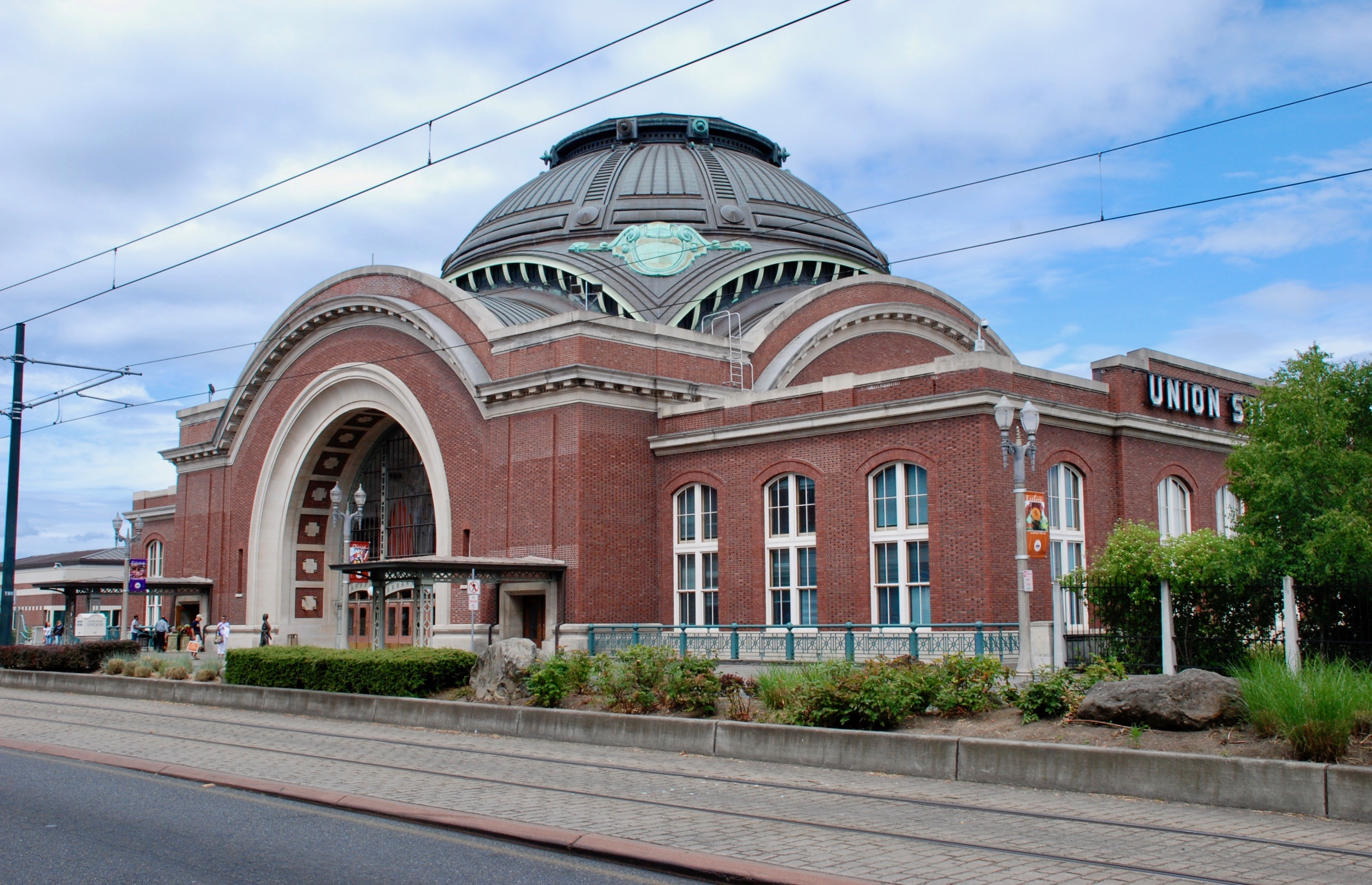
- Front of station, on Pacific Avenue

General information
- Owner: General Services Administration

History
- Opened: May 1, 1911
- Closed: June 14, 1984

Services
Preceding station	Amtrak	Following station
Centralia toward Los Angeles	Coast Starlight	Seattle Terminus
East Olympia toward Chicago	Pioneer	Seattle Terminus
East Olympia toward Portland	Mount Rainier	Seattle Terminus
Preceding station	Great Northern Railway	Following station
Steilacoom Via Point Defiance toward Portland	Portland–Seattle Line	Puyallup toward Seattle
Lakeview Via Prairie Line toward Portland	Portland–Seattle Line	Puyallup toward Seattle
Preceding station	Northern Pacific Railway	Following station
Terminus	Main Line	Puyallup toward St. Paul
Steilacoom Via Point Defiance toward Portland	Portland–Seattle Line	Puyallup toward Seattle
Lakeview Via Prairie Line toward Portland	Portland–Seattle Line	Puyallup toward Seattle
Preceding station	Union Pacific Railroad	Following station
Steilacoom toward Portland	Portland–Seattle Line	North Puyallup toward Seattle
- Union Passenger Station
- U.S. National Register of Historic Places
- U.S. Historic district – Contributing property
- Location within Washington (state) Location within the United States
- Location: 1713 Pacific Ave. Tacoma, Washington
- Coordinates: 47°14′45″N 122°26′11″W
- Area: less than one acre
- Built: 1910
- Architect: Charles A. Reed and Allen H. Stem
- Part of: Union Depot – Warehouse Historic District (ID80004009)
- NRHP reference No.: 74001975
- Added to NRHP: March 15, 1974
Location

The Union Passenger Station in Tacoma, Washington, United States, opened in 1911. It was listed on the National Register of Historic Places in 1974. It now serves as a courthouse of the United States District Court for the Western District of Washington. The distinctive architecture, dominated by a copper dome, is a landmark for the area.

== Building history ==
Tacoma's reputation as the "City of Destiny" began when it was chosen by the Northern Pacific Company in 1873 as the western terminus of the northern route of the transcontinental railroad, then under construction. The city became a center for industrial and commercial development. Its economy expanded rapidly over the next two decades, and its population skyrocketed from just under 2,000 in 1873 to 37,714 in 1890.

The city's first rail station was built in 1883, then moved to the site of the present Union Station on Pacific Avenue and enlarged in 1892. In 1906 the architectural firm of Reed and Stem was selected to design a new station more befitting Tacoma's image as a prosperous, thriving metropolis and railway terminus of the Northwest.

Construction of Union Station began in 1909 and was completed on May 1, 1911. Acclaim for Reed and Stem's design was immediate. The Tacoma Daily Ledger praised it as "the largest, the most modern and in all ways the most beautiful and best equipped passenger station in the Pacific Northwest".

Despite optimistic forecasts by the railroad companies early in the century, the future would not be kind to the passenger rail industry. Railway ridership peaked in the 1930s and again during World War II, then quickly declined as the automobile became America's preferred mode of transportation. The façade of Union Station was damaged by the April 29, 1965, earthquake that struck the Puget Sound region. The station was evacuated after bricks and masonry fell from the building onto the sidewalk in front of Pacific Avenue.

On May 1, 1971, Amtrak took over national passenger services from private railroads, including several operated by the Burlington Northern Railroad (the successor to Northern Pacific) that stopped at Union Station. The Tacoma offices relocated to Seattle and Amtrak built a new Tacoma station on Puyallup Avenue east of Freighthouse Square. The last passenger train left Union Station on June 14, 1984, and the abandoned building soon fell into disrepair. The tracks and 136-foot (41 m) concourse were planned to be demolished to clear room for Interstate 705, a new freeway that would serve Downtown Tacoma. The demolition was opposed by a group called Tacoma Spur Alternatives, which filed a lawsuit to halt the project that it later dropped. Several hours after the lawsuit was dropped on August 3, 1984, demolition of the concourse began.

The station building remained in the ownership of the Glacier Park Company, a subsidiary of Burlington Northern Railroad, which received inquires from department store retailers and WED Enterprises, which proposed an entertainment district centered around the depot. In 1987, Congress authorized the U.S. General Services Administration (GSA) to lease Union Station for 30 years to provide space for the United States District Court for the Western District of Washington. After three years of work, the historic building was completely renovated and restored, and a three-story addition was constructed. The federal courts began occupancy in 1992 and were deemed a successful adaptive use of the landmark train station.

Today, the building is used for courts as well as public and private events. Ownership of the building was transferred to the GSA on August 10, 2022, for $1 following the execution of an option in the 30-year lease. An adjacent light rail station is named after Union Station and serves commuters as part of Tacoma Link.

== Architecture ==
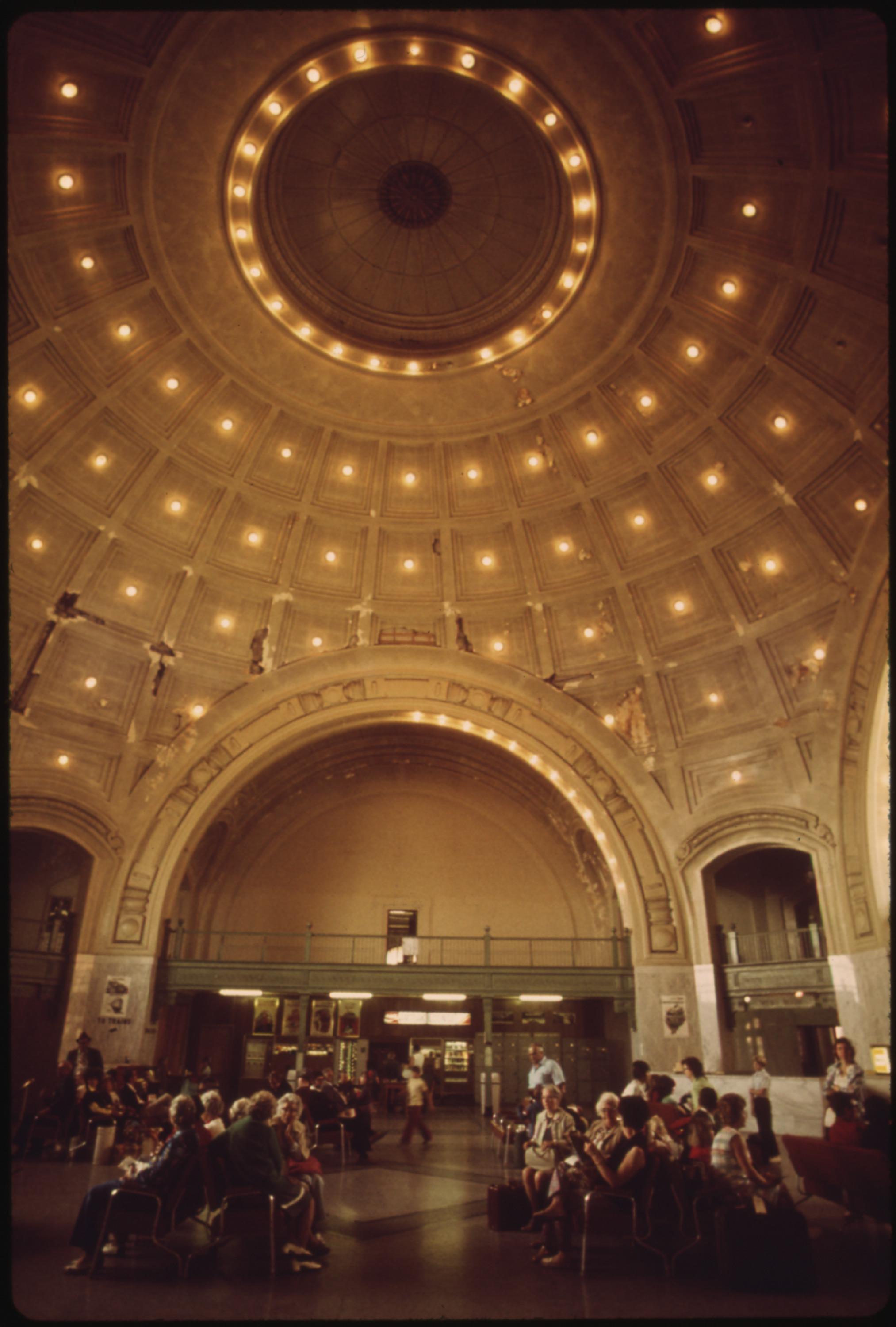
The interior of the rotunda in 1974. Passenger service would continue until 1984.

Tacoma Union Station is an example of Beaux-Arts architecture that combines awe-inspiring elegance with spatial efficiency. The architecture firm, Reed and Stem, were already well known in the field of railroad station design, particularly for their organization of space and movement. At the same time, Union Station was under construction, they collaborated with two other architects to design the Beaux-Arts style Grand Central Terminal in New York City.

The building's focal point is its ninety-foot-high central dome, which is part of the Tacoma skyline. Clad in copper and adorned with four large cartouches, the dome rests on a central pavilion with large arched openings on each side. Flat-roofed symmetrical wings flank the pavilion to the north and south. The exterior of the reinforced-concrete building is faced with multicolored red brick set in a Flemish-bond pattern, with a limestone base and ornamental detail. The entrance doors, of stained oak with bronze hardware, are recessed within the arch on the west elevation. A large window fills the arch above the doors.

The dome creates a rotunda in the building's interior, which is visited by up to 300 people a day during the summer season. Shortly after the building's completion in 1911, the dome's skylight began to leak, causing serious problems during the heavy rains regularly experienced in the Northwest. The skylight was eventually covered over, but the leakage—and the structural and cosmetic damage it caused—continued, growing more severe in the decades that followed. Concerns over falling plaster ultimately prompted officials to close the rotunda to the public in the early 1980s. It remained closed until the building was renovated in the early 1990s for its new use as a federal courthouse. At that time, 40,000 pounds (18,000 kg) of new copper were brought in to recover the dome; holes in its plaster interior, as large as eight square feet (0.74 m^{2}) in size, were painstakingly repaired, and the skylight was reopened.

The rotunda has skylights and houses a collection of glass art by renowned Tacoma artist Dale Chihuly. Suspended from the center of the domed ceiling is Chihuly's 20-foot (6.1 m) chandelier that comprises over 2,700 cobalt-colored, balloon-like glass globes. The rotunda also retains historically significant features, including a large clock, marble water fountains, and wooden benches.

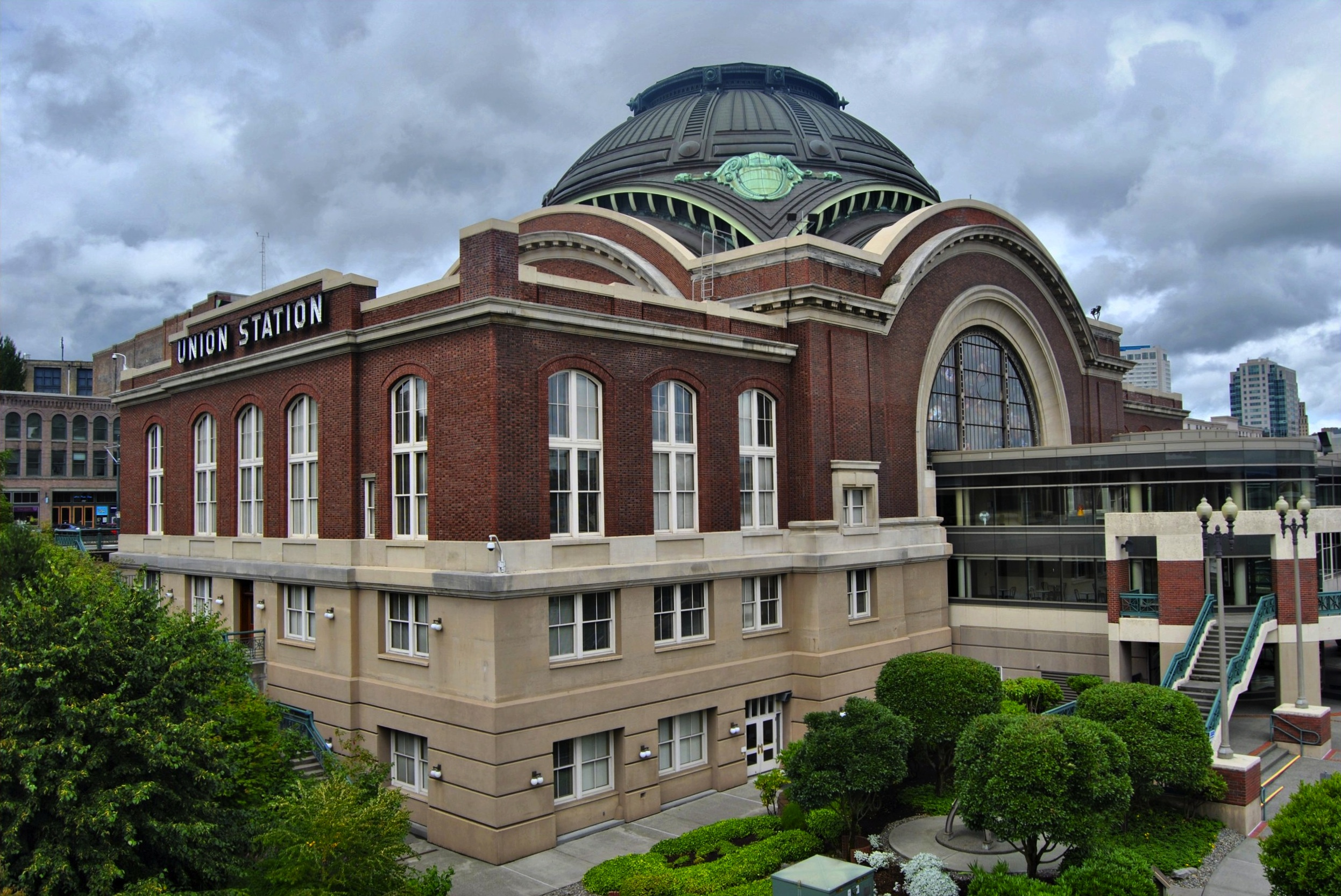
Southside and east side (former track side) of the station in 2011, showing the 1992 addition

Other features of the original design were a pneumatic tube system and elevators installed between the rotunda and the baggage room so that a traveler's luggage would be delivered to the lobby via early 20th century automation.

Most of the railroad tracks and platforms and part of the original concourse were removed during the rehabilitation for the federal courts. A simple, three-story addition, designed by Tacoma architects Merrit and Pardini in collaboration with TRA Architects of Seattle was completed in 1992. The sympathetic addition is located to the north and east of the original building. The two buildings are separated by a courtyard but linked by an interior connector, which extends from the east side of the rotunda.

Ten courtrooms were needed for the federal courts. Two were created within the north and south wings of the 1911 building, while the addition provided eight more. The courtrooms are designed so that each can be used, inter-changeably, for District, Bankruptcy, or Magistrate proceedings.

Union Station was listed on the National Register of Historic Places in 1974. Six years later, a seven-block area surrounding the station, known as the Union Station Warehouse District, was added to the National Register. The renovation and the addition have received several preservation awards.

== Timeline ==
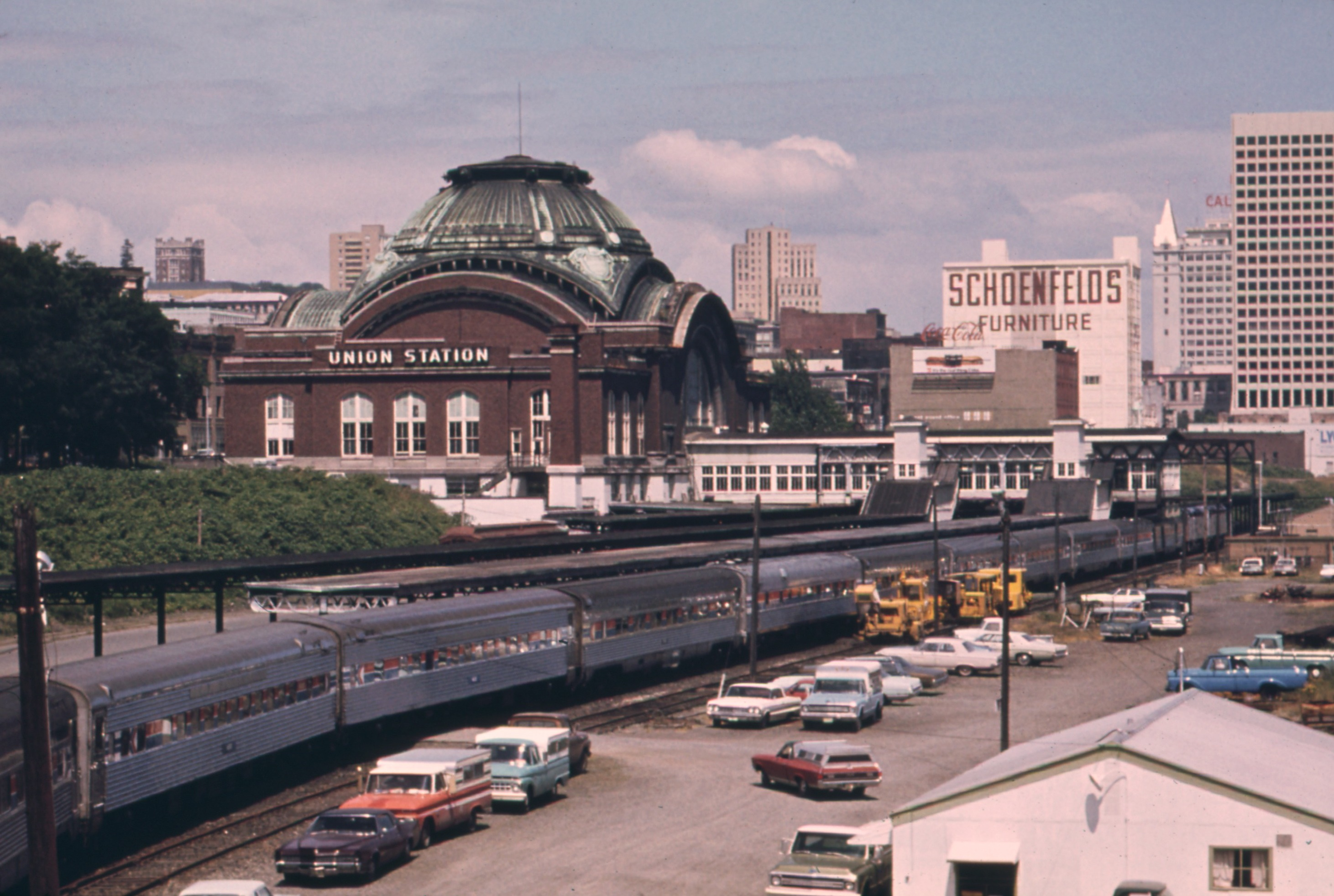
Amtrak's Coast Starlight at Tacoma in 1974.

- 1883: Tacoma's first rail station is built.
- 1892: As railroad use increases, the station is moved to the Pacific Avenue site, and enlarged.
- 1909–1911: Union Station is constructed on the site of the 1892 station.
- 1940s–1960s: As the automobile becomes increasingly popular, the passenger rail industry begins a prolonged decline.
- 1974: Union Station is listed on the National Register of Historic Places.
- 1980: The seven-block area surrounding Union Station is designated a historic district and listed on the National Register of Historic Places.
- 1984: The last passenger train departs from Union Station and the building is abandoned.
- 1987: The U.S. General Services Administration, with Congressional authorization, arranges a 35-year lease of the building from the city of Tacoma.
- 1990–1992: Union Station is rehabilitated and converted for use as a courthouse. An addition provides more space for use by the courts.
- 2003: The Union Station/South 19th Street station opens on Tacoma Link, restoring rail service to the building's location.

== Building facts ==
- Architects: Reed and Stem
- Renovation and Restoration: Merritt+Pardini in association with TRA (The Richardson Associates)
- Courthouse Addition: Merritt+Pardini and Bassetti Norton Metler Rekevics
- Construction Dates: 1909–1911; Courthouse addition: 1992
- Landmark Status: Listed in the National Register of Historic Places; contributing building in the Union Depot-Warehouse Historic District
- Location: 1717 Pacific Avenue
- Architectural Style: Beaux-Arts
- Primary Materials: Brick and concrete with copper roof/dome and limestone trim
- Prominent Features: Ninety-foot copper dome and interior rotunda; Glass art displays by Tacoma native Dale Chihuly

== See also ==
- Milwaukee Road Depot
