= Downtown Tacoma =

Downtown of Tacoma, Washington, U.S.

Coordinates: 47°15′19″N 122°26′26″W

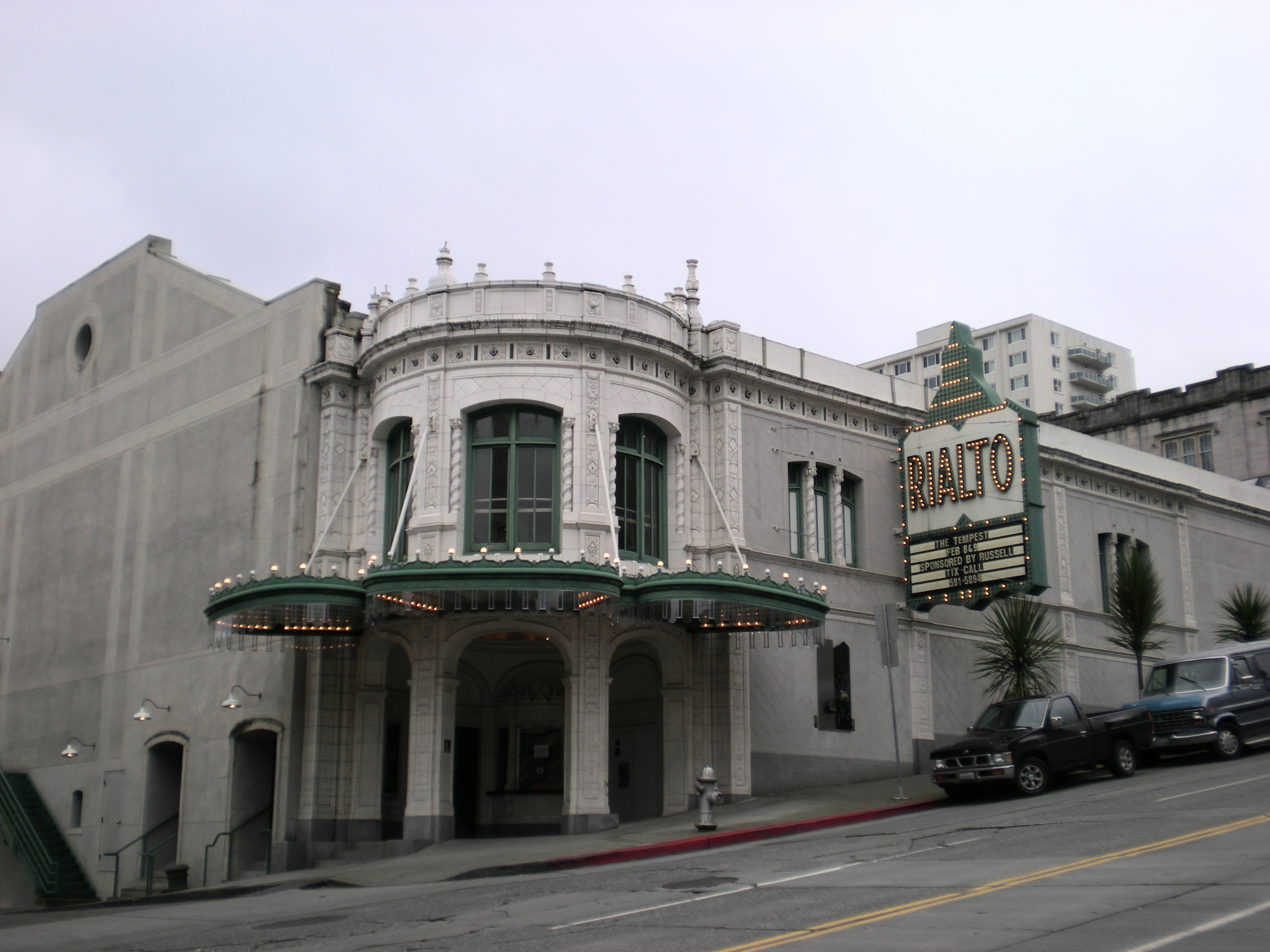
The Rialto Theater, in the heart of downtown Tacoma

Downtown is the central business district of Tacoma, Washington, United States, located in the inner Northeast section of the city. It is approximately bounded east-west by A Street and Tacoma Avenue, and north-south by South 7th Street and South 25th Street. The center of downtown is the intersection of 9th and Broadway.

== History ==
Downtown Tacoma's mid-century downturn was exacerbated by the opening of the Tacoma Mall in the 1960s. Many of the anchor retail stores left downtown to relocate to the mall. Following this exodus of retailers, city leadership attempted to make downtown more appealing to shoppers by building two large parking garages and by closing off to traffic two blocks of Broadway Street between South 9th and South 11th Streets. The Broadway Mall was less successful than hoped and the street was re-opened to traffic during the 1980s.

Later revitalization efforts were centered around the renovation of Union Station in 1990, which became Tacoma's federal courthouse, coupled with the opening of University of Washington Tacoma. The University of Washington rejected a greenfield site for its new South Puget Sound campus and, instead, decided to restore six historic warehouses in a dilapidated district on the edge of downtown Tacoma. Today, the area is a thriving museum and university district. Retail and restaurants have returned and downtown is undergoing a renaissance. The addition of the Museum of Glass, Tacoma Art Museum, and the Washington State History Museum added much life to the area.

The Tacoma City Council passed the Local Improvement District for St. Helens Street in April 2006, which was designed to improve areas which have been neglected. Also central to the revitalization effort has been the city's adoption of the tax exemption for new residential units in multifamily dwellings, primarily apartments and condominiums. Starting in 2002, downtown Tacoma began seeing an increase in the number of residential units being built or renovated downtown. Buildings such as the Perkins Building, Harmon Lofts, and Cliff Street were renovated for living units.

A new regional convention center, the Greater Tacoma Convention Center, opened in 2004.

== Buildings and features ==
Downtown Tacoma is well known for its historic buildings, most built at the end of the 19th century. These include the Old City Hall Building, Union Station, Elks Temple, Bostwick Building, the Winthrop Hotel and the Pythian Temple, which houses Seabury Middle School. The Mecca Theater is currently being restored.

The city's Christmas tree is located in the downtown area.
