= Washington State History Museum =

Washington history museum in Tacoma, Washington

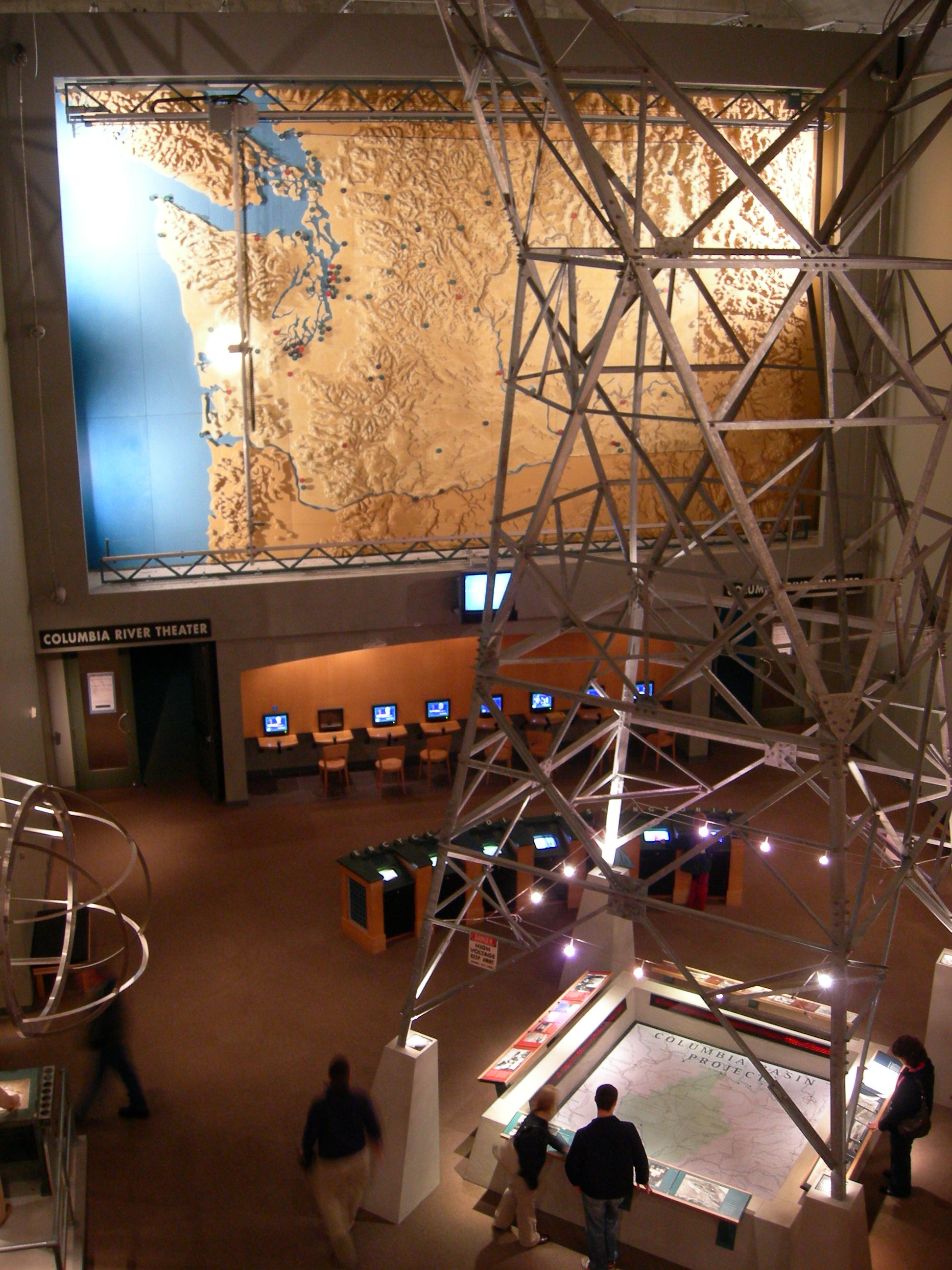
- Established: 1996
- Location: 1911 Pacific Avenue; Tacoma, Washington, U.S.
- Coordinates: 47°14′42″N 122°26′10″W
- Type: History museum
- Director: Nicholas Vann
- Curator: Gwen Whiting
- Website: washingtonhistory.org

The Washington State History Museum is a history museum located in downtown Tacoma, Washington, United States. It is operated by the Washington State Historical Society under the official approval of the Washington State Legislature. The museum opened on August 10, 1996, at a building adjacent to historic Union Station that cost $42 million to construct.

== History ==
Designed by the postmodern architect Charles Moore who "insisted that buildings reflect their setting and their purpose". Opened in August 1996, the state spent five years in construction and preparing for the grand opening.

The grounds of the museum are set in a garden that reflects "the character of the entire state" with "dramatic circles and slopes ... sweeping circular ramp [which] suggests a Cascade mountain switchback, while a dished-out amphitheater seating over 200 people represents the Puget Sound".

== Exhibits ==
=== Permanent exhibits ===
Permanent exhibits feature Boeing history, a Southern Coast Salish plank house, maritime history and information about George Vancouver. Artifacts from the Clovis culture are the oldest objects to be found in the museum.

The top floor is also home to the state's largest permanent model train layout, which covers 1,700 sq ft (160 m^{2}) and recreates scenes from Tacoma's Union Station (which is located next to the museum) and other regional railroads. The museum hosts an annual Model Train Festival in December. Model train clubs set up "elaborate displays" in the museum, the festival runs until the first week of January.

=== Temporary exhibits ===
In 2000 the museum celebrated the 100th anniversary of Mount Rainier National Park with the exhibit "Sunrise to Paradise: The Story of Mount Rainier National Park". The 5,500 square foot exhibit showed the park as an active icon in the natural world, as well as its cultural significance in the region.

The traveling exhibit of Native American quilts from 1920 to 1996 was a temporary exhibit at the museum in July 2000. The quilts were displayed in settings such as on beds to showcase the stories depicted on each quilt. The exhibit was called "To Honor and Comfort: Native Quilting Traditions" and featured 45 North American and Hawaiian quilts.

== Gallery ==
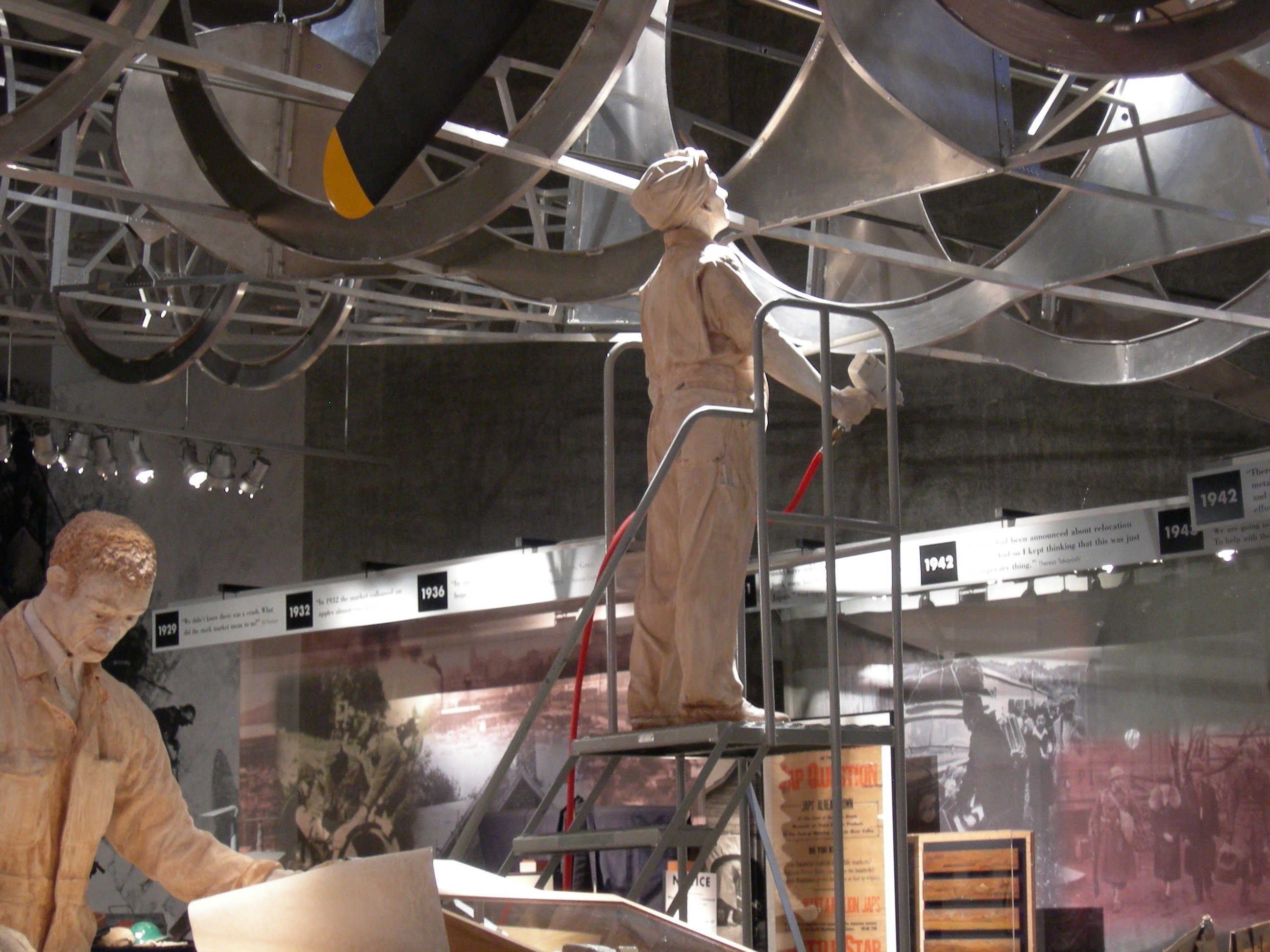
Exhibit on aircraft manufacture

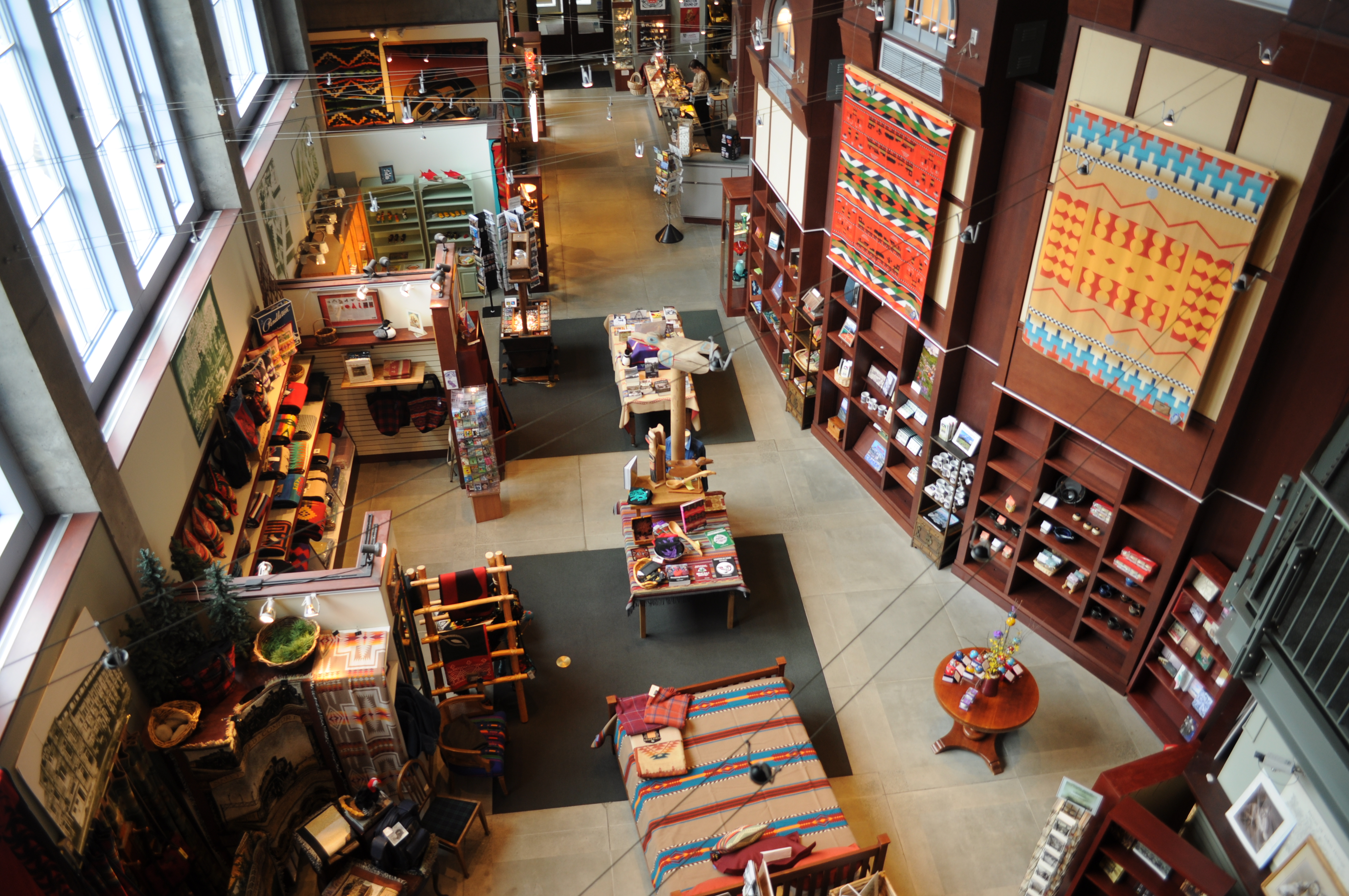
Museum shop

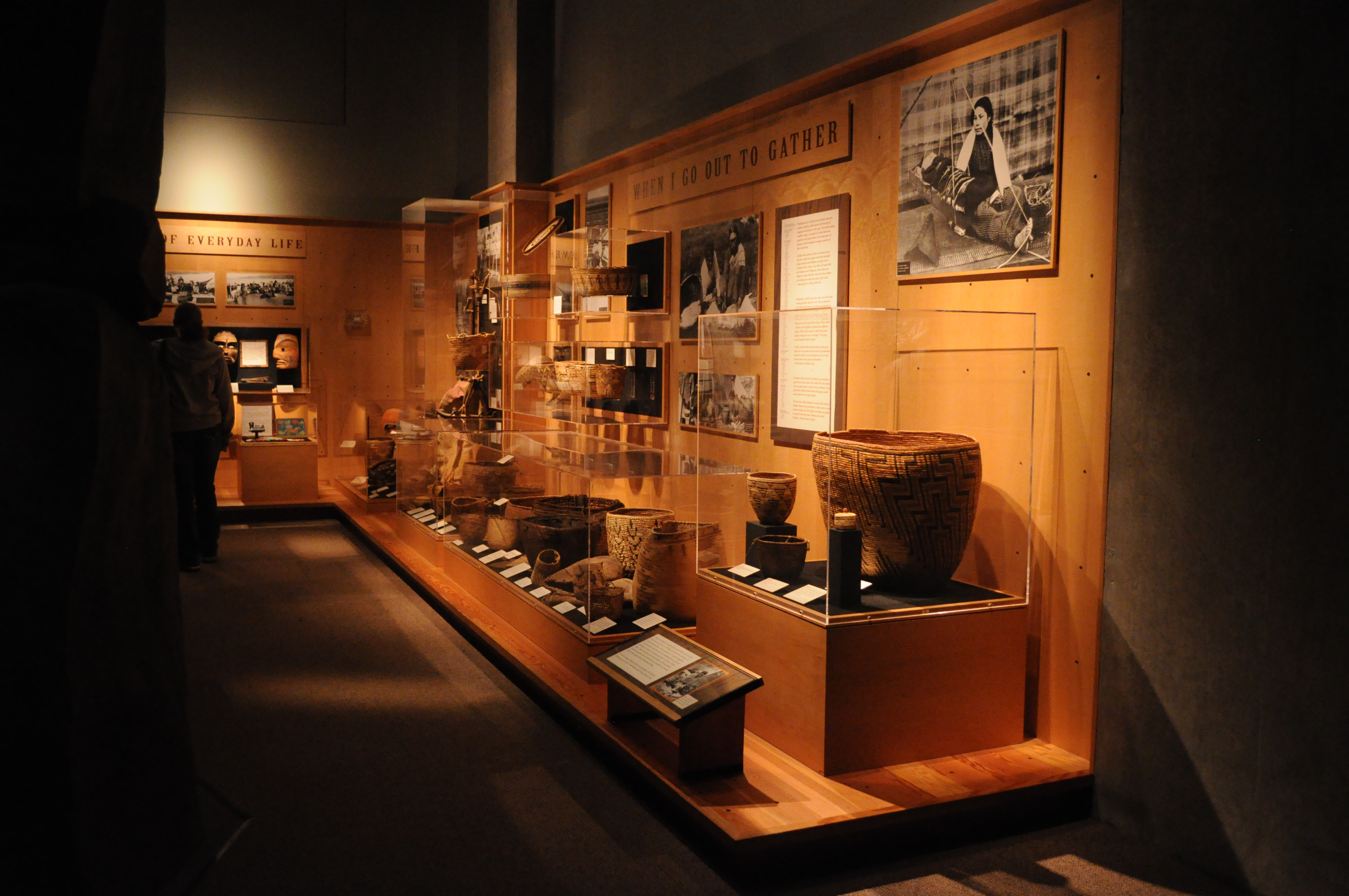
Exhibit of Native American basketry and some other implements

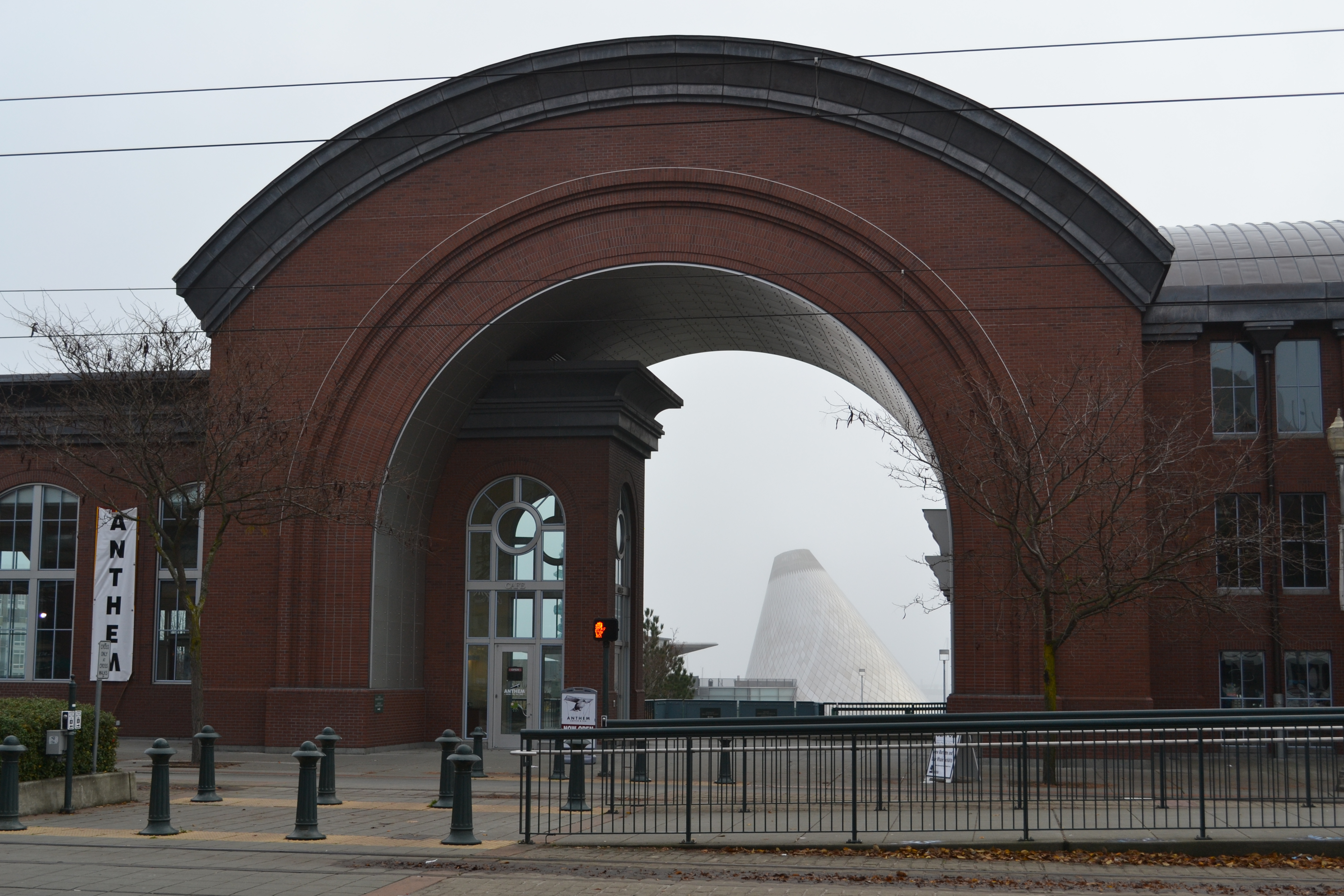
Museum Arch (Tacoma, Washington)

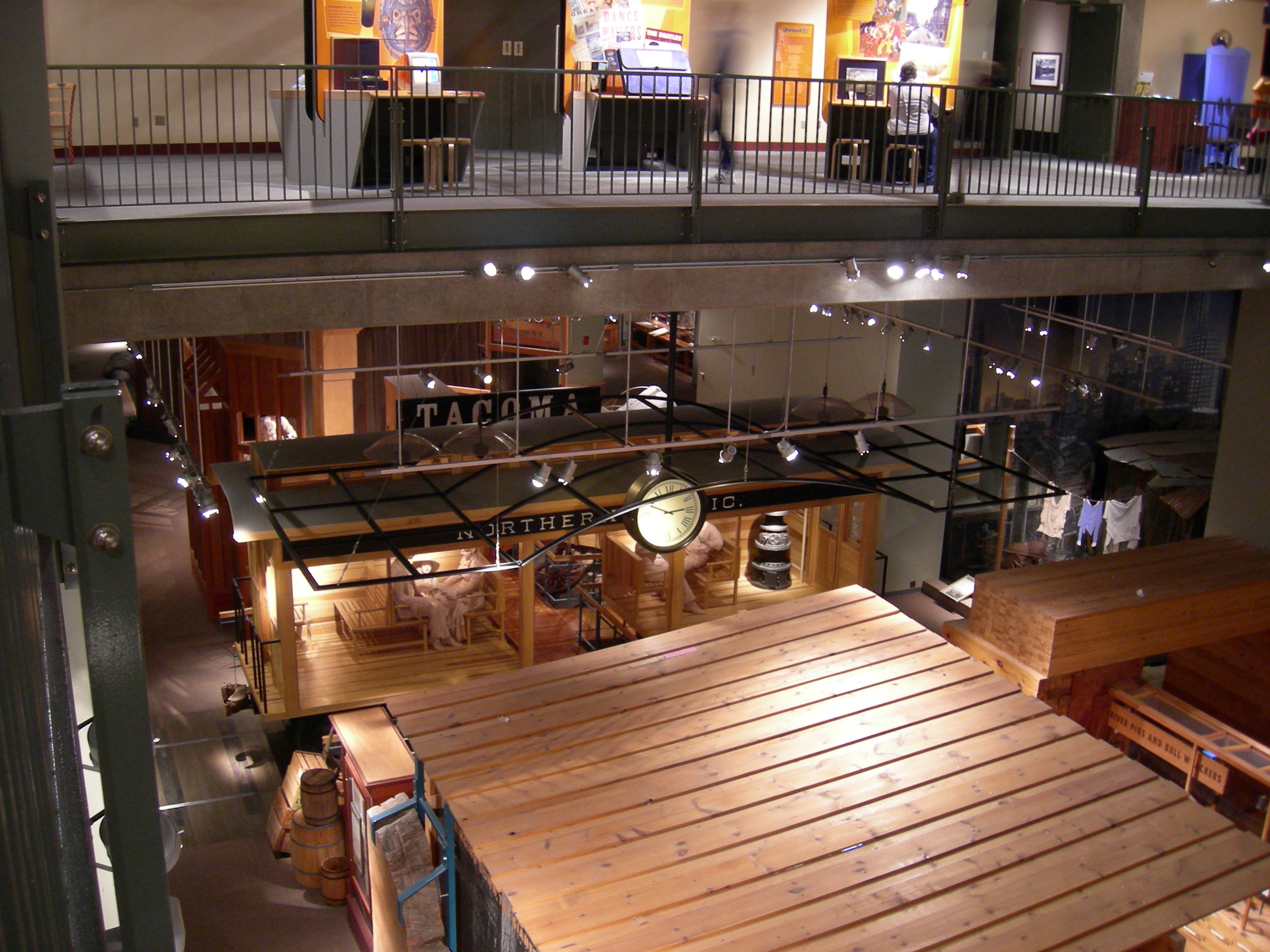
Washington State History Museum

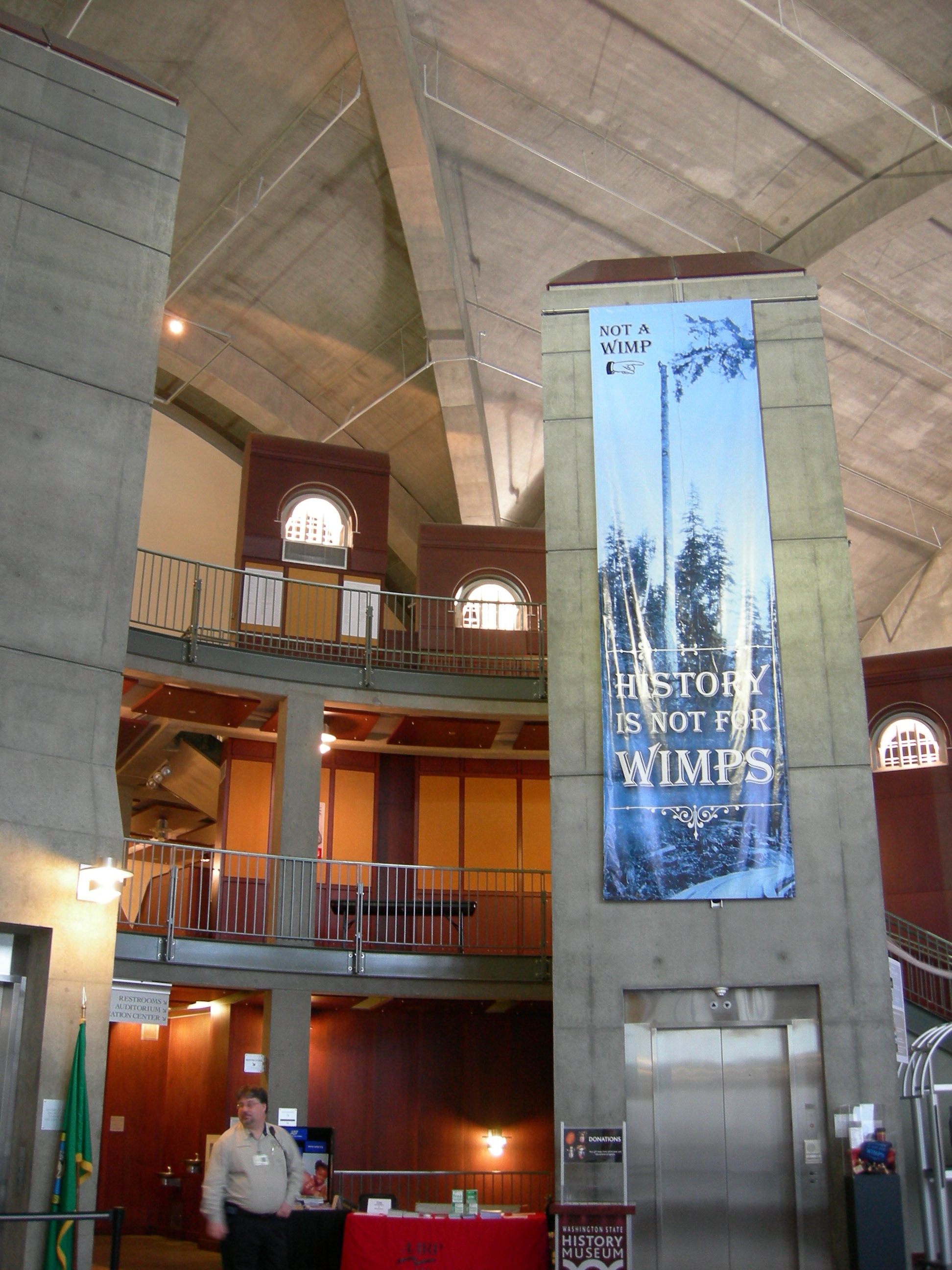
Washington State History Museum lobby. The vaulted roof reflects the nearby Union Station
