= List of Link light rail stations =

Geographic map of the Link light rail system and its 51 stations

Link light rail is a regional light rail system operated by Sound Transit in the Seattle metropolitan area of the U.S. state of Washington. The network consists of three lines with 51 total stations in three counties. The 1 Line runs from Lynnwood through Seattle to Federal Way; the 2 Line from Lynnwood through Seattle and Bellevue to Redmond; and the T Line runs entirely in Tacoma. The 1 Line and 2 Line are sometimes described as a light metro system due to their long trainsets, large stations, and higher capacities; the smaller T Line operates more like a streetcar. In 2025, the system carried 37.8 million passengers, or approximately 117,200 on an average weekday in early 2026.

The first Link segment began service on August 23, 2003, with the opening of five stations on the 1.6-mile-long (2.6 km) Tacoma Link (now the T Line). The initial, 14-mile-long (23 km) segment of Central Link (now the 1 Line) with 12 stations was opened from Seattle to Tukwila on July 18, 2009, and was later extended 1.7 miles (2.7 km) to the Seattle–Tacoma International Airport on December 19, 2009. The first infill station of the Link system was Commerce Street/South 11th Street station on the T Line, which opened on September 15, 2011. The 1 Line was extended north 3.15 miles (5.07 km) to the University of Washington on March 19, 2016, and 1.6 miles (2.6 km) south to Angle Lake station on September 24, 2016. A northern extension to Northgate station with three stations opened on October 2, 2021. The T Line was extended 2.4 miles (3.9 km) in September 2023 with six new stations and one relocated stop. The first section of the 2 Line opened on April 27, 2024, with eight stations in Bellevue and Redmond. Four stations were added to the 1 Line on August 30, 2024, as it was extended to Lynnwood. Three more stations were added to the 1 Line on December 6, 2025, extending the line South to Federal Way. Two more stations opened on the 2 Line on March 28, 2026, connecting that line to the 1 Line across Lake Washington. An infill station at Pinehurst opened on September 30, 2026.

Further expansions approved by Sound Transit 3 in 2016 are planned to expand the light rail network by 58 miles (93 km) and 39 stations to a total of 116 miles (187 km) of track and 83 stations by 2044, carrying 500,000 daily passengers. The light rail network will include lines to Ballard and West Seattle in Seattle in 2039 and 2032, respectively; Kirkland and Issaquah on the Eastside in 2044; and extensions to Everett and Tacoma in 2041 and 2032, respectively. Three infill stations in Seattle and Tukwila will also be built as part of the Sound Transit 3 program.

All 1 Line and 2 Line stations are built with 380-to-400-foot-long (120 to 120 m), 14-inch-high (0.36 m) platforms, arranged in the center or sides of the two tracks, with capacity to handle a four-car train with 95-foot-long (29 m) vehicles; T Line stations are built with 90-foot-long (27 m), 8-inch-high (0.20 m) platforms that can accommodate a one-car train measuring 66 feet (20 m) in length. The majority of stations are built at-grade on the surface, with the platform elevated slightly above street level; there are also elevated stations and underground stations that include mezzanines (with the exception of Mount Baker station) with access the platform from the surface as well as ticket vending machines and bicycle facilities. Only four current stations (Angle Lake, Northgate, Tacoma Dome Station, and Tukwila International Boulevard) have public park and rides; planned stations on the suburban extensions of Link will incorporate new or existing park and rides.

All stations include works of public art as part of the "STart" program, which requires one percent of station construction funds go to art installations. The stations are named in accordance to facility naming guidelines that include using surrounding neighborhoods and street names, avoiding words used by existing facility names, and being limited to 30 characters in compliance with the Americans with Disabilities Act. Stations are also required by state law to be identified by other symbols, excluding those on the T Line. Initially these were simple pictograms, known as "Stellar Connections", that are used in station signage, maps and other printed materials as a wayfinding aid; the icons are composed of points that correspond with local landmarks near Link stations, while also forming a picture that represents the station's identity. They were replaced by three-digit station codes that were implemented with the opening of the Lynnwood extension in August 2024.

== Link stations ==
Key to tables
†	Terminal station
*	Future infill station
^	Future provisional station (Note: Refers to stations that are not funded under current financial plans)

=== Current stations ===
List of current Link light rail stations
Code	Station	Line(s)	Location	Opened (Note: Refers to when the station opened for Link light rail use; stations in the Downtown Seattle Transit Tunnel opened on September 15, 1990, for use by buses.)	Daily ridership (Note: Weekday boardings as of 2025)	Connections and notes (Note: Only includes rail, ferry, and bus rapid transit connections)	Ref.
—N/a	6th Avenue	T Line	Hilltop, Tacoma	September 16, 2023	198		
65	Angle Lake	1 Line	SeaTac	September 24, 2016	5,000	RapidRide	
56	Beacon Hill	1 Line	Beacon Hill, Seattle	July 18, 2009	3,005		
58	Bellevue Downtown	2 Line	Downtown Bellevue	April 27, 2024	1,303	RapidRide	
61	BelRed	2 Line	Bel-Red, Bellevue	April 27, 2024	461		
49	Capitol Hill	1 Line; 2 Line	Capitol Hill, Seattle	March 19, 2016	9,715	First Hill Streetcar	
58	Columbia City	1 Line	Columbia City, Seattle	July 18, 2009	2,334		
—N/a	Convention Center/S 15th St	T Line	Downtown Tacoma	August 23, 2003	155		
65	Downtown Redmond †	2 Line	Redmond	May 10, 2025	1,476	RapidRide	
57	East Main	2 Line	Surrey Downs, Bellevue	April 27, 2024	208		
68	Federal Way Downtown †	1 Line	Federal Way	December 6, 2025	3,500	RapidRide	
—N/a	Hilltop District	T Line	Hilltop, Tacoma	September 16, 2023	338		
53	International District/Chinatown (Note: International District/Chinatown station was renamed from International District station by the Metropolitan King County Council on October 19, 2004.)	1 Line; 2 Line	Chinatown–International District, Seattle	July 18, 2009	5,701	Sounder (at King Street); Amtrak; First Hill Streetcar	
54	Judkins Park	2 Line	Central District, Seattle	March 28, 2026	—N/a		
66	Kent Des Moines	1 Line	Midway, Kent	December 6, 2025	770	RapidRide	
40	Lynnwood City Center †	1 Line; 2 Line	Lynnwood	August 30, 2024	4,330	Swift	
64	Marymoor Village	2 Line	Redmond	May 10, 2025	549		
55	Mercer Island	2 Line	Mercer Island	March 28, 2026	—N/a		
57	Mount Baker	1 Line	Mount Baker, Seattle	July 18, 2009	2,575		
41	Mountlake Terrace	1 Line; 2 Line	Mountlake Terrace	August 30, 2024	1,612		
45	Northgate	1 Line; 2 Line	Northgate, Seattle	October 2, 2021	4,213		
—N/a	Old City Hall	T Line	Downtown Tacoma	September 16, 2023	178		
60	Othello	1 Line	NewHolly, Seattle	July 18, 2009	2,606		
62	Overlake Village	2 Line	Overlake, Redmond	April 27, 2024	477		
44	Pinehurst	1 Line; 2 Line	Pinehurst, Seattle	September 30, 2026			
52	Pioneer Square	1 Line; 2 Line	Pioneer Square, Seattle	July 18, 2009	3,558	RapidRide; Washington State Ferries; Kitsap Fast Ferries; King County Water Taxi	
61	Rainier Beach	1 Line	Rainier Beach, Seattle	July 18, 2009	1,778		
63	Redmond Technology	2 Line	Overlake, Redmond	April 27, 2024	898	RapidRide	
46	Roosevelt	1 Line; 2 Line	Roosevelt, Seattle	October 2, 2021	3,993		
64	SeaTac/Airport	1 Line	SeaTac	December 19, 2009	10,118	RapidRide	
42	Shoreline North/185th	1 Line; 2 Line	Shoreline	August 30, 2024	1,311	Swift	
43	Shoreline South/148th	1 Line; 2 Line	Shoreline	August 30, 2024	1,535		
55	SODO	1 Line	SoDo, Seattle	July 18, 2009	2,055		
—N/a	South 4th	T Line	Stadium District, Tacoma	September 16, 2023	68		
—N/a	S 25th	T Line	Tacoma	August 23, 2003	278		
56	South Bellevue	2 Line	Bellevue	April 27, 2024	902		
60	Spring District	2 Line	Spring District, Bellevue	April 27, 2024	637		
—N/a	St. Joseph †	T Line	Hilltop, Tacoma	September 16, 2023	398		
54	Stadium	1 Line	SoDo, Seattle	July 18, 2009	2,003		
—N/a	Stadium District	T Line	Stadium District, Tacoma	September 16, 2023	423		
67	Star Lake	1 Line	Kent	December 6, 2025	659		
51	Symphony (Note: Symphony station was renamed from University Street station on August 30, 2024.)	1 Line; 2 Line	Downtown Seattle	July 18, 2009	5,261	RapidRide	
—N/a	Tacoma Dome †	T Line	Tacoma	August 23, 2003	773	Sounder; Amtrak	
—N/a	Tacoma General	T Line	Hilltop, Tacoma	September 16, 2023	112		
—N/a	Theater District (Note: Theater District station was renamed from Commerce Street/South 11th Street station in 2023. The original Theater District station was replaced by Old City Hall station.)	T Line	Downtown Tacoma	September 15, 2011	438		
63	Tukwila International Boulevard	1 Line	Tukwila	July 18, 2009	3,880	RapidRide	
47	U District	1 Line; 2 Line	University District, Seattle	October 2, 2021	7,526		
—N/a	Union Station/S 19th St	T Line	Downtown Tacoma	August 23, 2003	549		
48	University of Washington	1 Line; 2 Line	University District, Seattle	March 19, 2016	5,827		
50	Westlake	1 Line; 2 Line	Downtown Seattle	July 18, 2009	12,548	Seattle Center Monorail; South Lake Union Streetcar; RapidRide	
59	Wilburton	2 Line	Wilburton, Bellevue	April 27, 2024	276	RapidRide	

=== Former stations ===
Theater District/South 9th Street station was closed in 2022 as part of the Hilltop extension of the T Line, which relocated the platform to Old City Hall station.

List of former Link light rail stations
Code	Station	Line(s)	Location	Opened	Closed	Ref.
—N/a	Theater District/S 9th St	T Line	Downtown Tacoma	August 23, 2003	August 1, 2022	

=== Planned stations ===
The Sound Transit 3 program, approved by voters in 2016, is planned to expand the Link light rail network to over 116 miles (187 km) and 70 stations when completed in 2050.

List of future Link light rail stations
Station (Note: Station names are for planning purposes and subject to change.)	Line(s)	Project	Location	Projected completion	Ref.
Ainsworth	T Line	TCC Link Extension	Tacoma	2043	
Alaska Junction †	3 Line	West Seattle Link Extension	West Seattle	2035	
Ash Way	2 Line; 3 Line	Everett Link Extension	North Lynnwood	2037 or 2041	
Ballard †	1 Line	Ballard Link Extension	Ballard, Seattle	2042 or 2060	
Boeing Access Road *	1 Line	—N/a	Tukwila	2031	
Central Issaquah †	4 Line	South Kirkland–Issaquah Link Extension	Issaquah	2050	
Delridge	3 Line	West Seattle Link Extension	Delridge, Seattle	2035	
Denny	1 Line	Ballard Link Extension	Denny Triangle, Seattle	2042	
Eastgate	4 Line	South Kirkland–Issaquah Link Extension	Eastgate, Bellevue	2050	
Everett Station †	3 Line	Everett Link Extension	Downtown Everett	2037 or 2041	
Fife	1 Line	Tacoma Dome Link Extension	Fife	2035	
Graham Street *	1 Line	—N/a	Rainier Valley, Seattle	2031	
Interbay	1 Line	Ballard Link Extension	Interbay, Seattle	2042 or 2060	
Lakemont ^	4 Line	South Kirkland–Issaquah Link Extension	Bellevue	TBD	
Mariner †	2 Line; 3 Line	Everett Link Extension	Everett	2037 or 2041	
Midtown	1 Line	Ballard Link Extension	Downtown Seattle	2042	
Pearl	T Line	TCC Link Extension	Tacoma	2043	
Portland Ave	1 Line	Tacoma Dome Link Extension	Tacoma	2035	
Richards Road	4 Line	South Kirkland–Issaquah Link Extension	Eastgate, Bellevue	2050	
Seattle Center	1 Line	Ballard Link Extension	Lower Queen Anne, Seattle	2042	
Smith Cove	1 Line	Ballard Link Extension	Interbay, Seattle	2042 or 2060	
South Federal Way	1 Line	Tacoma Dome Link Extension	Federal Way	2035	
South Kirkland †	4 Line	South Kirkland–Issaquah Link Extension	Kirkland	2050	
South Lake Union	1 Line	Ballard Link Extension	South Lake Union, Seattle	2042	
Sprague	T Line	TCC Link Extension	Tacoma	2043	
SR 99/Airport Road ^	3 Line	Everett Link Extension	Everett	TBD	
SR 526/Evergreen	3 Line	Everett Link Extension	Everett	2037 or 2041	
Stevens	T Line	TCC Link Extension	Tacoma	2043	
SW Everett Industrial Center	3 Line	Everett Link Extension	Everett	2037 or 2041	
Tacoma Community College †	T Line	TCC Link Extension	Tacoma	2043	
Union	T Line	TCC Link Extension	Tacoma	2043	
West Alderwood	2 Line; 3 Line	Everett Link Extension	Lynnwood	2037 or 2041	
