= 2018 Washington Initiative 1639 =

Initiative Measure No. 1639
- November 6, 2018
- Concerns firearms

Results
Choice	Votes	%
Yes	1,839,475	59.35%
No	1,259,681	40.65%
Total votes	3,099,156	100.00%
Registered voters/turnout	4,362,459	71.04%

Yes
80–90%
70–80%
60–70%
50–60%
No
70–80%
60–70%
50–60%
- Source: November 6, 2018 General Election Results, Washington State Secretary of State, archived from the original on March 11, 2025

Initiative 1639 was a Washington state ballot initiative concerning firearms regulation that was passed into law on November 6, 2018. The initiative altered the gun laws in Washington by defining the term "semiautomatic assault rifle" to include all semiautomatic rifles, raising the minimum age for purchasing semiautomatic rifles from 18 to 21. It also imposes a 10-day waiting period before being allowed to claim a rifle from a firearms dealer, and expanded background checks to include medical records requiring a waiver of HIPAA rights.

== Scope and impact ==
Initiative 1639 was passed into law by a vote of 59 percent to 41 percent in a public referendum that took place on November 6, 2018. The initiative concerned the regulation of firearms and made several amendments to state law: the minimum age of purchase of semiautomatic rifles was raised from 18 to 21, the extent of mandatory background checks for semiautomatic weapons purchasers was expanded, and requirements for home storage of firearms were established. The restrictions created by the legislation did not extend to single-shot or bolt-action rifles and the new regulations generally mirrored those already in place for handguns. According to The Seattle Times it was the most "ambitious" gun control legislation in the history of the state.

The increased age limit for "semiautomatic assault firearm" purchases went into effect on January 1, 2019, but the provision defining such firearms did not go into effect until July 1, 2019, along with other provisions of the law.

== Campaign ==
The petition drive to place the initiative on the 2018 general election ballot raised $5.3 million, with funding coming from Microsoft co-founder Paul Allen, former Microsoft CEO Steve Ballmer, and others. The proposed initiative was also supported by state Attorney General Bob Ferguson, who had previously proposed a statewide ban on semi-automatic rifles in response to the 2016 Mukilteo shooting. The National Rifle Association of America (NRA) and other groups opposed to the measure raised approximately $600,000 to campaign against it. Questions about whether the form of the petitions submitted by initiative backers complied with state law resulted in the measure being temporarily blocked from the ballot by order of the Thurston County Superior Court, though a subsequent ruling by the Washington State Supreme Court quashed the lower court injunction.

== Results ==
Initiative Measure 1639 passed with 59.35% voting Yes and 40.65% voting No, with 1,839,475 Yes votes and 1,259,681 No votes, out of a total of 3,099,156 votes cast.

2018 Washington Initiative 1639
Choice	Votes	%
For	1,839,475	59.35
Against	1,259,681	40.65
Total	3,099,156	100.00
Source: Washington Secretary of State

=== By county ===
County results
County	Yes		No		Margin		Total votes
County	#	%	#	%	#	%	Total votes
Adams	1,499	35.55%	2,718	64.45%	-1,219	-28.91%	4,217
Asotin	3,944	43.11%	5,204	56.89%	-1,260	-13.77%	9,148
Benton	29,438	39.14%	45,781	60.86%	-16,343	-21.73%	75,219
Chelan	15,255	45.21%	18,488	54.79%	-3,233	-9.58%	33,743
Clallam	19,937	50.18%	19,795	49.82%	142	0.36%	39,732
Clark	104,953	54.01%	89,382	45.99%	15,571	8.01%	194,335
Columbia	681	30.58%	1,546	69.42%	-865	-38.84%	2,227
Cowlitz	17,229	38.56%	27,457	61.44%	-10,228	-22.89%	44,686
Douglas	5,608	37.30%	9,426	62.70%	-3,818	-25.40%	15,034
Ferry	962	27.21%	2,574	72.79%	-1,612	-45.59%	3,536
Franklin	8,984	40.26%	13,332	59.74%	-4,348	-19.48%	22,316
Garfield	366	27.05%	987	72.95%	-621	-45.90%	1,353
Grant	8,558	32.21%	18,008	67.79%	-9,450	-35.57%	26,566
Grays Harbor	12,052	42.07%	16,598	57.93%	-4,546	-15.87%	28,650
Island	23,644	55.93%	18,633	44.07%	5,011	11.85%	42,277
Jefferson	14,183	67.78%	6,742	32.22%	7,441	35.56%	20,925
King	732,773	76.42%	226,117	23.58%	506,656	52.84%	958,890
Kitsap	69,283	57.20%	51,850	42.80%	17,433	14.39%	121,133
Kittitas	8,290	42.60%	11,168	57.40%	-2,878	-14.79%	19,458
Klickitat	4,332	40.11%	6,468	59.89%	-2,136	-19.78%	10,800
Lewis	10,187	29.82%	23,974	70.18%	-13,787	-40.36%	34,161
Lincoln	1,392	24.91%	4,197	75.09%	-2,805	-50.19%	5,589
Mason	12,372	44.52%	15,418	55.48%	-3,046	-10.96%	27,790
Okanogan	6,082	36.18%	10,728	63.82%	-4,646	-27.64%	16,810
Pacific	4,897	44.80%	6,034	55.20%	-1,137	-10.40%	10,931
Pend Oreille	2,089	30.15%	4,840	69.85%	-2,751	-39.70%	6,929
Pierce	177,774	54.41%	148,948	45.59%	28,826	8.82%	326,722
San Juan	7,964	71.71%	3,142	28.29%	4,822	43.42%	11,106
Skagit	28,675	52.53%	25,917	47.47%	2,758	5.05%	54,592
Skamania	2,230	39.54%	3,410	60.46%	-1,180	-20.92%	5,640
Snohomish	189,709	58.89%	132,435	41.11%	57,274	17.78%	322,144
Spokane	116,609	50.89%	112,512	49.11%	4,097	1.79%	229,121
Stevens	6,100	26.86%	16,608	73.14%	-10,508	-46.27%	22,708
Thurston	71,705	57.43%	53,141	42.57%	18,564	14.87%	124,846
Wahkiakum	862	35.28%	1,581	64.72%	-719	-29.43%	2,443
Walla Walla	12,172	47.44%	13,483	52.56%	-1,311	-5.11%	25,655
Whatcom	66,032	60.20%	43,649	39.80%	22,383	20.41%	109,681
Whitman	9,427	54.33%	7,923	45.67%	1,504	8.67%	17,350
Yakima	31,226	44.17%	39,467	55.83%	-8,241	-11.66%	70,693
Totals	1,839,475	59.35%	1,259,681	40.65%	579,794	18.71%	3,099,156

=== By congressional district ===
"Yes" won seven of ten congressional districts.

District	Yes	No	Representative
1st	59%	41%	Suzan DelBene
2nd	62%	38%	Rick Larsen
3rd	47%	53%	Jaime Herrera Beutler
4th	39%	61%	Doc Hastings
5th	48%	52%	Cathy McMorris Rodgers
6th	57%	43%	Derek Kilmer
7th	85%	15%	Pramila Jayapal
8th	53%	47%	Kim Schrier
9th	75%	25%	Adam Smith
10th	56%	44%	Denny Heck

== Legal challenges ==
=== Lawsuit ===
A lawsuit seeking to have the law overturned was filed in federal court by the National Rifle Association and the Second Amendment Foundation. In August 2020, this challenge was dismissed in Federal court. As of August 31, 2020, this challenge was handed over to the 9th Circuit Court of Appeals.

=== Enforcement refusals ===
==== Background ====
The Revised Code of Washington establishes the state's 39 sheriffs as the "chief executive officer and conservator of the peace" of their respective counties and charges each to "keep and preserve the peace in their respective counties, and quiet and suppress all affrays, riots, unlawful assemblies and insurrections" and to "defend the county against those who ... endanger the public peace or safety".

In what has been described as an "atypical" situation, a number of county sheriffs have gone on record stating they do not intend to apply the provisions of Initiative 1639 in their counties. Some sheriffs have said they believe Initiative 1639 violates Article I, Section 24 of the Constitution of Washington, which says:

The right of the individual citizen to bear arms in defense of himself, or the state, shall not be impaired, but nothing in this section shall be construed as authorizing individuals or corporations to organize, maintain or employ an armed body of men.

Others have said the law is incongruous in that it would prohibit private ownership of semiautomatic firearms by 18-, 19-, and 20-year-old military veterans who were otherwise determined qualified to bear them by the United States Armed Forces as indicated by their military service. Still other sheriffs have said provisions of the legislation requiring certain measures of home security for privately owned firearms are either impossible to enforce in practice, or are a violation of the Fourth Amendment to the United States Constitution, which prohibits "unreasonable search".

On February 12, Washington Attorney General Bob Ferguson issued an open letter to law enforcement refusing to enforce the initiative. Ferguson wrote that Initiative 1639 should be presumed constitutional as "no court has ruled that this initiative is unconstitutional." Ferguson said if law enforcement refused to perform enhanced background checks on semiautomatic rifle purchases as required by the initiative, they could be held liable if a prohibited individual gets a gun and uses it in a crime. The sheriffs of Franklin and Lincoln counties said that the required background checks would be performed, despite their belief that the initiative is unconstitutional.

==== Disposition of sheriffs ====
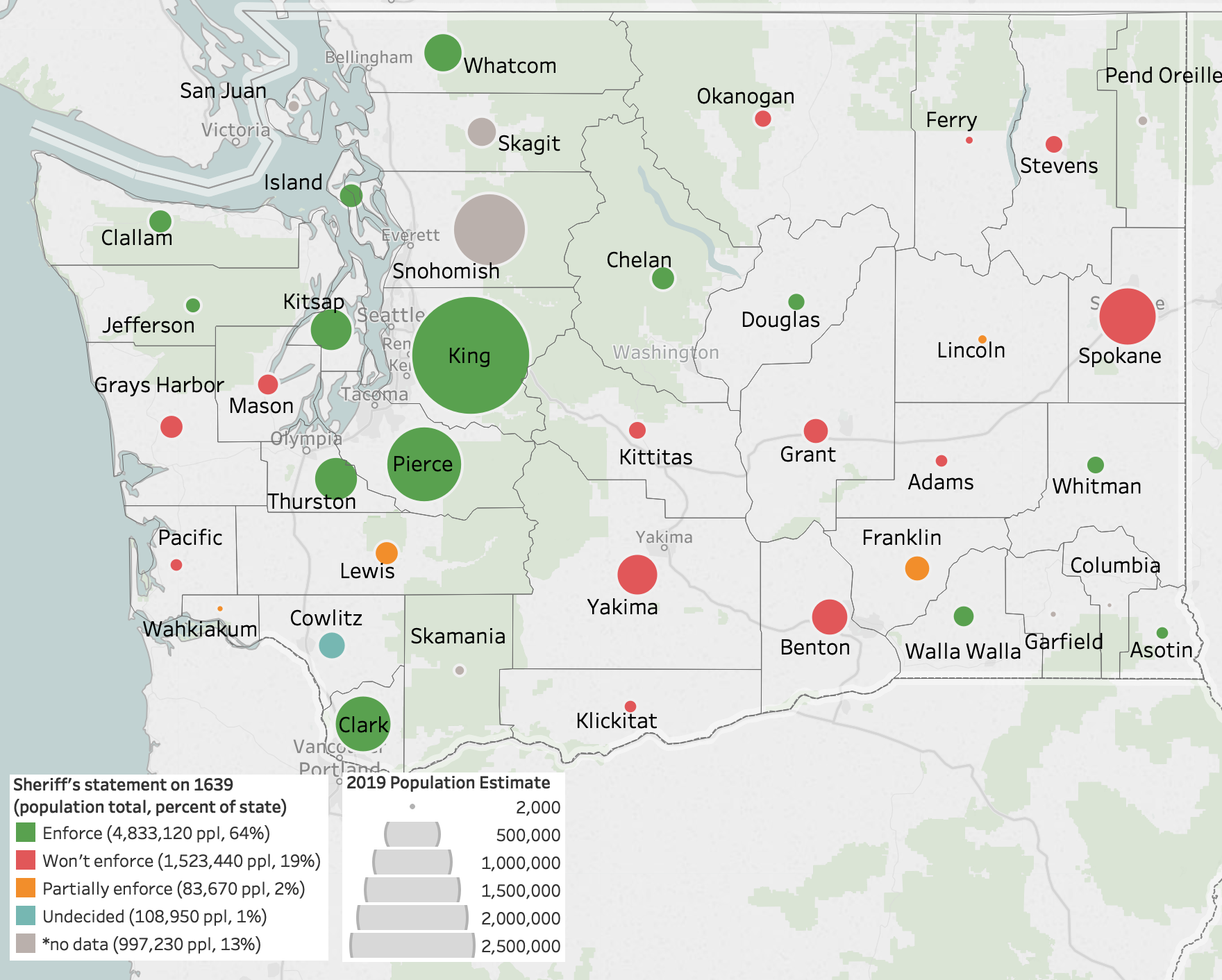
Positions of sheriffs on I-1639, showing population of county by size. Color shows whether they will enforce the law (green), not enforce it (red), partially enforce it (orange), are undecided (blue), or if no data is available (gray)

As of February 2019, the sheriffs of 12 of Washington's 39 counties — specifically Adams, Benton, Ferry, Grant, Grays Harbor, Kittitas, Klickitat, Mason, Okanogan, Pacific, Stevens, and Yakima counties, representing 1.5 million people, or 19% of the state's 7.5 million population — said they will not enforce the law, though some have indicated they will only refuse to do so until the final adjudication of pending lawsuits against the legislation.

The sheriff of Spokane County said he will not enforce the law, but accused other sheriffs who similarly stated they would not enforce it of "grandstanding".

The sheriffs of Lewis and Wahkiakum counties said they will apply the law in cases where they are aware it was transgressed, but would not take any steps to actively seek out or investigate violators. After warnings from the State Attorney General, two sheriffs who had initially said they would not enforce it, of Franklin, and Lincoln counties, said they would perform the background checks required by the law.

The sheriff of Cowlitz County has said he is undecided about whether or not to apply the law in his county.

The sheriffs of 13 counties, with a total population of 4.8 million, or 64% of the state, specifically Asotin, Chelan, Clallam, Clark, Douglas, Island, Jefferson, King, Pierce, Thurston, Walla Walla, Whatcom, and Whitman counties, said they will enforce the law, though several said they personally opposed it.

==== Public reaction ====
In an editorial, The News Tribune denounced sheriffs who refused to apply the law as "agitators" and accused them of rebellion, writing that the sheriffs who said they would refuse to enforce the law were usurping the legislative and judicial role. In an editorial, the Walla Walla Union-Bulletin described Initiative 1639 as a "lousy" law but said the sheriffs of the state's counties should enforce it, a position also taken by the Moscow-Pullman Daily News.

In early February 2019, several pseudonymous Facebook posts threatened to assassinate sheriffs who refused to enforce the law, specifically naming Spokane County Sheriff Ozzie Knezovich. A representative of the Alliance for Gun Responsibility, which campaigned for the legislation, condemned the threats.
