= Law of Washington =

Law of Washington may refer to:

- Law of Washington (state)
- Law of Washington, D.C.
