= Washington Law =

Washington Law or Washington law may refer to:

== Law of Washington ==
- Law of Washington (state)
- Law of Washington, D.C.

== Washington law schools ==
- University of Washington School of Law, Seattle, Washington
- Washington University School of Law, St. Louis, Missouri
- American University Washington College of Law, Washington, D.C.
- George Washington University Law School, Washington, D.C.
