= Sound Transit fleet =

Rolling stock and buses for Sound Transit

Sound Transit is a regional public transit system in the Seattle metropolitan area that provides light rail, commuter rail, and express bus service. As of 2025, the system has a fleet of over 558 vehicles for its services, which carry over 42 million passengers annually. These include 226 rail cars on Link light rail; 78 passenger cars and 14 locomotives on Sounder commuter rail; and 240 buses on Sound Transit Express. The entire fleet is accessible per requirements from the federal Americans with Disabilities Act of 1990, with low-floor light rail vehicles and buses as well as ramps for commuter trains. Sound Transit's trains and buses share the same livery design, known as the "wave", comprised of blue, teal, and green stripes over a white background.

The Link light rail fleet is divided between four models: the Series 1 and Series 2 on the main network, which use 95-foot (29 m) multiple-unit cars; and two generations of shorter streetcars for the T Line in Tacoma. The Series 1 and Series 2 are able to run with multiple cars, up to four per train, and are powered by an overhead catenary powered at 1,500 volts. They are operated by King County Metro and maintained at two facilities in Seattle and Bellevue. The T Line streetcars, maintained directly by Sound Transit, operate as single cars and are powered by an overhead catenary at 700 volts. Sounder uses bilevel passenger cars on its two lines that are maintained by Amtrak and operated by BNSF Railway. Sound Transit Express is contracted out to three local transit agencies and uses a variety of bus types that include articulated and double-decker models. These buses have between 37 and 82 coach-style seats and the largest can carry up to 101 passengers.

== Link light rail ==
The Link light rail system spans 63 miles (101 km) on three lines that serve 50 stations in King, Pierce, and Snohomish counties. It uses a fleet of 226 electric light rail vehicles (LRVs) that are articulated and low floor for accessibility. The vehicles are either operated as single cars (for the T Line) or in trains of up to four cars (for the 1 Line and 2 Line). All trains use standard gauge track and are supplied with electricity through an overhead catenary. The catenary is energized at 1,500 volts direct current for the 1 Line and 2 Line, and 750 volts for the T Line. Due to differences in size and electrical systems, the T Line fleet is incompatible with the rest of the system. The 1,500 V DC system, not used by other North American light rail systems, was chosen for the 1 Line and 2 Line to allow for fewer substations to be constructed and spaced one mile (1.6 km) apart.

The 1 Line and 2 Line, sometimes described as light metro lines, have station platforms that are 380 feet (120 m) long and 14 inches (36 cm) above the top of the rail, allowing for level boarding of trains. These lines use a mixed fleet of LRVs that were later given designations: the Series 1 by Kinkisharyo–Mitsui in Japan; and the Series 2 (S700) by Siemens Mobility in the United States. Both are 95 feet (29 m) long with a pair of operator cabs and an articulated center; they are able to run in a four-car configuration in normal service and eight-car sets in emergencies. Until 2016, Link trainsets were limited to two cars in normal service but were gradually lengthened as more cars became available. The T Line fleet consists of eight low-floor streetcars that are 66 feet (20.12 m) long and are not coupled into longer trains in regular service. It was produced by two manufacturers, Škoda Transportation in the Czech Republic and Brookville Equipment in the United States. All Link cars feature seats in both longitudinal and transverse configurations, standing room, and accessible seating areas that can be folded up for wheelchair users. The original cloth fabric upholstery on the seats were replaced with vinyl in the 2020s in response to feedback from riders and a pilot program that was conducted in 2024.

=== Series 1 ===
The Series 1 cars, numbered 101 to 162, comprise 62 total LRVs that were manufactured by a joint venture of Kinkisharyo and Mitsui in Osaka, Japan. Each car has 74 seats arranged primarily in transverse pairs as well as four areas with longitudinal folding seats also designated for use by wheelchairs and strollers. The listed capacity of the Series 1 is 194 passengers during normal loads, with a maximum "crush load" of 252 people. The layout is 70 percent low floor, at a height of 14 inches (36 cm) above the rails, with raised sections at each end above a set of stairs. The Series 1 cars have four doors on each side and a hanging bicycle hook above each of the luggage storage areas between the articulated sections. Each car has three trucks—two powered at each end near the operator's cab and one unpowered in the center—with two axles and six wheels. The Series 1 has a top speed of 58 miles per hour (93 km/h), but trains typically operate at a maximum of 55 mph (89 km/h) in service.

The original order from Sound Transit for 31 vehicles manufactured by Kinkisharyo–Mitsui was approved in November 2003 at a total cost of $108.6 million (equivalent to $182 million in 2025 dollars). Other bidders included Bombardier, AnsaldoBreda, CAF USA, and Siemens. The Kinkisharyo–Mitsui contract included an option for up to 31 additional vehicles, of which four were ordered in October 2005 for the extension to SeaTac/Airport station. The final order of 27 vehicles was approved in July 2008 for the University Link Extension at a total cost of $94.6 million (equivalent to $139 million in 2025 dollars). Kinkisharyo–Mitsui manufactured the steel shell of the cars and assembled the Japanese components at their facility in Osaka before being shipped to the United States. The final assembly, including wheels, propulsion systems, and seats, was completed at a leased facility in Everett to comply with Buy America requirements; the Everett facility was able to finish two cars per month that were then trucked to Seattle. The first Series 1 car was unveiled in December 2006 and entered service in July 2009 with the opening of Central Link (now the 1 Line). The final two cars were delivered in August 2011. Following the debut of the Series 2 vehicles in 2021, refurbishment of the Series 1 fleet to add automatic train protection and other features began. Woojin Industrial Systems was selected as the contractor for the refurbishment in 2022 and is scheduled to complete work on the first car in 2026.

=== Series 2 ===
The Series 2 cars, numbered 201 to 352, comprise 152 LRVs built by Siemens Mobility in Sacramento, California. Based on the Siemens S700, which was retroactively renamed from the S70, each car is double-articulated and includes operator cabs on each end. Each Series 2 train has 74 seats and has a listed capacity of 240 passengers; like the Series 1, it has two powered trucks at the ends and one unpowered truck in the center. The interior includes larger windows than the Series 1, four bicycle hooks, more longitudinal seating, onboard fire extinguishers, and under-seat luggage storage in the raised sections. The articulated section has 14 seats and a 41-inch (100 cm) aisle—8 inches (20 cm) wider than the Series 1, which needed more space for utility and ventilation systems. The cars also feature interior passenger information screens and colored lights around the doors to indicate opening and closing sequences. The Series 2 has a top speed of 65 miles per hour (105 km/h) and a regular acceleration and deceleration rate of 3.0 miles per hour per second (1.34 m/s).

A large expansion of the Link fleet was funded by the Sound Transit 2 program, approved in 2008, to support the network's expansion and maintain service levels. A request for proposal was issued in November 2015 for 122 low-floor LRVs with Kinkisharyo and Siemens as finalists. Sound Transit awarded the Series 2 contract to Siemens Mobility in September 2016 with a total of 122 LRVs and an option for 30 additional cars for $517.6 million (equivalent to $680 million in 2025 dollars). The option for 30 cars was approved in April 2017 and followed by an additional 10 cars in November 2023, bringing the total contract to $836.9 million (equivalent to $882 million in 2025 dollars). Manufacturing of the first steel S700 shell at the Siemens plant in Sacramento began in December 2017 and the first LRV was delivered to Sound Transit in June 2019 to begin 1,000 miles (1,600 km) of burn-in testing. The first Series 2 trains entered passenger service on May 14, 2021, after delivery of the first 41 LRVs needed for the opening of the Northgate Link Extension. The final car in the original order of 152 LRVs is scheduled to be delivered in 2026 and followed by the completion of the additional order in 2028.

=== Tacoma ===
The T Line uses shorter low-floor articulated streetcars that are 66 feet (20.12 m) long, 8 feet (2.44 m) wide, and have two articulation joints at each end of the low-floor section. The cars and platforms are built for level boarding, with a mechanical wheelchair ramp deployed by operators upon request. The first three streetcars are Škoda 10 Ts, numbered 1001 to 1003, that have 30 seats and can carry 56 total passengers at crush load. The first generation were manufactured in the Czech Republic by Škoda Transportation and Inekon Trams under a joint contract with the Portland Streetcar that was awarded in 1999. The overhead pantograph was lengthened to accommodate the higher catenary height on the T Line. The Škoda cars were delivered in September 2002 at the Port of Tacoma and entered service in August 2003.

To prepare for the Hilltop Link Extension, Sound Transit ordered five Liberty streetcars from Brookville Equipment in 2017 at a cost of $26.5 million. The order also had an option for ten more streetcars, split between Sound Transit and the Portland Streetcar. The Liberty streetcars, numbered 2001 to 2005, each have 26 seats and can carry a total of 100 passengers; they also have designated spaces for bicycles and interior passenger information screens. They were manufactured in Brookville, Pennsylvania, and delivered between March and November 2022. The Liberty streetcars entered service in July 2023.

In 2025, Sound Transit and the City of Portland, Oregon, proposed a swap of their streetcars due to the compatibility of their respective rolling stock as well as operational needs. Three of the newer Liberty cars on the Portland Streetcar system would move to Tacoma, while the older Škoda cars would be sent to Portland alongside a $16.6 million payment and spare parts. The Sound Transit board approved the plan on December 18, 2025.

=== Specifications ===
Link light rail fleet specifications
Designation	Series 1	Series 2	Tacoma (1st generation)	Tacoma (2nd generation)
Manufacturer	Kinkisharyo–Mitsui (Japan)	Siemens (United States)	Škoda–Inekon (Czech Republic)	Brookville (United States)
Model	Low Floor LRV	S700	10T	Liberty NXT
Image				
Fleet numbers (Qty.)	101–162 (62)	201–352 (152)	1001–1003 (3)	2001–2005 (5)
Year(s) delivered	2006–2011	2021–2027	2002	2022
Type	Double-ended articulated car, 6 axle, multiple-unit operation to 4 cars		Double-ended articulated car, single-unit	
Height (top of car to rail)	12.29 ft (3.75 m)	12.7 ft (3.9 m)	11.25 ft (3.43 m)	11 ft (3.4 m)
Center aisle floor height	14 in (36 cm)	14 in (36 cm)	14 in (36 cm)	13.75 in (34.9 cm)
Width (exterior)	8.7 ft (2.7 m)	8.69 ft (2.65 m)	8.08 ft (2.46 m)	8 ft (2.4 m)
Low floor percentage	70%	70%	50%	71%
Length (over coupler faces)	95 ft (29 m)	95 ft (29 m)	66 ft (20.13 m)	66.42 ft (20.24 m)
Weight (empty)	102,000 lb (46,000 kg)	103,400 lb (46,900 kg)	63,500 lb (28,800 kg)	63,960 lb (29,010 kg)
Maximum speed	58 mph (93 km/h)	65 mph (105 km/h)	42 mph (68 km/h)	44 mph (71 km/h)
Traction power	Overhead line, 1,500 V DC		Overhead line, 700 V DC	
Motors	4 motors, each 190 hp (140 kW)	4 motors, each 174 hp (130 kW)	4 motors, each 115 hp (86 kW)	4 motors, each 133 hp (99 kW)
Passenger seats	74	74	30	26
Maximum capacity	200	240	157	100
Doors	4 per side	4 per side	3 per side	2 per side
Wheelchair access	Level boarding	Level boarding	Bridge plates	Bridge plates
Bicycle storage	2 hooks per car	4 hooks per car	—N/a	—N/a

== Sounder commuter rail ==
Sounder is a commuter rail system that runs north–south on two lines from Seattle to Everett and Lakewood, covering 82 miles (132 km). The system uses a fleet of 14 locomotives and 78 bilevel passenger cars, including conventional and cab cars. The Sounder trains are maintained by Amtrak at their Seattle facility under a contract with Sound Transit; the trains are stored overnight in Seattle, at Everett Station, and near Lakewood station. All of the passenger cars are Bombardier BiLevel Coach models manufactured by Bombardier Transportation (now Alstom) in Thunder Bay, Ontario, and assembled in the United States. They comprise 48 conventional coach cars and 30 cab cars that can be used to operate trains from the opposite end of the locomotive. Each passenger car, measuring 85 feet (26 m) long and 15 feet 11 inches (4.85 m) tall, has 130 to 148 upholstered seats arranged in pairs, air conditioning, and one on-board restroom that is designed to be fully accessible. The cars also have a designated space for four wheelchairs, seats with cupholders, and tables with power outlets. Most cars have two spaces for bicycles, while cab cars can carry up to six. The locomotives used on Sounder are 58 feet 7 inches (17.86 m) long and 15 feet 11 inches (4.85 m) tall.

Sounder trains have a maximum speed of 79 miles per hour (127 km/h) and have been fully equipped with satellite-based positive train control since 2018. The first eleven locomotives were manufactured by the Electro-Motive Diesel (EMD) division of General Motors and delivered from 1999 to 2001; they were followed by three MotivePower MP40PH-3C locomotives delivered in 2012 to replace EMD locomotives during rebuilding to meet updated emissions standards. The latest order of passenger cars, manufactured by Alstom, was ordered in 2020 and entered service in 2026.

Several surplus Sounder trainsets have been leased to other U.S. commuter railroads due to delays in expanding service in the Seattle area. Virginia Railway Express leased three locomotives and eighteen bilevel passenger cars from Sound Transit from 2001 to 2008 to supplement other fleet acquisitions. In 2002, a pair of passenger cars were used for a demonstration ride in Minnesota on the corridor of the future Northstar Line before being delivered to Sound Transit. A locomotive and 12 cars were leased in 2004 to Metrolink, a commuter rail system in Southern California, and returned in 2009. Caltrain in the San Francisco Bay Area purchased 5 locomotives and 17 passenger cars in 2001 after Sound Transit delayed the launch of additional round-trips on Sounder.

Active Sounder rolling stock
Type	Model	Image	Year	No.	Qty.
Locomotives	EMD F59PHI	A large locomotive in the Sounder livery with "905" painted on the side	1999–2001	901–911	11
Locomotives	MotivePower MP40PH-3C	A streamlined locomotive in the Sounder livery with "922" painted on the side	2012	921–923	3
Cab cars	Bombardier BiLevel cab car	A double-decker passenger car in the Sounder livery with "111" displayed on two signs at its rear	1999–2001	101–111	11
Cab cars	Bombardier BiLevel cab car	A double-decker passenger car in the Sounder livery with "111" displayed on two signs at its rear	2003	301–307	7
Cab cars	Bombardier BiLevel cab car	A double-decker passenger car in the Sounder livery with a large windshield in the operator's cab	2017	321–329	9
Cab cars	Bombardier BiLevel cab car	A double-decker passenger car in the Sounder livery with a large windshield in the operator's cab	2022	330–332	3
Coaches	Bombardier BiLevel Coach	A double-decker passenger car in the Sounder livery	1999–2003	201–240	30
Coaches	Bombardier BiLevel Coach	A double-decker passenger car in the Sounder livery	2003	401–410	10
Coaches	Bombardier BiLevel Coach	A double-decker passenger car in the Sounder livery	2022	411–418	8

== Sound Transit Express ==
The Sound Transit Express network comprises 24 limited-stop express bus routes that provide regional service to cities in all three counties, primarily using a network of high-occupancy vehicle lanes (HOV lanes) on state-maintained freeways. It uses a fleet of 240 buses that are owned by Sound Transit but operated and maintained under contracts with local transit providers Community Transit, King County Metro, and Pierce Transit. The buses feature uniform Sound Transit branding and include high-back cushioned seating with recline, bicycle racks, and personal reading lights; some also have luggage racks. Most buses in the fleet are low-floor with kneeling and all have accessible seating areas. The buses use diesel or compressed natural gas (CNG) for fuel, along with several hybrid electric buses. They range in size from 40-foot (12 m) conventional buses to 60-foot (18 m) articulated buses and double-decker buses.

The bus system launched in 1999 with a fleet of 114 buses, including several that were leased from its contracted agencies. Among these were 20 dual-mode diesel–electric Breda trolleybuses that were originally acquired by King County Metro for use in the Downtown Seattle Transit Tunnel. They were leased from Metro from 1999 to 2004 on route 550. The first Sound Transit Express contracts were awarded to Gillig and New Flyer in February 1998 for a total of 175 buses, including potential use of non-diesel fuel sources. The first fleet replacements for the system began in 2011. Sound Transit debuted its first double-decker Alexander Dennis Enviro500 MMC buses in November 2015 and assigned them to routes serving Snohomish County. The smallest buses in the Sound Transit Express fleet can carry 37 seated passengers, while the largest double-deckers have 82 seats and room for up to 100 passengers.

Sound Transit Express bus fleet specifications
Manufacturer	Model	Image	Year	No.	Qty.	Length	Capacity	Fuel type	Operator
Alexander Dennis	Enviro500 MMC		2015	91501–91505	5	42 ft (13 m)	82 seats	Diesel	Community Transit
Alexander Dennis	Enviro500 MMC		2017	91701–91732	32	42 ft (13 m)	82 seats	Diesel	Community Transit
Alexander Dennis	Enviro500 MMC		2019–2020	91901–91913	13	42 ft (13 m)	82 seats	Diesel	Community Transit
Gillig	Low Floor BRT		2012	9201–9222 (Note: Some units have been retired, while others remain in service. The numbers reflect the entire fleet at the time of delivery.)	22	40 ft (12 m)	35 seats	Diesel–electric	Pierce Transit
Gillig	Low Floor BRT		2012	9122–9123	2	40 ft (12 m)	35 seats	Diesel	Pierce Transit
Gillig	Low Floor BRT		2015	9124–9126	3	40 ft (12 m)	35 seats	Diesel	Pierce Transit
Gillig	Low Floor BRT Plus		2015	41501–41517	16	40 ft (12 m)	35 seats	CNG	Pierce Transit
Gillig	Low Floor BRT Plus		2016	41601–41605	5	40 ft (12 m)	35 seats	CNG	Pierce Transit
Gillig	Phantom		2008	9092–9113	22	40 ft (12 m)	42 seats	Diesel	Pierce Transit
Motor Coach Industries	D4500		2008	9713–9719	7	45 ft (14 m)	57 seats	Diesel	Pierce Transit
Motor Coach Industries	D4500		2009	9720–9722	3	45 ft (14 m)	57 seats	Diesel	Pierce Transit
Motor Coach Industries	D4500		2010	9723–9739	15	45 ft (14 m)	57 seats	Diesel	Pierce Transit
Motor Coach Industries	D4500		2017	9301–9312	12	45 ft (14 m)	57 seats	CNG	Pierce Transit
New Flyer	DE60LF		2010	9624–9636	13	60 ft (18 m)	56 seats	Diesel–electric	King County Metro
New Flyer	D60LFR		2010	9553–9565	13	60 ft (18 m)	58 seats	Diesel	Community Transit
New Flyer	D60LFR		2011	9566–9596	31	60 ft (18 m)	58 seats	Diesel	King County Metro
New Flyer	D60LFR		2012	9800–9813	14	60 ft (18 m)	58 seats	Diesel	King County Metro
New Flyer	D60LFR		2012	9818–9822	5	60 ft (18 m)	58 seats	Diesel	King County Metro
New Flyer	DE60LFR		2010	9637–9647	11	60 ft (18 m)	56 seats	Diesel–electric	King County Metro
New Flyer	DE60LFR		2011	9648–9651	4	60 ft (18 m)	56 seats	Diesel–electric	King County Metro
New Flyer	XD60		2014	9814–9817	4	60 ft (18 m)	57 seats	Diesel	King County Metro
New Flyer	XD60		2014	51401–51403	3	60 ft (18 m)	57 seats	Diesel	Pierce Transit
New Flyer	XDE60		2015	9652–9659	7	60 ft (18 m)	57 seats	Diesel–electric	King County Metro
New Flyer	XDE60		2015	61401–61407	7	60 ft (18 m)	57 seats	Diesel–electric	Pierce Transit
New Flyer	XDE60		2020	9660–9690	31	60 ft (18 m)	57 seats	Diesel–electric	King County Metro

=== Retired fleet ===
Sound Transit Express retired bus fleet specifications
Manufacturer	Model	Image	Year	Fleet numbers	Qty.	Length	Capacity	Fuel type	Operator
Breda	DuoBus ADPB 350	—N/a	1999 (Note: Leased from King County Metro; originally entered service in 1990.)	—	20	60 ft (18 m)	63 seats	Diesel–electric (overhead wire)	King County Metro
Gillig	Low Floor BRT		2012	9201–9222	22	40 ft (12 m)	35 seats	Diesel–electric	Pierce Transit
Gillig	Phantom		1999	9000–9069	70	40 ft (12 m)	42 seats	Diesel	All
Gillig	Phantom		2001	9070–9089	20	40 ft (12 m)	42 seats	Diesel	King County Metro
Gillig	Phantom		2005	9090–9091	2	40 ft (12 m)	42 seats	Diesel	King County Metro
Gillig	Phantom		2008	9092–9113	22	40 ft (12 m)	42 seats	Diesel	Pierce Transit
Gillig	Phantom		2008	9114–9121	8	40 ft (12 m)	42 seats	Diesel	Community Transit
Motor Coach Industries	D4500		2005	9700–9712	13	45 ft (14 m)	57 seats	Diesel	Pierce Transit
New Flyer	C40LF		2001	9400–9419	20	40 ft (12 m)	37 seats	CNG	Pierce Transit
New Flyer	D60LF		1999–2004	9500–9552	53	60 ft (18 m)	58 seats	Diesel	All
New Flyer	DE40LF		2003	9200	1	40 ft (12 m)	37 seats	Diesel–electric	King County Metro
New Flyer	DE60LF		2004	9600–9621	22	60 ft (18 m)	58 seats	Diesel–electric	King County Metro
New Flyer	DE60LF		2010	9624–9636	13	60 ft (18 m)	56 seats	Diesel–electric	King County Metro
New Flyer	D60LFR		2010	9553–9565	13	60 ft (18 m)	58 seats	Diesel	Community Transit
New Flyer	D60LFR		2011	9566–9596	31	60 ft (18 m)	58 seats	Diesel	King County Metro
New Flyer	D60LFR		2012	9800–9813	14	60 ft (18 m)	58 seats	Diesel	King County Metro
New Flyer	DE60LFR		2010	9637–9647	11	60 ft (18 m)	56 seats	Diesel–electric	King County Metro
Orion	Orion V		1999 (Note: Manufactured in 1994 for Pierce Transit and sold to Sound Transit.)	801–827	27	40 ft (12 m)	42 seats	CNG	Pierce Transit

== Stride bus rapid transit ==
Stride is a planned bus rapid transit (BRT) system managed by Sound Transit with three lines scheduled to enter service between 2028 and 2029. The system will span 48 miles (77 km) and serve 25 stations, primarily on Interstate 405 and State Route 522. The entire Stride fleet is planned to be battery electric buses that are able to support wireless inductive charging. The buses will have priority seating for passengers with disabilities, accessible boarding ramps, and rider information screens. In August 2023, Sound Transit awarded contracts to Alexander Dennis and BYD for the 46 buses that will comprise the Stride fleet. Alexander Dennis will manufacture 32 Enviro500EV electric double-decker buses for Stride's two freeway routes at a cost of $73.2 million. BYD will manufacture 14 RIDE K11M articulated buses for use on the S3 Line, which has more frequent stops, at a cost of $33.5 million.

Stride bus fleet specifications
Manufacturer	Model	Year	Fleet numbers	Qty.	Length	Capacity	Fuel type	Ref.
Alexander Dennis	Enviro500EV	2027	TBA	32	45 ft (14 m)	TBA	Electric battery	
BYD	BYD RIDE K11M	2027	TBA	14	60 ft (18 m)	TBA	Electric battery	
