= Du Pen Fountain =

Fountain and sculpture in Olympia, Washington, U.S.

Coordinates: 47.03453°N 122.90485°W

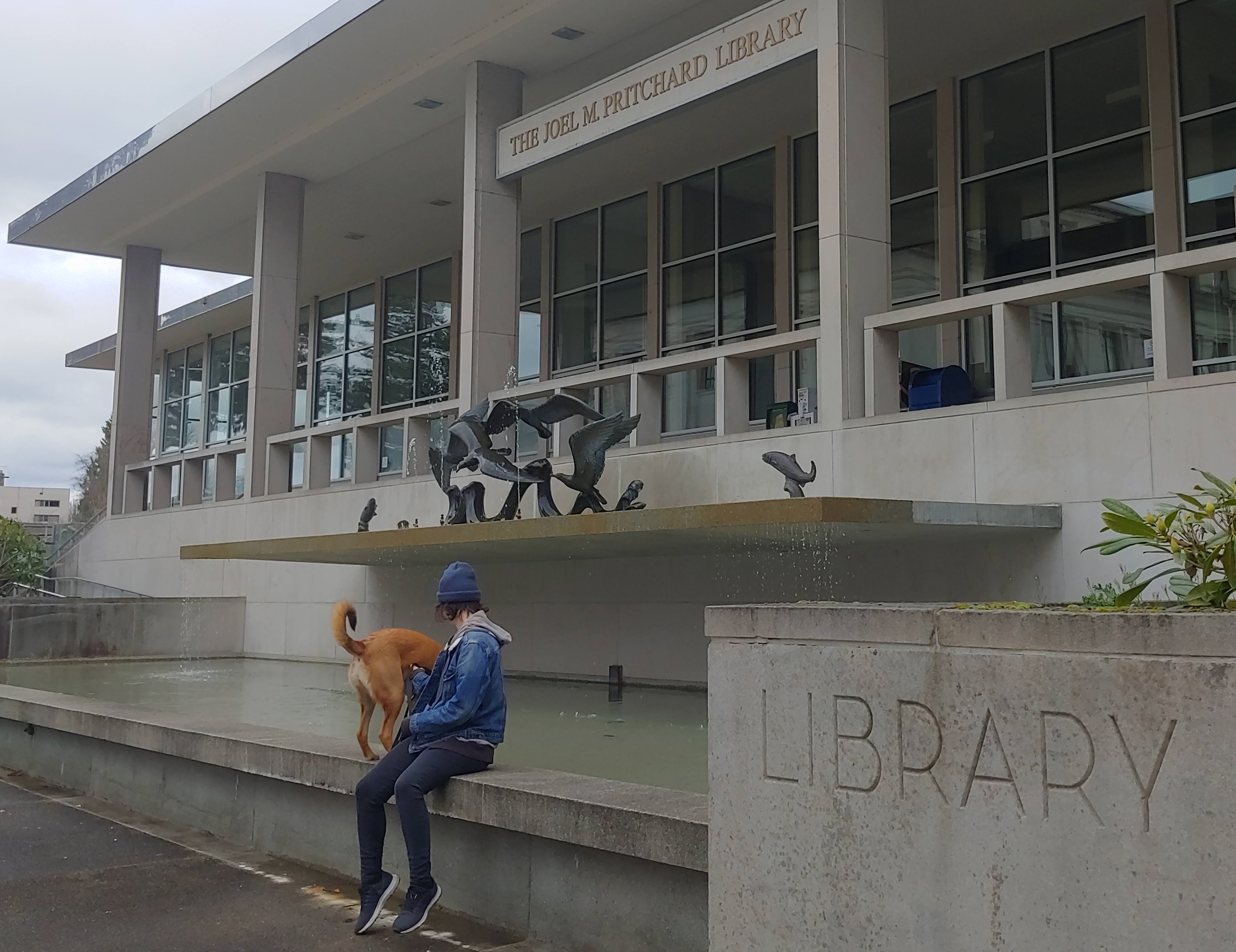
- Fountain in 2020
- Artist: Everett Du Pen
- Year: c. 1955
- Medium: Copper-enriched bronze; green terrazzo; cement
- Location: Pritchard Building, Washington State Capitol campus Olympia, Washington, U.S.
- Owner: State of Washington

The Du Pen Fountain is a water fountain at the former Washington State Library building on the Washington State Capitol campus in Olympia, Washington, in the United States. The sculptor, Everett Du Pen (1912–2005), was well known in the Northwest, and chairman of the Sculpture Department at the University of Washington when he was commissioned for the piece in 1955. The fountain is made of 900 pounds (410 kg) of copper-enriched bronze, green terrazzo, and cement. An element of the fountain is a pair of salmon spitting water. The fountain, along with the nearby and much larger Tivoli Fountain replica, is shut down by the state property administration agency during summer droughts. The artist also created the Fountain of Creation at the Seattle Center for the 1962 World's Fair. The Seattle fountain is also nicknamed Du Pen (or DuPen) Fountain.
