= Gun laws in Washington (state) =

Constitution
- Constitution sections: Article I, Section 24
- Synopsis "The right of the individual citizen to bear arms in defense of himself, or the state, shall not be impaired ..."

Gun laws in Washington regulate the sale, possession, and use of firearms and ammunition in the state of Washington in the United States.

The Constitution of Washington protects an individual's right to bear arms. Washington preempts localities from regulating firearms in any manner more restrictive than State law except as explicitly authorized by the State legislature. Authorized local firearm regulations include:

- "Restricting the discharge of firearms in any portion of their respective jurisdictions where there is a reasonable likelihood that humans, domestic animals, or property will be jeopardized. Such laws and ordinances shall not abridge the right of the individual guaranteed by Article I, section 24 of the state Constitution to bear arms in defense of self or others."
- "Restricting the possession of firearms in any stadium or convention center, operated by a city, town, county, except that such restrictions shall not apply to concealed pistol license holders, law enforcement officers, or any showing, demonstration, or lecture involving the exhibition of firearms."
- "Restricting the areas in their respective jurisdictions in which firearms may be sold."

There are some age restrictions on the possession of firearms and some people are prohibited from possessing firearms due to certain criminal convictions or who are released on bond or their own recognizance pending trial for certain criminal charges. Since July 1, 1994, machine guns, short-barreled shotguns, and any parts thereof are prohibited. Silencers and short-barreled rifles may be possessed and used in accordance with federal law. Pistols transferred through an Federal firearms licensed dealer must be registered with Washington State D.O.L.

There are places where the possession or storage of firearms or ammunition is prohibited or otherwise restricted. Statutory law prohibits firearms in places such as areas of buildings used for court proceedings, certain areas of public mental health facilities, establishments which serve alcohol and are off-limits to persons under 21 years of age, restricted-access areas of commercial airports, State correctional facilities, and outdoor music festivals. Administrative law prohibits or otherwise restricts the possession or storage of firearms in places such as certain schools, premises of the Office of Administrative Hearings, child care centers, horse races, near certain explosive materials, and certain shelters for respite or youths. See the Washington 'infobox' or one of this section's referenced documents for the complete list as well as where exceptions apply for those who hold concealed pistol licenses.

As a general rule, a person may legally open carry without a permit in Washington state in any place it is legal to possess a loaded handgun, as long as it does not manifest "an intent to intimidate another or [warrant] alarm for the safety of other persons." A properly holstered visible handgun will not generally fall under that clause. To open-carry a loaded handgun in a vehicle (e.g, car, bus, etc ...) a person must have a valid concealed pistol license. The county sheriff or city police chief shall issue a concealed pistol license to any applicant, age 21 or older, who meets certain requirements, including no felony convictions, no misdemeanor domestic violence convictions, and no outstanding warrants.

In Washington, the police may temporarily seize guns from people a judge deems a threat to themselves or others. Law enforcement personnel may alert mental health professionals, who can determine if someone is a threat or needs involuntary treatment. The police must notify any family or household members who want to know about a gun being returned to the person from whom it was taken away.

Several new gun control provisions were enacted when I-1639 was approved by the voters in November 2018. These include increased background checks, firearm safety training, a waiting period and a 21 years old age minimum before buying semi-automatic rifles, new age limitations on who may purchase or possess certain firearms, including prohibiting some firearm purchases by persons under age 21, and require certain secured firearm storage or trigger-locks, and criminalizing certain firearm storage if it results in unauthorized use. Some local counties have adopted Second Amendment sanctuary resolutions in opposition.

On April 25, 2023, new gun restrictions were passed, including a ban on the sale, distribution, importation, and manufacturing of certain semi-automatic firearms classified as assault weapons. Possession of assault weapons already owned by state residents remains legal. The state also implemented a ten-day waiting period and a training requirement for firearm purchases. Additionally, a new law allows residents to sue gun manufacturers for irresponsible conduct.

== Concealed weapon reciprocity ==
Washington concealed pistol licenses will be recognized in the following states, and concealed weapons licenses issued in the listed states will be recognized in Washington State, so long as the handgun is carried in accordance with Washington law: Idaho (Idaho Enhanced Permit only), Kansas, Louisiana, Michigan (non-resident concealed pistol licenses issued by Washington state are not recognized by Michigan), North Carolina, North Dakota (Class 1 North Dakota permits only), Ohio, Oklahoma, South Dakota (South Dakota Enhanced Permit only. Restricted 18 to 20 year old Enhanced Permit is not recognized by Washington) and Utah.

Washington state law also carves exemptions into state law regarding Concealed Pistol Licenses. RCW 9.41.060, section 8: "Any person engaging in a lawful outdoor recreational activity such as hunting, fishing, camping, hiking, or horseback riding, only if, considering all of the attendant circumstances, including but not limited to whether the person has a valid hunting or fishing license, it is reasonable to conclude that the person is participating in lawful outdoor activities or is traveling to or from a legitimate outdoor recreation area."

Washington is a "stand your ground" state, in which there is no duty to retreat in the face of what would be perceived by an ordinary person to be a threat to themselves or others by another person that is likely to cause serious injury or death. It is a gross misdemeanor to aim a firearm "whether loaded or not, at or towards any human being". Unless the person is acting in self-defense, they can be charged with "brandishing" and threatening someone with a deadly weapon.

== Summary table ==
Subject / law	Long guns	Handguns	Revised Code of Washington	Notes
State permit required to purchase?	Partial	Yes		Must be 21 to purchase a pistol or semiautomatic rifle. Since July 2019, the purchaser of a semiautomatic rifle must provide proof of completing a recognized firearm safety training program in the last five years.
Firearm registration?	Partial	Partial		Retail dealers must record and report all retail pistol sales to local police/sheriff and to state department of licensing, and must record and report all semiautomatic rifle sales after July 1, 2019.
Owner license required?	No	No		
Constitutional Right to Bear Arms?	Yes	Yes		
Permit required for concealed carry?	N/A	Yes		Washington is a "shall-issue" state and will grant concealed carry permits to all applicants who meet the criteria. There are no training requirements.
Permit required for open carry?	No	No	(in vehicle)	Open carry is lawful in Washington without any permit. Open carry of a loaded handgun in a vehicle is legal only with a concealed pistol license. Open carry of a loaded long gun in a vehicle is illegal, regardless of CPL possession. On January 31, 2019, the Washington Court of Appeals ruled that the mere possession of a handgun is not sufficient for conducting a Terry stop.
State preemption of local restrictions?	Yes	Yes		State law does not allow more restrictive local laws. Seattle and Edmonds have passed ordinances mandating safe storage of firearms when not being carried or used. Seattle's ordinance also has reporting requirement for lost or stolen firearms within 24 hours. Both cities are being sued for violation of state preemption. Edmonds had its ordinance struck down in October 2019.
Assault weapons law?	Yes	Yes		As of April 25, 2023, the sale, distribution, importation, and manufacturing of semi-automatic firearms classified as assault weapons are prohibited. Possession of assault weapons already owned remains legal.
Magazine capacity restrictions?	Yes	Yes		As of July 1, 2022, the manufacture, distribution, and sale of magazines that have a capacity of over 10 rounds are prohibited. The possession of such magazines, however, is not restricted.
NFA weapons restricted?	Partial	Partial		Machine guns and short-barreled shotguns—unless purchased before July 1, 1994—are illegal for non-law-enforcement possession. Suppressors, destructive devices and any other weapons are lawful to possess and use if registered properly with ATF. Short barreled rifles are lawful to possess and use if registered properly with the ATF, as of June 12, 2014.
Peaceable Journey laws?	No	No		Federal travel-with-a-firearm laws apply. Some out-of-state CCW licenses valid, otherwise carry must be open or, in a vehicle, unloaded.
Castle Doctrine / Stand your ground law?	Not defined - de facto			The Washington State Supreme Court ruled "that there is no duty to retreat when a person is assaulted in a place where he or she has a right to be."
Background checks required for private sales?	Yes	Yes	Initiative 594 (2014)	Private party firearm transfers must be conducted through a licensed dealer, who is required by federal law to conduct a background check and keep a record of the sale, unless one of the specifically enumerated exceptions in RCW 9.41.113.
Red flag law?	Yes	Yes		The police may temporarily take guns away from people a judge deems a threat to themselves or others without notice to the defendant. If the defendant does not appear to request the restrictions be lifted, they will remain in place.

== See also ==
- Law of Washington (state)
