= Code Reviser =

Code Reviser of Washington
- Incumbent; Kathleen Buchli since 2018
- Term length: indefinite
- Formation: Revised Code of Washington

The Code Reviser is a State of Washington government official responsible for harmonizing the laws of the state and advising legislators on the preparation of bills.

== History ==
=== Establishment ===
In the first half-century of statehood, there was no official compilation of the laws of the state. Two private publishers independently compiled and published statutes enacted by the Washington state legislature into bound volumes: Remington Revised Statutes and Pierce's Perpetual Code. In 1951 the legislature enacted a common numbering system for the state's laws and published an official codex known as the Revised Code of Washington (RCW). The publication of the RCW was accompanied by the creation of the office of Code Reviser.

=== List of Code Revisers ===
Name	Term	Birthplace	Alma mater
Richard White	1951-1978	California	Hastings College of Law
Dennis Cooper	1979-2005		
K. Kyle Thiessen	2006–2018		
Kathleen Buchli	2018-Present		

== Duties and office ==
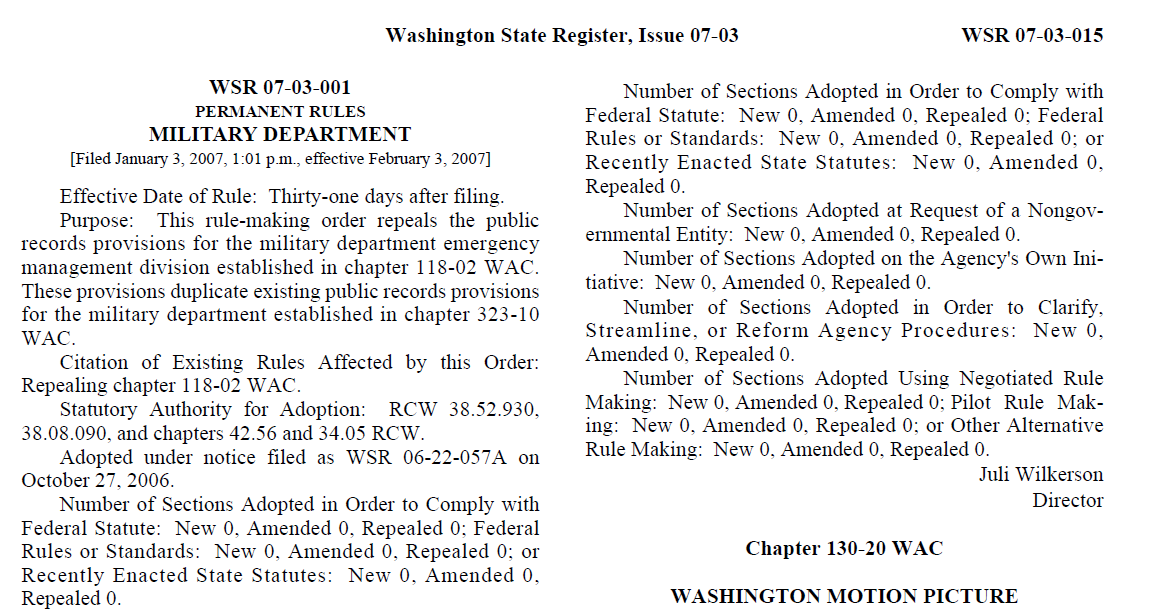
The Code Reviser appoints the editor of the "Washington State Register," the government gazette.

The office of the Code Reviser is established in the Revised Code of Washington. They are appointed by the Statute Law Committee, which consists of four members of the legislature (two from each of the two largest political parties), an attorney appointed by the Washington State Bar, an attorney appointed by the Governor of Washington, a justice of the Washington Supreme Court (or an attorney appointed by the Chief Justice), and four professional staff members employed by the legislature. By law, the Code Reviser must be a lawyer; however, the functions of the office can also be delegated by the Statute Law Committee to a private legal publisher.

The Code Reviser is authorized to make minor style revisions to the laws of Washington as they are enacted by the legislature (for example, changing the words "effective date of this act" to an actual calendar date), correct obvious errors in laws enacted by the legislature such as incorrect citations and references, number and publish the Revised Code of Washington, and provide bill drafting advice to members of the legislature. The Code Reviser also appoints the editor of the Washington State Register, the state's government gazette.

The Code Reviser employs a professional staff of approximately 40 persons who operate in the Joel M. Pritchard Building in Olympia, Washington. As of 2003 the Code Reviser was paid an annual salary of $104,400; by 2011 this had increased to $120,106.

== See also ==
- Law of Washington (state)
