= Joel M. Pritchard Building =

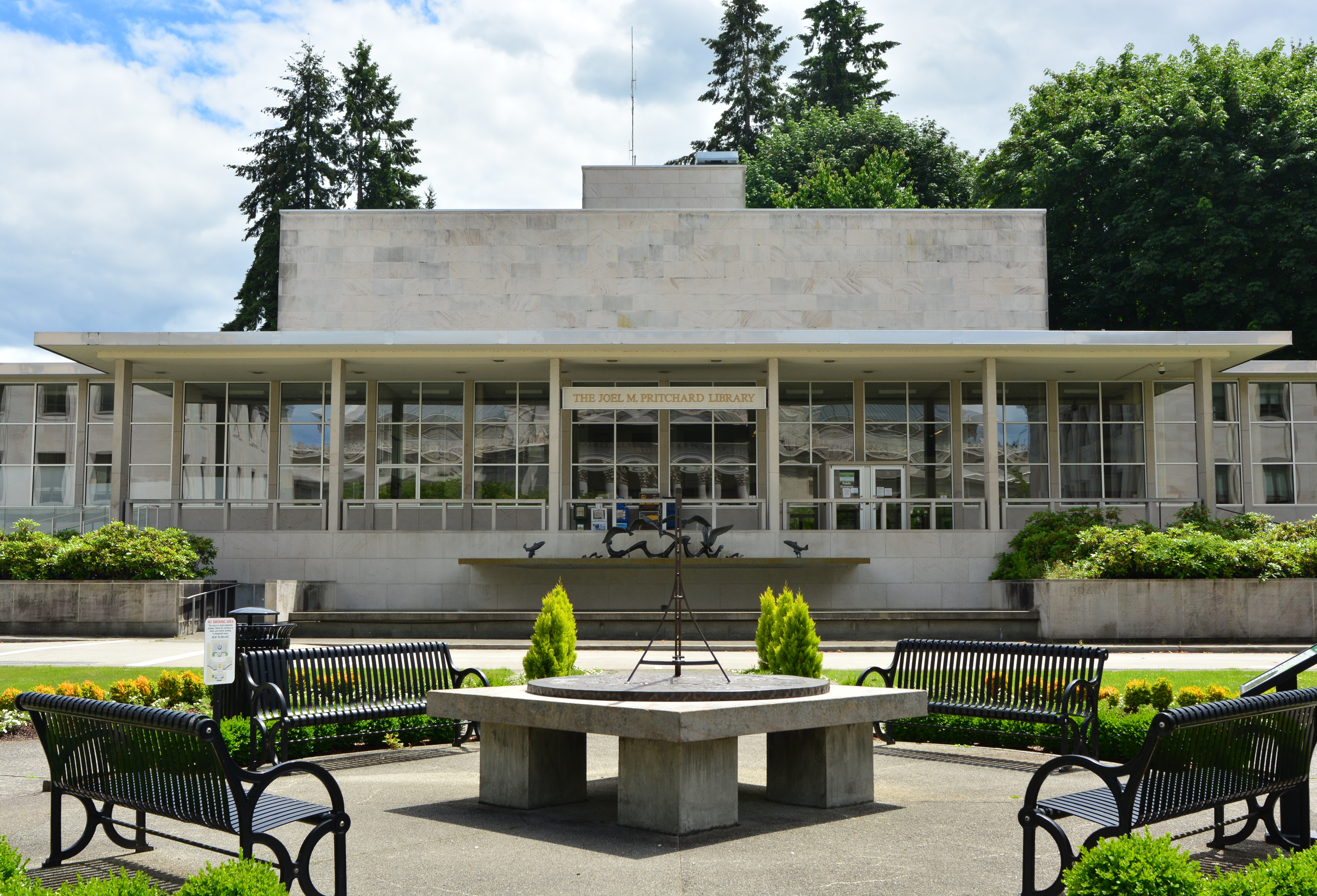
- Joel M. Pritchard Building, 2020
- Interactive map of the Joel M. Pritchard Building area
- Former names: Washington State Library building, Joel M. Pritchard Library

General information
- Type: Library, later office building
- Architectural style: Modern or New Formal
- Location: Olympia, Washington, United States
- Coordinates: 47.0345°N 122.9049°W
- Elevation: 120 ft (37 m)
- Current tenants: State administrative offices
- Construction started: November 5, 1957
- Inaugurated: November 15, 1958
- Cost: $2.45 million (authorized)
- Client: Washington State Library
- Owner: State of Washington

Design and construction
- Architect: Paul Thiry
- Awards and prizes: AIA/ALA Library Building Award

The Joel M. Pritchard Building at the Washington State Capitol campus in Olympia was built in 1957–1958 to house the Washington State Library, which had outgrown its previous location in the basement of the Washington Supreme Court's Temple of Justice. The building's architect, Paul Thiry who also designed the Century 21 Exposition complex in Seattle, used Modern design incorporating the Wilkeson sandstone quarried a few tens of miles away and used in the state capitol and other buildings. It was the last monumental building added to the capitol campus and one of the few departures from the Olmsted Brothers' 1928 campus plan. It was described as "among the most important regional archetypes of mid-century architectural design and thought...a textbook on how Washingtonians looked at the future in the 1950s". It was named for Joel M. Pritchard, a U.S. Congressman from Washington and the state's Lieutenant Governor. Thiry won the American Institute of Architects/American Library Association Library Building Award for the design, the first such award to be presented. The building was listed on the National Register of Historic Places in 2015.

After the 2001 Nisqually Earthquake, the damaged state capitol building was evacuated, and the library collection and staff were moved out; Pritchard building's main floor became the chamber of the Washington State Senate, and parts were used for other activities. As of the 2010s it was occupied by the Code Reviser and other administrative staff.

== Public art ==
Up to 2.5 percent of the building's construction cost was reserved for public art. The pieces placed at the library immediately after construction included Du Pen Fountain, a sundial by John W. Elliott, a mosaic by James FitzGerald, photographs by Bob and Ira Spring, and murals by Kenneth Callahan and Mark Tobey. It was Tobey's only work on public display in Olympia, while Tobey, a member of the Northwest School "big four", was considered the West Coast's most famous living painter. (Note: The Los Angeles Times 1958 review, cited in Iridescent Light: The Emergence of Northwest Art, p. 39, (chapter reprinted at Historylink) noting the library commission immediately followed.) Washington sculptor and painter George Tsutakawa was in charge of placing the art. The Tobey was moved to Tacoma Art Museum in 2003, but returned to the Pritchard Building in 2008.
