= Washington State Library =

State library of Washington, U.S.

- 46°59′10″N 122°54′24″W
- Location: Tumwater, Washington, US
- Type: State library
- Established: 1853

Collection
- Size: 2.25 million items

Other information
- Director: Sara Jones
- Website: sos.wa.gov/library

The Washington State Library is a government agency that operates public libraries in Washington state's prisons and mental hospitals, and maintains collections related to the state government. Based in Tumwater, it is a service of the Washington Secretary of State and was founded in 1853 as the Washington Territorial Library. The library has a collection of 2.25 million physical items and other online resources available to residents of the state.

== History ==
The Washington Territorial Library was established on March 2, 1853, with the signing of the Organic Act by President Millard Fillmore to create Washington Territory. The law included an appropriation of $5,000 for the territory library that was used by appointed Territorial Governor Issac Stevens to buy and ship 2,130 volumes from New York City to Olympia. The first shipment of books departed from New York City on May 21, 1853, aboard the Invincible, which traveled around Cape Horn and South America to San Francisco. The books were transferred to the Tarquinia and arrived in Olympia on October 23, 1853, a few weeks before Governor Stevens arrived from his overland trip and took office. The library was opened to public use beginning in 1855, after an amendment to the territorial library law was passed by the territorial legislature.

Prior to achieving statehood on November 11, 1889, the Territorial Library reported a collection of 10,448 volumes. The new state legislature passed a bill creating the state library on March 27, 1890. The state library's collection was organized under the Dewey Decimal Classification system in 1898, and a card index was created in 1901. The library occupied the Joel M. Pritchard Building on the State Capitol campus in Olympia from 1958 until it was damaged by the 2001 Nisqually earthquake and evacuated. At its greatest extent in the 1990s, the library contained 547,000 books, periodicals, and documents.

The library was moved to a temporary location in Tumwater in December 2001, while the Pritchard Building underwent already-planned renovations and served as the temporary chambers for the state senate. The general collection was downsized by 260,000 books, which were donated to local libraries. The state government proposed closing the state library as part of its 2002 budget, saving $9 million in annual expenses, but the library was saved by eliminating the state library commission and merging operations with the Office of the Secretary of State effective July 1, 2002. The state government attempted to eliminate the state library a second time in December 2002, with collections transferred to local universities and colleges, but was saved by downsizing its staff and reorganizing under the Office of the Secretary of State. The library has since expanded its digital collections, which include scanned copies of older state newspapers and books.

In 2019, the state legislature approved a $2 fee on recorded documents to fund the construction of a new library and archives building in Tumwater. The $108 million project would construct a joint facility on the South Campus near the former state library. The Washington State Archives are currently housed in a building on the capitol campus that was constructed in 1962 and deemed too small to hold the state's records.

The state library and Washington Talking Book and Braille Library were both closed to the public on July 1, 2025, as part of the state government's funding cuts.

== Branches and services ==
The State Library maintains branches at several state agencies, as well as in correctional facilities and mental hospitals:

- Washington State Department of Transportation Library
- Washington State Department of Natural Resources Library
- Washington State Utilities and Transportation Committee Library
- Washington State Department of Labor and Industries Library
- WSDOT Materials Laboratory Library
- Washington Talking Book & Braille Library, Seattle (since 2008)
- Eastern State Hospital Library
- Western State Hospital Library
- Airway Heights Corrections Center Library
- Clallam Bay Corrections Center Library
- Coyote Ridge Corrections Center Library
- Stafford Creek Corrections Center Library
- Twin Rivers Corrections Center Library
- Washington Corrections Center Library
- Washington Corrections Center for Women Library
- Washington State Penitentiary Library
- Washington State Reformatory Library

=== Services ===
The Washington State Library coordinates library access to the Washington K-20 Network (computer network). The library also operates the Washington Digital Newspapers program, begun in 2015.

== List of librarians ==
- Bion Freeman Kendall, 1853–1857
- Henry R. Crosbie, 1857
- Urban East Hicks, 1858
- Andrew Jackson Moses, 1859
- James Clark Head, 1860–1861, 1863, 1865
- Thomas Taylor, 1862
- John Paul Judson, 1864
- Samuel Nelson Woodruff, 1866
- Henry Lensen Chapman, 1866
- Levi Shelton, 1867–1869
- Jeremiah D. Mabie, 1869–1870
- Sylvester Hill Mann, 1870
- Champion Bramwell Mann, 1870
- Issac Van Dorsey Mossman, 1870–1873
- Benjamin Franklin Yantis, 1873–1875
- Frederick S. Holmes, 1875–1877
- Elwood Evans, 1877–1879
- Walter W. Newlin, 1879–1880
- James Peyre Ferry, 1880–1881
- Eliza Des Saure Newell, 1882–1887
- Eleanor Sharp Stevenson, 1888–1890
- Gretchen Knief Schenk, 1942-1945
- Carma Zimmerman, 1945–1951
- Marayan Reynolds, 1951-1975
- Roderick Gardner Schwartz, 1975-1986
- Nancy Zussy, 1986-2002
- Jan Walsh, 2002-2010
- Randall Simmons, 2010-2015
- Cindy Altick Aden, 2016-2020
- Sara Jones, 2021–present day

== See also ==
- List of libraries in the United States
