= Gretchen Knief Schenk =

American librarian (1901–1989)

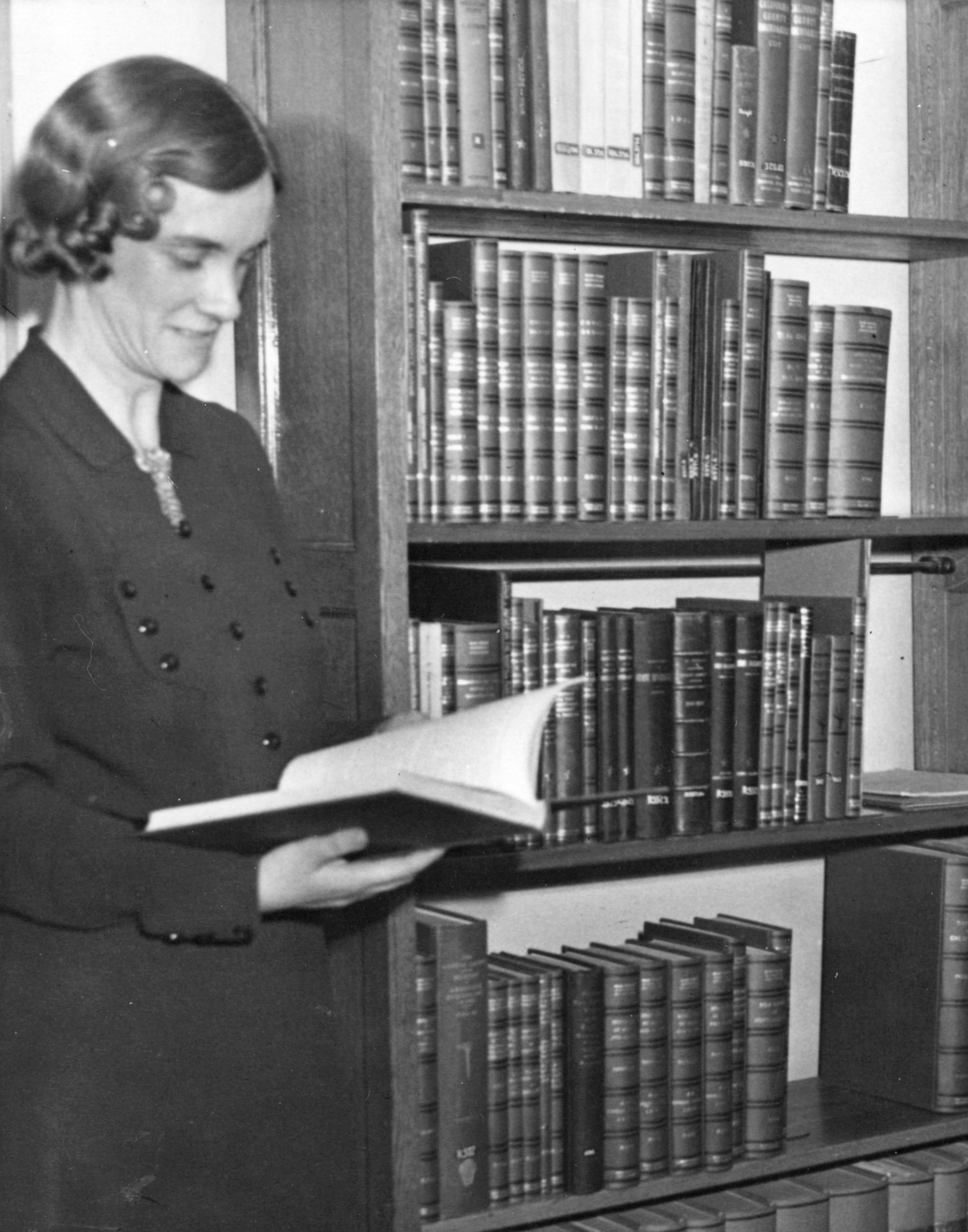
- Gretchen Knief, reading a book
- Born: October 1, 1901; Milwaukee, Wisconsin, U.S.
- Died: May 16, 1989 (aged 87); Foley, Alabama, U.S.
- Occupations: librarian, library systems consultant
- Known for: Kern County Librarian (1930s); Washington State Librarian (1942–1945); president of the Alabama Library Association (1949–1950); California Library Hall of Fame (2013)

Gretchen Knief Schenk (October 1, 1901 – May 16, 1989) was an American librarian, who served as Washington State Librarian from 1942 to 1945, and as president of the Alabama Library Association from 1949 to 1950. She was inducted into the California Library Hall of Fame in 2013.

== Early life ==
Gretchen D. Knief was born in Milwaukee, Wisconsin, the daughter of Frederick Constantine Knief and Dora Mueller Knief. Her father was a Lutheran minister, who moved the family to southern California in 1923. She attended Milwaukee State Normal School, the University of California, Los Angeles, and the University of Illinois Library School.

== Career ==
Knief's early library jobs included work at the Milwaukee Public Library, the Los Angeles Public Library, the Santa Monica Public Library, and the Siskiyou County Free Library in Yreka, California.

In 1939, Knief was the county librarian of Kern County, California, when the county Board of Supervisors ordered that the libraries remove all copies of John Steinbeck's The Grapes of Wrath. She announced that, once removed, the books would not be discarded, but instead offered to other county libraries in California. The book was restored to Kern County library shelves in January 1941. "Banning books is so utterly hopeless and futile," she wrote in a letter to the Board. "Ideas don't die because a book is forbidden reading. If Steinbeck has written the truth, that truth will survive." In 1941 she announced the availability of another controversial title, Jan Valtin's Out of the Night, a bestselling autobiography said to contain "lurid tales of violence and horror" by an ex-spy.

Schenk moved to Washington soon after the Steinbeck controversy, and was Washington State Librarian from 1942 to 1945. After World War II, she became a library consultant based in Summerdale, Alabama, conducting studies of county and statewide public library systems, and making recommendations for improvement. She was president of the Alabama Library Association from 1949 to 1950, and led the association's first, contentious discussions about admitting black librarians into its membership. The American Library Association published Schenk's County and Regional Library Development in 1954.

Schenk was presented with the second Beta Phi Mu Award in 1955, for "distinguished service to librarianship". She was posthumously inducted into the California Library Hall of Fame in 2013.

== Personal life ==
Gretchen Knief married German-born dairy farmer Franz Schenk in 1942. She died in Foley, Alabama, in 1989, aged 87 years, the same year as the fiftieth anniversary of The Grapes of Wrath's publication, and of her efforts to keep the book on California library shelves.
