= Temple of Justice (Washington) =

Government building in Olympia, Washington, United States

- Temple of Justice in 2026

General information
- Architectural style: American Neoclassicism
- Location: Olympia, Washington, United States
- Coordinates: 47°2′13.06″N 122°54′17.41″W
- Construction started: 1912
- Completed: 1920

Design and construction
- Architects: Walter R. Wilder and Harry K. White

Website
- capitol.wa.gov/temple-justice

The Temple of Justice is a government building in Olympia, Washington, where sessions of the Washington Supreme Court are convened. It also houses the state's official law library, and formerly housed the office of the attorney general of Washington.

== History ==
The Temple of Justice, along with other government buildings on the Washington State Capitol campus, was designed by the New York architectural team of Walter Wilder and Harry White. Ground was broken in the spring of 1912 by Washington Supreme Court chief justice R. O. Dunbar and the facility completed by 1920. Even during the period of construction, however, the Temple of Justice was used by the state. In January 1913, the inaugural ball of Governor Ernest Lister was held at the Temple of Justice, and the Supreme Court began meeting regularly in the unfinished building the same year.

In his book Washington's Audacious State Capitol and Its Builders, architectural historian Norman Johnston, whose father, Jay Johnston, was the resident supervisor during the construction, offered a detailed description of the plans for the Temple of Justice:

Matching the longitudinal dimensions of the [central] Legislative Building, toward which its main entrance faced in the group plan, the Temple of Justice was shown as a long rectangular building with shallow extended wings at either end. Its proportions were horizontal, with an almost uninterrupted skyline and subdued ornamentation that would dampen any competition with the authority of the Legislative Building. The only challenges to this restraint were the use of the Corinthian order along the full length of both the north and south elevations and some sculptural emphasis at the main entrance. The interior plan mirrored the exterior symmetry with almost total balance of spaces on either side of the transverse axis.

From 1987 to 1989 the Temple of Justice was closed to allow for seismic retrofitting. Minor cosmetic damage resulting from the 2001 Nisqually earthquake resulted in another closure for repairs.

Like the capitol building, the Temple of Justice is constructed from Wilkeson stone, a durable sandstone mined from quarries in Wilkeson, Pierce County, Washington, and was completed at a cost of $942,230 (equivalent to $15.14 million in 2025)

== Interior ==
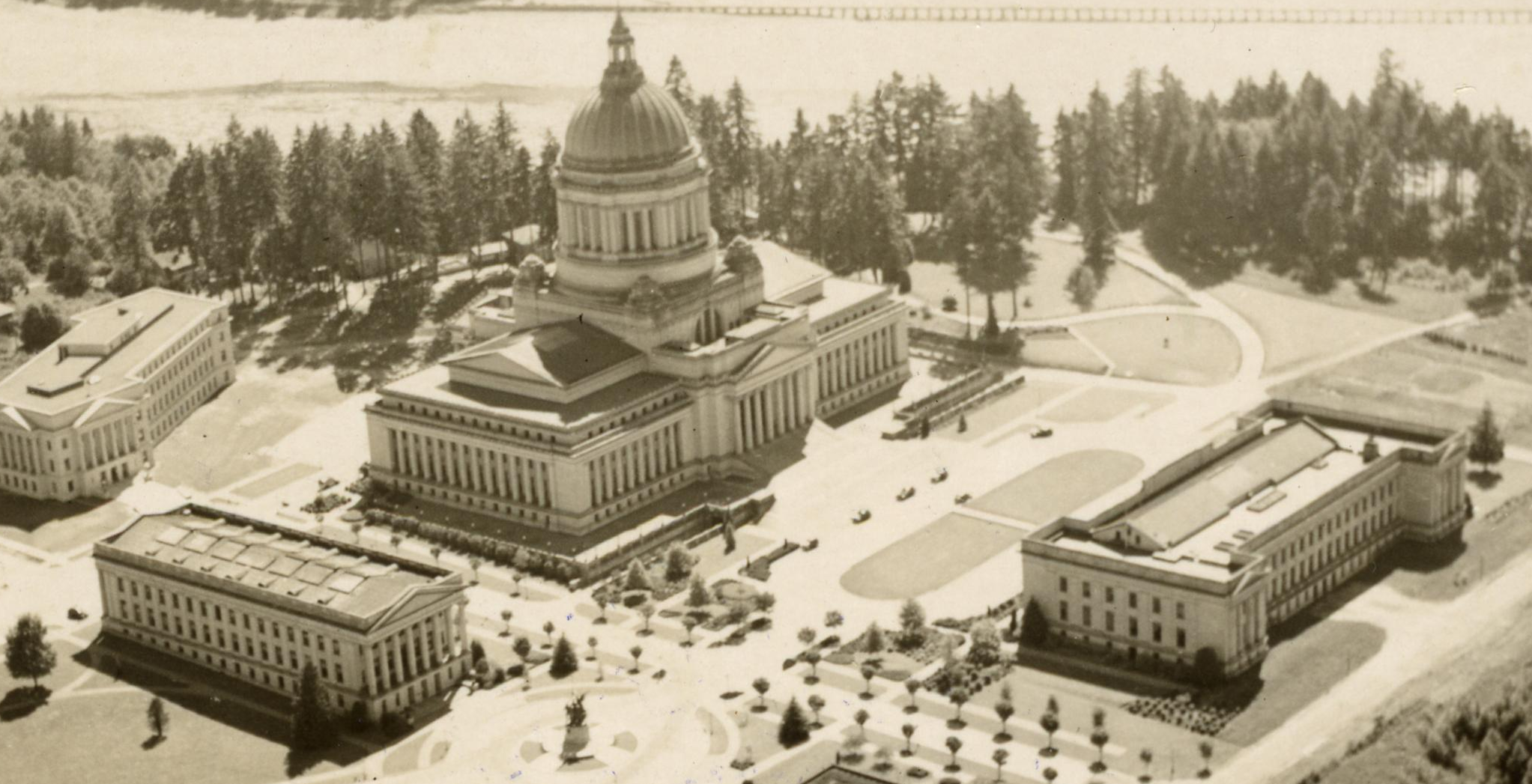
Bird's eye view of the Washington capital campus; the Temple of Justice is seen on the right side of the photo, 1938

=== Courtroom ===
At the time of the construction of the Temple of Justice, the Supreme Court heard all appeals from the superior courts and so the building contained two court rooms, what is today simply called the courtroom, as well as a secondary "minor" courtroom that was used by appellate panels of the Supreme Court. After the establishment of the Court of Appeals in 1969, the secondary courtroom was converted into a reception chamber for the chief justice.

=== Law library ===
The Temple of Justice originally housed the Washington State Library. Its neglected condition was described by the Tacoma News Tribune in 1955:

Housed in congested quarters in the basement of the Temple of Justice at Olympia is the Washington State Library which has become a maze of confusion because of lack of space. Irreplaceable books and papers are in danger of destruction because they cannot be given proper care … rare historical documents and newspaper files share space with office files under steam and water pipes. Much of this material is deteriorating faster than staff members can repair it. No public reading space is available, books are piled high and narrow aisles are often completely blocked.

By 1959 the situation had been remedied with the construction of a new state library at what would later be named the Joel M. Pritchard Building. The site of the former state library in the Temple of Justice was refurbished and converted to a dedicated law library.

== See also ==
- United States Supreme Court Building
- Washington State Capitol
