= 3 Line (Sound Transit) =

Future light rail line in Seattle, Washington, U.S.

- Public presentation at Mariner High School, Everett

Overview
- Status: Planned
- Owner: Sound Transit
- Locale: Seattle metropolitan area, Washington, US
- Termini: Everett Station (north); Alaska Junction (south)
- Stations: 24 (8 new, 1 provisional)

Service
- Type: Light rail
- System: Link light rail

History
- Planned opening: 2035 (West Seattle); 2037 (Southwest Everett); 2041 (Downtown Everett)

Technical
- Number of tracks: 2
- Character: Underground, elevated, and surface
- Track gauge: 4 ft 8 1/2 in (1,435 mm) standard gauge
- Electrification: Overhead line, 1,500 V DC
- Operating speed: 55 mph (89 km/h)

The 3 Line (colored magenta) is a future Link light rail line in the Seattle metropolitan area in the U.S. state of Washington, to be managed by Sound Transit. Under preliminary plans, the line would connect Everett and Snohomish County to Downtown Seattle and West Seattle. It would share tracks with the 2 Line from southern Everett to International District/Chinatown station and replace the 1 Line. The line is planned to reuse existing tracks that are part of the 1 Line, which will rerouted through a new Downtown Seattle tunnel to be built for the Ballard Link Extension. The 3 Line comprises two projects that were approved in the regional Sound Transit 3 ballot measure, which was approved by voters in 2016.

The northern project is the Everett Link Extension, which has seven planned stations and covers 16.3 miles (26.2 km) between Lynnwood and Everett Station. As of 2026, the project is in the environmental review process and has an estimated cost of $11.6 billion. It has funding for six stations in Lynnwood and Everett; a seventh station at State Route 99 and Airport Road is provisional and would require additional funding. The southern four stations between Lynnwood and the Boeing Everett Factory area are scheduled to open in 2037, followed by the extension to Everett Station in 2041. The route of the Everett Link Extension is primarily elevated and follows Interstate 5 except for a deviation to the west to serve Paine Field, which was selected in 2022 after it was endorsed by local political leaders. The project also includes an operations and maintenance facility that is scheduled to open in 2034 at one of three sites near Paine Field and the Boeing Everett Factory.

The West Seattle Link Extension at the southern end of the 3 Line comprises two stations and 3.9 miles (6.3 km) of track that travel southwest from SODO station on the 1 Line corridor. It is scheduled to open in 2035 and is estimated to cost $7 billion to construct. The extension includes a high bridge crossing the Duwamish River adjacent to the existing West Seattle Bridge and a tunnel to approach the terminus station at Alaska Junction, a major commercial district. The Duwamish River would be crossed by a cable-stayed bridge that is 1,690 feet (520 m) long and supported by two towers that are 374 feet (114 m) tall. The Federal Transit Administration issued their preliminary approval for the West Seattle project via a record of decision in April 2025.

The West Seattle project was originally anticipated to open in 2030 but was delayed after cost projections had risen. An additional station near Avalon Way and 35th Avenue West was removed in a May 2026 decision by the Sound Transit board of directors to save costs. The first major construction contractor for the West Seattle section was selected in October 2026 to build the Duwamish River bridge and elevated guideway near SODO station; construction is scheduled to begin in late 2027. The West Seattle section is anticipated to carry 26,000 daily passengers and take 15 minutes to reach Downtown Seattle.

== Stations ==
Names and locations for future stations are provisional.

| Station | City | Location | Planned opening | Type | Notes |
|---|---|---|---|---|---|
Everett Link Extension (Everett Station to Lynnwood City Center)
| Everett Station | Everett | Broadway at Pacific Avenue | 2041 | Elevated | Parking for up to 1,000 vehicles |
| SR 526/Evergreen | Everett | State Route 526 at Evergreen Way | 2041 | Elevated | |
| SW Everett Industrial Center | Everett | State Route 526 at Airport Road | 2037 | Elevated | |
| SR 99/Airport Road | Everett | Airport Road at State Route 99 | TBD | Elevated | Provisional station |
| Mariner | Everett | 4th Avenue West at 128th Street Southeast | 2037 | Elevated | 2 Line terminus; parking for 550 vehicles |
| Ash Way | Lynnwood | Interstate 5 at 164th Street Southwest | 2037 | Elevated | |
| West Alderwood | Lynnwood | Vicinity of Alderwood Mall | 2037 | Elevated | |
West Seattle Link Extension (SODO to Alaska Junction)
| Delridge | Seattle | Delridge Way Southwest near Southwest Genesee Street | 2035 | Elevated | |
| Alaska Junction | Seattle | Southwest Alaska Street near California Avenue Southwest | 2035 | Underground | |
