= Fountain of Creation (Seattle) =

Fountain and sculpture in Seattle, Washington, U.S.

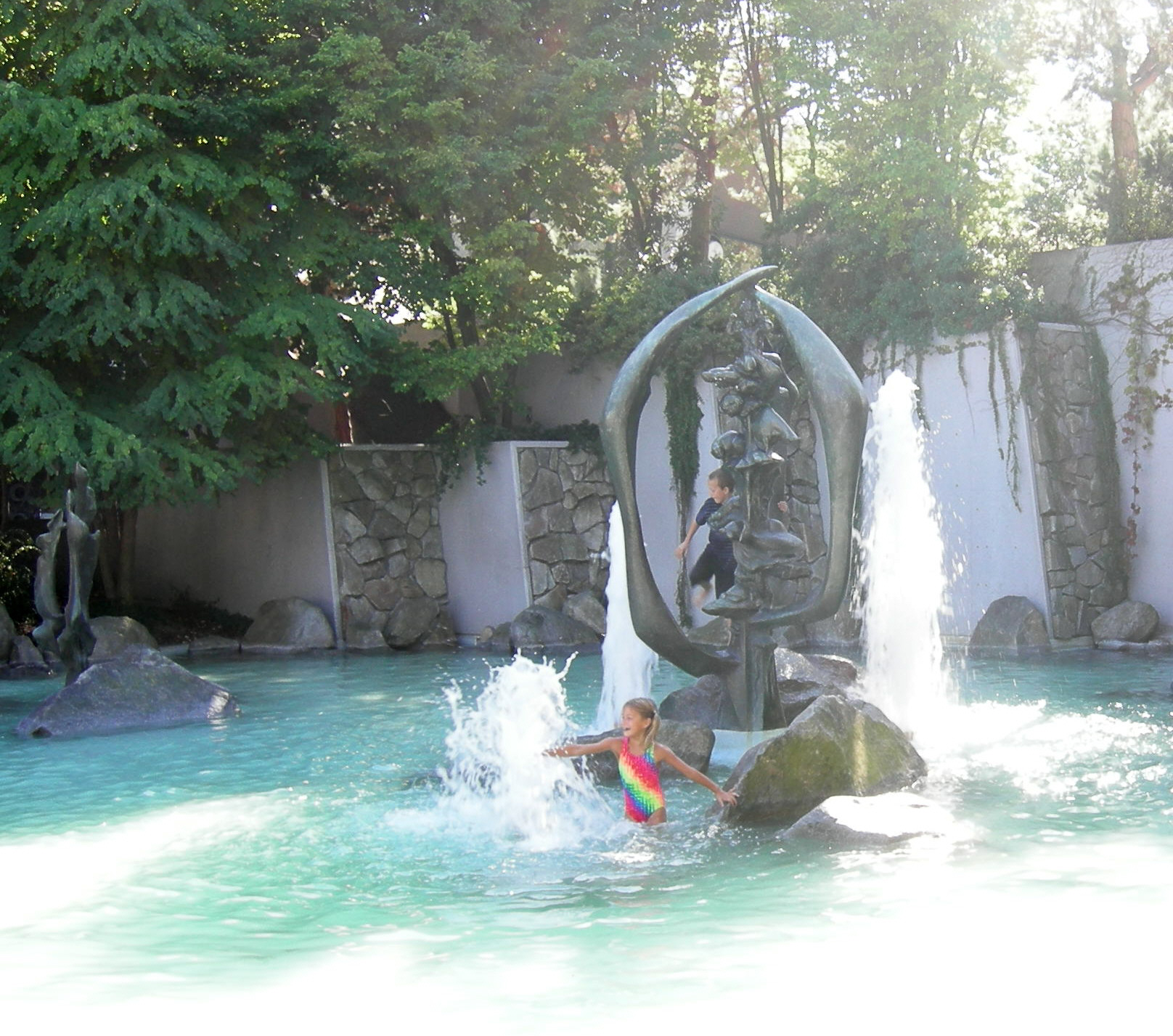
- The fountain in 2007
- Location: Seattle, Washington, U.S.
- 47°37′22.5″N 122°21′13.5″W

The Fountain of Creation, also known as DuPen Fountain, is a fountain by Everett DuPen in Seattle Center, in the U.S. state of Washington.
