= Ballard Link Extension =

Overview
- Status: Planned
- Owner: Sound Transit
- Locale: Seattle, Washington, US
- Termini: Ballard (north); SODO (south)
- Stations: 10
- Website: soundtransit.org

Service
- Type: Light rail
- System: Link light rail

History
- Planned opening: Initial segment: 2042; Full project: 2042 or 2060

Technical
- Line length: 7.7 mi (12.4 km)
- Number of tracks: 2
- Character: Underground and elevated
- Track gauge: 4 ft 8 1/2 in (1,435 mm)
- Electrification: 1,500 Volts DC, overhead catenary
- Operating speed: 55 miles per hour (89 km/h)

The Ballard Link Extension is a planned light rail project to be built by Sound Transit in Seattle, Washington, United States. It would extend the 1 Line of the Link light rail system north by 7.7 miles (12.4 km) from Downtown Seattle to Ballard with intermediate stops in South Lake Union, Lower Queen Anne, and Interbay. The Ballard Link Extension is planned to serve eight new stations and rebuild portions of two existing stations. The project would comprise a new tunnel through Downtown Seattle and South Lake Union as well as elevated sections in other areas. The initial segment, between Downtown Seattle and the Seattle Center, is planned to open in 2042; the entire project has a projected total cost of over $20 billion.

The Ballard–Downtown Seattle corridor had been served by local streetcars and buses since 1890. Proposals to build rapid transit to Ballard date back to the early 20th century and were included in two unsuccessful ballot measures under the Forward Thrust program in 1968 and 1970. Sound Transit and the city government began a joint study of a potential light rail line on the corridor in 2013 that endorsed a route through Interbay. It was included as part of the Sound Transit 3 (ST3) program, approved by voters in 2016, alongside an extension to West Seattle.

Environmental assessment for the combined West Seattle–Ballard project began in early 2018 and produced 24 early route options that would be among those studied in an environmental impact statement. The selection of a preferred alternative by Sound Transit was delayed due to opposition to a cut-and-cover station from residents in the Chinatown–International District neighborhood. Several design changes were made prior to the release of the draft environmental impact statement in 2022, which was followed by the selection of a preferred alternative for most sections; a decision for the Chinatown–International District neighborhood was deferred to a later date. A new route, which avoided construction of a station in the neighborhood's core, was selected as the preferred alternative in March 2023 but other options were retained for further studies. Due to delays in the planning process, the Ballard Link Extension was spun off into a standalone project in October 2023.

In May 2026, Sound Transit approved an updated expansion plan for projects in the ST3 program. The Ballard Link Extension was split into two segments, with construction funding available for the Downtown–Seattle Center segment. Funding for the rest of the project was deferred, with an estimated completion date of 2042 or 2060 depending on financial availability.

== History ==
=== Predecessor routes ===
The northwestern neighborhood of Ballard was originally incorporated as a city in 1890 and annexed into Seattle in 1906. The area was initially connected through ferries on Puget Sound, which were followed by the construction of the West Street and North End Electric Railway in November 1890. The privately-operated electric streetcar, one of the first in the area, ran for 6 miles (9.7 km) south from Ballard through Interbay and Downtown Seattle on Western Avenue to terminate in Pioneer Square. The operating company was acquired by Stone & Webster during their amalgamation of streetcar lines in Seattle; the first city-owned streetcar line opened in 1914 to connect Ballard and Downtown Seattle via the south side of the new Lake Washington Ship Canal. The more direct Interbay route was acquired by the city government in 1918 and absorbed into the municipal system that expanded with new service on 15th Avenue in 1927.

Ballard's streetcars were permanently replaced by trolleybuses on June 30, 1940, after the opening of the new Ballard Bridge. The Seattle Transit System operated two trolleybus routes along 15th Avenue Northwest between Ballard, Interbay, and Downtown Seattle until they were converted into motor coach routes in August 1963. These routes became part of Metro Transit in 1973 until a long-term suspension began in September 2023. They had been replaced as the primary transit route for the Downtown–Ballard corridor by the RapidRide D Line, which began service in September 2012 and incorporates some bus rapid transit features and more frequent service.

=== Rail proposals ===
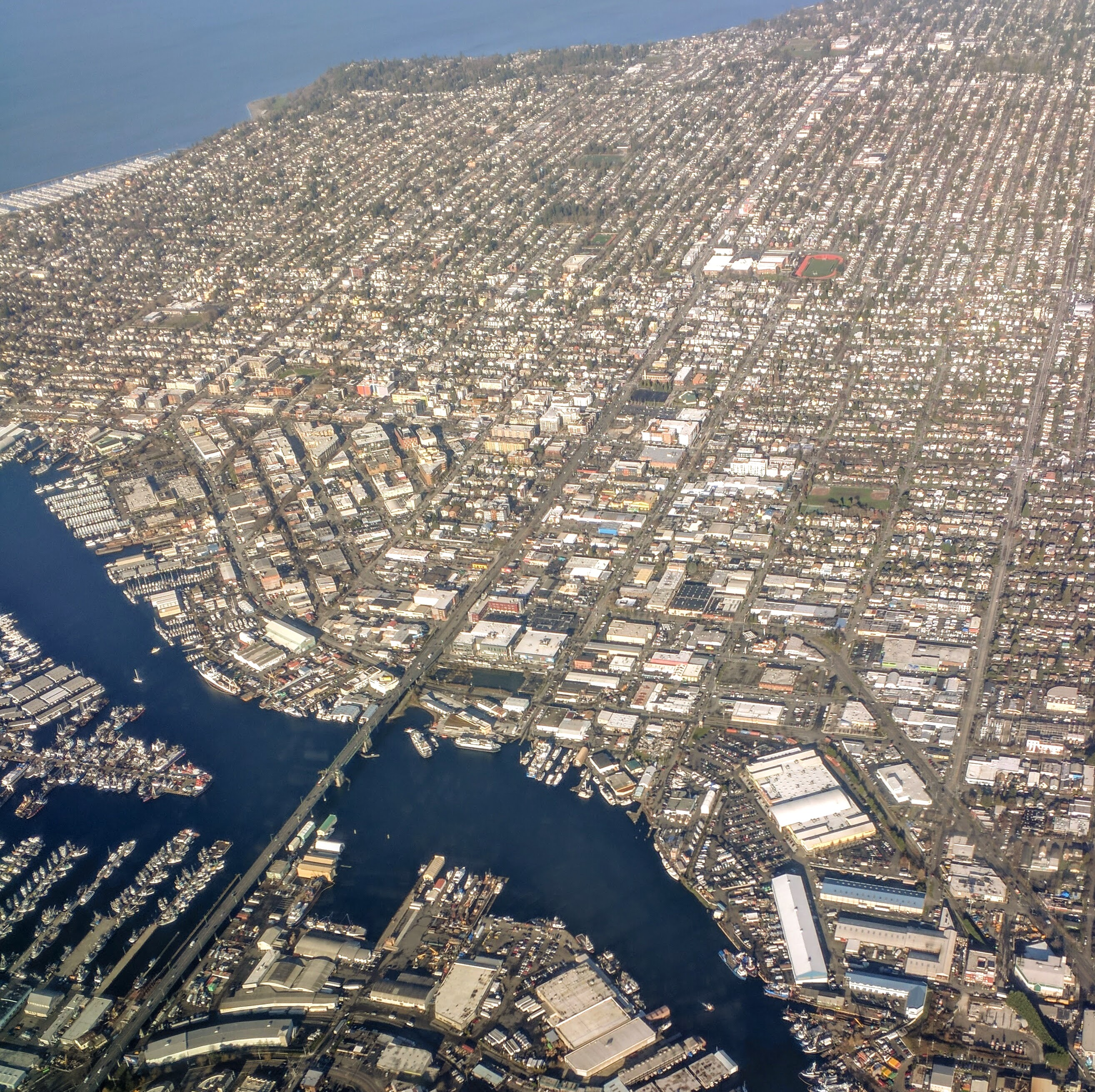
Aerial view of Ballard and the Lake Washington Ship Canal, 2016

Several unsuccessful proposals to finance the construction of a rapid transit system in Seattle and the surrounding area were made during the 20th century. These included plans that would serve Ballard and connect the neighborhood to Downtown Seattle via Interbay or other routes. Civic planner Virgil Bogue's 1911 comprehensive plan envisioned a subway line from Golden Gardens Park at Northwest 85th Street to Downtown Seattle, with elevated stations in Ballard, Interbay, and Lower Queen Anne. The 91-mile (146 km) rapid transit system was rejected by voters in March 1912. A new transit proposal emerged during the 1960s as part of the Forward Thrust ballot measures, a series of civic initiatives that would be funded by several cities around Seattle. The proposed 47-mile (76 km) system would serve 32 stations on four corridors, including one from Ballard to Downtown Seattle that would take approximately 15 minutes to traverse. The Ballard–Downtown line would have been tunneled under 15th Avenue Northwest from Crown Hill to the south side of the Lake Washington Ship Canal, elevated through Interbay, and enter a tunnel to serve the Seattle Center and Belltown. The February 1968 ballot measure failed to reach the 60 percent threshold required by the state government to issue municipal bonds to finance the local share of the $1.15 billion (equivalent to $7.89 billion in 2024 dollars) construction cost; Ballard itself had voted by a 6–4 margin against the program. A second attempt in May 1970 received only 46 percent approval due to the "Boeing bust", a local economic downturn caused by layoffs at Boeing, a major employer.

The Seattle Center Monorail, opened for the Century 21 Exposition in 1962, served a portion of the Ballard–Downtown corridor by providing a transit connection to the Seattle Center campus. Several proposals to expand it into a larger transit system were explored by the city government and other organizations during the late 20th century. A study that proposed a loop through the South Lake Union neighborhood was funded by a group of businesspeople in 1994 as part of the Seattle Commons park plan. The Elevated Transportation Company (later renamed the Seattle Monorail Project) was formed in 1996 to study a 40-mile (64 km) municipal monorail system with planning funds approved by voters the following year. The study would comprise corridors not already part of Sound Transit's planned light rail system—Link—that was scheduled to begin construction sooner. The first corridor, named the Green Line in 2002, was to cover 14 miles (23 km) from Ballard to West Seattle with intermediate stops in Downtown Seattle, at the Seattle Center, and in Interbay when completed in 2009. The line would have required a fixed bridge over the Lake Washington Ship Canal with a minimum clearance of 120 feet (37 m) to comply with U.S. Coast Guard recommendations. The monorail project was funded by a motor vehicle excise tax that did not meet projected revenues; it was also delayed two years due to design changes and a lack of willing bidders to construct the Green Line. By 2005, the original $1.75 billion cost ($2.91 billion in 2024 dollars) had been revised to $11 billion ($16.9 billion in 2024 dollars) due to more realistic construction projections and a longer debt payment plan. The city's voters rejected a measure to fund a truncated version of the Green Line in November 2005, which led to the formal disbandment of the monorail authority three years later.

The city government revived the Seattle Streetcar system with the opening of the South Lake Union Streetcar in 2007 and planned to expand the new network to several neighborhoods, including Ballard. Under one proposal, an extension of the South Lake Union line would continue on Westlake Avenue to Fremont and turn northwest on Leary Way to reach Ballard. The Seattle City Council adopted plans for streetcar routes in December 2008 but did not allocate funding to construct the four-line system. The Ballard–Fremont–Downtown corridor was included in the city's 2011 transit master plan update and funding for the project was included in a city transportation levy that was rejected by voters.

=== Light rail study and approval ===
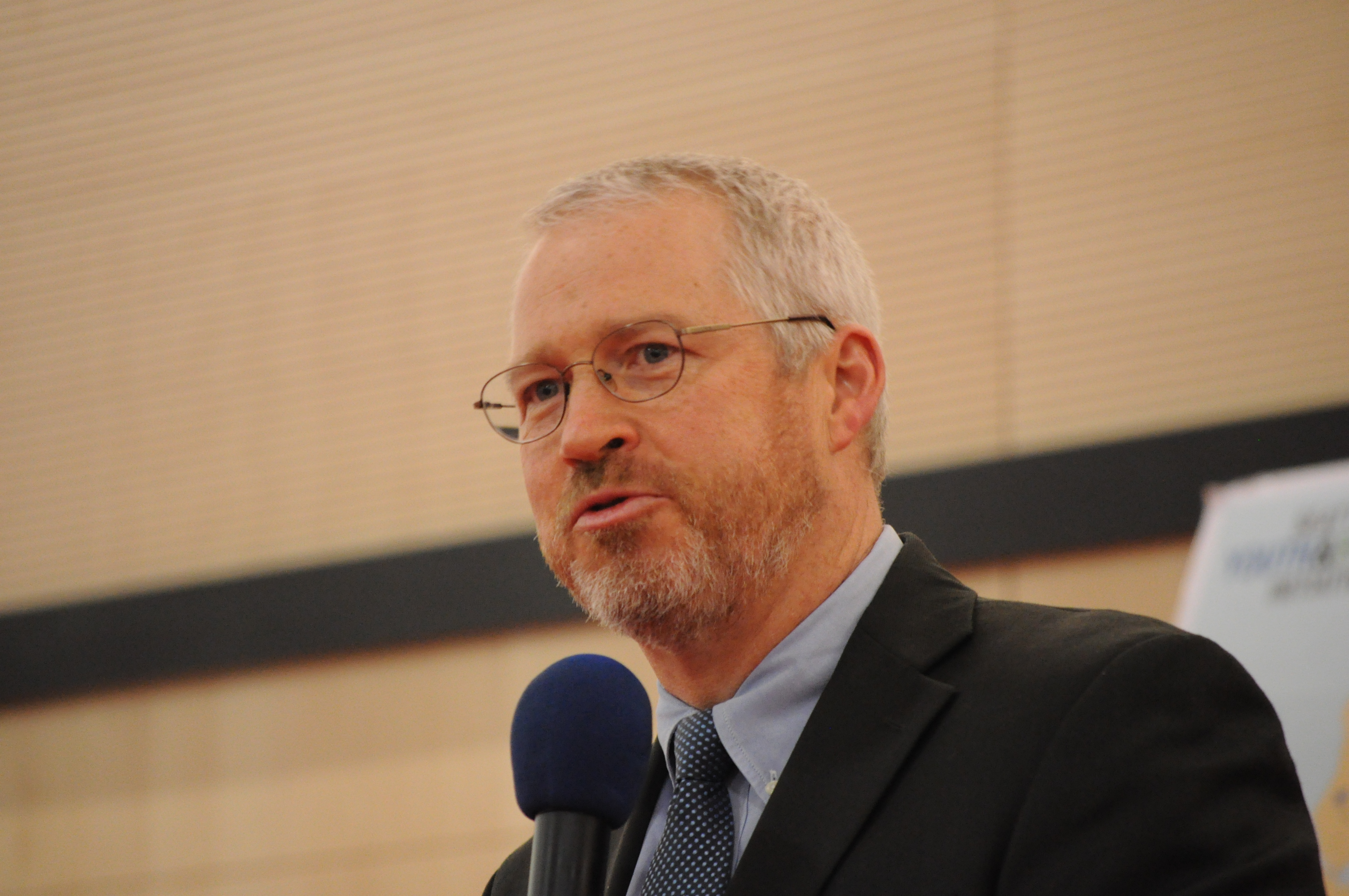
Seattle mayor Mike McGinn's campaign included an accelerated study of light rail extensions to Ballard and West Seattle

The Regional Transit Authority (now Sound Transit) included two Ballard corridors in its initial long-range plan, adopted in May 1996 ahead of a successful ballot measure to finance the first phase of the light rail system. The Ballard–Downtown and Ballard–University District corridors were both listed as potential rail extensions with an unspecified technology. A joint study with the Seattle city government for the two corridors was funded with $800,000 in federal grants, city revenues, and $2 million allocated in the Sound Transit 2 ballot measure that was approved by voters in 2008. Seattle mayor Mike McGinn had proposed an accelerated study of light rail extensions to Ballard and West Seattle during his 2009 campaign as an alternative to the state government's plans to replace the Alaskan Way Viaduct with a highway tunnel. The Ballard study began in early 2013 with plans to select a project in time for a potential regional transit ballot measure in 2016. The early corridor options included a rapid streetcar on Westlake Avenue, a bored tunnel under Queen Anne Hill, and a new bridge over the Lake Washington Ship Canal dedicated to transit uses.

Sound Transit and the Seattle Department of Transportation completed their study of the Ballard–Downtown transit corridor in June 2014 and produced five route options: two that used elevated guideways in Interbay and connected to a downtown tunnel; one that ran at-grade through Interbay and Belltown; one that was fully tunneled and had stations in Queen Anne and Fremont; and a rapid streetcar that extended from South Lake Union to Fremont and Ballard. Several of the route options were further divided between a tunnel under the Ship Canal or a movable bridge with a 70-foot (21 m) clearance. The Ballard–Downtown corridor options through Interbay and on Westlake Avenue were selected in August 2015 as candidate projects for potential inclusion in Sound Transit 3, an expansion package that would be presented as a ballot measure. The preliminary concepts ranged in estimated cost from $1.73 billion for an at-grade route on Westlake Avenue to $5.31 billion for a grade-separated route with a new Downtown Seattle tunnel. The new downtown tunnel would be built in conjunction with a West Seattle project and allow for trains on the Tacoma–Seattle line (now the 1 Line) to continue to Ballard instead of using the existing Downtown Seattle Transit Tunnel.

The draft plan for Sound Transit 3 was released in March 2016 and proposed a Ballard–Downtown light rail line that would open in 2038 if approved by voters during the 2016 general election. The preliminary plan was a 7.1-mile (11.4 km) line with nine stations that would use a movable bridge over the Ship Canal and mostly follow 15th Avenue Northwest through Interbay to the Lower Queen Anne area with a mix of elevated and at-grade sections. The line would then continue into a new tunnel that serves South Lake Union, Downtown Seattle, and the Chinatown–International District neighborhood. It was estimated to cost up to $4.76 billion to construct and would carry 114,000 to 145,000 daily passengers with trains at a frequency of every six minutes. Sound Transit later modified the planned route to use a fully elevated guideway through Interbay, but rejected a request from community organizations in the Ballard area to replace the movable Ship Canal crossing with a tunnel due to its $450 million cost. The final plan, adopted in June 2016, moved the completion date for the Ballard line to 2035 and included funding from suburban areas in the Sound Transit district for the $1.7 billion downtown tunnel, which was described as a regional facility. Sound Transit 3 was passed by voters on November 8, 2016, and appropriated $4.2 billion to construct light rail to Ballard via a new downtown tunnel.

=== WSBLE planning and route debates ===
The project was combined with the West Seattle section and officially named the West Seattle and Ballard Link Extensions (WSBLE). In September 2017, Sound Transit awarded the project development contract for the WSBLE to engineering firm HNTB and set an overall budget of $285.9 million for preliminary engineering, which was expected to take five years. The environmental impact assessment process began in February 2018 with inter-agency and tribal meetings, in-person and virtual open houses that garnered 2,800 public comments, and neighborhood forums. By September, the overlapping advisory and review groups for the project had advanced a total of 24 route options—of which eight were in Ballard and four in Downtown Seattle. Among the proposals were a taller, 136 feet (41 m) fixed bridge over the Ship Canal, a station to serve Magnolia, relocating the South Lake Union station to the east side of the Seattle Center, and a deeper tunnel in Chinatown–International District. A panel of elected officials—including Sound Transit boardmembers—endorsed a western alignment through Interbay that shifted stations away from 15th Avenue West as well as a tunnel that would reach a Ballard station at a depth of 70 feet (21 m) under 14th Avenue Northwest. In 2019, contractors began geotechnical investigations at 100 sites on the WSBLE corridor with drilling and sampling to determine soil and underground conditions.

In May 2019, the Sound Transit Board selected a set of 27 route options for the WSBLE that would be studied in the draft environmental impact statement (EIS); the options were grouped into eight segments that each had several alternatives for various levels of additional funding. A single preferred alignment for the entire corridor was planned to be selected by the board, but input from agencies and elected officials delayed a final decision. The design for a new station in the Chinatown–International District neighborhood was initially a cut-and-cover tunnel that was replaced by four options at the request of local community organizations due to the planned disruption caused by street closures. A proposed tunnel to the west of the Ballard Bridge with a station at Northwest Market Street and 20th Avenue Northwest in Ballard, estimated to cost $450 million more than a movable bridge, was removed from consideration by Sound Transit in October. A revised cost estimate of $12.6 billion for the entire WSBLE project was released in January 2021; the increase from the original $7.1 billion estimate was attributed to higher costs for land acquisition and soil conditions that made construction more difficult. Following a decline in expected tax revenue due to the COVID-19 pandemic, the Sound Transit Board updated its timeline for all major projects in August 2021 and delayed the completion of the Ballard Link Extension to 2037 or 2039 if funding needs were not met.

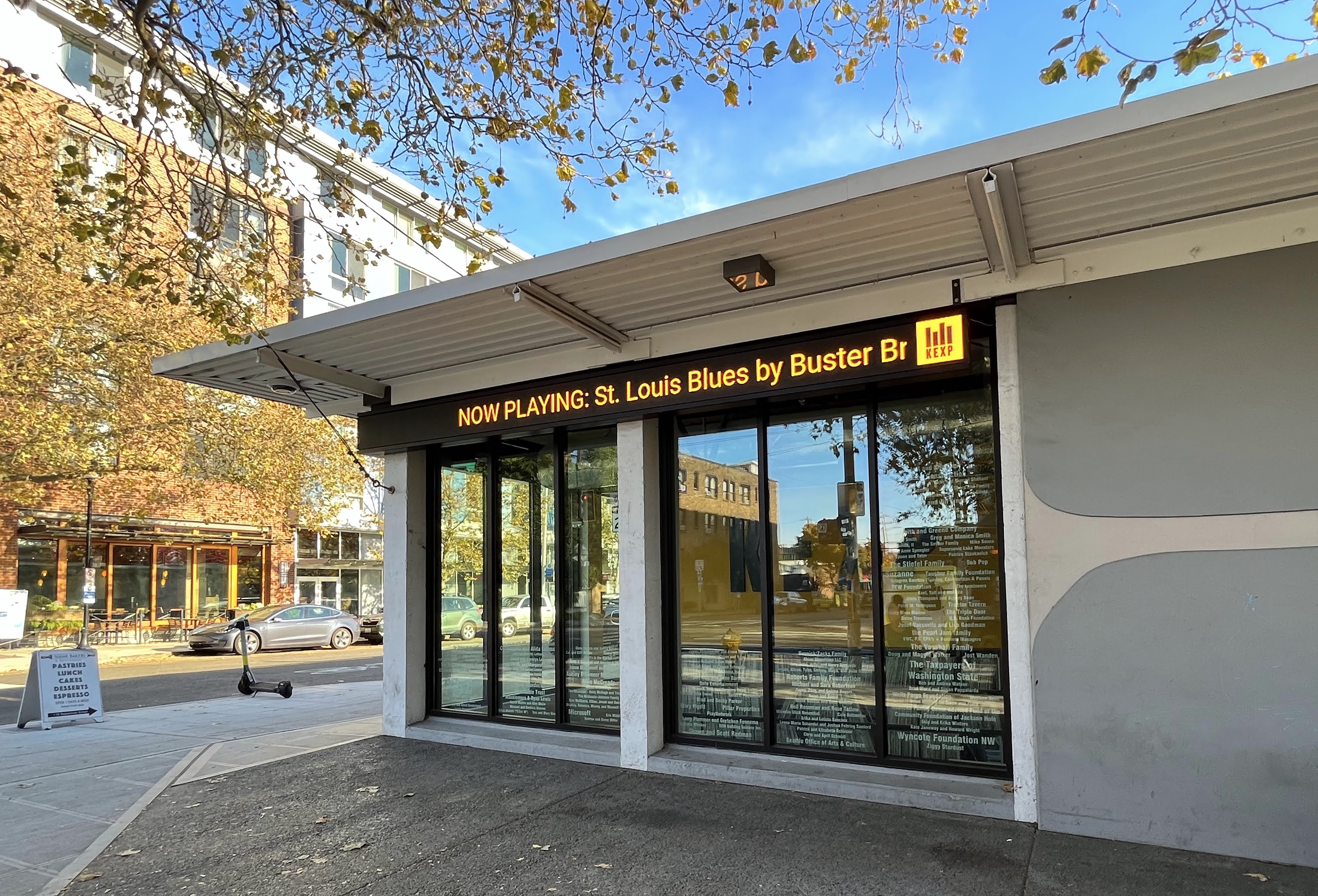
The KEXP studio at the Seattle Center, near a proposed station site

The draft EIS for the WSBLE project, published in January 2022, named a preferred alternative for the Downtown Seattle and Interbay sections alongside several options carried forward for the Chinatown–International District and Ballard sections. The selected tunnel in Downtown Seattle would follow 5th Avenue with two stations—Midtown at Madison Street near the Seattle Central Library and the existing Westlake station in the Downtown Seattle Transit Tunnel. Both stations would have platforms at a depth of at least 140 feet (43 m) and require long escalator and elevator rides to reach the surface. The Seattle City Council endorsed most of the preferred alternative, but supported a Ballard terminus to the west of 15th Avenue Northwest and a relocated station for the Seattle Center on Mercer Street at the request of KEXP and other arts organizations. The city council did not endorse a specific station location in the Chinatown–International District area amid opposition from local residents for an option on 5th Avenue South. In July, the Sound Transit Board named their preferred alternative. It comprised a terminus on 14th Avenue Northwest in Ballard, a high-level bridge over the Ship Canal with a clearance of 136 feet (41 m), an elevated alignment on the west side of the BNSF Railway's Interbay yard, and a tunnel from Lower Queen Anne to South Lake Union near Republican Street and Downtown Seattle on 5th Avenue. The board also declined to choose a Chinatown–International District station site and directed the agency to study further options and continue public engagement. The U.S. Coast Guard later specified that the clearance of the fixed bridge would need to be increased to 205 feet (62 m) to accommodate taller boats.

During community workshops in the Chinatown–International District, a station site at South Dearborn Street emerged as an alternative to constructing platforms adjacent to the existing International District/Chinatown station. A local real estate developer, Urban Visions, lobbied for the new site to be added to the Ballard Link plans through meetings with elected officials. In March 2023, King County Executive Dow Constantine and Seattle mayor Bruce Harrell—both members of the Sound Transit Board—endorsed plans for a set of "split" stations to serve Chinatown–International District and the redevelopment of the county government's Seattle campus. A "North of CID" station would replace Midtown station and be located on 4th Avenue adjacent to Pioneer Square station in the existing tunnel; the two stations would be connected by an underground passageway. A "South of CID" station would be constructed on 6th Avenue South near South Dearborn Street on land owned by Urban Visions. The Sound Transit Board approved the split stations in its preferred alternative for the Ballard Link project alongside further study of the original proposed site on 4th Avenue South and a 15th Avenue Northwest alignment for the Ballard tunnel terminus. A station serving the Denny Triangle neighborhood was shifted west to avoid a closure of Westlake Avenue during construction at the request of Amazon, a major employer in the area. The changes, all to be studied in the final EIS, caused a two-year in the planning timeline that had been set for the project.

=== Standalone project ===
The Ballard Link Extension project was split from the West Seattle Link Extension in October 2023 due to the design changes in Downtown Seattle causing delays in the former's environmental review process. The standalone project was estimated to cost $11.2 billion at the time and would remain scheduled to open in 2039. In May 2024, the Sound Transit Board decided against further study into a proposal to move the South Lake Union station to the west side of Aurora Avenue North and shift the Denny Triangle station away from Westlake Avenue. The relocated stations had been favored by Amazon and other large businesses, but were found to add over $500 million in additional costs to the project. The standalone Ballard Link project required the development of a new draft EIS, which began with a new scoping process in October 2024.

In August 2025, Sound Transit updated its program-wide financial plan for its capital projects to reflect the inflation surge that had driven up construction costs. The cost estimate for Ballard Link was revised to a minimum of $20.1 billion and maximum of $22.6 billion. To address a potential shortfall, King County Councilmember and Sound Transit boardmember Claudia Balducci suggested a study to determine whether the new downtown tunnel in Ballard Link could be replaced by modifications to the existing Downtown Seattle Transit Tunnel. The study was released in December and presented two new options: an "interlined" system with three lines in the existing tunnel; and a "stub end" that would not build the tunnel south of Westlake station until further funding was available. Both options were determined to have potential cost savings of up to $4.5 billion, but the interlined concept would require a multi-year closure of the transit tunnel to allow Ballard Link's trains to continue south at Symphony station. The "stub end" would require trains to operate as a separate line, labeled as the "5 Line", and the construction of a new operations and maintenance facility.

A program-wide realignment for the ST3 projects was approved by the Sound Transit Board in May 2026 to address the agency's budget shortfall. It included funding the construction of an initial segment for the Ballard Link project between Downtown Seattle and the Seattle Center, while the rest was deferred beyond the design phase. An amendment proposed by Seattle councilmember Dan Strauss to instead build the "stub end" from Westlake to Ballard was defeated by the board. As of 2026, the Ballard Link draft EIS is expected to be published in late 2026 and followed by a final EIS and record of decision from the Federal Transit Administration. Service on the initial segment from SODO to Seattle Center is planned to begin in 2042 at a cost of $18 billion. The final segment between Seattle Center and Ballard would open in 2060 but would be able to open in 2042 if up to $10 billion in additional funding is identified and allocated by 2033 to accelerate land purchases and construction contracts. During construction of the Denny station, service on the South Lake Union Streetcar is expected to be paused for up to eight years due to street closures on Westlake Avenue.

== Route ==
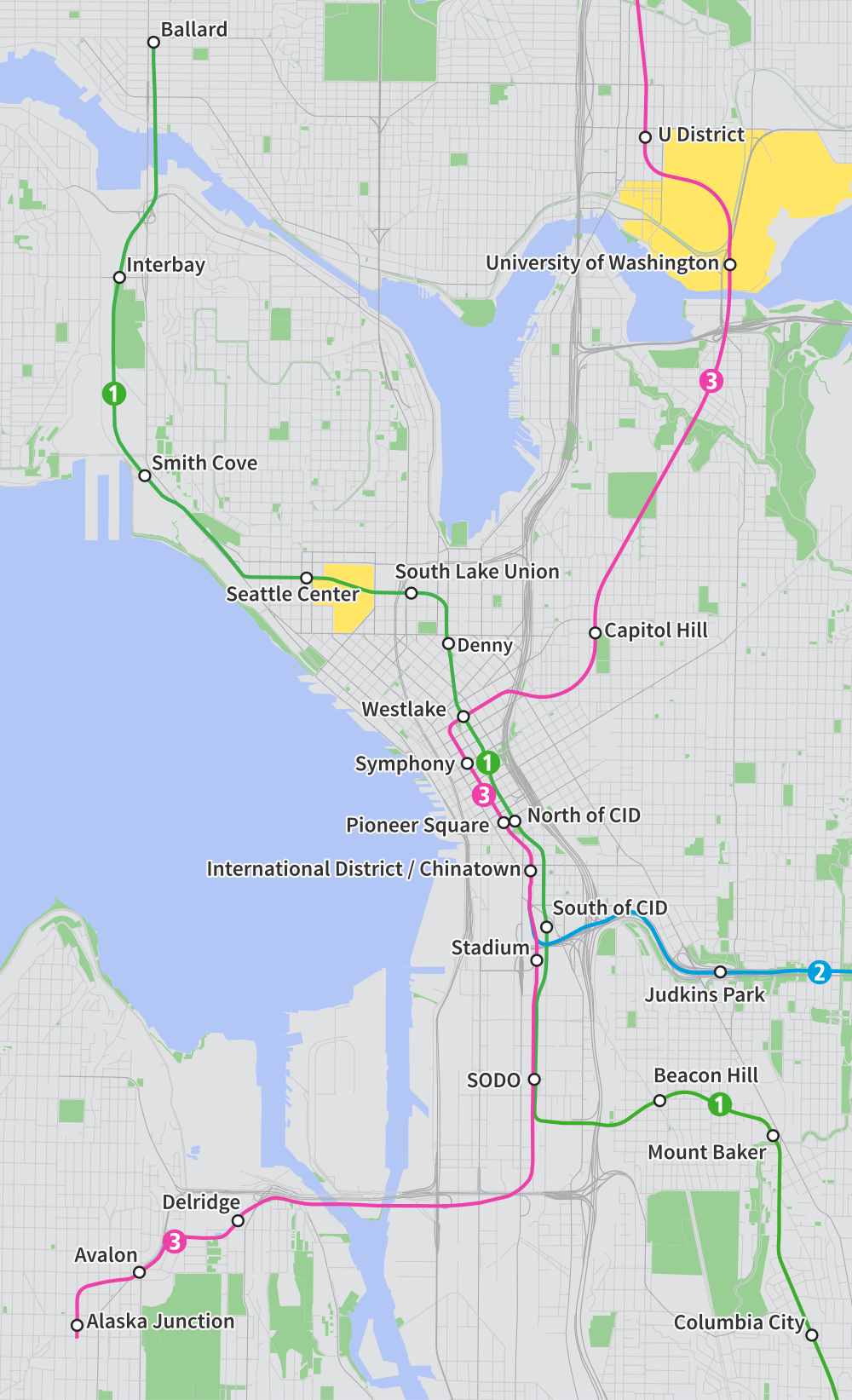
Map of the preferred alternative for Ballard Link and other Link light rail lines in Seattle

The preferred alternative selected for Ballard Link in 2023 is 7.7 miles (12.4 km) long and includes up to nine stations that would be added to the 1 Line. It begins at an underground station in Ballard on the south side of Northwest Market Street adjacent to its intersection with 15th Avenue Northwest; the platform would be 140 feet (43 m) below street level. Light rail trains would then travel south under Salmon Bay at the entrance of the Lake Washington Ship Canal and turn southwest to follow Thorndyke Avenue West and reach a station at West Dravus Street in Interbay. Other alternatives would use a fixed bridge over Salmon Bay parallel to the existing Ballard Bridge and an elevated station on 15th Avenue Northwest or 14th Avenue Northwest. The tracks then follow the east side of the BNSF Railway's Scenic Subdivision to a station at Smith Cove that is 65 feet (20 m) above street level near West Galer Street and the Magnolia Bridge. The preferred alternative crosses over Elliott Avenue West and travels southeast along the slope of Kinnear Park to reach a tunnel portal at West Republican Street and 5th Avenue West.

A new downtown light rail tunnel would travel east along Republican Street through the Lower Queen Anne neighborhood and stop at a station between 1st and 2nd avenues to serve the Seattle Center and Climate Pledge Arena. The station is adjacent to the studios for radio station KEXP and several arts organizations, which voiced their opposition to the location and preferred an alternative site a block north on Mercer Street. The tunnel continues across the Seattle Center campus and moves a block south to follow Harrison Street to South Lake Union station at 7th Avenue North near the north portal of the State Route 99 tunnel. From South Lake Union, the tracks would turn south to follow Westlake Avenue and stop at an underground station on the south side of Denny Way in the preferred alternative; another site on the north side of Denny Way at Terry Avenue is also included in the draft EIS. The tunnel then continues to an expansion of the existing Westlake station, an interchange that connects to the 2 Line and 3 Line in the Downtown Seattle Transit Tunnel. The new platforms for Ballard Link would be 135 feet (41 m) below street level and require passengers to traverse several sets of escalators or two elevators to make transfers.

From Westlake station, the preferred alternative for the tunnel continues south through Downtown Seattle to the "North of CID" station at 4th Avenue and Jefferson Street. This station would have an underground connection one block west to Pioneer Square station in the Downtown Seattle Transit Tunnel. Another alternative to be studied in the EIS places this station, named Midtown, 140 feet (43 m) under 5th Avenue between Columbia and Madison streets with entrances near the Seattle Central Library and Seattle Municipal Tower. The tunnel would then continue south into the Chinatown–International District neighborhood, where the preferred alternative has a station (named "South of CID") at 6th Avenue South and South Dearborn Street. The Sound Transit Board also directed further study of other alternatives that would place the station adjacent to Union Station on 4th Avenue South and the existing International District/Chinatown station on 5th Avenue South. The tunnel would continue under Interstate 90 and end near South Holgate Street with tracks continuing parallel to the future 3 Line along the right-of-way of the SODO Busway. Trains from Ballard on the 1 Line would then travel into SODO station at South Lander Street, planned to be expanded for the West Seattle Link Extension, and continue south towards Tacoma.

=== Stations ===
The preferred alternative lists ten stations within the scope of the Ballard Link Extension, subject to further change. Names for future stations are provisional.

Ballard Link Extension station options
Station	Neighborhood	Location	Type	Connections and notes
Ballard	Ballard	Northwest 15th Avenue and Northwest Market Street; 47°40′06″N 122°22′33″W	Elevated	
Interbay	Interbay	17th Avenue West and West Dravus Street; 47°38′55″N 122°22′46″W	Elevated	
Smith Cove	Interbay	15th Avenue West and West Galer Street; 47°37′54″N 122°22′35″W	Elevated	
Seattle Center	Lower Queen Anne	West Republican Street and 1st Avenue West; 47°37′24″N 122°21′29″W	Underground	
South Lake Union	South Lake Union	Harrison Street and 7th Avenue North; 47°37′19″N 122°20′35″W	Underground	
Denny	South Lake Union	Westlake Avenue and Denny Way; 47°37′07″N 122°20′19″W	Underground	South Lake Union Streetcar
Westlake	Downtown	5th Avenue and Pine Street; 47°36′42″N 122°20′11″W	Underground	2 Line and 3 Line; Seattle Center Monorail; South Lake Union Streetcar
North of CID	Downtown Seattle	4th Avenue and James Street; 47°36′10″N 122°19′48″W	Underground	2 Line and 3 Line at Pioneer Square
South of CID	Chinatown–International District	6th Avenue South and South Dearborn Street; 47°35′42″N 122°19′34″W	Underground	
SODO	SoDo	SODO Busway and South Lander Street; 47°34′52″N 122°19′39″W	Surface	2 Line and 3 Line

== Service plans ==
Under the original Sound Transit 3 plan, trains on the 1 Line would use the entirety of the Ballard Link Extension and transition to their existing tracks near SODO station. The existing sections of the 1 Line north of SODO station would instead be served by the 3 Line, which would continue southwest to West Seattle. Trains on the extension are expected to run every 5 minutes during peak periods on weekdays and from 8 to 11 minutes at other times. Trips from Ballard to Westlake station in Downtown Seattle are estimated at 11 minutes, compared to 40 minutes for existing buses during peak periods. Sound Transit estimated in 2022 that all of the build alternatives for the Ballard Link project would have a ridership of between 132,000 and 173,000 by 2042. Of these, over 100,000 would be in the new downtown tunnel between the Seattle Center and Chinatown–International District.
