= Law of Washington (state) =

The law of Washington consists of several levels, including constitutional, statutory, regulatory and case law, as well as local ordinances. The Revised Code of Washington forms the general statutory law.

== Sources ==
The Constitution of Washington is the foremost source of state law. Legislation is enacted by the Washington State Legislature, published in the Laws of Washington, and codified in the Revised Code of Washington. State agency regulations (sometimes called administrative law) are published in the Washington State Register and codified in the Washington Administrative Code. Washington's legal system is based on common law, which is interpreted by case law through the decisions of the Supreme Court and Court of Appeals, which are published in the Washington Reports and Washington Appellate Reports, respectively. Counties, cities, and towns may also promulgate local ordinances.

=== Constitution ===
The foremost source of state law is the Constitution of Washington. The Washington Constitution in turn is subordinate to the Constitution of the United States, which is the supreme law of the land.

=== Legislation ===
Pursuant to the state constitution, the Washington State Legislature has enacted legislation. Its session laws are published in the Laws of Washington, which in turn have been codified, compiled, and/or consolidated in the Revised Code of Washington (RCW). Both are published by the Washington State Statute Law Committee and the Washington State Code Reviser which it employs and supervises.

=== Regulations ===
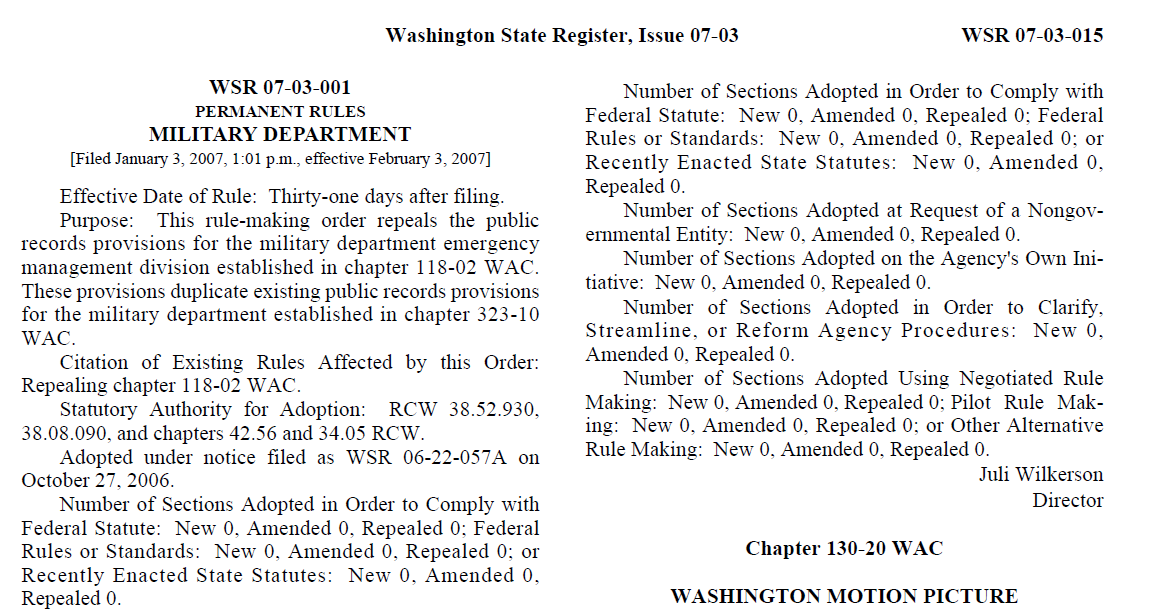
The Washington State Register is the official government gazette.

Pursuant to certain statutes, state agencies have promulgated regulations, also known as administrative law. The Washington State Register (WSR) is a biweekly publication that includes notices of proposed and expedited rules, emergency and permanently adopted rules, public meetings, requests for public input, notices of rules review, executive orders of the Governor, court rules, summary of attorney general opinions, juvenile disposition standards, and the state maximum interest rate. The Washington Administrative Code (WAC) codifies or compiles the regulations and arranges them by subject or agency, and is updated twice a month. There are also many agencies with quasi-judicial authority to hold hearings and make decisions. The Washington State Register is published by the Statute Law Committee, and the Washington Administrative Code is compiled and published under the authority of its Code Reviser.

=== Case law ===
The legal system of Washington is based on the common law. Like all U.S. states except Louisiana, Washington has a reception statute providing for the "reception" of English law. All statutes, regulations, and ordinances are subject to judicial review. Pursuant to common law tradition, the courts of Washington have developed a large body of case law through the decisions of the Washington Supreme Court and Washington Court of Appeals.

The decisions of the Supreme Court and Court of Appeals are published in the Washington Reports and Washington Appellate Reports, respectively. Both are published by LexisNexis, while slip opinions are published on the Internet. The Reporter of Decisions is the constitutional officer of the Supreme Court that prepares the decisions and opinions of the Supreme Court and the Court of Appeals for publication in the official court reports. Cases from Washington appellate courts are also reported in the unofficial Pacific Reporter. From 1854 to 1889, opinions of the territorial Supreme Court were published in the three volumes of the Washington Territory Reports.

=== Local ordinances ===
The legislative bodies of counties, cities, and towns may adopt ordinances, resolutions, rules, regulations, motions, and orders, violations of which are punishable by a maximum of 90 days in jail and a $1,000 fine, or for a gross misdemeanor one year in jail and a $5,000 fine. Alternatively, a legislative body may make an offense a civil infraction, but no city or county may establish a civil penalty for an act that constitutes a crime under state law, nor may it establish a different criminal punishment than that provided by state law for the same act. The power of the public to initiate ordinances by petition and to have enacted ordinances referred to the voters are only available in first class cities, code cities, cities or towns organized under the commission plan of government, and home rule counties.

All cities and towns are required to publish every ordinance in their official newspaper, although in lieu of publishing an entire ordinance a city or town may publish a summary. Counties must provide advance notice of proposed police or sanitary regulations prior to adoption by the legislative body, and the notice may either set out a copy of the regulation or summarize its content.

== See also ==
=== Topics ===
- Capital punishment in Washington state
- Felony murder rule (Washington)
- Gun laws in Washington
- LGBT rights in Washington (state)

=== Legislation ===
- List of Washington (state) ballot measures

=== Other ===
- Politics of Washington (state)
- List of law enforcement agencies in Washington (state)
- Crime in Washington (state)
- Law of the United States
