= Revised Code of Washington =

Laws and statutes of Washington state

The Revised Code of Washington (RCW) is the compilation of all permanent laws currently in force in the U.S. state of Washington. Temporary laws such as appropriations acts are excluded. It is published by the Washington State Statute Law Committee and the Washington State Code Reviser which it employs and supervises.

== See also ==
- Code Reviser
- Law of Washington (state)
- Washington Administrative Code
