= Pinehurst station =

Light rail station in Seattle

44 Pinehurst
- South entrance

General information
- Location: 13001 5th Avenue Northeast; Seattle, Washington
- Coordinates: 47°43′24″N 122°19′26″W
- System: Link light rail
- Operator: Sound Transit
- Platforms: 2 side platforms
- Tracks: 2

Construction
- Accessible: Yes

History
- Opened: September 30, 2026

Services
Preceding station	Sound Transit	Following station
Link
Shoreline South/148th toward Lynnwood City Center	1 Line	Northgate toward Federal Way Downtown
Shoreline South/148th toward Lynnwood City Center	2 Line	Northgate toward Downtown Redmond
Location

Pinehurst station is a light rail station in the Pinehurst neighborhood of Seattle, Washington, United States. It is served by the 1 Line and 2 Line of the Link light rail system, which is managed by Sound Transit. The elevated station comprises two side platforms on the north side of Northeast 130th Street adjacent to an interchange with Interstate 5. The 1 Line and 2 Line share tracks through the station and have service for 20 hours a day on weekdays and Saturdays and 18 hours on Sundays and holidays.

The infill station was deferred from the original Lynnwood Link Extension project, which constructed light rail tracks along Interstate 5 from Northgate to Lynnwood. The Northeast 130th Street station, later named for the Pinehurst neighborhood, was funded by the Sound Transit 3 ballot measure in 2016 and originally scheduled to open in 2031. A plan to accelerate the construction timeline was approved in 2020 and work on the platforms and overhead structures began in 2023. Pinehurst station opened on September 30, 2026.

== Description ==
Pinehurst station is located along the east side of Interstate 5 at its interchange with Northeast 130th Street and Roosevelt Way Northeast near Haller Lake and the Jackson Park golf course. Unlike other suburban Link light rail stations, Pinehurst lacks a parking garage for vehicles; it has 30 bicycle lockers in the station plaza. The station serves several outlying neighborhoods, including Bitter Lake and Lake City, through bus connections. Pinehurst station's public artwork was designed by Romson Bustillo and incorporates a porcelain enamel mural that covers 100 feet (30 m) at the south entrance facing Northeast 130th Street. Bustillo's mural use "glyphs" on panels to depict plants, animals, and other imagery inspired by the Pacific Northwest and his Filipino background. The enamel panels were fabricated in Tumwater.

Sound Transit initially estimated that the station would serve less than 1,000 daily riders by 2040, but ridership would grow if the area around the station are proposed and approved. A revised estimate in 2021 projected 3,100 to 4,600 daily riders, of which most would switch from adjacent stations.

== History ==
The 130th Street station was deferred from the final plans for the Lynnwood Link Extension, which was approved by the Sound Transit Board on April 23, 2015. Instead, a provision for future accommodation for construction of the station without impacting service was included in the board's resolution, at an estimated cost of $10 million.

Early stages of construction in 2022. Pinehurst is an infill station added to an existing elevated segment.

The station's construction was supported by advocacy groups from surrounding neighborhoods, including Bitter Lake to the west and Lake City to the east. The Seattle City Council passed a resolution in October 2013 recommending the inclusion of a station at NE 130th Street in the final environmental impact statement for the Lynnwood Link project. In March 2016, city councilmember Debora Juarez of the 5th district, which encompasses most of north Seattle that would be served by the station, criticized its exclusion and lack of priority when compared to other proposals in the Sound Transit 3 plan. She called the station "the focal point of a powerful east–west transit connection", citing a population of 90,000 residents who could benefit from feeder bus service to the station. The city council also recommended the formation of an urban area at the site of the proposed station, allowing for increased building heights and mixed-use development under the city's comprehensive plan. A 2013 report from Sound Transit determined that the station area held limited potential for transit-oriented development, citing existing single-family homes, the presence of Jackson Park and other undevelopable areas, and the low desirability for retail to develop at the site when considering proximity to Northgate Mall. Sound Transit expressed concerns over the inclusion of NE 130th Street station in the Lynnwood Link Extension, including a possible loss of federal funding proposed for the project after the record of decision was published without the station.

The draft plan for Sound Transit 3, a ballot measure for light rail expansion, was revised in May 2016 to include $80 million for an infill station at NE 130th Street that could open in 2031. Earlier plans had listed the station as provisional, deferred until additional funding could be found, but lobbying to the Sound Transit Board by Seattle councilmembers allowed for the amendment to pass unanimously. A proposal to open the station as soon as 2025 was presented to Sound Transit in January 2020, costing $23 million less than the estimate to build the station in 2031, but requiring additional debt to be raised sooner. In February 2020, the Sound Transit Board approved $29 million in funds for final engineering of the NE 130th Street station, with the goal of opening in 2025. Accelerated construction of the station is expected to cost $144 million.

An online open house was held in October and November 2020 to solicit feedback on the station's design elements; a majority of responses preferred a blue trim color over a green option. Due to the COVID-19 pandemic and its effects on local sales tax revenue, Sound Transit considered delaying the projected opening to 2036. The Sound Transit Board voted in August 2021 to maintain the projected 2025 opening by transferring funds from a delayed parking garage in Lake Forest Park. The station foundations and substructure were completed in early 2022 as part of work for the Lynnwood Link Extension. In June 2022, the board approved a $240 million budget to construct the NE 130th station, which was scheduled to open in mid-2026.

Work on the platforms and overhead structures began in late 2023. The construction zone on each platform was covered by a wall with temporary murals created by Romsom Bustillo, the commissioned artist for the station's permanent artwork. Work continued after regular service on the Lynnwood Link Extension began in August 2024. The station's permanent name, Pinehurst, was adopted by the Sound Transit Board in January 2025 after the conclusion of a public survey with several options. Other finalists included Pinehurst/130th, Pinehurst/Haller Lake, and North Seattle/130th. Construction of the roof began in January 2025 and required more than two months of service disruptions on the 1 Line, including single-tracking and reduced frequency during evenings on weekdays and all day on weekends. The installation of stairways at Pinehurst station began in March 2025 with work during track shutdowns and a continuation of the reduced schedule used for the roof work.

Pinehurst station opened on September 30, 2026, at the beginning of the service day at 5 a.m. A community celebration was held later in the day with live music and a pop-up store for Sound Transit merchandise.

== Service ==
A southbound 2 Line train at Pinehurst

The station is served by the 1 Line and 2 Line, both part of the Link light rail system. Pinehurst is the fourth southbound station from Lynnwood City Center, the northern terminus of both lines; Shoreline South/148th station is the next stop to the north and Northgate station is the next to the south. Link light rail trains serve Pinehurst station 20 hours a day on weekdays and Saturdays, from 5:00 a.m. to 12:00 a.m.; and 18 hours on Sundays, from 6:00 a.m. to 12:00 a.m. During regular weekday service, trains on each line operate roughly every eight minutes during rush hour, ten minutes during midday operation, and twelve to fifteen minutes in the early morning and at night. On weekends, trains on each line arrive at Pinehurst station every ten minutes during midday hours and every twelve to fifteen minutes during mornings and evenings. The two lines combine for frequencies of four minutes during rush hour and five minutes during midday and weekend service. The station is approximately 19 minutes from Westlake station in Downtown Seattle, 46 minutes from Bellevue Downtown station, and 47 minutes from SeaTac/Airport station.

King County Metro operates the sole bus route at Pinehurst station: a crosstown connector to Bitter Lake, Lake City, and the University District. The bus stops are located on Northeast 130th station on the south side of the station.
