= Link light rail =

Rail transit system in the Seattle metropolitan area

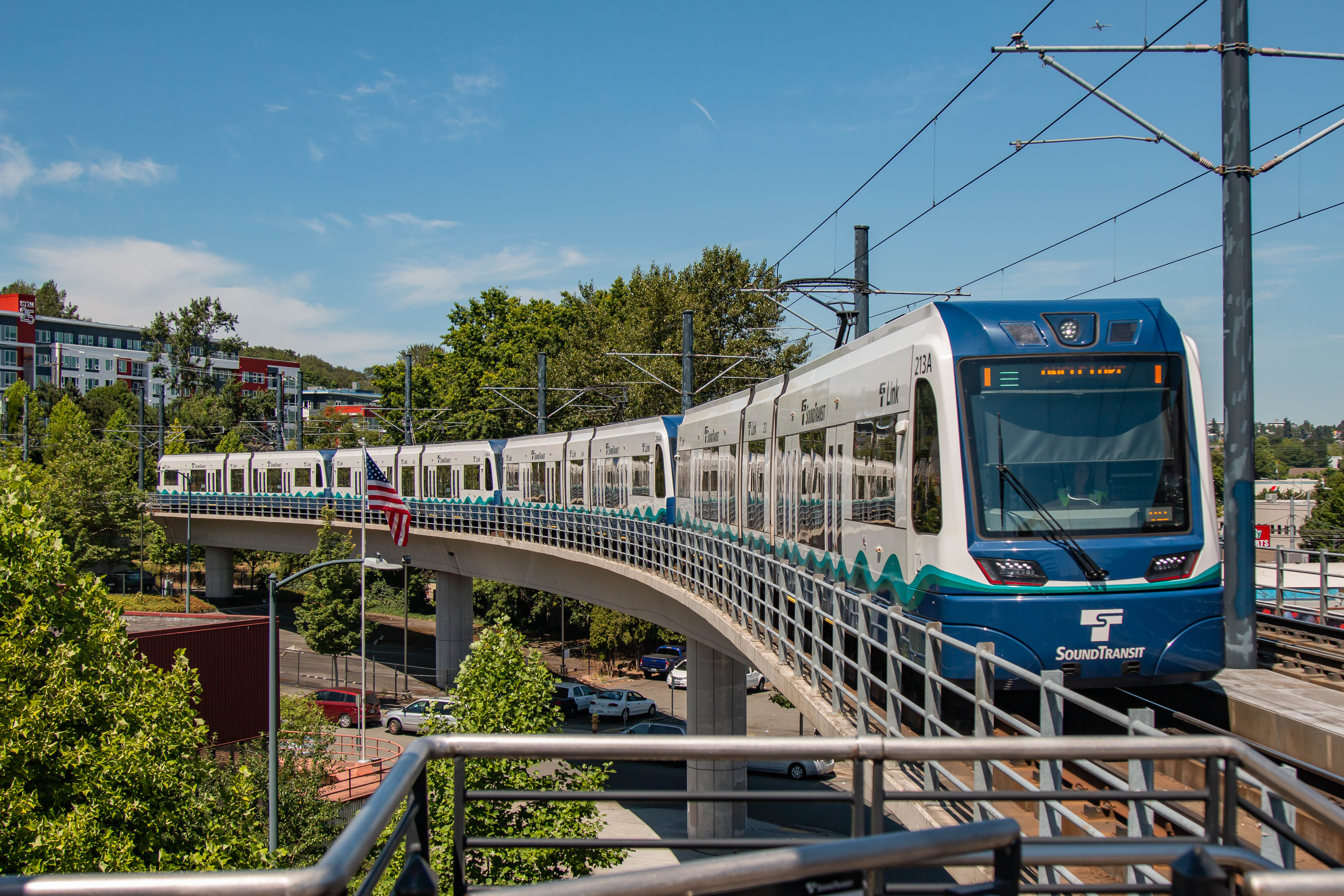
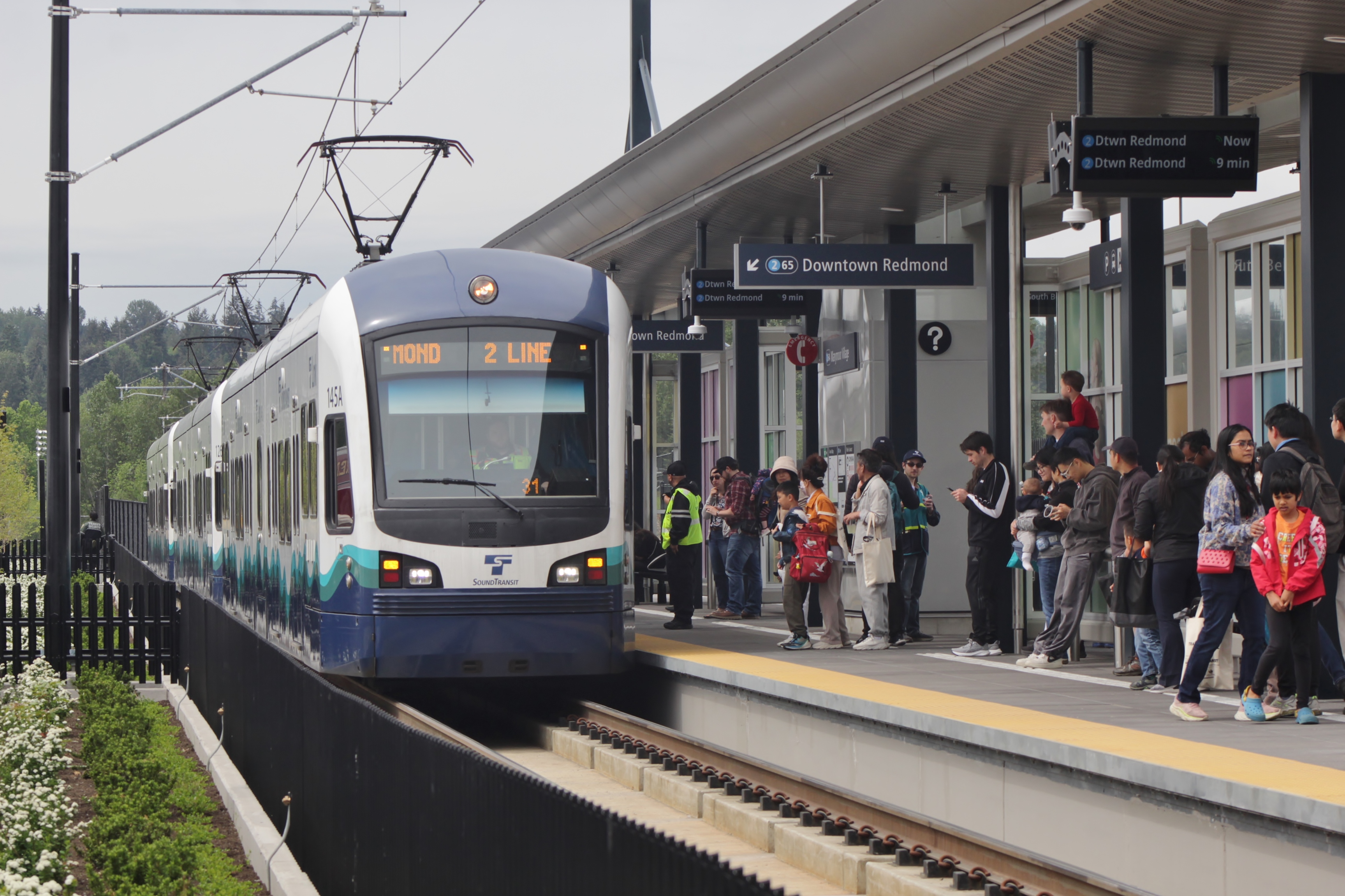
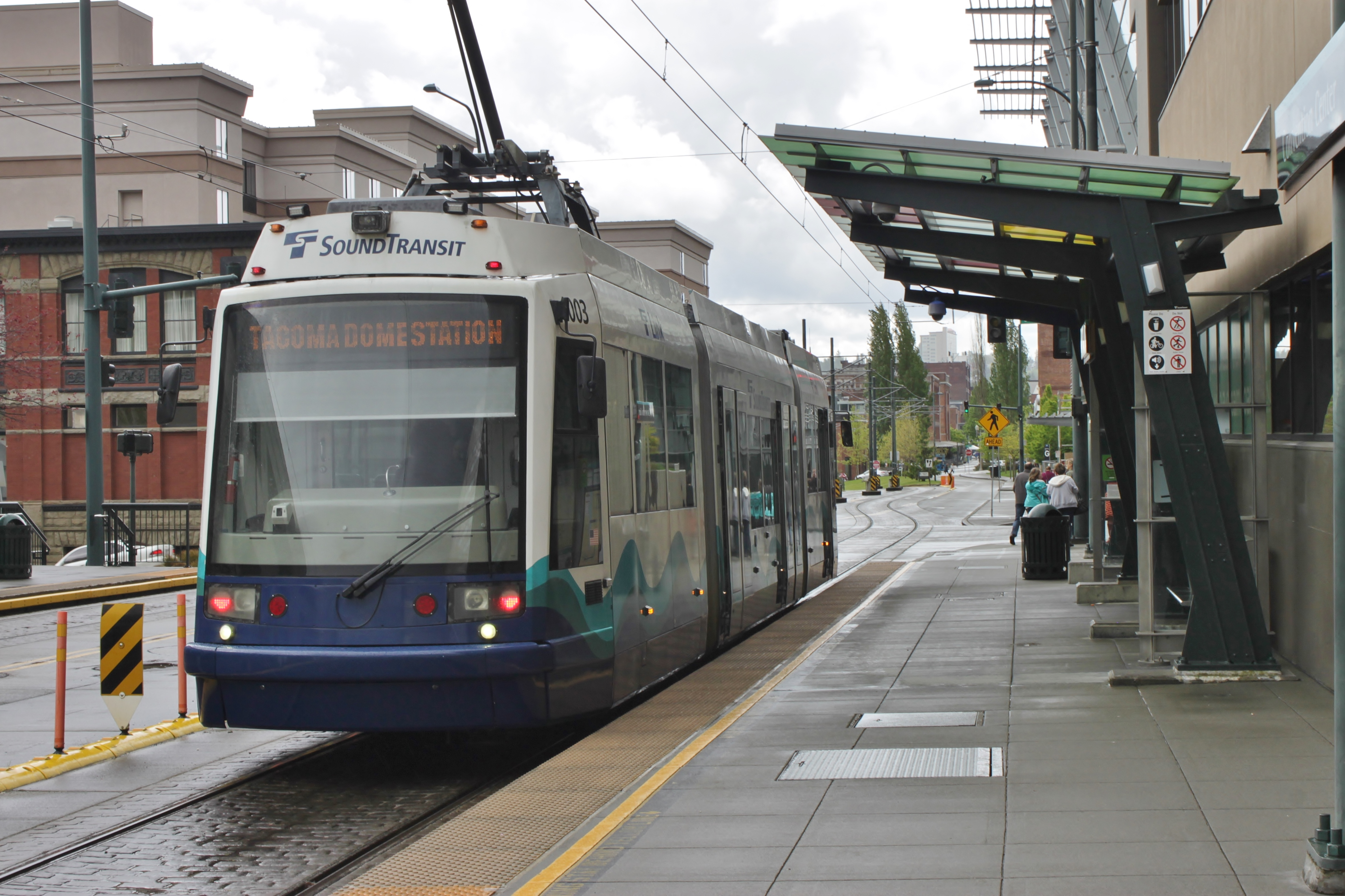
- Clockwise from top: the 1 Line near Mount Baker station, the T Line at Convention Center station, and the 2 Line at Marymoor Village station

Overview
- Owner: Sound Transit
- Locale: Seattle, Washington, U.S.
- Transit type: Light rail
- Number of lines: 3
- Number of stations: 51
- Daily ridership: 169,300 (weekdays, Q2 2026)
- Annual ridership: 39,095,611 (2025)
- Website: soundtransit.org

Operation
- Began operation: August 22, 2003; 23 years ago
- Operators: King County Metro; Sound Transit
- Character: At-grade, elevated, underground
- Number of vehicles: 226 (details)
- Train length: 1–4 vehicles

Technical
- System length: 62.25 mi (100.18 km)
- Track gauge: 4 ft 8 1/2 in (1,435 mm) standard gauge
- Electrification: Overhead line; 1,500 V DC (1 & 2 Lines); 750 V DC (T Line)
- Top speed: 55 mph (89 km/h)
System map
1 Line & 2 Line
T Line

Link light rail is a light rail system with some rapid transit characteristics that serves the Seattle metropolitan area in the U.S. state of Washington. It is managed by Sound Transit in partnership with local transit providers, and comprises three lines that total 63 miles (101 km) with 51 stations. The 1 Line and 2 Line travel on shared tracks from Lynnwood in Snohomish County to Seattle and split to serve other portions of King County. The 1 Line continues south to the Rainier Valley, Seattle–Tacoma International Airport, and Federal Way; the 2 Line crosses Lake Washington to the Eastside cities of Bellevue and Redmond. The T Line is disconnected from the other lines and operates as a streetcar for 4 miles (6.4 km) in Tacoma. In 2025, the system had a ridership of 39.1 million, or about 169,300 per weekday as of the second quarter of 2026, primarily on the 1 Line. Trains run at frequencies of 4 to 20 minutes.

The Link light rail system was originally conceived in the 1980s following several earlier proposals for a heavy rail subway system that were rejected by voters. Sound Transit was created in 1993 and placed a ballot measure to fund and build the system, which was passed on its second attempt in 1996. Tacoma Link began construction in 2000 and opened on August 22, 2003, becoming the first modern light rail system in the state. Central Link construction in Seattle was delayed because of funding issues and routing disputes, but began in November 2003 and was completed on July 18, 2009. The trains initially ran from Downtown Seattle to Tukwila International Boulevard station before being extended south to Seattle–Tacoma International Airport in December 2009. Further extensions north to the University of Washington and south to Angle Lake station opened in 2016 to complete most of the line's original planned route. An extension from the University of Washington to Northgate station opened on October 2, 2021, followed by a northern extension to Lynnwood City Center station on August 30, 2024, and a southern extension to Federal Way Downtown station on December 6, 2025.

The first phase of the 2 Line opened on April 27, 2024, between South Bellevue and Redmond Technology stations; an extension east to Downtown Redmond opened in May 2025. It was extended west to Seattle on March 28, 2026, following construction delays on a section crossing Lake Washington. The 2 Line and Lynnwood sections were funded by Sound Transit 2 (ST2), a 2008 ballot measure to expand the transit system, along with planning work for other projects. The Sound Transit 3 (ST3) ballot measure was approved in 2016 and funds plans to expand the Link network to 116 miles (187 km) and 83 stations by the 2050s. The expansions are planned to cover the metropolitan area from Everett to Tacoma, along with branches to Kirkland, Issaquah, and the Seattle neighborhoods of Ballard and West Seattle.

== History ==
=== Predecessors and earlier proposals ===
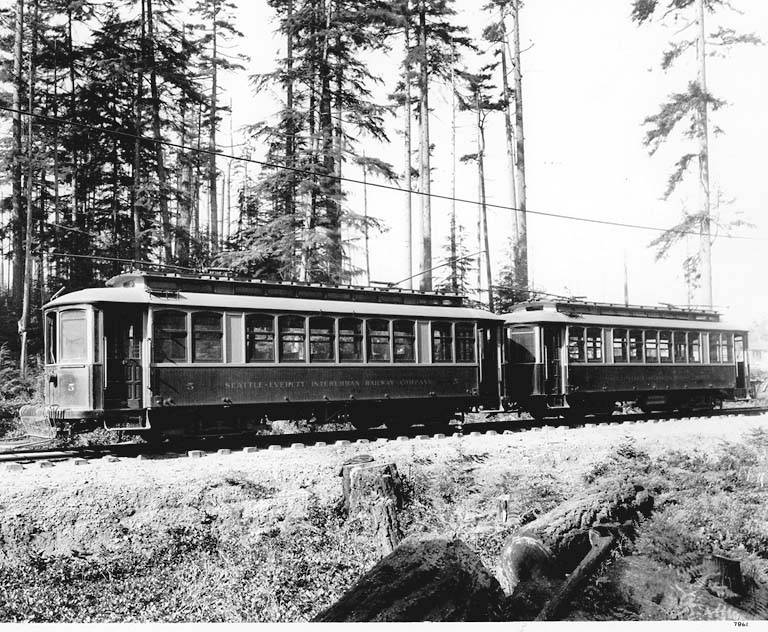
A train on the Seattle–Everett Interurban Railway

The first form of scheduled public transportation in the Puget Sound region was various steamboat ferries that later evolved into the "mosquito fleet" in the 1880s as the area's population grew. They were followed by streetcar systems, beginning with Seattle's first horse-drawn line in 1884 and Tacoma's in 1888, built by private companies alongside conventional railroads. Electric streetcars and cable cars debuted in 1889 under other companies and continued to grow outward into new residential developments called streetcar suburbs. The lines were consolidated into the Seattle Municipal Street Railway in 1919, which grew to 26 routes with 231 miles (372 km) of track. Interurban railways that connected Seattle to Everett and Tacoma were built by Stone & Webster, but ceased operations by 1939 due to competition from automobiles on new highways as well as financial issues.

Attempts to finance the construction of a rapid transit system to connect Seattle's neighborhoods, and later other cities in the region, first emerged with civil engineer Virgil Bogue's comprehensive plan in 1911. A referendum on the plan, which included 33 miles (53 km) of subway tunnels and 27 miles (43 km) of elevated tracks, was rejected by city voters the following year. The region's transit system faced chronic underinvestment and declining bus ridership as new highways and freeways, including Interstate 5 through Seattle, were constructed to serve a growing number of automobile users. A proposal for a 47-mile (76 km) Seattle subway system with suburban extensions to Bellevue and Renton was part of the Forward Thrust series of civic ballot measures in the 1960s. It would use federal funding to cover two-thirds of the $1.15 billion (equivalent to $8.11 billion in 2025 dollars) construction cost, contingent on the approval of local funding, and be completed by 1985. The transit ballot measure, in February 1968, was approved by 51 percent of voters but failed to reach the 60 percent threshold required by the state government to issue municipal bonds. A second vote in May 1970 received only 46 percent approval due to the "Boeing bust", a local economic downturn caused by layoffs at Boeing, a major employer. The federal funding that was earmarked for the Seattle project was instead reallocated to the Metropolitan Atlanta Rapid Transit Authority in Atlanta, Georgia.

The Seattle Transit System, which operated buses within the city, launched one of the nation's first express bus systems in 1970. The program drew new suburban riders but the system continued to face financial issues. King County voters approved a ballot measure in 1972 to acquire the Seattle Transit System and a private suburban operator to form a new countywide bus system that would be managed by the Municipality of Metropolitan Seattle, an existing water treatment and sewage agency. The bus system, named Metro Transit (now King County Metro), began operations in January 1973 and increased ridership from 30 million with Seattle Transit in 1971 to 66 million in 1980. Metro Transit's buses had difficulty navigating through Downtown Seattle, where 420 trips during peak periods led to congestion in bus lanes and at stops. The Downtown Seattle Transit Tunnel, with five stations on 3rd Avenue and Pine Street, was opened in September 1990; it would redirect bus trips from downtown streets but was also designed to be converted to future light rail use.

=== Rail plans and Tacoma launch ===
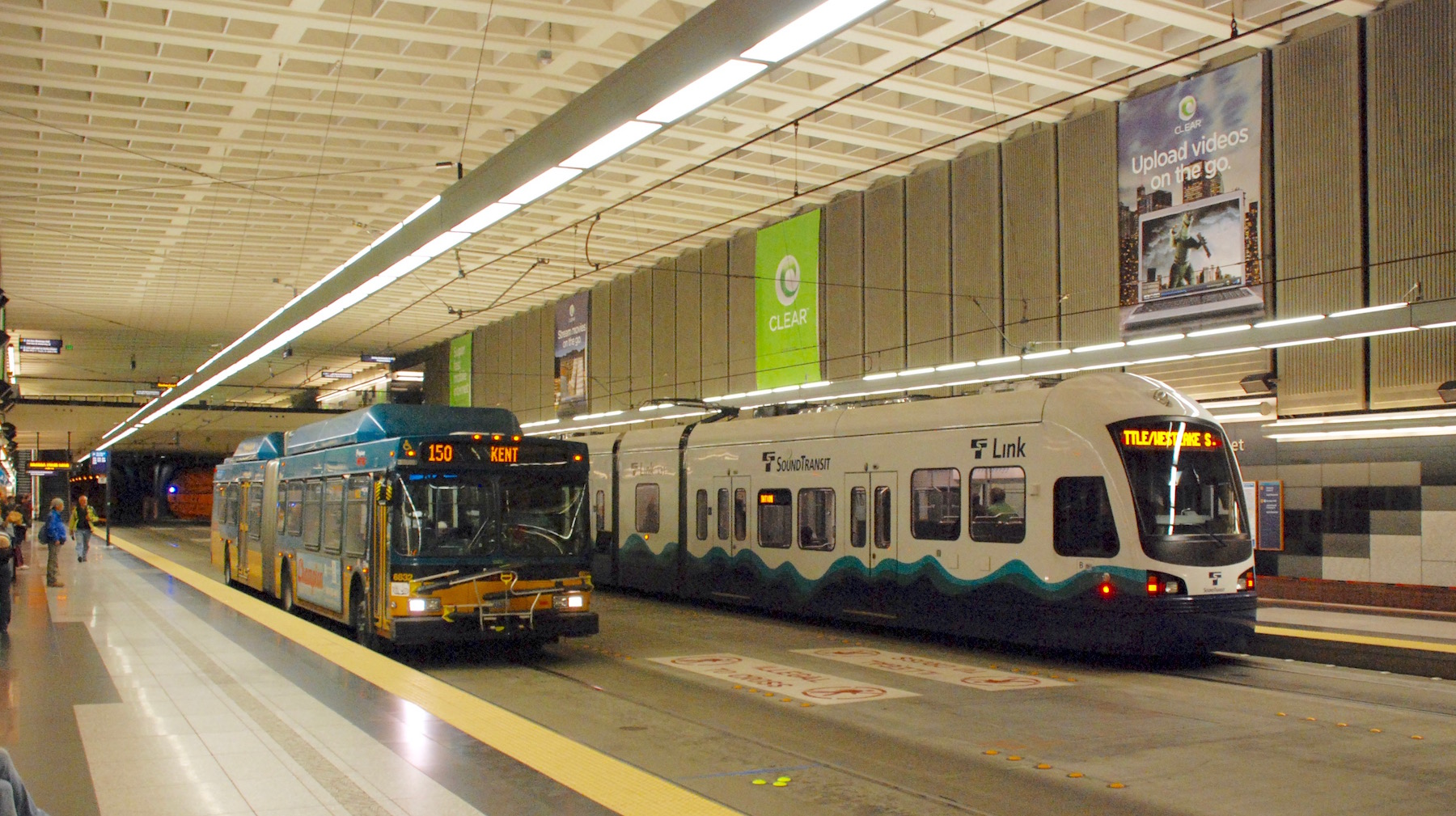
A King County Metro bus and Link train at University Street station (now Symphony station), 2010

In 1975, Metro began a long-term study into regional transit that was later merged with an effort from the Puget Sound Council of Governments (PSCOG), the region's designated metropolitan planning organization. A grant for the study from the Urban Mass Transit Administration was instead allocated to TriMet in Portland, Oregon, due to the federal government's reluctance to lose an "example all-bus system" like Metro Transit's. The regional transit study proceeded and their initial findings in 1981 recommended a light rail system that would be able to operate on streets in some areas but generally follow freeway corridors to regional centers. A related study from the Snohomish County Transportation Authority began in 1983 and determined an extension of a future light rail line along Interstate 5 would be feasible. The Metro–PSCOG study, published and adopted in 1986, recommended a 60-mile (97 km) light rail system with three lines from Downtown Seattle that followed freeway corridors: along Interstate 5 north to Lynnwood and south to Federal Way; and east across Lake Washington to Bellevue. The recommended system had a projected completion by 2020 if approved by voters and a cost of approximately $14 billion (equivalent to $34.8 billion in 2025 dollars) to construct.

A non-binding advisory ballot measure on accelerated development of a light rail system was approved by King County voters in November 1988. The state legislature authorized the creation of a regional transit board that would have representatives from King, Pierce, and Snohomish counties. Another study resulted in a long-range plan for a three-county transit system with 105 miles (169 km) of light rail from Everett to Tacoma and Redmond, along with commuter rail and express buses. The Central Puget Sound Regional Transit Authority (RTA) was formed in September 1993 after approval from the state legislature and the three county councils; the RTA would create a construction and financing plan for approval by voters in a regional ballot measure. Their first attempt, which included a 70-mile (110 km) light rail network with lines as far north as Lynnwood and as far south as Tacoma, had an estimated cost of $6.7 billion (equivalent to $12.9 billion in 2025 dollars). It was rejected by 53 percent of voters on March 14, 1995.

A revised RTA plan announced the following year scaled back the light rail component to a 25-mile (40 km) corridor between Seattle–Tacoma International Airport and University District in Seattle and a separate line that would connect Downtown Tacoma to a multimodal hub near the Tacoma Dome. The new package, named Sound Move, was estimated to cost $3.9 billion (equivalent to $7.38 billion in 2025 dollars) and would be funded by a sales tax and motor vehicle excise tax. It was approved by 56.5 percent of voters in the urbanized Seattle metropolitan area, including majorities in all three counties, on November 5, 1996. The RTA renamed itself to Sound Transit in August 1997 and adopted "Link" as the name for the light rail system along with Sounder for commuter rail and Regional Express for buses.

The Downtown Tacoma line, named Tacoma Link, was preceded by a shuttle bus from the new Tacoma Dome Station built by Pierce Transit in 1997. The project was anticipated to revitalize the city's downtown and serve the new University of Washington Tacoma campus along its 1.6-mile (2.6 km) route. Tacoma Link began construction in October 2000 and its rolling stock—three streetcars imported from the Czech Republic—arrived in September 2002. The line opened on August 22, 2003, with five stations, and cost $80.4 million (equivalent to $135 million in 2025 dollars) to construct. It had no fares and exceeded its 2010 ridership projections by early 2003, carrying its 500,000th passenger in April of the year.

=== Central Link planning and construction ===
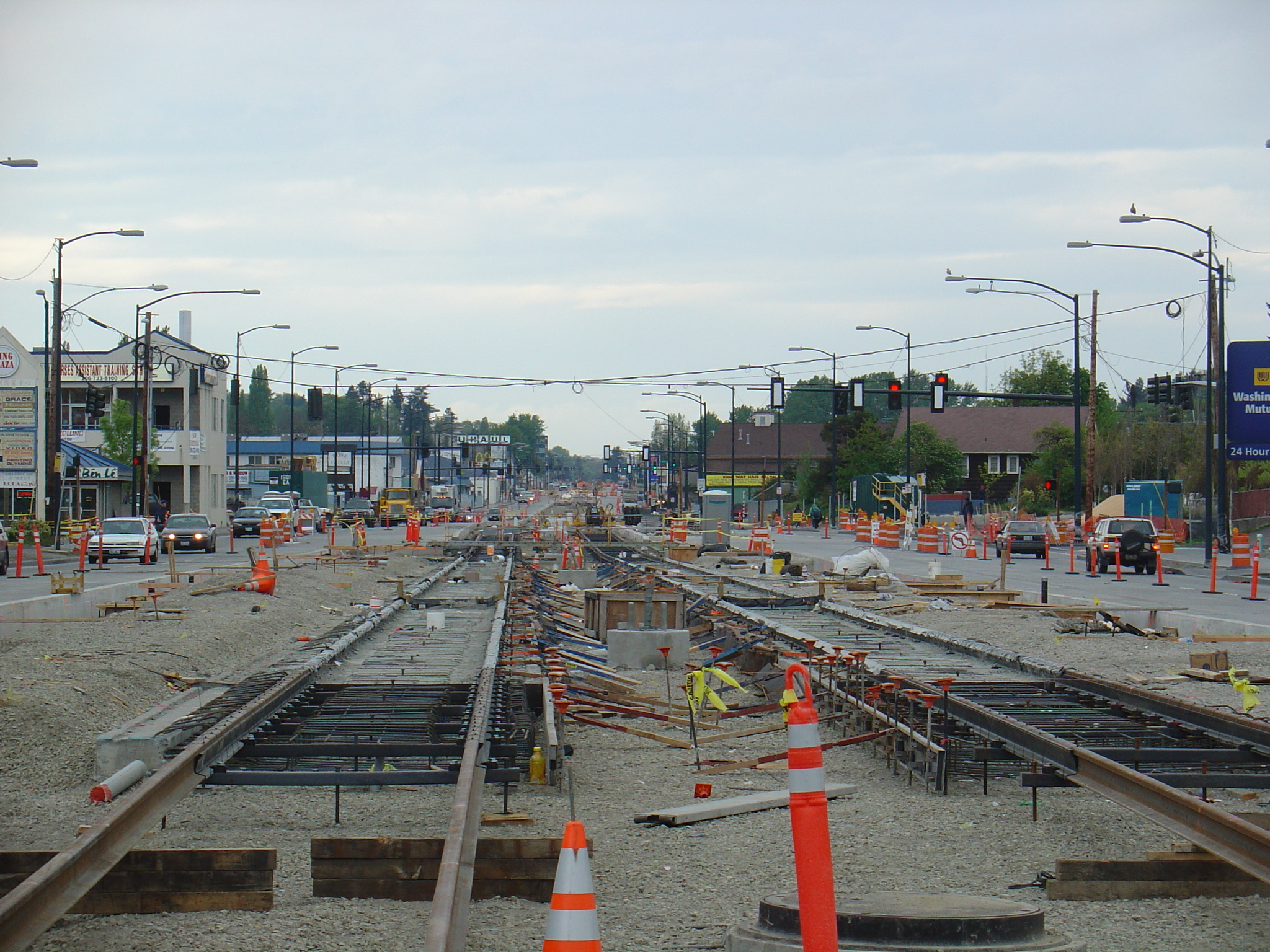
Construction of Central Link's surface section in the Rainier Valley area of southeastern Seattle, 2007

Planning and construction of Central Link, the light rail line that would travel through Downtown Seattle, was delayed several times due to increased costs and political scrutiny over its alignment. The preferred route, selected in November 1999, ran 24 miles (39 km) from Northgate Transit Center in Seattle to Seattle–Tacoma International Airport. It integrated with the downtown transit tunnel, required the construction of a new tunnel under Portage Bay and through Beacon Hill, and followed surface streets in the Rainier Valley area and Tukwila. It would cost $1.85 billion (equivalent to $3.36 billion in 2025 dollars) to construct the 21-mile (34 km) section from the University of Washington campus to the airport, which had been funded in the Sound Move plan. The cost had increased significantly from the original plan's budget due to unexpected property acquisitions that would be needed. The use of at-grade tracks in the Rainier Valley was opposed by a citizens' group, which filed a lawsuit against Sound Transit to add a tunnel to plans.

The 4.5-mile (7.2 km) northern tunnel, which would connect the University District to Downtown Seattle with intermediate stations on Capitol Hill and First Hill, was originally budgeted to cost $557 million (equivalent to $988 million in 2025 dollars). In November 2000, Sound Transit's selected contractor produced a low bid that was $171 million higher (equivalent to $303 million in 2025 dollars) than the budget. The poor soils around and under Portage Bay, along with other changes to the design, led to a $680 million increase (equivalent to $1.21 billion in 2025 dollars) in the estimated cost of the project, which drew criticism from local media and elected officials. The Federal Transit Administration (FTA) informed Sound Transit that major design changes would require a new funding agreement, which was ultimately signed in January 2001 but did not guarantee continued appropriations for the project. Congress ordered a financial audit of Sound Transit to be conducted by the inspector general of the U.S. Department of Transportation before further grant approval. A private audit commissioned by Sound Transit determined that the financial estimates had been "overly optimistic", lacked adequate contingencies, and were drawn from insufficient data. The inspector general's interim report criticized the FTA and Sound Transit for advancing in the grant review process without having a firm cost estimate, which had changed several times due to modifications to the preferred project. The new U.S. Transportation Secretary, Norman Mineta, announced a freeze on releasing funds from the federal earmark, but did not allow them to be redistributed until Sound Transit resubmitted its plans.

A shortened version of the Central Link project that would only run 14 miles (23 km) between Downtown Seattle and Tukwila was proposed as the initial operating segment for the network; it would cost $2.1 billion (equivalent to $3.64 billion in 2025 dollars) to construct under the revised budget estimates but would not reach Sea–Tac Airport. The revised plan, with a completion date set for 2009, was approved by the Sound Transit Board in September 2001 and formally adopted two months later by a 14–2 vote. The change in the project's scope from the original Sound Move plan was challenged in a lawsuit filed in February 2002 by an opposition group funded by real estate developer Kemper Freeman; a county court ruled in favor of Sound Transit and the decision was later upheld by the State Supreme Court. A new grant application for the project's federal funding was submitted in July 2002 and final design began the following month with the FTA's approval. The inspector general's second investigation of Sound Transit took ten months and was completed in July 2003; the report concluded that the agency had resolved its financial auditing issues and outstanding questions about rail–bus interoperability in the Downtown Seattle Transit Tunnel, among other issues. The full federal grant agreement was reinstated in October 2003 and construction of Central Link began a month later.

On November 8, 2003, a groundbreaking ceremony was held for the Central Link project at the site of the future operations and maintenance facility in Seattle's SoDo neighborhood. Work on all project contracts for the initial segment was underway by the following year. The first rails for the line were installed in SoDo in August 2005 and followed a month later by the start of a two-year renovation project for the Downtown Seattle Transit Tunnel, which would need a lowered roadbed to support simultaneous bus and train operations. Testing on the first completed section, in SoDo, began in March 2007 and was extended into the downtown transit tunnel when it reopened in September. Central Link began service on July 18, 2009, and drew 92,000 total passengers during its first weekend with trains operating from Westlake station in Downtown Seattle to Tukwila International Boulevard station. The total construction cost was $2.44 billion (equivalent to $3.55 billion in 2025 dollars), which was $117 million (equivalent to $170 million in 2025 dollars) below the budget set in 2003.

=== Expansion packages and openings ===
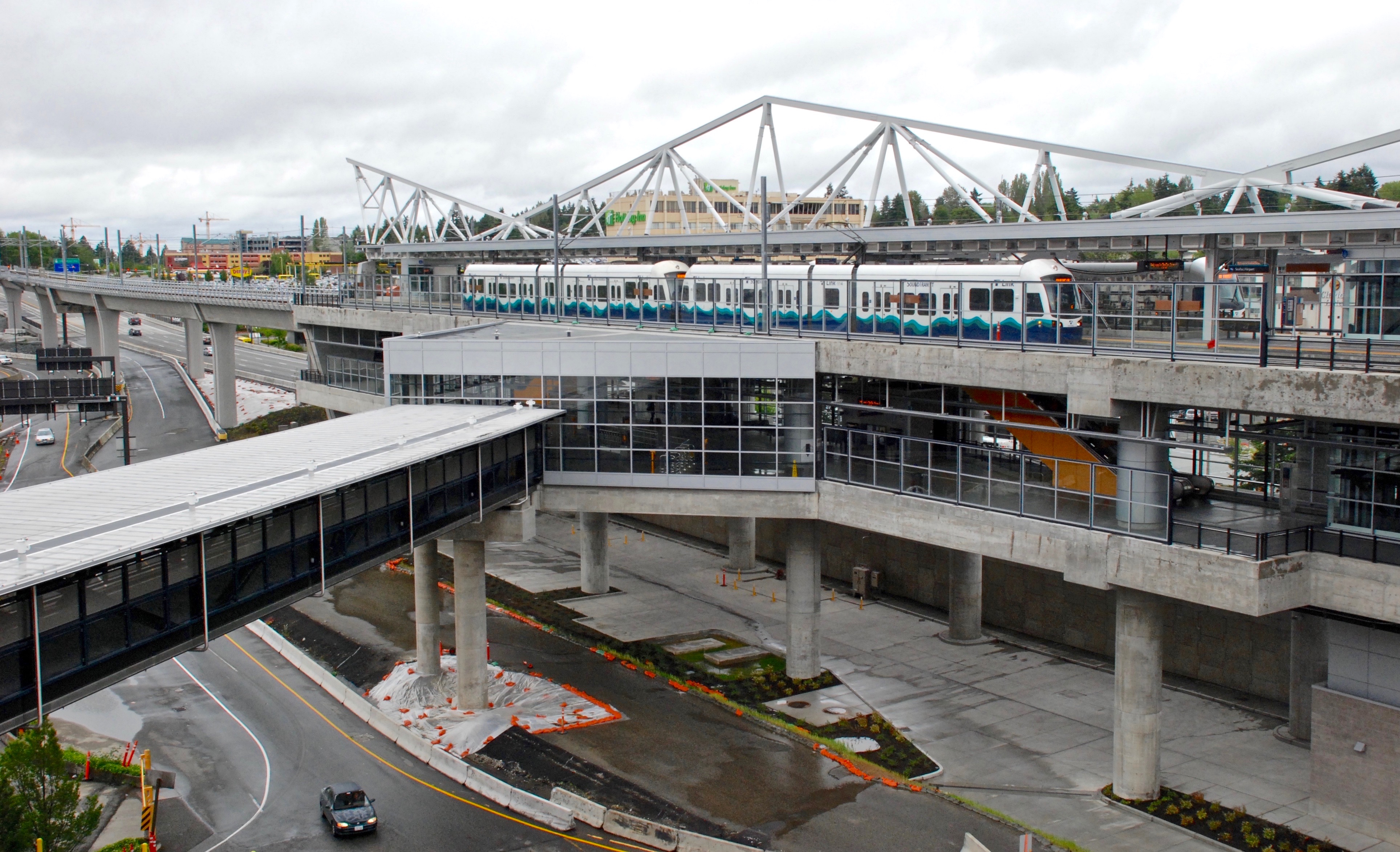
SeaTac/Airport station, opened in December 2009

Central Link was extended 1.7 miles (2.7 km) to SeaTac/Airport station on December 19, 2009, following three years of construction and an agreement with the Port of Seattle, the airport's operators. The airport station had been excluded from the initial segment due to financial concerns and changes to the Port of Seattle's plans for an integrated terminal caused by the September 11 attacks in 2001. A new agreement between Sound Transit and the Port was signed in 2004 and a total of $244 million (equivalent to $355 million in 2025 dollars) in bonds were issued to finance the project without requiring a new expansion package.

The line's first northern extension, to Capitol Hill and the University of Washington campus, was also financed through existing revenue sources approved under the Sound Move ballot measure. The FTA approved preliminary plans for the tunneled project, named University Link, in 2006 and awarded $813 million (equivalent to $1.19 billion in 2025 dollars) in federal grants. Construction on the 3.15-mile (5.07 km) tunnel began in March 2009 and utilized a trio of tunnel-boring machines that traveled under Capitol Hill and the Lake Washington Ship Canal. The tunnel and its two stations opened on March 19, 2016, amid large community celebrations; they were completed six months ahead of the approved schedule, and cost less than their $1.9 billion budget (equivalent to $2.49 billion in 2025 dollars). Daily ridership on Central Link increased from 39,000 passengers prior to the extension's opening to 65,000 by February 2017.

Sound Transit prepared to extend Link up to 49 miles (79 km) further into the Seattle suburbs in their second regional transit plan, named Sound Transit 2 (ST2), which was adopted by their board of directors in May 2007. The 20-year program was part of the Roads and Transit ballot measure, which included proposed highway and road projects at the behest of the state legislature. After the joint ballot measure was rejected by 56 percent in November 2007, a standalone and modified ST2 package was approved by 57 percent of voters in November 2008. The approved version comprised a 15-year program with 34 miles (55 km) of light rail extensions that was planned to reach Lynnwood, the Microsoft campus in Redmond, and northern Federal Way by 2023. The Great Recession was anticipated to decrease tax revenue needed to fund ST2, particularly from southern King County, and would leave insufficient funding for some projects. In response to the projected loss of funding, Sound Transit scaled back its extensions to Federal Way and Redmond, removing the construction budget for their final sections, and deferred several other projects.

The first infill station on the system was opened at Commerce Street and South 11th Street on Tacoma Link in September 2011 after a year of planning and construction. The first rail project funded by ST2 was the First Hill Streetcar, a 2.5-mile (4.0 km) line in the modern Seattle Streetcar system that opened in January 2016. It was intended to replace an underground Link station planned for First Hill that was cancelled in 2005 due to anticipated costs and risks. Central Link service was extended south from the airport to Angle Lake station on September 24, 2016, using 1.6 miles (2.6 km) of elevated tracks to reach a new park-and-ride facility. It was Sound Transit's first design–build project and was split from the rest of the Federal Way extension to open four years early. Angle Lake station was one of the final sections of Central Link from the original Sound Move plan to be constructed; a 2016 analysis by The Seattle Times estimated that the line cost a total of $3.10 billion in 1995 dollars (equivalent to $5.97 billion in 2025 dollars) to construct—approximately 86 percent over its budget in the 1996 ballot measure.

A third major expansion package, named Sound Transit 3 (ST3), was approved by 54 percent of voters in the Sound Transit district on November 8, 2016. It encompassed $54 billion in planned transit improvements, including the addition of 62 miles (100 km) to the Link light rail system to be completed by 2041. The Link expansion comprised suburban extensions north from Lynnwood to Everett; south from Federal Way to Tacoma; and between Kirkland and Issaquah on the Eastside. The program also included two major projects in Seattle: an extension north to Ballard via South Lake Union; and to West Seattle. The light rail components of the plan were expected to cost approximately $31.7 billion in year-of-expenditure dollars over the 25-year lifespan of the program.

=== Northgate and suburban extensions ===
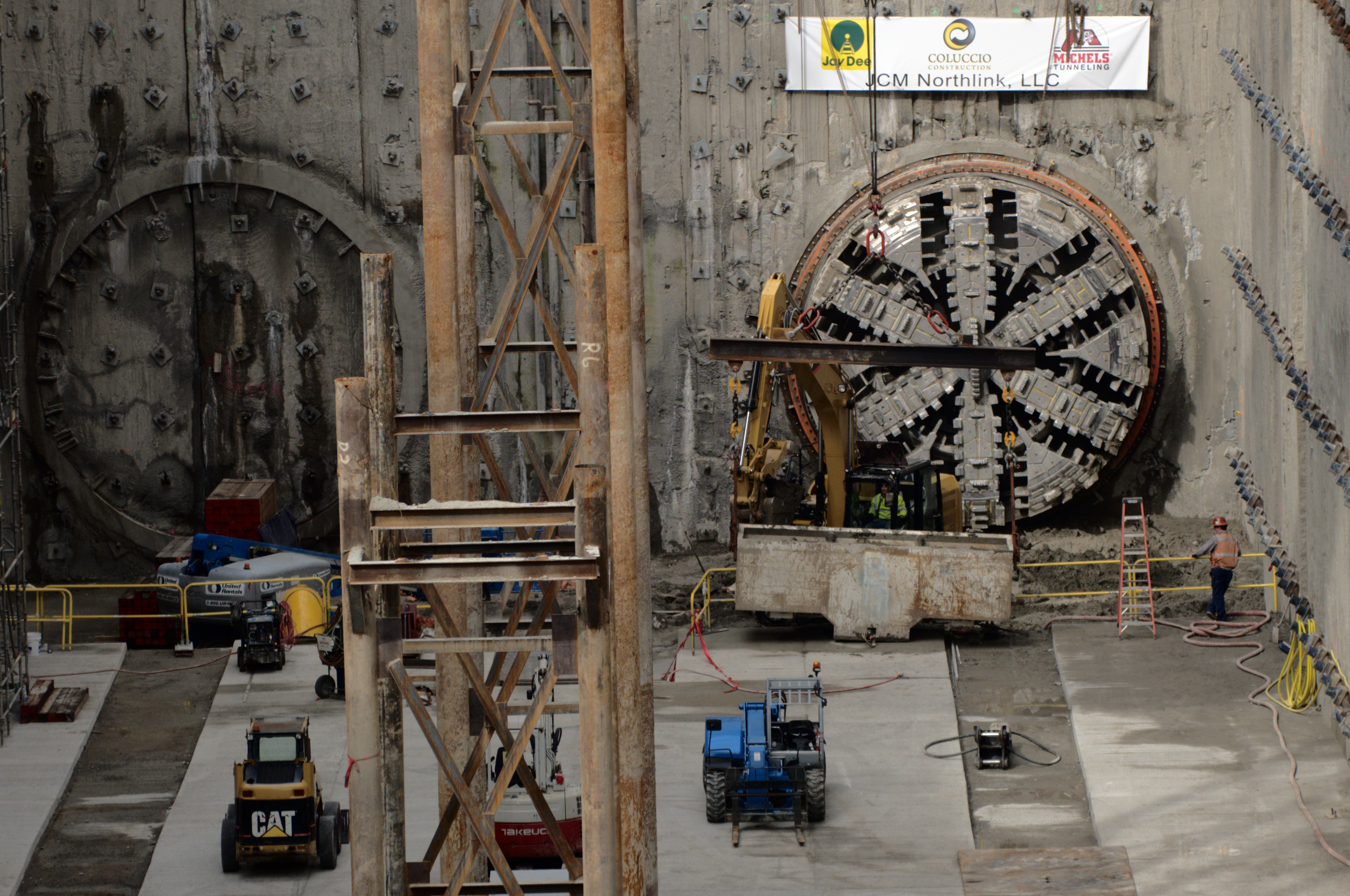
Construction of the Northgate Link tunnel at Roosevelt station in 2015

Construction of the next Link extension funded by ST2, traveling north by 4.3 miles (6.9 km) from the University of Washington campus to Northgate station with two intermediate stations, began in August 2012. The Northgate Link tunnel spans 3.4 miles (5.5 km) and includes slab tracks that are intended to limit vibrations under the university's laboratories; Sound Transit also financed the relocation of laboratories in four buildings that would experience some level of electromagnetic interference that could affect experiments. The Northgate extension opened on October 2, 2021, at a cost of $1.9 billion (equivalent to $2.22 billion in 2025 dollars). It was completed during the COVID-19 pandemic, which caused ridership to decline to 22,000 daily passengers by May 2021; frequency on Central Link (soon to become the 1 Line) was cut to 12 minutes due to a lack of available train operators. After the Northgate extension opened, ridership on the 1 Line increased to nearly its pre-pandemic levels in 2022 and exceeded it in the following years. A 2.4-mile (3.9 km) extension of the T Line to Tacoma's Stadium District and Hilltop neighborhoods with seven stations opened on September 16, 2023. It took five years to construct at a cost of $282 million (equivalent to $297 million in 2025 dollars)—both exceeding the original project estimates.

ST2 also funded the East Link Extension, planned to span 14 miles (23 km) from Seattle to Bellevue and Redmond via a crossing of Lake Washington. The Homer M. Hadley Memorial Bridge, a floating bridge that carries part of Interstate 90 from Seattle to Mercer Island, was opened in 1989 and had been designed with future conversion of its reversible express lanes to transit use. A live load test on the bridge to simulate the weight of light rail trains was conducted by the Washington State Department of Transportation in 2005; it found that trains would be safe to operate on the bridge once minor modifications were made and would not compromise its longevity. The routing of East Link through Bellevue took four years to negotiate between Sound Transit and the Bellevue City Council, who agreed in 2013 to provide additional funding to construct a short tunnel in Downtown Bellevue. Construction on East Link began shortly before its formal groundbreaking in April 2016 with a total budget set at $3.7 billion (equivalent to $4.86 billion in 2025 dollars) and completion planned for 2023. The Seattle–Mercer Island express lanes were closed to traffic in June 2017 and replaced by a set of high-occupancy vehicle lanes (HOV lanes) on the outer lanes of Interstate 90.

Excavation of the Bellevue tunnel, constructed through sequential excavation, was completed in July 2018 and the East Link project reached a halfway milestone in April 2019. Later that year, construction began on a 3.7-mile (6.0 km) extension from East Link's planned terminus at Redmond Technology station to Downtown Redmond. ST2 had funded engineering and design work for the project, while the remaining $1.53 billion (equivalent to $1.9 billion in 2025 dollars) in construction funds were not approved until ST3 was passed in 2016. The Seattle–Mercer Island section, including the floating bridge, suffered from quality control issues during construction that necessitated the full replacement of 5,455 concrete plinths under the tracks as well as new bolt inserts in the fasteners. Sound Transit, at the request of Eastside elected officials, approved a six-mile (9.7 km) "starter line" that would operate on the completed East Link (now 2 Line) tracks between South Bellevue and Redmond Technology stations with a reduced schedule. It opened on April 27, 2024, to serve Bellevue and Overlake commuters; the extension to Downtown Redmond opened on May 10, 2025. Service between Downtown Seattle and South Bellevue began on March 28, 2026, with the opening of two more stations.

The first inter-county extension, the 8.5-mile (13.7 km) Lynnwood Link Extension from Northgate to Lynnwood in Snohomish County, opened on August 30, 2024. The project was approved as part of ST2 and had its route along Interstate 5 chosen in 2011 ahead of an alternative that used State Route 99. The cost of the project was $3.1 billion—of which $1.2 billion was financed by a federal grant. The extension's four stations—located in Shoreline, Mountlake Terrace, and Lynnwood—include large parking garages and areas with zoning to support transit-oriented development. Daily ridership on the 1 Line increased to 90,000 on weekdays in November 2024 as a result of the extension's opening. The southern extension to Federal Way, spanning 7.8 miles (12.6 km) from Angle Lake station to Federal Way Downtown station, opened on December 6, 2025. It includes three stations near Interstate 5 and was approved in ST3 after its initial round of ST2 funding was eliminated by cuts during the Great Recession. The design–build project began construction in 2020, but was delayed following the discovery of poor soil conditions on a section that had to be replaced with a cantilever bridge. An infill station in northern Seattle, named Pinehurst, was funded by ST3 and opened on September 30, 2026.

== Lines ==
A geographic map of the Link light rail system with the three active lines: the 1 Line in green, the 2 Line in blue, and the T Line in orange.

Link line icons
The Link line icons and colors announced by Sound Transit in 2020

The alphanumeric naming system for Link lines took effect in October 2021 alongside the opening of the Northgate Link Extension. Each line uses a number, represented by Arabic numerals, as the primary identifier and a colored bullet as the secondary identifier. Sound Transit had initially announced the use of color names for the lines in September 2019, assigning the "Red Line" for Central Link, the "Orange Line" for Tacoma Link, and the "Blue Line" for East Link when it opened. Two months later, the agency announced that it would not use the "Red Line" moniker in response to criticism that it was too similar to redlining, a housing discrimination practice that was once prevalent in the Rainier Valley. The alphanumeric names were announced in April 2020 and would be used in conjunction with the Sounder lines and future Stride bus routes. The 1 Line (colored green) replaced Central Link, while the 2 Line (blue) was assigned to East Link and the T Line (orange) replaced Tacoma Link; future lines would be named the 3 Line (magenta) and 4 Line (purple). The use of other color names was avoided because they carry various associations, would require more complex names, or would be confused with the Swift Bus Rapid Transit system in Snohomish County; the use of letters was found to conflict with King County Metro's existing RapidRide system and was retained solely for Sounder.

=== 1 Line (Lynnwood–Federal Way) ===
The 1 Line, formerly Central Link, is a light rail line that serves 27 stations in Lynnwood, Mountlake Terrace, Shoreline, Seattle, Tukwila, SeaTac, Kent, and Federal Way. It uses trains of three to four cars that each have a normal capacity of 194 passengers with up to 74 seats. The line is mostly grade-separated and uses a mix of tunnels, elevated guideways, and surface-running sections. Trains run every 8 minutes during peak periods and 10–15 minutes at other times. The 1 Line carried 35.6 million passengers and averaged over 102,000 on weekdays in 2025, making it the busiest route in the Sound Transit system.

The initial 13.9-mile (22.4 km) segment of Central Link was opened on July 18, 2009, between Westlake and Tukwila International Boulevard stations. The northernmost four stations, in the Downtown Seattle Transit Tunnel, were shared with bus routes that were moved to surface streets in 2019. An extension south to the airport opened in December 2009 and was followed by additional extensions to the University of Washington campus in March 2016, to Angle Lake station in September 2016, and to Northgate in November 2021. The first cross-county extension, through Shoreline and Mountlake Terrace to Lynnwood, opened on August 30, 2024, and brought the line to over 33 miles (53 km). An extension into South King County opened on December 6, 2025, bringing the line to 41 miles (66 km)—the second-longest light rail line in the United States after the A Line in Los Angeles.

=== 2 Line (Lynnwood–Redmond) ===
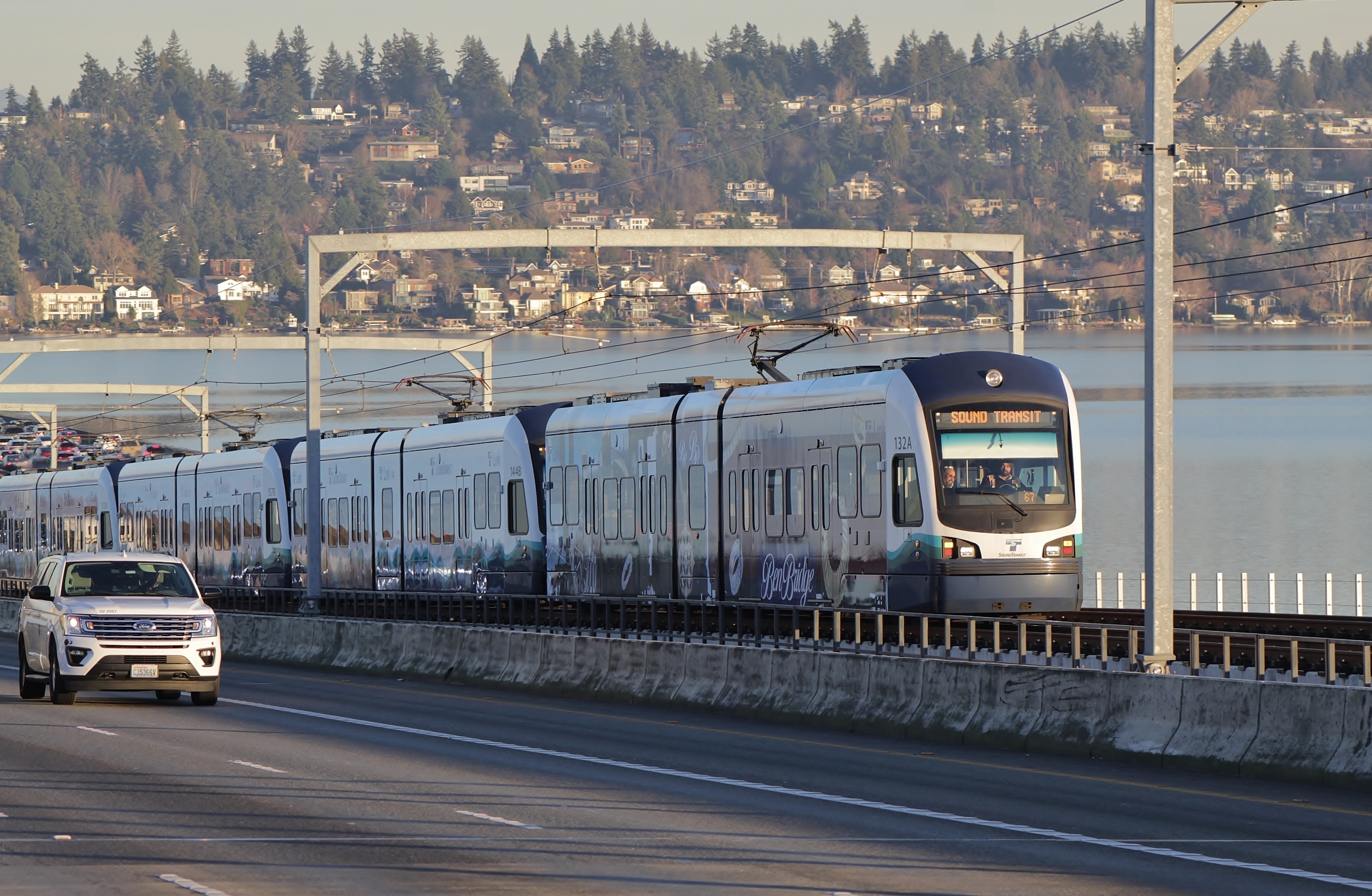
A test train crossing Lake Washington on the Homer M. Hadley Memorial Bridge, a permanent floating bridge on the 2 Line

The 2 Line connects the Eastside suburbs of Bellevue and Redmond. It serves 33 miles (53 km) including the Lynnwood–Seattle section that is shared with the 1 Line; the 2 Line has 18 miles (29 km) of track that it does not share with the 1 Line. The line has 26 stations, of which 14 are shared with the 1 Line, with termini at Lynnwood City Center station and Downtown Redmond station. The line uses three-car trainsets during peak periods and two-car trains at other times, with the ability to use four-car trains when needed. The 2 Line carried 2 million total passengers in 2025 and averaged 6,511 on weekdays. The section from Seattle to Mercer Island was built in the median of Interstate 90, including the first light railway on a floating bridge in the world.

Construction of the line, also known as the East Link Extension, was funded by the Sound Transit 2 ballot measure and began in 2016 at a cost of $3.7 billion. The initial phase on the Eastside opened on April 27, 2024 from Bellevue to Redmond Technology station, and an extension to Downtown Redmond opened May 10, 2025. A separate section between Lynnwood City Center and International District/Chinatown was opened to passengers on February 14, 2026, as part of simulated service testing for the entire line. The remainder of the 2 Line over the Homer M. Hadley Memorial Bridge opened on March 28, 2026, with additional stations in Seattle and Mercer Island.

=== T Line (Tacoma Dome–St. Joseph) ===
The T Line, formerly Tacoma Link, is a streetcar line that connects Downtown Tacoma, Hilltop, and nearby neighborhoods to Tacoma Dome Station, a regional hub for buses and Sounder commuter rail. The line is 4 miles (6.4 km) long and has twelve stations that serve the University of Washington's Tacoma campus, museums, hospitals, and other facilities. It runs primarily in mixed traffic, sharing the Commerce Street transit mall with buses, and uses a mix of single and double-tracked sections. Service on the original 1.6-mile (2.6 km) section between Tacoma Dome Station and Downtown Tacoma began on August 26, 2003, and was expanded with the opening of an infill station at Commerce Street/South 11th Street in 2011. An extension to the Hilltop neighborhood with 2.4 miles (3.9 km) of track and seven new stations opened on September 16, 2023.

Trains on the line typically run every 12 minutes on weekdays and Saturdays and every 20 minutes on Sundays and holidays. The T Line has service from 4:30 a.m. to 10:00 p.m. on weekdays and reduced hours on other days, but operating hours are extended for major evening events at the Tacoma Dome. The line carried approximately 987,000 total passengers in 2025 and averaged 3,907 riders on weekdays. Patronage peaked in 2012 at over 1 million passengers, but has declined since then. Fares were not collected until the 2023 opening of the Hilltop Extension. The T Line was the first Link line to use a flat fare rather than a distance-based fare.

== Stations ==
As of 2026, the Link light rail system has 51 stations: 27 are served by the 1 Line, 26 by the 2 Line, and 12 by the T Line. A total of 14 stations between Lynnwood City Center and International District/Chinatown are shared by the 1 Line and 2 Line. All stations have weather canopies, signage, information kiosks, ticket vending machines, seating, electronic information displays, bicycle parking, and public artwork. Link, like many other light rail systems in the United States, uses proof-of-payment for fare validation with marked paid fare zones instead of turnstiles. All stations have accessible features—including seating, signage with Braille lettering, pathways, level boarding, and tactile paving on the edge of platforms—and comply with requirements from the federal Americans with Disabilities Act of 1990 (ADA).

Platforms for all lines have a minimum width of 12 feet (3.7 m) each for a pair of side platforms and 20 feet (6.1 m) for an at-grade center platform. The majority of stations on the 1 Line and 2 Line are grade-separated, either underground or elevated, on exclusive right-of-way. These stations have platforms that are 380 feet (120 m) long to accommodate four-car trainsets and are connected to entrance structures at street level by stairs, elevators, and escalators. The Downtown Seattle Transit Tunnel comprises four stations that were built in the late 1980s by King County Metro and were jointly used with buses until 2019; their escalators and elevators are scheduled to be replaced by Sound Transit in the 2020s after several years of unplanned outages. Several sections of the 1 Line and 2 Line have at-grade stations, primarily in the Rainier Valley and SODO. T Line platforms are typically 90 feet (27 m) long and at-grade with exits to adjacent sidewalks. Some stations also feature public restrooms, retail spaces, and designated busking areas.

Connections to other transit systems, including Sound Transit Express and local buses, are available at all Link stations; some are designated as transit centers with designs to accommodate a large number of buses, such as Lynnwood City Center station. The regional Sounder commuter rail system and intercity Amtrak trains connect to Link at International District/Chinatown station in Seattle and Tacoma Dome Station on the T Line. The Seattle Center Monorail and South Lake Union Streetcar connect at Westlake; the First Hill Streetcar runs between Capitol Hill and International District/Chinatown stations; and Colman Dock, the Seattle hub for Washington State Ferries and local ferries, is accessed from Pioneer Square. Many suburban stations also have park-and-ride lots that provide up to 24 hours of free parking for transit users; as of 2026, there are 14 stations with park-and-ride facilities and a combined 13,180 stalls. Since 2026, up to 25 percent of stalls at park-and-ride facilities with high use are reserved through a permit reservation program that charges $6 per day or $60 per month for single-occupant vehicles and is free for vehicles with two or more occupants. A daily charge for parking at up to 15 of Link's stations is planned to be implemented in 2027 to manage high levels of demand and recover construction costs. Sound Transit also provides bicycle lockers at most Link stations that can be rented for an hourly or daily rate.

All Link stations are named in accordance with Sound Transit policies that are associated with the surrounding neighborhood or nearby streets and landmarks. Stations on the 1 Line and 2 Line are also identified by three-digit station codes that were implemented with the opening of the Lynnwood extension in August 2024. The codes have two-digit numbers that increase from south to north for individual stations, with the central point of Westlake station designated as "50". When combined with the line number, it becomes a three-digit code. The station codes replaced an earlier pictogram system that used symbols associated with nearby neighborhoods or landmarks for each station. It was designed to comply with a state law that required additional identifiers for transit stations to assist passengers with limited English proficiency or difficulties with reading the Latin alphabet.

Examples of Link light rail stations

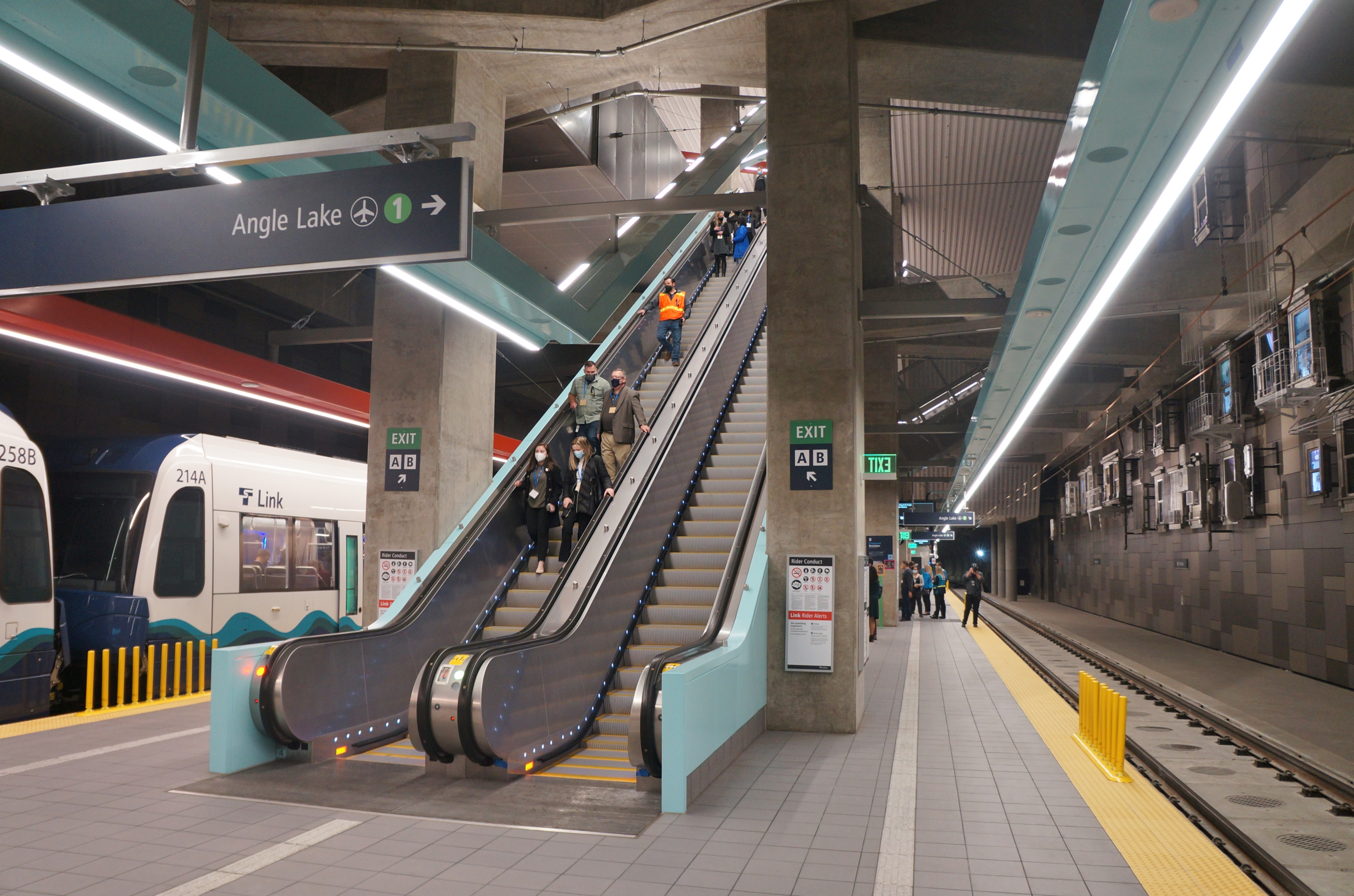
U District, an underground station on the 1 Line

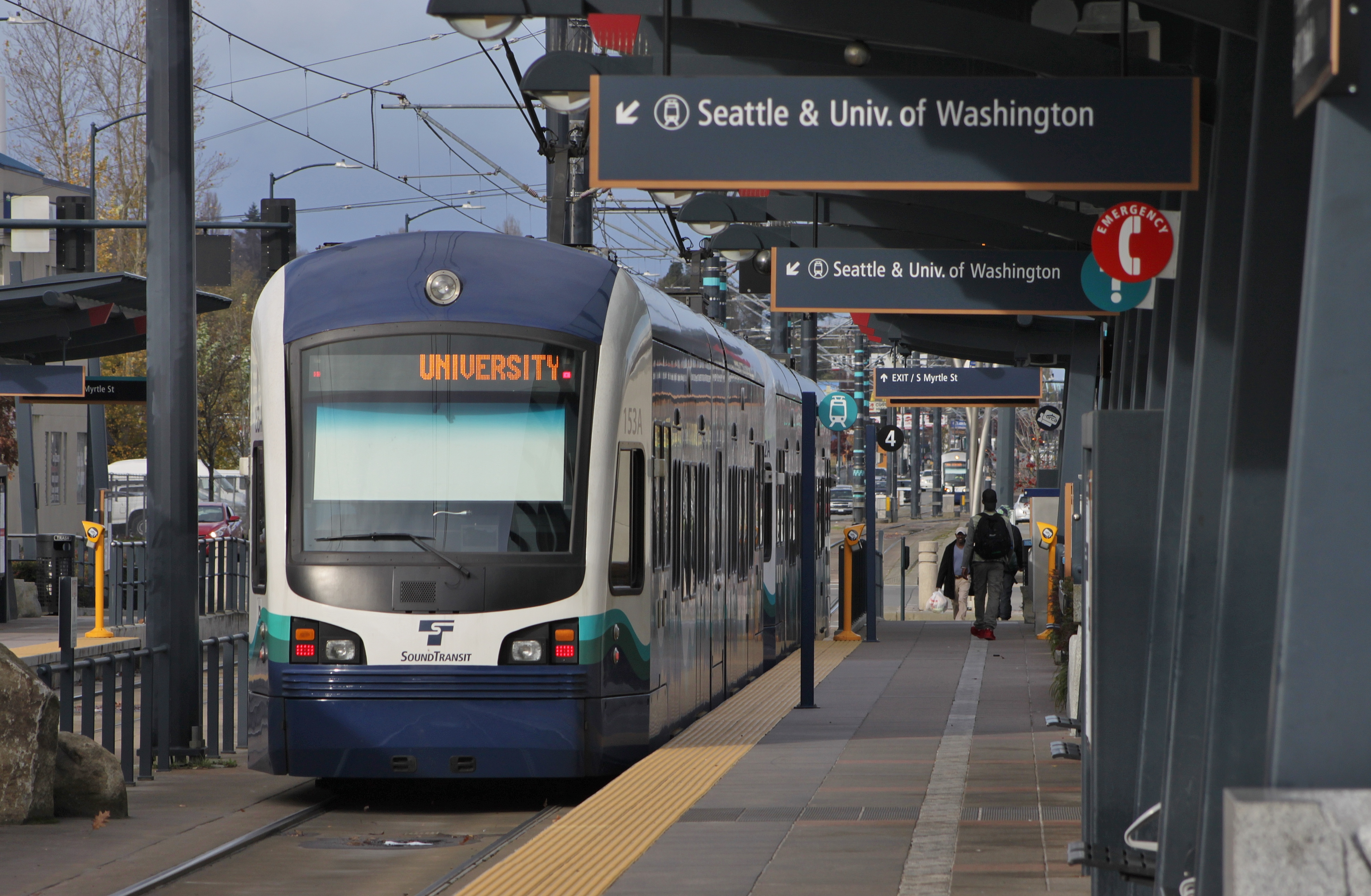
Othello, a surface station on the 1 Line

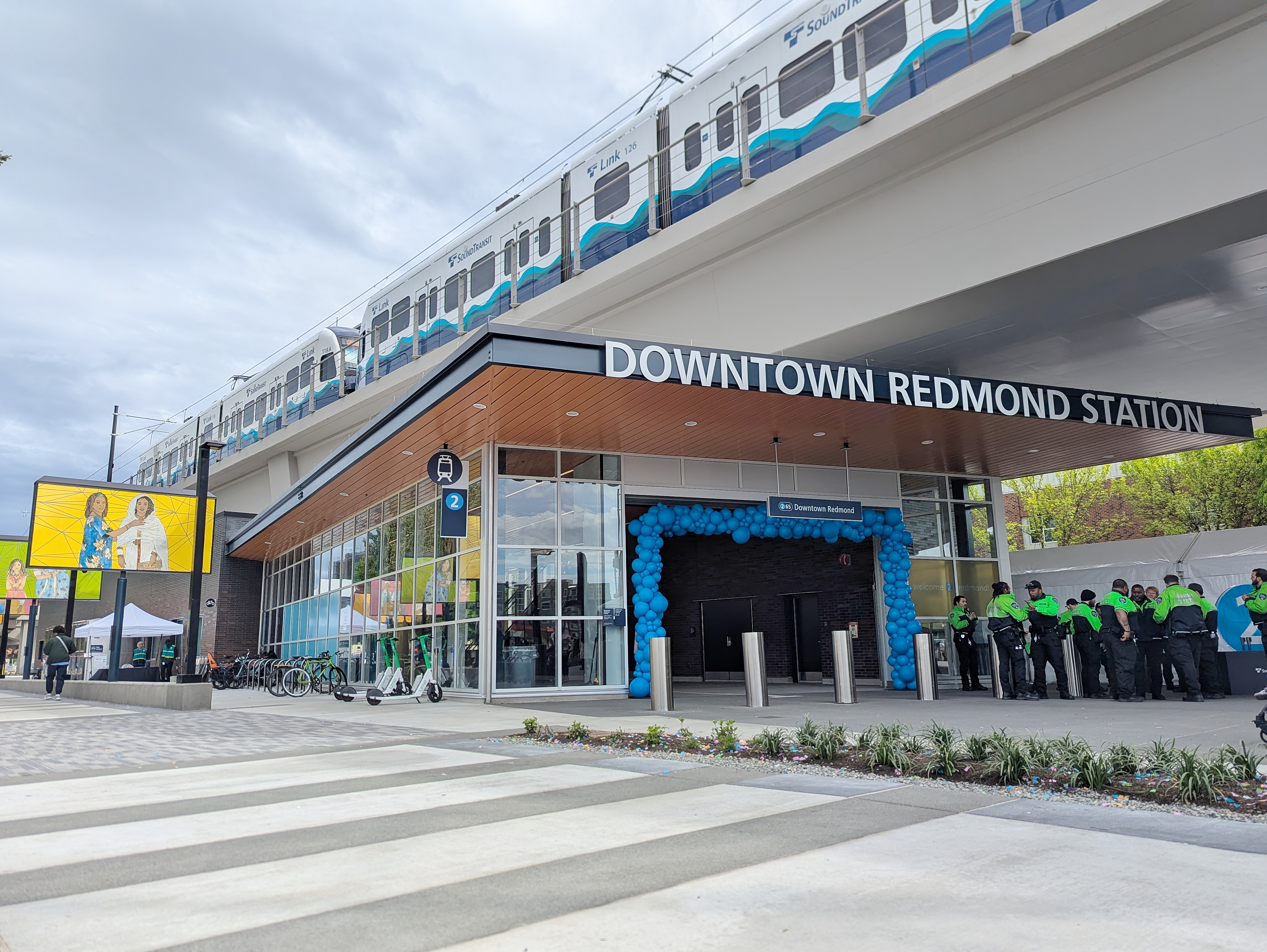
Downtown Redmond, an elevated station on the 2 Line

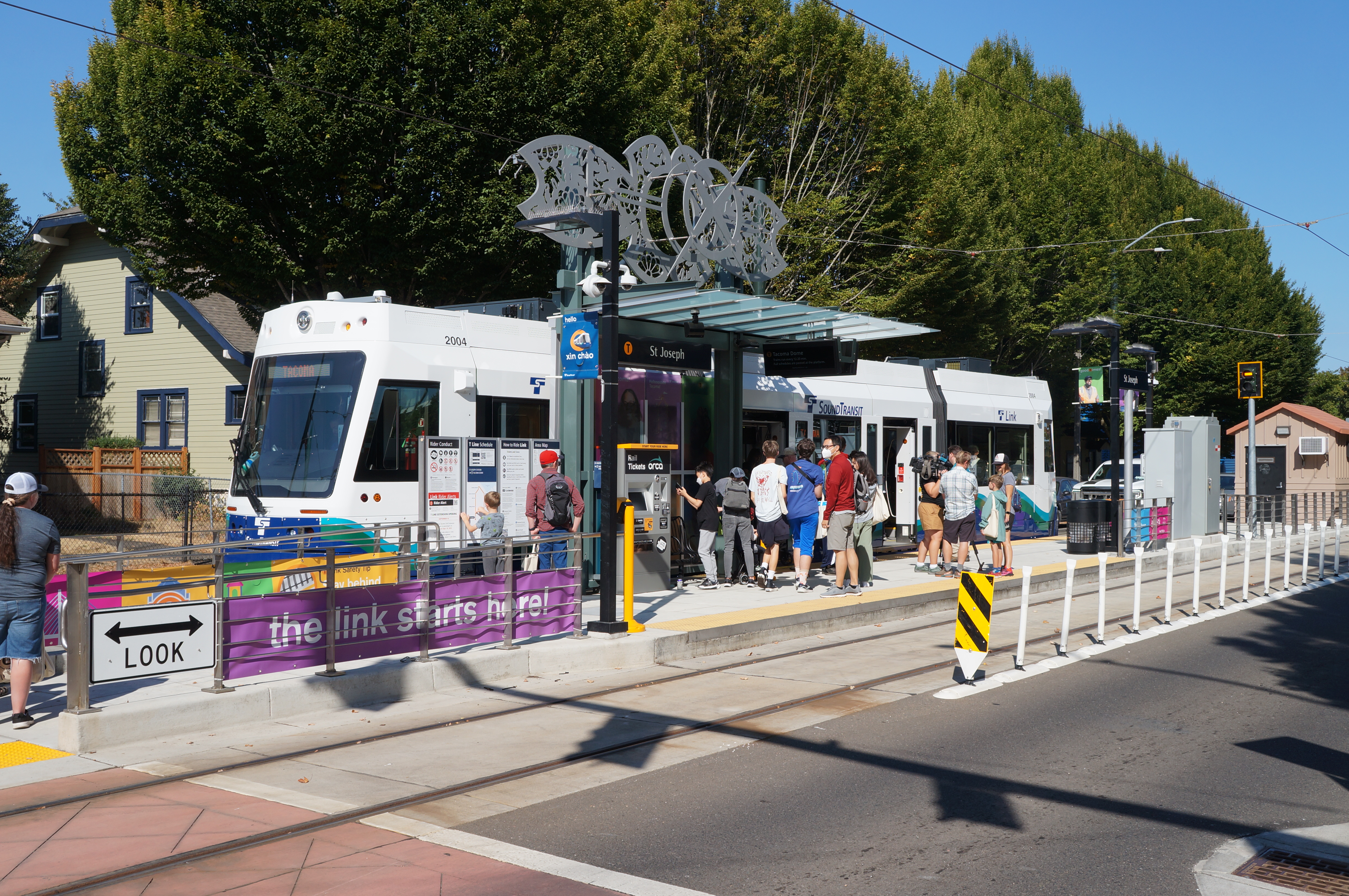
St. Joseph, a surface station on the T Line

=== Public art ===
Link stations and facilities are furnished with pieces of public artwork as part of STart, a Sound Transit program that allocates one percent of the capital budget for art. The collection includes 30 older pieces from the Downtown Seattle Transit Tunnel stations, completed in 1990 by King County Metro, and newer pieces designed to be integrated within the architecture of stations. The original section of Central Link in Seattle and Tukwila comprised pieces from 40 artists under the direction of Norie Sato, who also designed tiles with braided patterns installed at every station. Several pieces were installed at non-station facilities, including Sound of Light by Richard C. Elliott, a set of 37 reflective mosaic panels on a retaining wall that was recognized with an award from Americans for the Arts. Among the largest art installations at Link stations are Jet Kiss, a pair of A-4 Skyhawk attack aircraft suspended above the platform at Capitol Hill station; Building Blocks, a 49-foot (15 m) sculpture in the plaza of Roosevelt station; and Fragment Brooklyn, a series of windows and building exteriors with integrated video screens at U District station.

=== Transit-oriented development ===
Sound Transit and local governments have promoted the use of transit-oriented development (TOD) and smart growth to increase the density of housing and jobs around existing and future Link stations. Land zoning around stations is typically changed to allow for multi-family housing rather than being limited to single-family housing, especially in suburban municipalities. Approximately 10,000 housing units are planned to be constructed around four stations on the Lynnwood Link Extension, which opened in 2024 in the northern suburbs of Seattle. The launch of the 2 Line spurred plans to add thousands of housing units around stations in the Eastside cities of Bellevue and Redmond. The Spring District, a 36-acre (15 ha) mixed-use neighborhood in Bellevue, began construction in 2013 and has 800 housing units and offices for several companies. Near Downtown Redmond station, over 5,000 new apartments had been constructed before the station opened in 2025; an additional 4,000 units are planned or in the permitting phase.

Environmentalists, transportation groups, and affordable housing advocates have also sought regulatory support for transit-oriented development at Link stations from the state government. A 2009 bill in the state legislature proposed raising allowable densities to a minimum of 50 units per acre in station areas, along with relaxed parking minimums. It failed to pass during the 2009 and 2010 sessions amid opposition from neighborhood groups. A separate program for Sound Transit properties, later named the "80–80–80 rule", was passed by the state legislature as part of the enabling legislation for Sound Transit 3 in 2016. It mandates that 80 percent of reserve and surplus land surrounding light rail stations be offered to developers who designate 80 percent of residential units to residents who make 80 percent or less of the area median income. By early 2025, Sound Transit's TOD programs had resulted in the construction of 1,599 completed units of affordable housing around Link stations.

== Service ==
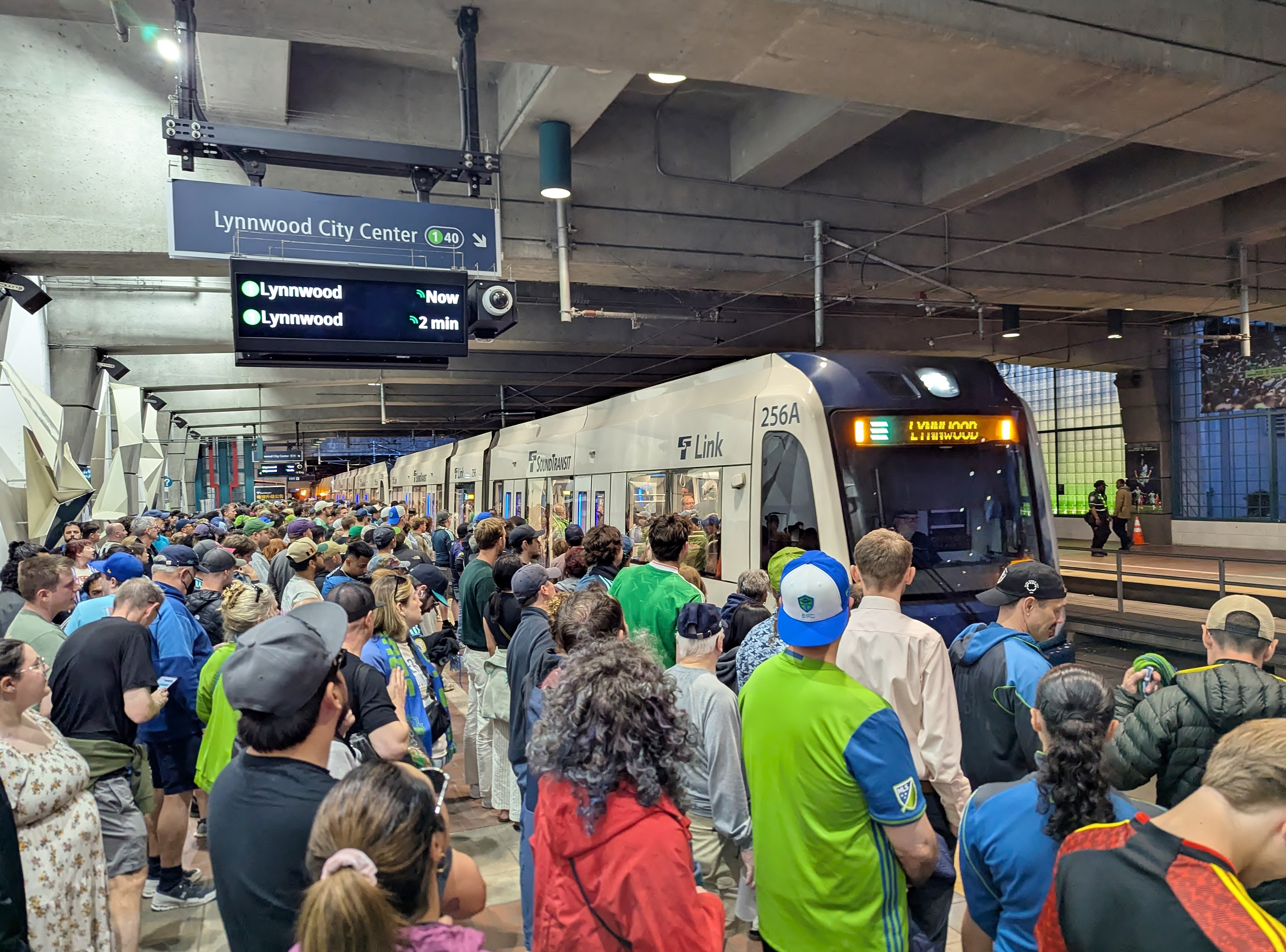
The northbound platform at International District/Chinatown station after a Seattle Sounders FC match

Link runs year-round with service that varies between its three lines. On weekdays, the 1 Line and 2 Line operate every 8 minutes during peak periods in the morning and afternoon and every 10 minutes during the middle of the day; service gradually becomes less frequent in the evening, with the final trains running every 15 minutes until 1:00 a.m. On weekends, trains typically run every 10 minutes. The shared section between Lynnwood and Seattle has combined frequencies of four minutes during peak periods and five minutes for most of the day. The T Line has trains every 12 minutes from Monday to Saturday and every 20 minutes on Sundays and holidays; the final trains are typically at 10:00 p.m. from Monday to Saturday and at 6:00 p.m. on Sundays and holidays. Service on the 2 Line and T Line is extended on evenings with events at Marymoor Park and the Tacoma Dome, respectively. Additional trains are also deployed on the 1 Line after major events to increase capacity and reduce crowding. Link stations are equipped with passenger information signs that display real-time arrival information and service alerts.

=== Ridership ===
All three Link lines carried a combined 39,095,611 passengers in 2025 and averaged 90,050 riders on weekdays in 2024. The 1 Line carried approximately 91.3 percent of the system's total annual ridership, with nearly 35 million passengers; it was followed by the 2 Line at 2.2 million riders (5.7%) and the T Line with over 1.1 million riders (3%). The busiest Link station was Westlake in Downtown Seattle, which served approximately 4.3 million total passengers in 2025, or an average of 12,483 per weekday. According to the American Public Transportation Association's annual statistics, Link had the fourth-highest passenger count of any light rail system in the United States, behind Los Angeles Metro Rail, the San Diego Trolley, and the Green Line in Boston. Ridership on Link has increased since 2016 with the opening of new stations and extensions and reached over 30 million passengers by 2024. The system reached 155,000 daily boardings in April 2026—the most of any light rail system in the United States.

Ridership is measured by automatic passenger counters, an on-board infrared device that automatically records the number of people entering and leaving the train. The data from the trains is then calculated to determine ridership; as of 2025, approximately 32 percent of Series 1 vehicles have automatic passenger counters, while all Series 2 and T Line vehicles were installed with them. Link's one-day ridership of 313,000 passengers was set on July 6, 2026, during a 2026 FIFA World Cup match between the United States and Belgium. Outside of the World Cup, the system's record was set on March 28, 2026, the opening day of the Crosslake Connection on the 2 Line, with 252,000 boardings.

Highest single-day ridership totals
Date	Passengers	Event
July 6, 2026	313,000	2026 FIFA World Cup: United States vs. Belgium
June 19, 2026	292,000	2026 FIFA World Cup: United States vs. Australia
March 28, 2026	252,000	2 Line Crosslake Connection opening
July 1, 2026	246,000	2026 FIFA World Cup: Belgium vs. Senegal
June 24, 2026	237,000	2026 FIFA World Cup: Bosnia and Herzegovina vs. Qatar
June 26, 2026	234,000	2026 FIFA World Cup: Egypt vs. Iran

=== Fares ===
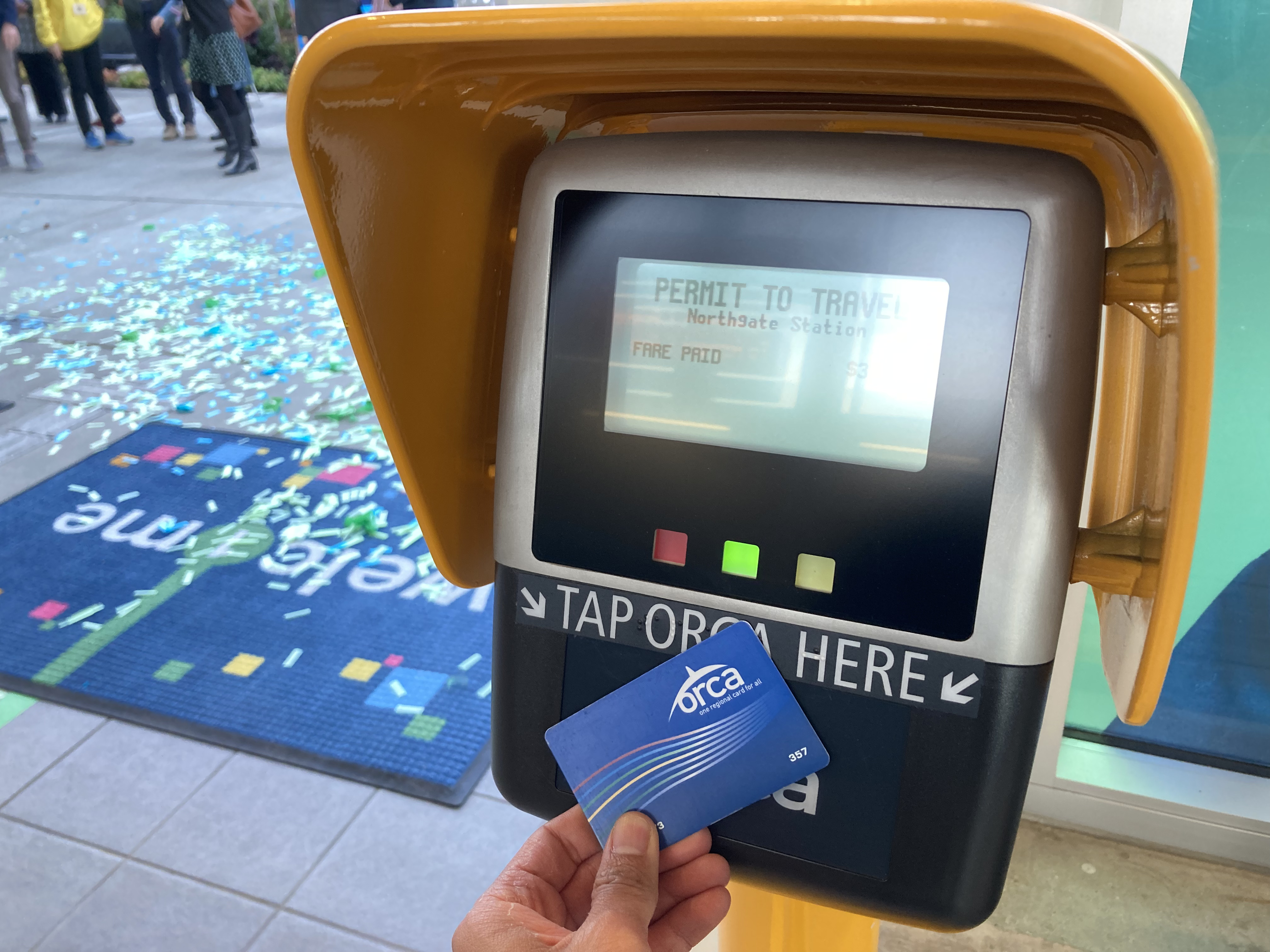
A first-generation ORCA card reader at Northgate station

Fares for passengers are collected through automated systems and enforced with a proof-of-payment policy that requires valid payment before boarding. Link stations lack a turnstile barrier and instead have a designated paid fare area that is delineated with signs and floor markings. This arrangement is similar to other light rail systems in North America, which also rely on proof-of-payment. A pilot study to add turnstiles and gates at 14 high-traffic stations is planned to begin by 2030 to reduce fare evasion; their use at surface stations was ruled out due to potential unsafe track crossings. A total of $51.3 million in fares was collected at Link stations in 2025; the farebox recovery ratio, which calculates the portion of operating costs covered by fare revenue, was 12 percent.

The primary method of payment is the ORCA card, a contactless smart card that is used across the Seattle metropolitan area by transit operators. In 2025, 48 percent of Link boardings were paid using ORCA cards and passes. The card system includes both stored value and prepaid passes that can be purchased and reloaded at Link station ticket vending machines, transit customer service centers, participating retailers, and online. ORCA users must tap their physical card or smartphone with the preloaded ORCA card onto a card reader before entering the paid fare area at a Link station; contactless credit cards, debit cards, and mobile payment platforms are also accepted through the ORCA card readers. Transfers from other modes, including buses, water taxis, and streetcars, are accepted using ORCA cards. Ticket vending machines at stations also dispense paper tickets in single trip and round trip amounts; a mobile ticketing app, known as "Transit Go", also generates valid fare for Link.

The system's fare policy is enforced by teams of fare ambassadors who are employed by Sound Transit and check passengers for valid proof of payment while aboard trains or in the paid fare zone at stations. Passengers who do not present a valid ticket or validated ORCA card are offered warnings, then fined one of two citation amounts or receive a civil infraction. Until 2021, fare inspectors and transit police officers on the 1 Line checked fares and issued warnings or a $124 citation to passengers who did not present a valid form of payment. The original enforcement system for non-paying riders was suspended in 2020 due to the COVID-19 pandemic and the racial disparities in received citations; the program was later replaced in 2022 with the fare ambassadors and civil penalties. The rate of fare evasion was 2.4 percent in 2019, but rose to an estimated 55 percent in 2023 due to reduced inspections.

Fares for the 1 Line and 2 Line are a flat rate of $3 for adults, $1 for passengers eligible for reduced fares, and free for people 18 years old or younger. The T Line has an adult fare of $2 and a reduced fare of $1. Reduced fares are available to elderly passengers, persons with disabilities, and low-income passengers enrolled in the ORCA Lift program. The 1 Line originally had a distance-based fare system that required ORCA card users to tap at a card reader before and after riding. The adult fare ranged from $2.25 for the shortest trips to $3.50 for longer distances, increasing at mile-based increments of 25 cents. A flat rate of $1 was charged for elderly passengers, persons with disabilities, and ORCA Lift enrollees; passengers under the age of 19 originally paid $1.50 until a statewide transit grant eliminated the fare in September 2022. The distance-based fare for the 1 Line and 2 Line was eliminated on August 30, 2024, as part of the opening of the Lynnwood extension. The T Line had no fare due to a subsidy from a Tacoma business association that expired in 2023 with the opening of the Hilltop extension.

== Infrastructure ==
Link comprises three lines that cover a total of 55 miles (89 km) in tracks. The 1 Line and 2 Line are maintained by King County Metro, who also control dispatching and run paratransit service along most of the corridors. They are sometimes described as light metro lines due to their extensive use of grade separation and longer trainsets, which are more similar to rapid transit systems rather than North American light rail. The 1 Line has extensive sections with tunnels and elevated guideways, but also uses at-grade tracks that intersect with cross streets and other traffic. The line's 7 miles (11 km) of at-grade tracks include semi-exclusive right-of-way in SODO with full crossing gates and a 4.5-mile (7.2 km) section in the median of Martin Luther King Jr. Way in the Rainier Valley with 28 signalized crossings and partial gates. These sections were the sites of more than 125 vehicular collisions and 32 pedestrian or bicyclist incidents involving Link trains from 2009 to 2024. Other surface sections are along freeways and maintain grade separation through existing overpasses and bridges. The 2 Line has a short section of track at street level around BelRed station with four at-grade crossings equipped with crossing arms. The T Line operates more similarly to a streetcar, with 47 total at-grade crossings, and primarily operates in mixed traffic outside of a single-track section in Downtown Tacoma with an exclusive lane. Its trains are directly operated by Sound Transit and maintained at a facility in Tacoma.

=== Rolling stock ===
Series 2 light rail vehicle

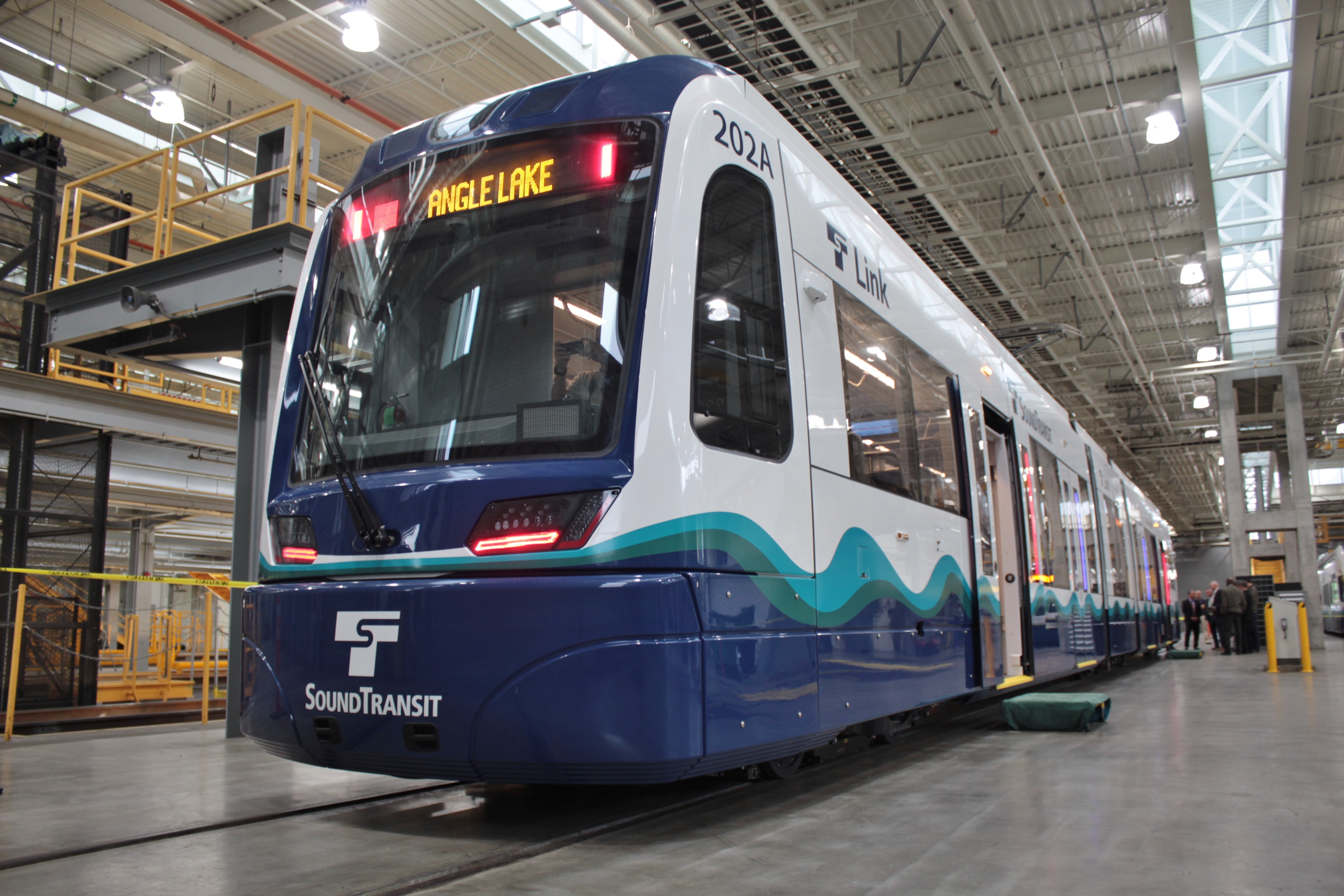
Exterior, on display at the Central OMF

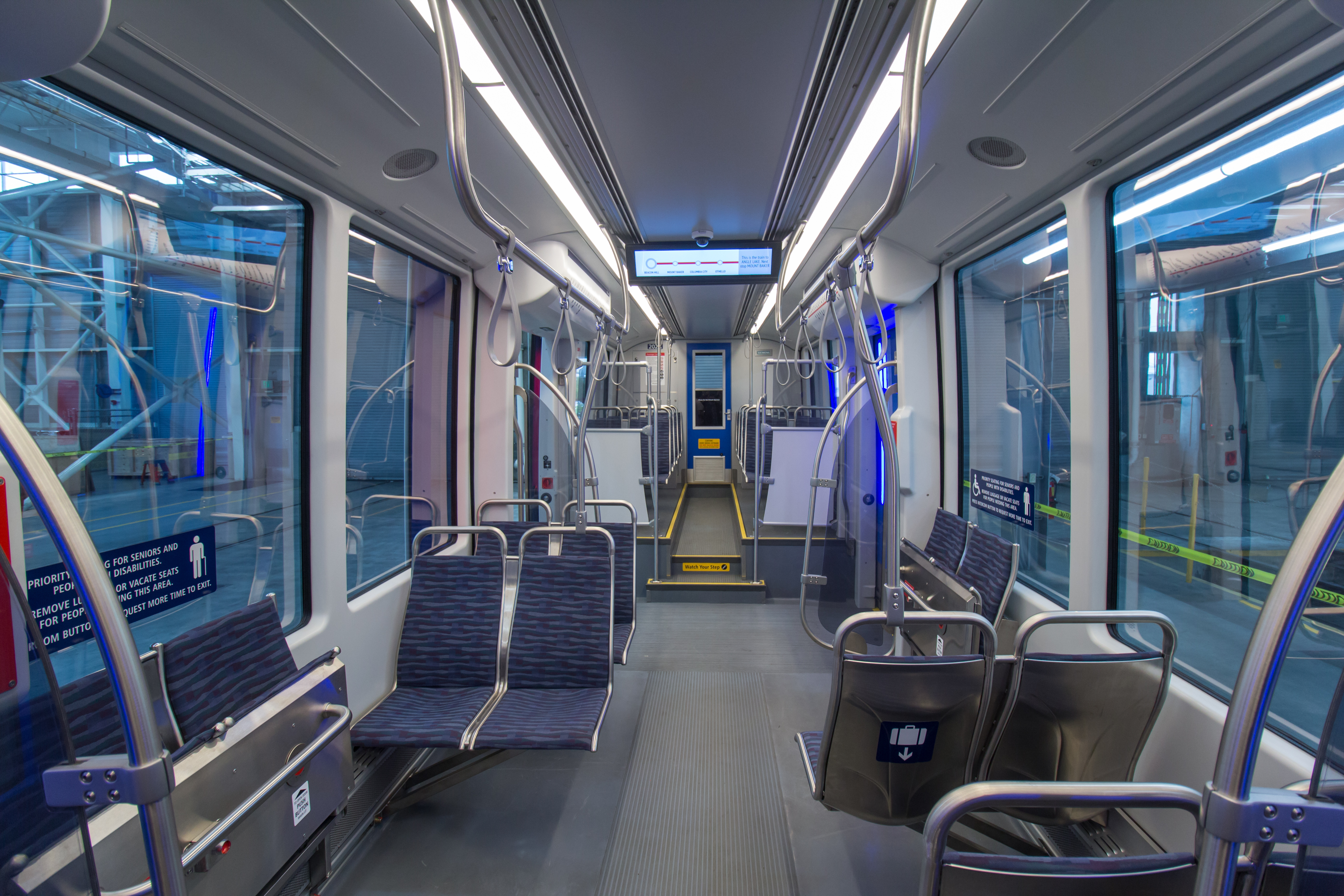
Interior of the passenger compartment

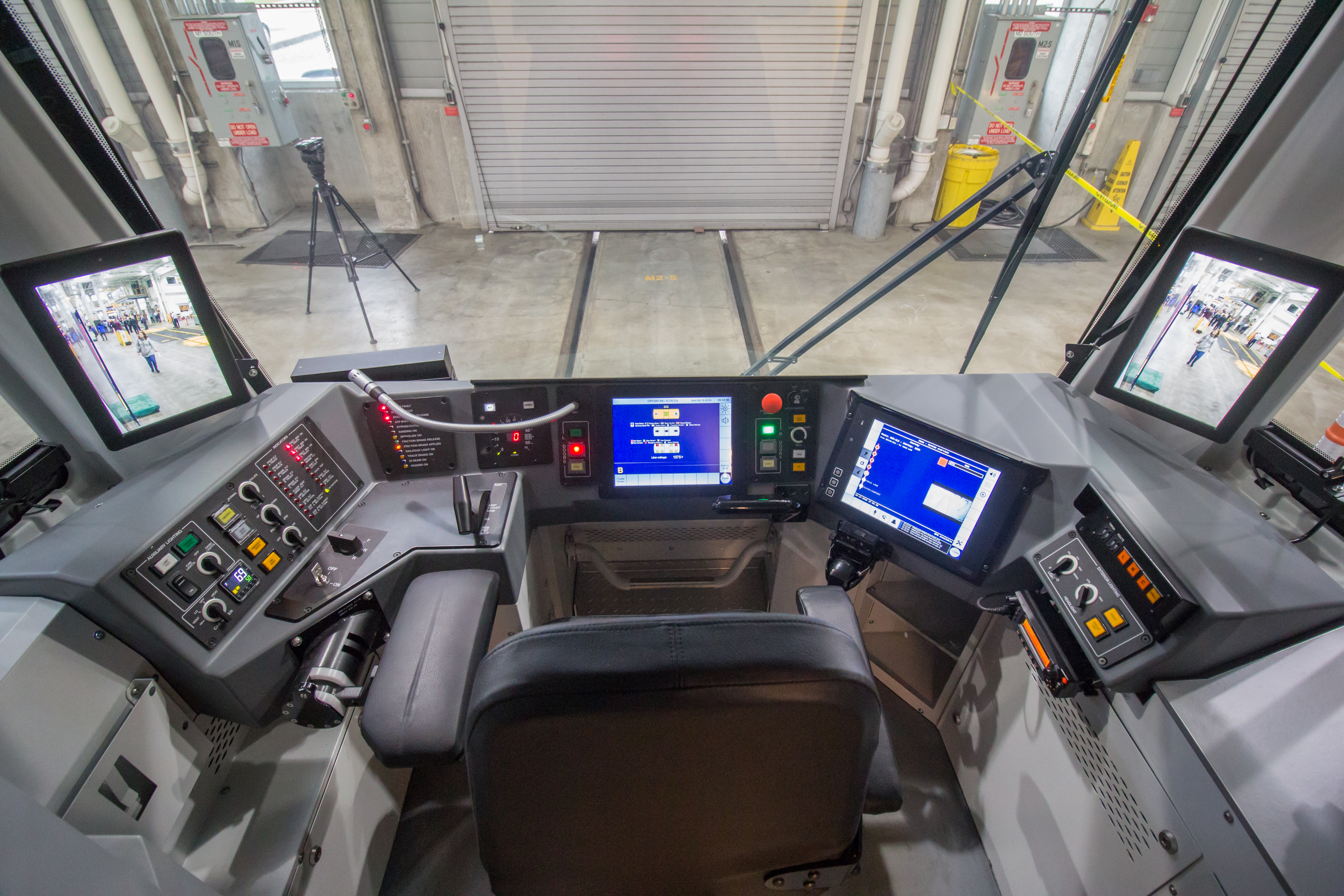
Interior of the operator's cab

As of 2025, the Link light rail system uses a total of 226 low-floor and accessible light rail vehicles: 218 for the 1 Line and 2 Line; and 8 for the T Line. The 1 Line and 2 Line fleet comprises two models, the Series 1 by Kinkisharyo–Mitsui and the Series 2 by Siemens Mobility, that are both 95 feet (29 m) long with a pair of operator cabs and an articulated center. Both models are able to run in four-car consists but do not have cross-compatibility. All Link vehicles allow for level boarding and feature accessible seating areas that can be folded up for wheelchair users. Digital signs with maps were added to trains beginning with the rollout of the Series 2 and subsequent refurbishing of the Series 1 vehicles.

The Series 1 fleet of 62 cars, manufactured by Kinkisharyo–Mitsui in Osaka and assembled in Everett, was delivered from 2006 to 2011. Each Series 1 car has 74 seats arranged primarily in transverse pairs as well as four areas with longitudinal folding seats also designated for use by wheelchairs and strollers. The listed capacity is 194 passengers during normal loads, with a maximum "crush load" of 252 people. The layout is 70 percent low floor, at a height of 14 inches (36 cm) above the rails, with raised sections at each end above a set of stairs. The cars have four doors on each side and a hanging bicycle hook above each of the luggage storage areas between the articulated sections. The trains have a top speed of 58 miles per hour (93 km/h), but typically operate at 35 mph (56 km/h) on surface sections and 55 mph (89 km/h) on elevated and tunneled sections.

The Series 2 fleet, retroactively designated the Siemens S700, was commissioned in 2016 as part of a $642 million order to support the ST2 expansion program. The vehicles were manufactured in Sacramento, California, and are the same length and width as the Series 1 fleet, but have larger windows, improved passenger information displays, and other interior features. The interior includes a wider articulated section, additional bicycle hooks, more longitudinal seating, onboard fire extinguishers, and under-seat luggage storage in the raised sections. Delivery of the S700s began in June 2019 and the first vehicle entered service in May 2021. The final car in the initial 152-car order is planned to be delivered by 2026; an additional 10 cars were ordered in 2023 and are scheduled to be delivered in 2027.

In 2022, Sound Transit began planning specifications for a Series 3 that would have approximately 106 vehicles. It is expected to begin delivery in 2029 and be complete in 2032 for the first batch of ST3 projects. Sound Transit declined to use open gangway trains and retain operator cabs on both ends of all cars to allow for operational flexibility. Series 3 light rail vehicles are planned to be delivered beginning in 2033 in lengths of up to 190 feet (58 m) per car depending on the selected configuration. By the end of the Sound Transit 3 expansion program in 2048, the Link system is planned to have 460 total light rail vehicles maintained at four operations and maintenance facilities.

The T Line fleet consists of eight low-floor articulated streetcars that are 66 feet (20.12 m) long, 8 feet (2.44 m) wide, and have two articulation joints at each end of the low-floor section. The first fleet of three Škoda 10T streetcars were manufactured in the Czech Republic by Škoda Transportation and delivered in 2003. Each Škoda car has 30 seats and can carry an additional 85 standing passengers at crush load capacity. Five Brookville Liberty streetcars were ordered in 2017 and delivered in 2022. The Brookville Liberty streetcars each have 26 seats and can carry a total of 100 passengers and several bicycles. The Škoda fleet is planned to be retired and traded to the Portland Streetcar system in exchange for three Brookville Liberty cars.

=== Electricity and signaling ===
Trains are supplied with electricity through an overhead catenary that is energized at 1,500 volts direct current for the 1 Line and 2 Line, and 750 volts for the T Line. Electricity is supplied to substations and converted into direct current (DC) in the appropriate voltage for use by Link. In the event of a substation outage, the adjacent substations can be used to allow operations to continue. The 1,500 V DC system, not used by other North American light rail systems, was chosen for the 1 Line and 2 Line to allow for substations to be spaced one mile (1.6 km) apart and fewer needing to be constructed. The current from the overhead catenary is converted to three-phase alternating current through on-board inverters that power the traction motors in each axle. The light rail tracks are not grounded and are monitored for potential stray current by detection systems. Since December 2020, the Link light rail system has been running fully on electricity from renewable sources without carbon emissions. Sound Transit is a participant in a wind power purchase program operated by Puget Sound Energy and also sources electricity from Seattle City Light, which has a carbon-neutral power supply.

Link uses a form of automatic train protection and train-to-wayside communication to prevent operators from exceeding the set speed limit for a given section. Trains are set to automatically brake if they exceed 58 miles per hour (93 km/h) on grade-separated sections and 38 miles per hour (61 km/h) on surface sections. Link also has transit signal priority on some at-grade sections that overrides traffic signals to allow trains to continue between stations without stopping. During joint bus–train operations in the Downtown Seattle Transit Tunnel, Link used automatic block signaling that controlled spacing with buses, which had to completely clear the platform before trains were allowed to proceed. The tunnel section was designed with headways of up to 90 seconds, while other sections support headways of 120 to 150 seconds. The tunnel was retrofitted with automatic train protection in December 2025. T Line trains are subject to normal traffic signals but are able to request overrides and priority using a train-to-wayside communication system.

=== Maintenance facilities ===
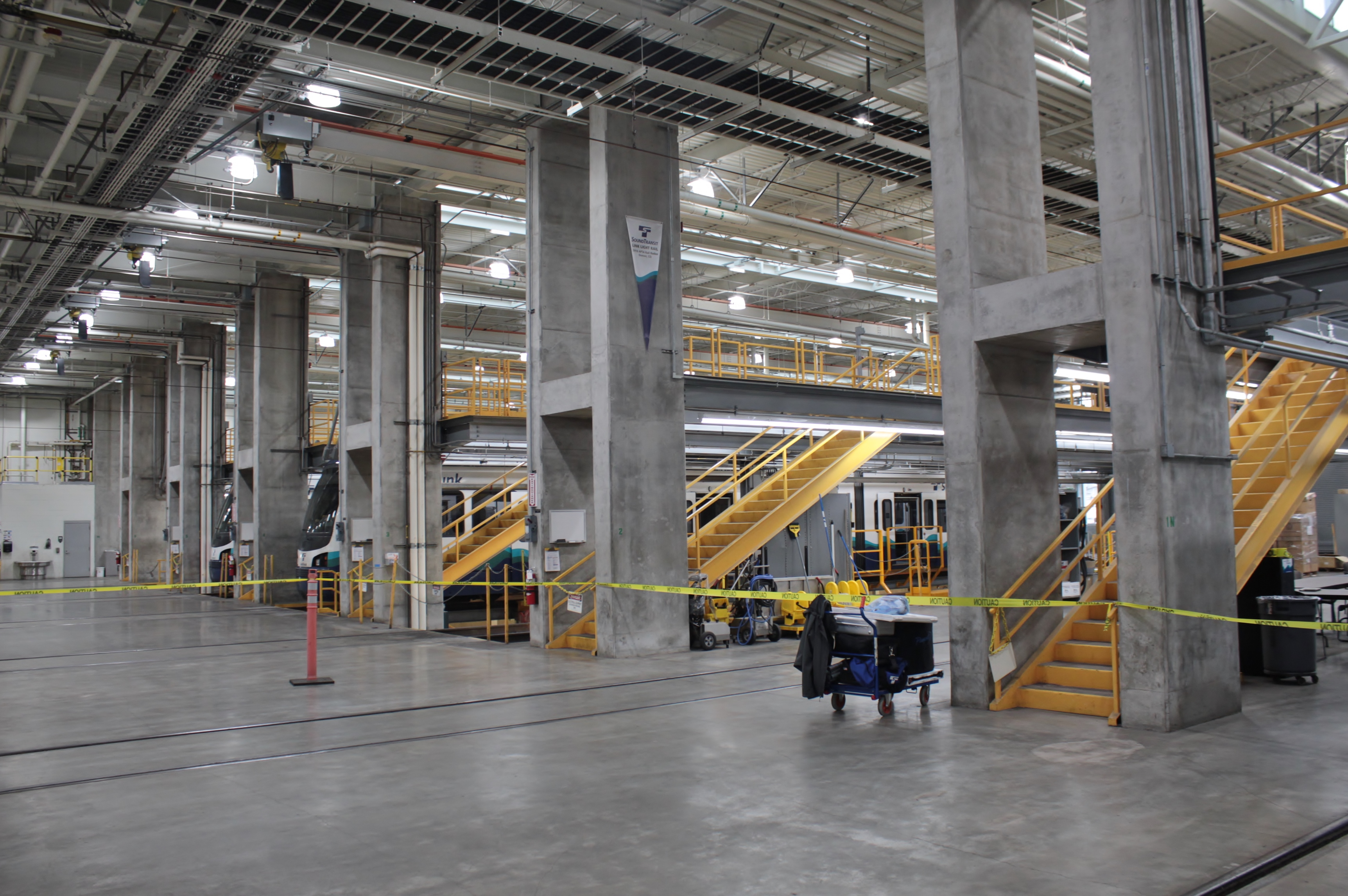
Train maintenance bays at the Central Operations and Maintenance Facility in Seattle

Link has three operations and maintenance facilities (OMFs) where trains are stored, maintained, and cleaned during off-peak and overnight hours: the Central OMF is in Seattle's SoDo neighborhood near SODO station on the 1 Line; the East OMF is near the Spring District in Bellevue on the 2 Line; and the Tacoma OMF, located east of Tacoma Dome Station on the T Line. Two more OMFs—the North facility in Everett and South in Federal Way—are funded by the Sound Transit 3 program and planned to begin construction in the late 2020s.

The Central OMF in Seattle covers 26 acres (10.5 ha) and opened in 2007 to serve 104 light rail vehicles on the original Central Link section. Its four-story maintenance building is 162,000 square feet (15,100 m^{2}) with a capacity of sixteen vehicles in nine bays as well as a communications center, repair center, training rooms, office space, and a train wash. After it was originally deferred, a maintenance-of-way building was constructed north of the main building in 2016 to house other facility teams and the agency's police department. The campus includes several pieces of public artwork, including a red neon sign salvaged from the adjacent Rainier Brewery and decorated utility poles that resemble horsetail reeds. Due to capacity constraints at the Central OMF until the completion of the 2 Line, Link trains on the 1 Line are also stored overnight at some stations.

The East OMF, on a 21-acre (8.5 ha) campus in the Spring District neighborhood of Bellevue, has a capacity of 96 vehicles and serves the 2 Line. Its maintenance building covers 145,000 square feet (13,500 m^{2}) and comprises 14 service bays, a train wash, and a 100 kW rooftop solar array. The facility opened in 2021 and was certified as LEED Gold for its environmentally sustainable features, which also include water-saving systems and energy-efficient machines. It supports up to 260 employees. The East OMF faces a section of the Eastrail bicycle and pedestrian trail and includes Nails, an art installation by German sculptor Christian Moeller that comprises 45 oversized nails, each measuring 11.5 to 30 feet (3.5 to 9.1 m) tall, that are bent and painted in striped patterns. Surplus land on the south side of the OMF was transferred to a non-profit housing developer in 2024 for the construction of a 234-unit affordable housing complex that is scheduled to open in 2026.

The Tacoma OMF is used exclusively by the T Line and directly maintained by Sound Transit unlike the other facilities. It opened in 2002 and was originally designed to accommodate three vehicles. The facility was expanded by 103,000 square feet (9,600 m^{2}) from 2017 to 2021 as part of preparations for the Hilltop extension, which required the use of five more vehicles.

== Future expansion ==
Map of routes and stations in operation and under construction as of 2026

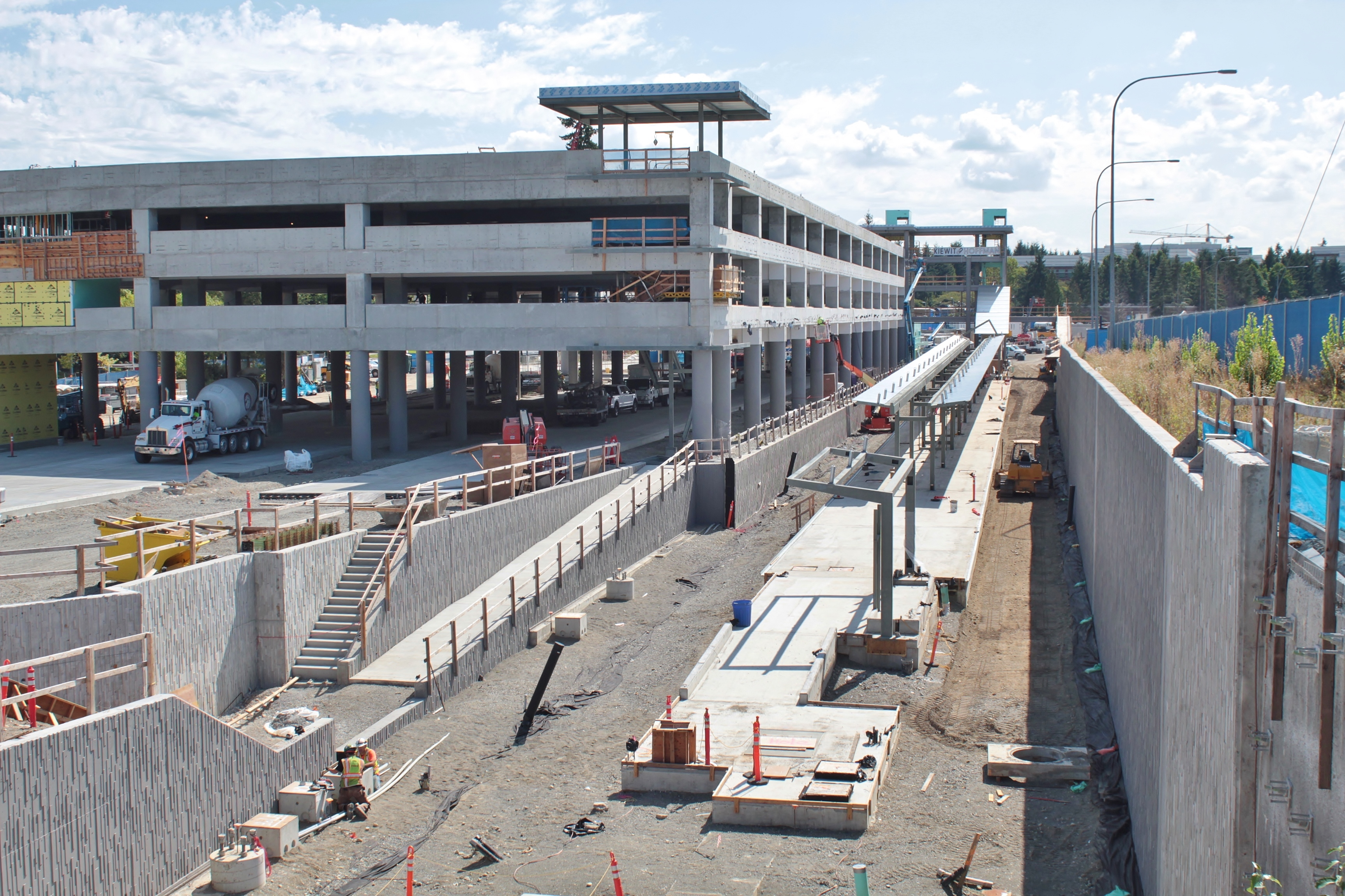
Redmond Technology station on the 2 Line under construction in 2019

The Link light rail system is planned to be expanded to 116 miles (187 km) with five lines and 70 stations by 2050. The future system is anticipated to serve 750,000 daily passengers at full build-out and cost up to $131 billion. The expansions are primarily funded through local taxes passed by voters in a pair of multimodal transit ballot measures. The Sound Transit 2 (ST2) package, passed in 2008, funded several extensions to be finished by 2026, including three that opened between 2016 and 2021. Sound Transit 3 (ST3) was approved in 2016 and funded new extensions of Link that will open between 2024 and 2050, including projects in Pierce and Snohomish counties. Several deferred or truncated projects from ST2 were also funded and accelerated by the ST3 plan.

Since 2016, the original timelines for both expansion packages have been modified due to the COVID-19 pandemic, labor shortages, and construction issues. Sound Transit adopted a "realignment plan" in 2021 that delayed most projects by two to five years, primarily to address a $6.5 billion shortfall in projected revenue that would be needed to avoid reaching a state-imposed debt limit by 2029. The cost estimate for the largest project in the ST3 package, the West Seattle/Ballard Link Extension, increased by 50 percent between 2019 and 2021, reaching $12 billion due to higher property values and lower revenue amid the pandemic. A set of new delays, mainly affecting Sound Transit 2 projects, was announced in 2022 following a four-month regional strike by concrete truck drivers, as well as unexpected conditions discovered during work. The Sound Transit 3 program underwent another realignment in 2026 to address a $35 billion shortfall, with several projects deferred indefinitely.

All five lines are planned to connect at various hubs and interline in some areas to increase frequency in high-demand corridors. They converge on a regional "spine" that generally follows the Interstate 5 corridor from Everett to Tacoma. Upon completion of several planned extensions in the 2020s and 2030s, the 1 Line would run from Tacoma Dome Station to Downtown Seattle, where it would use a new tunnel, and continue northwest to Ballard. The 2 Line and 3 Line would interline from the existing Downtown Seattle Transit Tunnel on the existing 1 Line corridor to Snohomish County, sharing tracks as far north as Mariner in southern Everett. The 3 Line would continue south to West Seattle and north to Downtown Everett, while the 2 Line serves Bellevue and Redmond. The 4 Line, connecting Kirkland to Issaquah, would interline with the 2 Line in Downtown Bellevue. In addition to the new lines, three infill stations in Seattle are planned to be built by 2031 at Boeing Access Road, Graham Street, and Northeast 130th Street.

In 2023, the Seattle Department of Transportation published its 20-year city transportation plan that included proposals for additional Link light rail lines. These include an east–west connection between Ballard and the University District; a northern extension from Ballard to Northgate and Lake City; a line serving Aurora Avenue North; a line serving Denny Way; a line that follows 23rd Avenue; and additional connections from Tukwila International Boulevard station to West Seattle and SoDo.

=== 3 Line (Everett–West Seattle) ===
The 3 Line is planned to open in 2035 with the completion of the West Seattle Link Extension, which would connect West Seattle to an interim terminus at SODO station. The line would be extended north to replace the 1 Line following the completion of the Ballard Link Extension, which would include a new 3.3-mile (5.3 km) tunnel in Downtown Seattle for trains arriving from the Rainier Valley. The final terminus of the 3 Line is planned to be Everett Station, a multimodal hub in Downtown Everett, upon completion of the Everett Link Extension in 2037 or 2041 depending on the level of available funds.

=== 4 Line (South Kirkland–Issaquah) ===
The 4 Line, the fifth Link light rail line, is scheduled to open in 2050, depending on funding, and would only serve the Eastside. The line is planned to run from the South Kirkland Park and Ride towards Downtown Bellevue, where it would interline with the 2 Line, and continue along Interstate 90 to Issaquah. It is planned to include four new stations and total 11.8 miles (19.0 km) in length. An earlier proposal for the line continued further north on the Cross Kirkland Corridor to a terminus in Downtown Kirkland but was not included in the ST3 plan due to opposition from local residents.

=== Future segments ===
Some figures and dates are provisional due to funding gaps, quality control, geological risk, and labor issues that have caused delays in some projects.

Major Link light rail expansion projects
Project	Line(s)	Status	Termini		Length	New stations	Expected opening
West Seattle Link Extension	3 Line	Design	SODO	Alaska Junction	4.1 miles (6.6 km)	3	2035
Tacoma Dome Link Extension	1 Line	Environmental review	Federal Way Downtown	Tacoma Dome	8.5 miles (13.7 km)	4	2035
Ballard Link Extension (Note: In May 2026, the Ballard Link Extension project was divided into two segments: the initial segment from International District/Chinatown station to the Seattle Center (6 stations) is funded, while the Seattle Center–Ballard segment (3 stations) is deferred.)	1 Line	Environmental review	International District/Chinatown	Ballard	7.7 miles (12.4 km)	8	2042 to 2060
Everett Link Extension	3 Line	Environmental review	Lynnwood City Center	Everett	16.3 miles (26.2 km)	6–7	2037 to 2041
TCC Tacoma Link Extension	T Line	Planned	St. Joseph	Tacoma Community College	3.5 miles (5.6 km)	6	2043
South Kirkland–Issaquah Link Extension	4 Line	Planned	South Kirkland	Issaquah	11.8 miles (19.0 km)	4	2050

== Safety and security ==
Sound Transit contracts with local law enforcement agencies to provide policing services, which include patrolling transit facilities, monitoring traffic, and responding to emergency incidents. These include a dedicated unit of the King County Sheriff's Office and members of the Lynnwood Police Department who are contracted to provide coverage within King and Snohomish counties, respectively. Other local police departments also have dedicated teams to patrol transit stations. Members of the Federal Air Marshal Service also patrol light rail stations and trains as part of federal anti-terrorism programs. Sound Transit also contracts with four private security firms to provide a total of 550 uniformed officers who patrol stations and trains and respond to incidents. All trains and stations have emergency intercom systems and Sound Transit also allows passengers to use text messages to contact security officers.

From 2009 to 2026, a total of 230 vehicular, pedestrian, and cyclist collisions involving Link trains have been recorded with 11 deaths and 88 injuries. They primarily occur on a 4.5-mile (7.2 km) section of at-grade tracks on the 1 Line in the Rainier Valley, which lacks crossing barriers. The majority of incidents are vehicular collisions caused by drivers who make an illegal left turn at intersections. The rate of track injuries and fatalities on Link were lower than peer light rail systems in the United States, averaging 8.1 collisions per one million miles of revenue service from 2015 to 2021. A Sound Transit study in 2022 endorsed several pilot projects, such as handheld swing gates for pedestrians and new barriers for vehicles, to reduce the number of collisions. By 2024, new illuminated signs for pedestrians had been added and the volume of train bells was increased to 90 decibels; a new pilot to use alternating headlights in a "wig-wag" pattern on trains began in 2025. A full rebuild of the section to add grade separation is estimated to cost $1.1 billion to $1.7 billion.

The use of recreational drugs at stations and onboard trains increased significantly during the COVID-19 pandemic following the removal of fare enforcement officers and changes to Washington's state drug laws. Sound Transit began to block seating areas near operator cabs in 2022 to prevent fumes and smoke from affecting employees. The University of Washington School of Public Health collected air and surface samples from 19 light rail trains in Seattle and Portland over a 28-day period in early 2023 to measure levels of drug residue onboard transit vehicles. Their study, which was partially funded by Sound Transit, found trace amounts of methamphetamine on all surface samples and most air samples, along with fentanyl on half of surface samples. All but one of the samples stayed within the Environmental Protection Agency's limit for pharmaceutical worker exposure to fentanyl and the amount for both drugs was described as "too low" to cause health issues. Sound Transit responded to the study with plans to increase their security presence, add more frequent cleanings, and retrofit Link trains with upgraded MERV 13 air filters.

== See also ==
- Seattle Streetcar
- List of rail transit systems in the United States
- List of United States light rail systems
