= Jackson Park (Seattle) =

Park in Seattle, Washington, United States

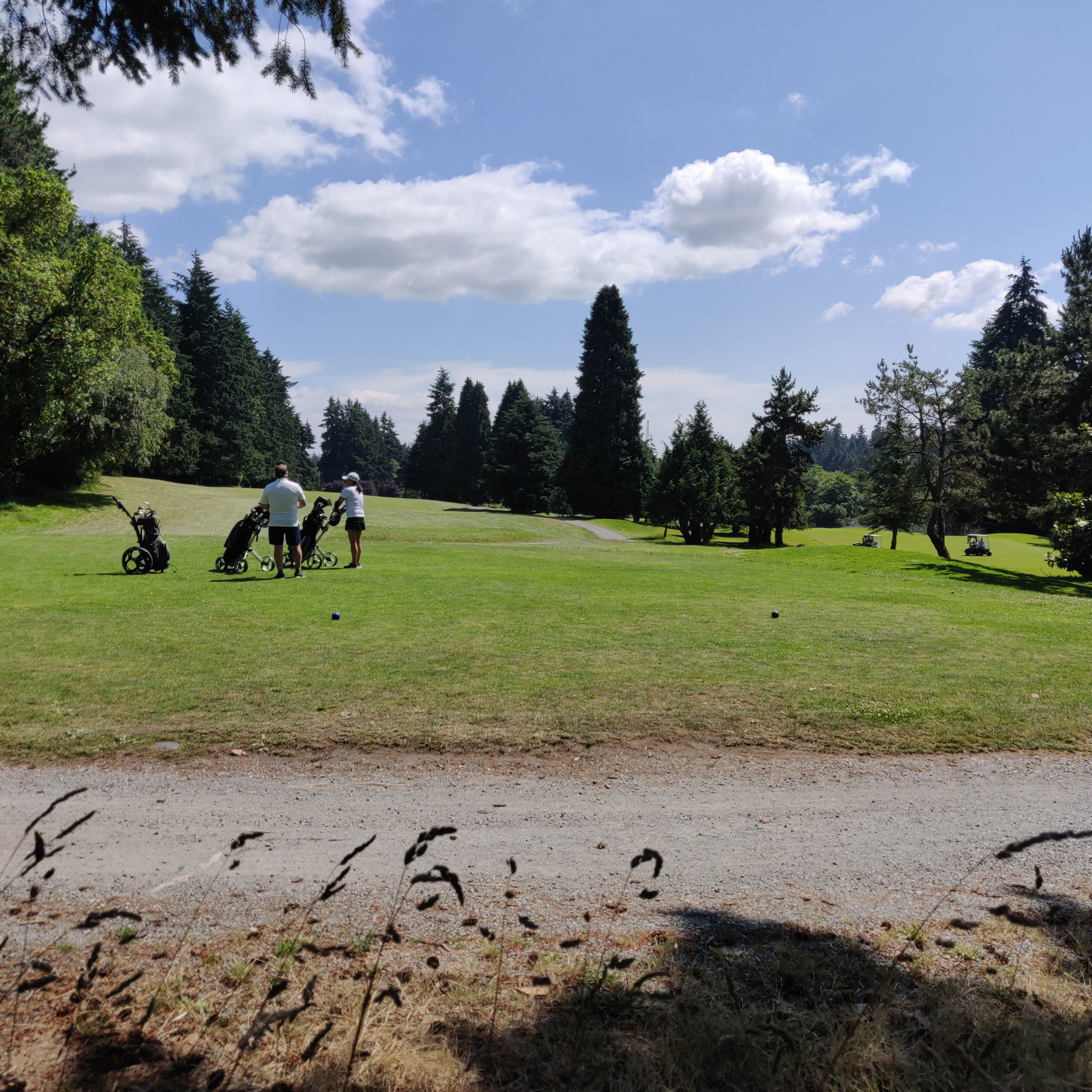
- Jackson Park Golf Course in 2020
- Interactive map of Jackson Park
- Type: Urban park and Golf course
- Location: Seattle, Washington
- Coordinates: 47°43′58.9″N 122°19′7.3″W
- Area: 160.7-acre (0.650 km^{2})
- Established: 1928; 98 years ago
- Operator: Seattle Parks and Recreation

Jackson Park is a 160.7-acre (0.650 km^{2}) public park and golf course in north Seattle, Washington, occupying most of the space between N.E. 145th Street on the north, N.E. 130th Street on the south, 5th Avenue N.E. on the west, and 15th Avenue N.E. on the east. It opened to the public in 1928.

The park was named for U.S. president Andrew Jackson. A process to rename the park due to Jackson's role in the removal of indigenous peoples began in 2026. A committee organized by Seattle Parks and Recreation will solicit proposed names from the public and forward suggestions to the department's superintendent.

== Golf course ==
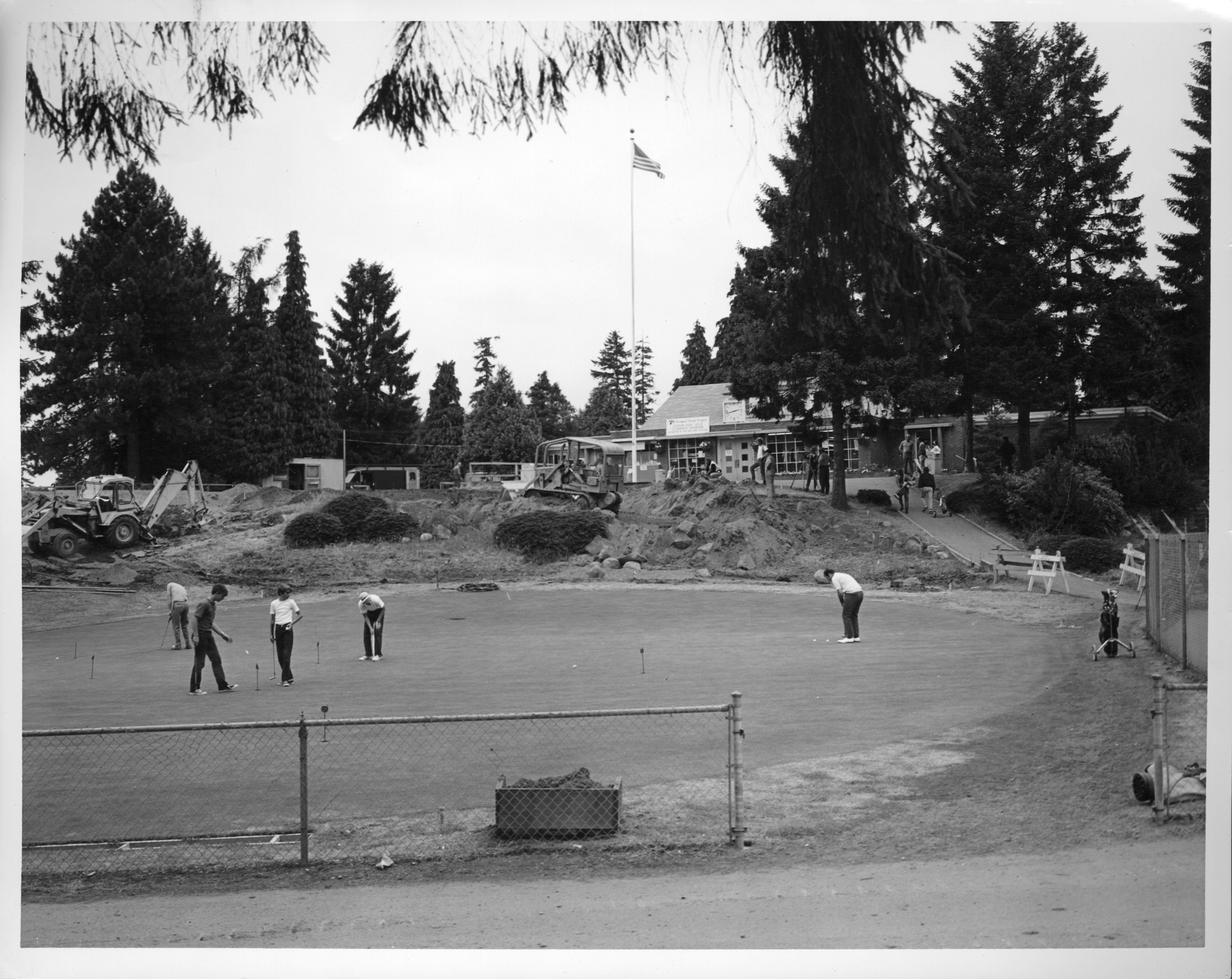
Putting green, Jackson Park Golf Course, 1970.

Jackson Park has both a nine-hole par three course and a full eighteen-hole long course. It offers amenities such as a pro shop, cafe and bar, cart rentals, driving range, and putting practice greens. It underwent renovations in 2001 to allow Thornton Creek to flow through in a more environmentally beneficial way. This renovation added much water to the front nine and increased the difficulty significantly. The course also offers junior camps that run throughout the summer. The official course record is 62 and was set by amateur golfer, and former Seattle Mariners pitcher, Erik Hanson in the 2015 Seattle Amateur. Fellow amateur Vinnie Murphy equaled that score in the 2016 edition of the tournament.

The golf course was one of six finalist sites proposed for a northern bus base for Metro Transit in the 1980s. It was not chosen due to backlash from golfers and local residents.

== Neighborhood ==
The neighborhood surrounding the park is sometimes referred to as Jackson Park. Its boundaries are the city of Shoreline to the north, the neighborhood of Lake City to the east, the Northgate area to the south, and the neighborhood of Haller Lake to the west.
