= First Hill Streetcar =

Streetcar line in Seattle, Washington

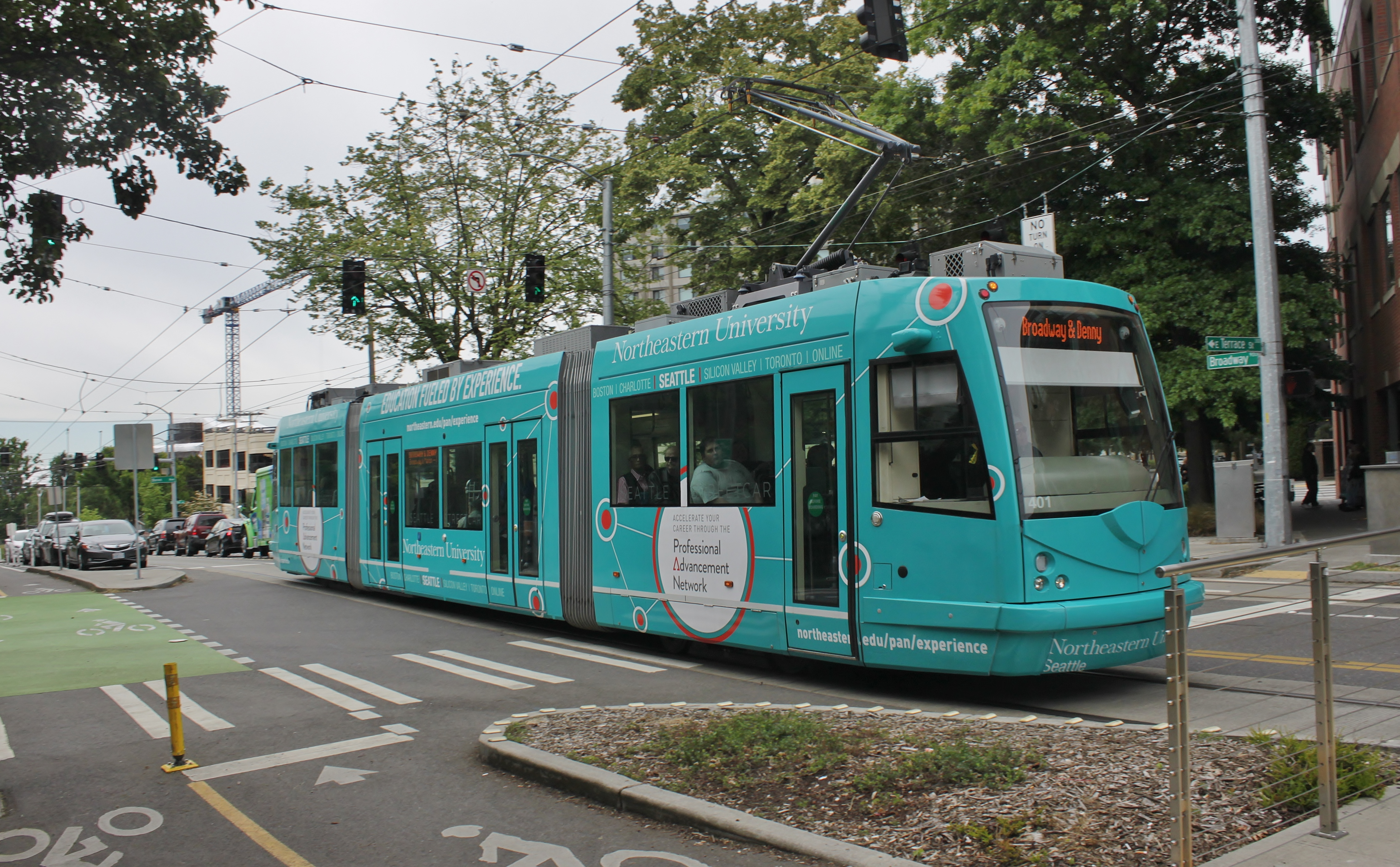
- Streetcar on Broadway approaching the Terrace Street stop

Overview
- Owner: City of Seattle
- Line number: 96 (used internally)
- Termini: Pioneer Square, Downtown Seattle; Capitol Hill Station, Capitol Hill
- Stations: 10
- Website: First Hill Streetcar

Service
- Type: Streetcar
- System: Seattle Streetcar
- Operator: King County Metro
- Rolling stock: Inekon Trio Type 121
- Ridership: 1,269,768 (2024)

History
- Opened: January 23, 2016

Technical
- Line length: 2.5 mi (4.0 km)
- Number of tracks: 2
- Character: Street running, in mixed traffic
- Track gauge: 4 ft 8 1/2 in (1,435 mm) standard gauge
- Electrification: Overhead line, 750 V DC

The First Hill Streetcar, officially the First Hill Line, is a streetcar route in Seattle, Washington, United States, forming part of the modern Seattle Streetcar system. It travels 2.5 miles (4.0 km) between several neighborhoods in central Seattle, including the International District, First Hill, and Capitol Hill. The line has ten stops and runs primarily in mixed traffic on South Jackson Street and Broadway.

The streetcar line was proposed in 2005 as an alternative to a cancelled Link light rail station on First Hill, with the goal of connecting the neighborhood to other light rail stations. The $135 million project, funded primarily by Sound Transit, was approved by voters and the city council in 2008. The city government selected the Broadway corridor and began construction on the line in April 2012, also working on a parallel protected bicycle lane.

Construction was completed in late 2014, but delays in the delivery and testing of the streetcar vehicles pushed the opening of the line to January 23, 2016. A proposed connection to the South Lake Union Streetcar line was planned to be constructed in the late 2010s, but was suspended by the city government in 2018.

== History ==
=== Background and approval ===
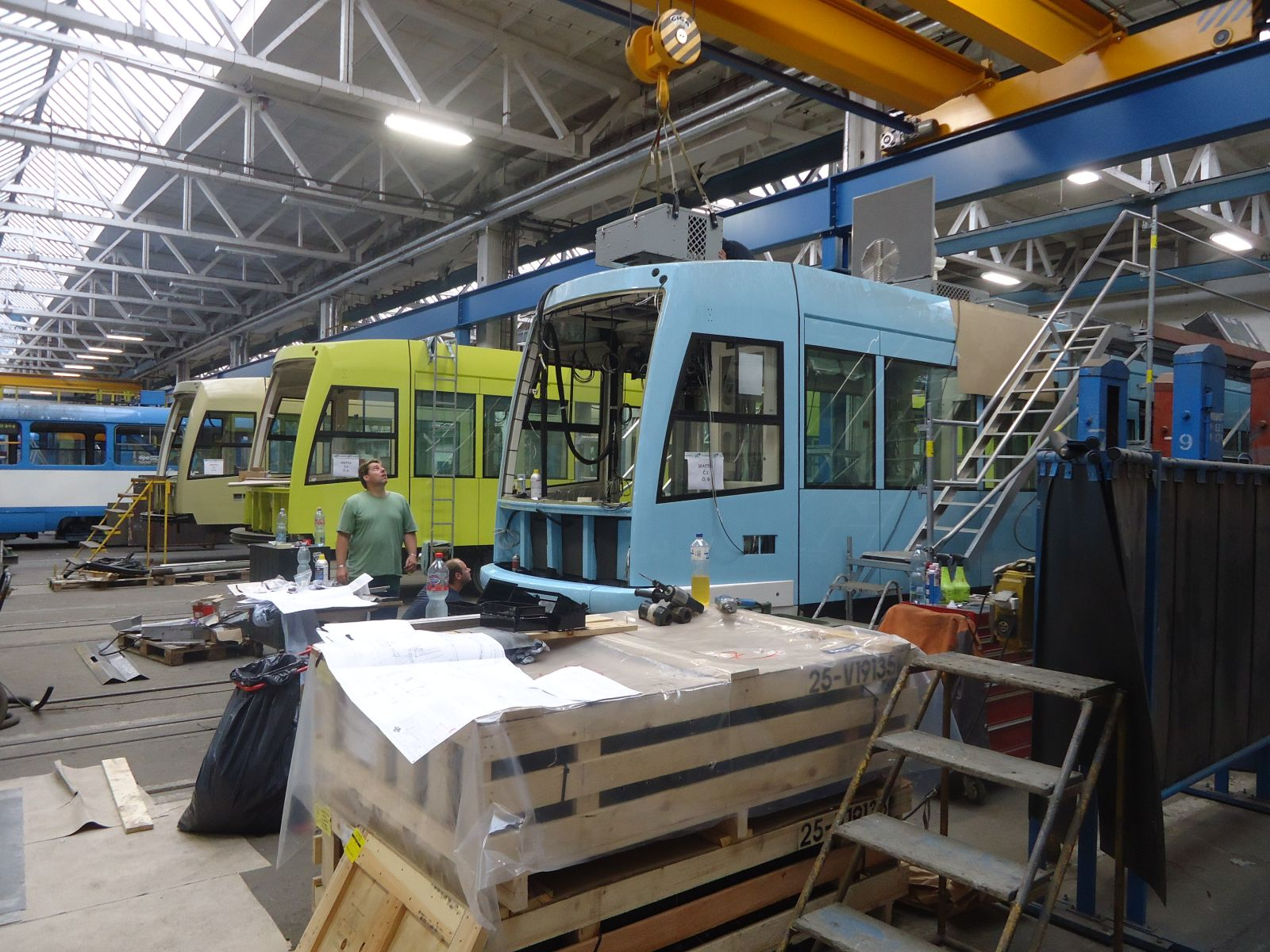
First Hill Streetcars under construction at the Inekon Trams factory in the Czech Republic

First Hill and the Broadway corridor were historically served by several lines under the private and municipal streetcar system, beginning with the first line constructed in 1891 and ending in 1941 with the introduction of city trolleybuses. First Hill, a major regional destination due to its concentration of medical facilities and Seattle University, was slated to receive an underground Link light rail station under the system's first planned expansion from Downtown Seattle to the University District, passed by voters in 1996. A technical study revealed tunneling through the weak soil under First Hill involved high risks and would cost $350 million beyond the project's proposed budget, so the Sound Transit board voted in July 2005 to remove the First Hill station from their preferred light rail route.

In lieu of light rail service, Sound Transit commissioned studies on alternative means of improving transit service to the neighborhood, leading King County Executive Ron Sims to suggest a streetcar connecting with the Capitol Hill light rail station. Sound Transit, the city government, and neighborhood stakeholders convened The First Hill Work Program to investigate alternative modes and projects, among them bus improvements to the Broadway and Madison Street corridors and a streetcar from International District/Chinatown station to Capitol Hill. The Work Program was completed in April 2007 and concluded a two-mile (3.2 km) streetcar on Broadway and South Jackson Street would be a feasible way to connect First Hill with the light rail system while acting as a potential catalyst for new transit-oriented development. A preliminary analysis in 2005 found the streetcar would cost up to $122 million to construct and attract 3,000 weekday riders if built.

The First Hill Streetcar project was included in the Sound Transit 2 plan, which was approved by the Sound Transit board and placed on the Roads and Transit ballot measure for the November 2007 election. The ballot measure was rejected by voters, but Sound Transit 2 was passed by voters as a standalone ballot measure in November 2008 and included $120 million in funding for the streetcar. The Seattle City Council approved the First Hill line in December as part of a citywide streetcar network that would expand on the existing South Lake Union Streetcar. An interlocal agreement between the city and Sound Transit was signed in October 2009 to allow the city to design and construct the streetcar while using funds from the transit expansion plan, which would also cover the $5.2 million annual operating budget. While initially projected to open in 2016, the project timeline was accelerated by three years under the agreement.

=== Routing decision and construction ===
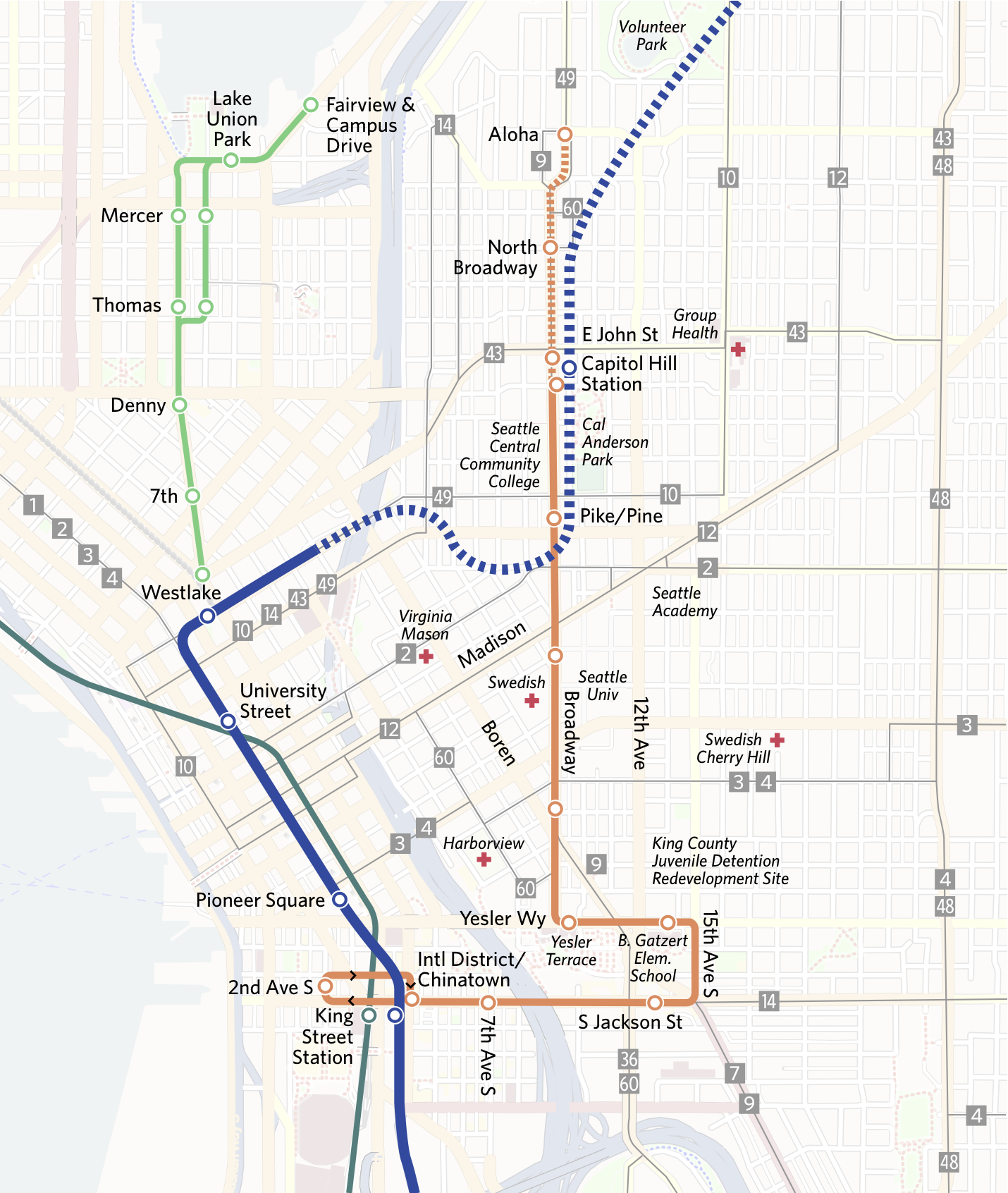
Proposed route for the First Hill Streetcar, 2009

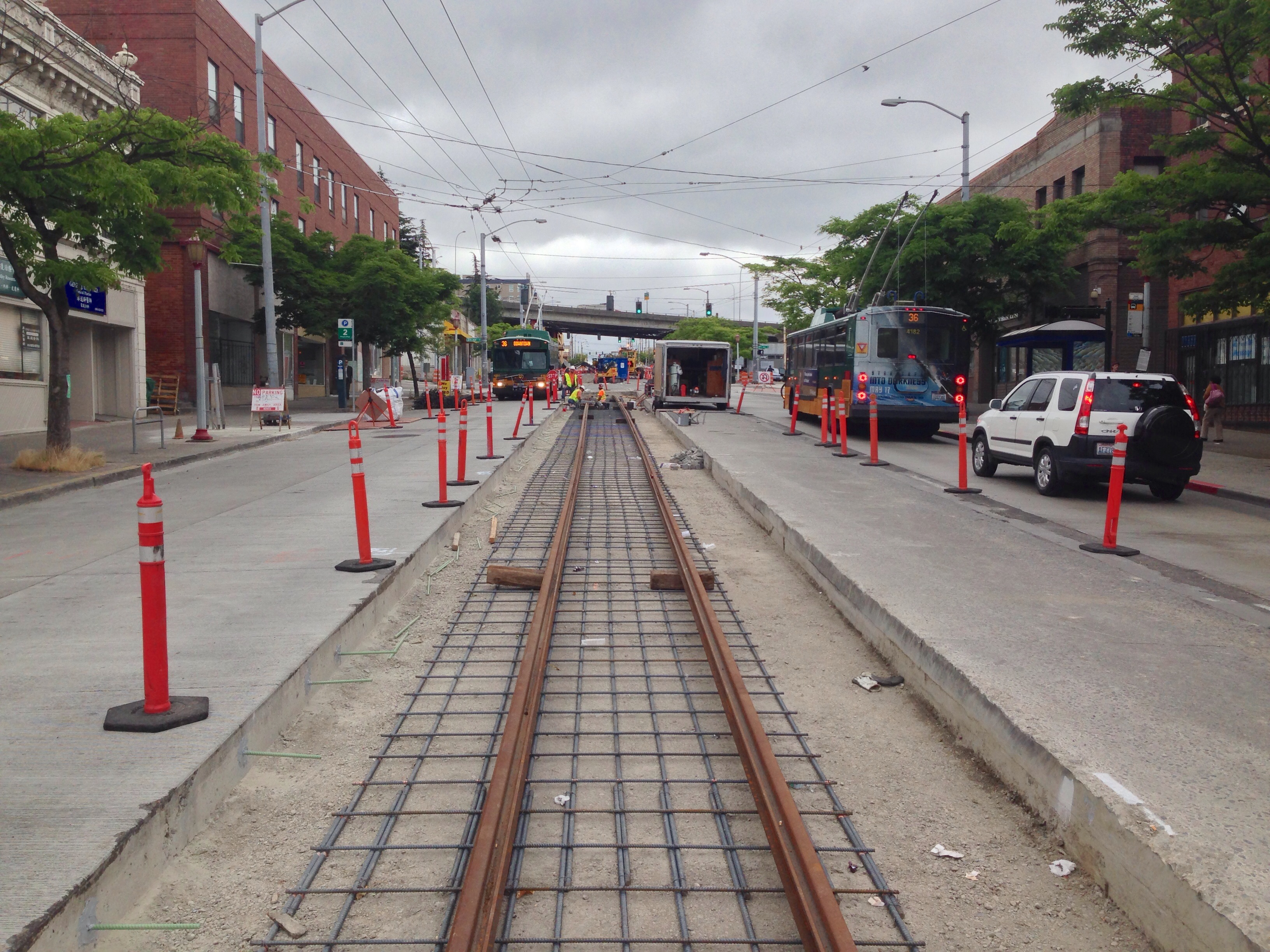
Track construction underway on Jackson Street in June 2013

The Seattle Department of Transportation (SDOT) presented three basic route alignments for public consideration in December 2009: beginning with a common corridor on Jackson Street with a one-way loop between Pioneer Square and International District/Chinatown station, the streetcar would use either 12th or 14th avenues to reach Yesler Terrace, then continue north on Broadway, Boren Avenue, or 12th Avenue. Near Capitol Hill station, the streetcar would split into a one-way couplet between Broadway and 11th Avenue with a terminal at Denny Way.

Despite community support for the 12th Avenue option and First Hill organizations backing the Boren option, SDOT recommended the Broadway route with no couplet or one-way loop. Other activists also petitioned the city for an extension to the business district on North Broadway, terminating near Aloha Street, which would require a separate funding source. Mayor Mike McGinn endorsed the Broadway route and the city council unanimously approved the alignment in May 2010, with 10 stops and 10-minute weekday headways.

Pre-construction activities for the project began in January 2011 and a formal groundbreaking was held on April 23, 2012. The project also included the construction of a two-way protected bicycle lane on the east side of Broadway that was added as a result of cycling accidents on the South Lake Union line. Track-laying began over the summer on Yesler Way and on Broadway between Pine and Howell streets, causing street closures and other traffic disruptions. During work on the Broadway section, Stacy and Witbeck contractors excavated railroad ties used by the original streetcar system until the 1940s. Trackwork on South Jackson Street began in early 2013 after completion of sewer and utility work in the International District. Due to the existing trolleybus and electrical wires above Broadway and South Jackson Street, SDOT elected to forgo wiring for its downhill, inbound track and instead rely on an onboard battery.

=== Testing, opening, and later issues ===
Street construction and electrical installation were completed in late 2014, but the commencement of service was delayed to the following year due to procurement issues with the Czech streetcar manufacturer, Inekon Trams, and a Seattle-based partner that would assemble half the fleet. Inekon's delay was blamed on an existing backlog of orders, the battery systems, and a redesign required by a change in fire regulations. The project overran its $134 million budget by $1.6 million, which was paid by Inekon as part of their contract penalties. Testing of the first streetcar began in March 2015 and acceptance tests were completed on all five vehicles by October. The final phase of testing, including 310 miles (500 km) of operation and a five-train simulation, was completed in early January 2016.

The First Hill Streetcar began service with a soft launch on January 23, 2016, announced the previous day by the city government. Passenger fares were waived entirely for the first two weeks of operation, leading up to a formal grand opening during a Lunar New Year festival in the International District on February 13, 2016. In its first year of operation, the streetcar averaged 3,050 weekday riders and met year-end projections, but by June 2017 the line was under-performing in ridership and fare revenue projections.

The First Hill line was criticized for its slow, meandering route without transit-only lanes or other priority measures to give it a time advantage over buses or pedestrians. While SDOT included bicycle-friendly features and pathways parallel to the streetcar, the tracks remained the cause of serious crashes, including a fatal incident on Yesler Way in May 2016. A lawsuit alleging fault for the cyclist's death was filed against the city government and Sound Transit by her family and settled in 2018. Another crash, which resulted in severe injuries to a cyclist at South Jackson Street and 12th Avenue South, was settled in 2019 with $1.55 million paid for by the city. SDOT planned to install a rubber flange filler between the track and concrete, but found that it would cause additional hazards and not last an adequate amount of time.

Streetcar service on the First Hill line was halted indefinitely on March 2, 2017, due to an incident where a streetcar lost electrical power and slid uncontrolled downhill for over two blocks after a brake failure. The vehicle was stopped at a curve in the tracks by an emergency parking brake that engaged automatically; the two passengers on board were uninjured and there was no damage. Service resumed on March 20 after modifications to the load contactor were installed and tested; streetcars, however, remained temporarily restricted to 7 miles per hour (11 km/h) on the steepest sections of Broadway.

SDOT announced plans in 2018 to improve streetcar service on Broadway by adding a southbound business-and-transit lane between Union and Madison streets and prohibiting certain turning movements at three intersections. Other reliability projects, including the installation of transit signal priority on Jackson Street and turn restrictions on Yesler Way, were completed in 2018. During 2026 FIFA World Cup matchdays at Lumen Field, the First Hill Line was temporarily truncated to South Jackson Street and 5th Avenue South in Chinatown–International District due to a street closure around the Occidental Mall station.

=== Proposed expansions ===
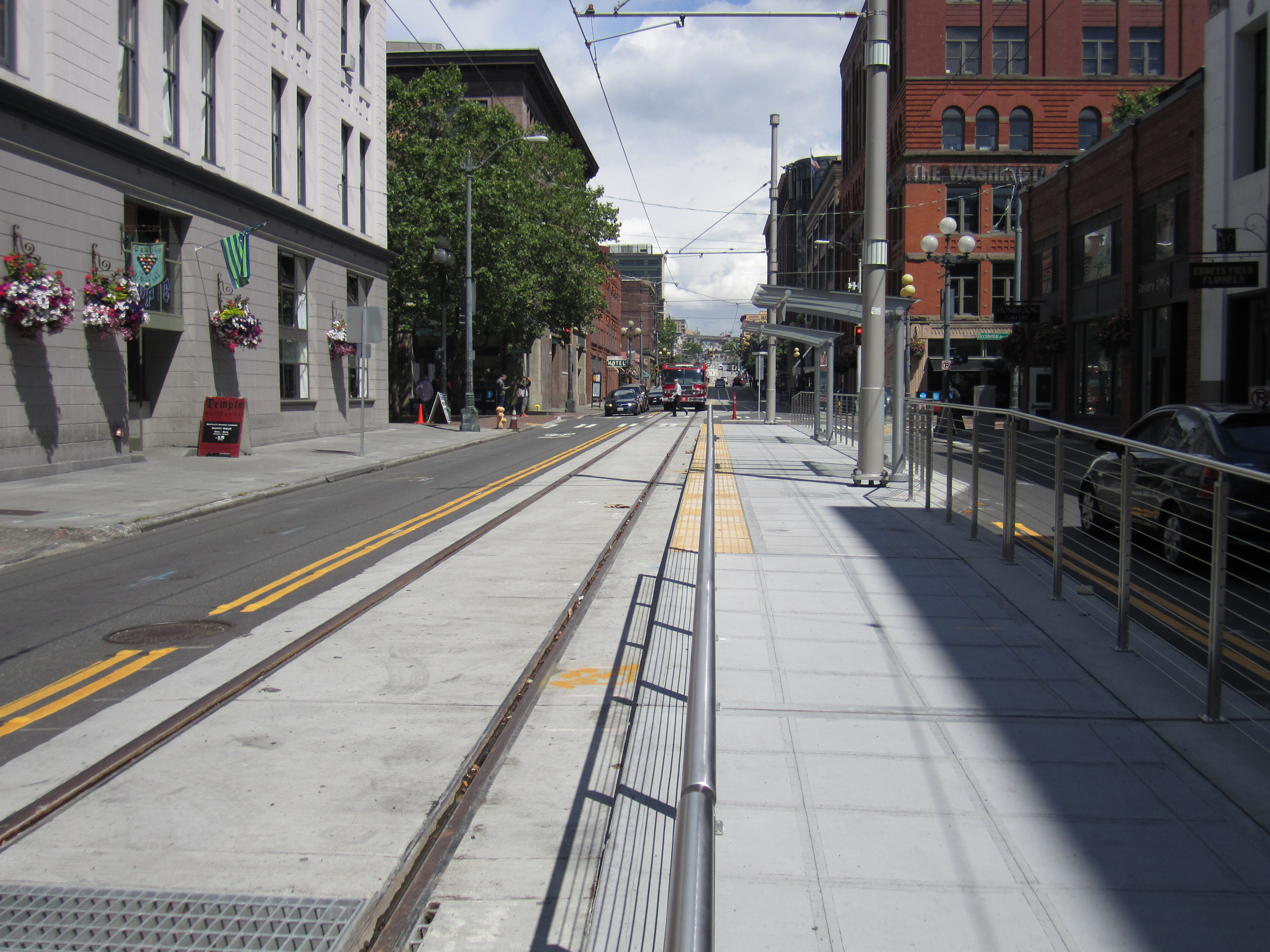
The streetcar's current southern terminus, on South Jackson Street at Occidental Avenue in Pioneer Square

A streetcar network plan published by the city government in 2008 explored extensions of the First Hill line to the Central District and on Rainier Avenue, connecting Broadway to the Mount Baker light rail station at Martin Luther King Jr. Way.

The initial plans for the First Hill line included service north of Denny Way to Aloha Street, but this section was eliminated under the Sound Transit 2 funding plan. The 1/2-mile (0.8 km) streetcar extension was supported by community groups and merchants in the Broadway business district, who lobbied the city to study and design the $20 million project in 2010. A car tab fee rejected by city voters in 2011 would have funded $18 million for various streetcar projects, including the extension to Aloha Street. As design work progressed, the cost of the project rose to $25 million, which would be covered by a Puget Sound Regional Council grant and a local improvement district levied on local property owners. The city government completed 90 percent design for the extension to Aloha Street project in 2015 and chose a terminus at East Roy Street and an intermediate stop at East Harrison Street. Business leaders grew skeptical of the streetcar's cost and design, particularly its effects on truck access. Work on the extension was halted in December 2016 and put on indefinite hold in October 2017 alongside other street improvements, including the protected bicycle lane extension.

An extension of the First Hill Streetcar to connect with the existing South Lake Union line was planned in the 2008 city network as part of a proposed Seattle Center–Downtown Seattle–King Street Station line. Planning on the project, named the Center City Connector, began in 2012 and was approved two years later by the city council to run for 1.2 miles (1.9 km) primarily on 1st Avenue. It would cost $110 million to construct and would carry streetcars at a frequency of five minutes due to an overlap of the two lines. During preliminary construction in late 2017, questions arose about increased costs and potential disruption to downtown businesses. Mayor Jenny Durkan cancelled work on the project in March 2018 and ordered an independent review, which found that construction costs had risen to $200 million due to errors in vehicle procurement and design changes. The streetcar project, later renamed the "Culture Connector", remains unfunded and suspended as of 2023. A report released in January 2024 estimated that the project would take seven years to construct and cost $410 million—a 43 percent increase from the 2018 estimate.

== Route and stations ==
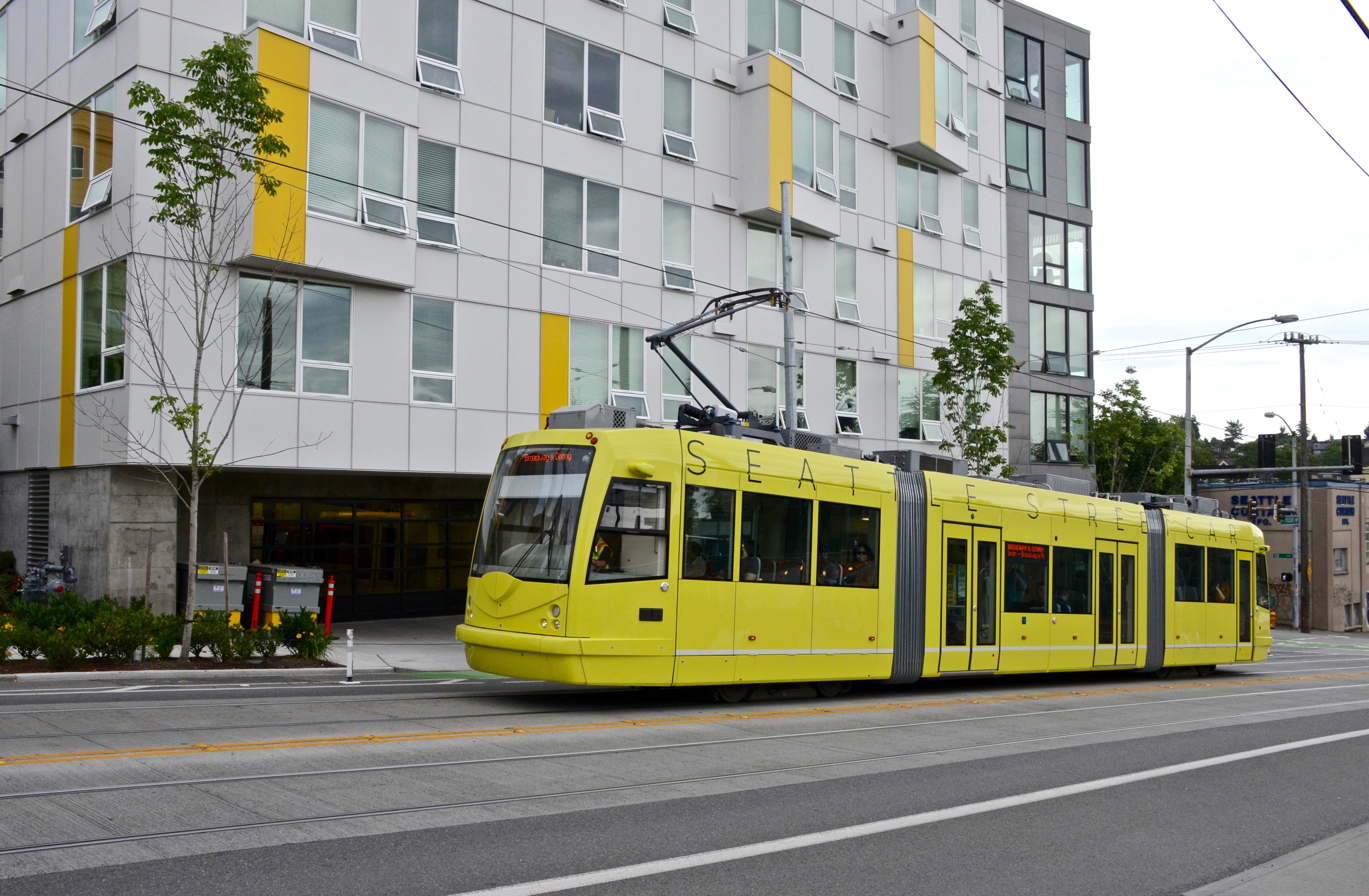
A northbound streetcar traveling west on Yesler Way

The First Hill Streetcar line travels 2.5 miles (4.0 km) from Pioneer Square in Downtown Seattle, east through the International District, and north through Yesler Terrace and First Hill to Capitol Hill, generally following South Jackson Street and Broadway. Trains take approximately 18 minutes to traverse the line from end to end.

The line begins in the median of South Jackson Street at Occidental Avenue in the Pioneer Square historic district, located near the city's waterfront and between Lumen Field and Occidental Park. Streetcars travel east on South Jackson Street, passing the Klondike Gold Rush National Historical Park and King Street Station—the city's intercity rail station—before reaching its second stop at 5th Avenue South. The stop is located at the northeast corner of the International District/Chinatown light rail station and the Union Station office complex. It then continues across the International District and stops at 7th Avenue South near the Wing Luke Museum of the Asian Pacific American Experience.

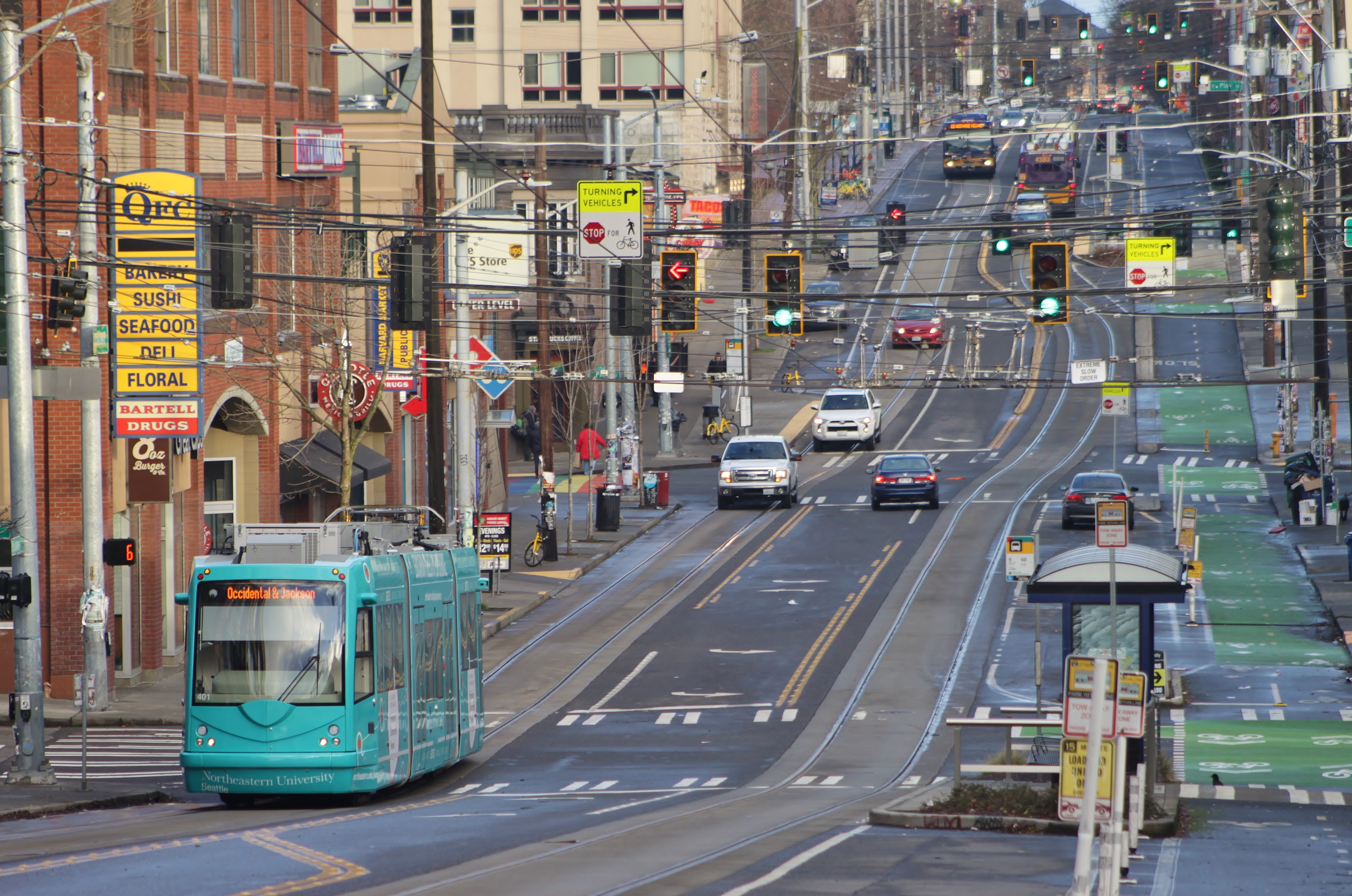
A southbound streetcar on Broadway at Pike Street, with the parallel protected bicycle lane on the right

The streetcar crosses a spur track on 8th Avenue South that leads to the line's operations and maintenance facility and then travels under Interstate 5 into Little Saigon. Trains then stop at a station located east of 12th Avenue South and make a turn north onto 14th Avenue South, stopping at South Washington Street near Bailey Gatzert Elementary School and Wisteria Park. The line turns west onto East Yesler Way and continues around the north side of the elementary school campus, traveling uphill into the expanded Yesler Terrace housing development. The streetcar stops in front of a community center and turns north onto Broadway, which also carries a protected bicycle lane on its east side along with on-street parking spaces.

The streetcar follows Broadway uphill into First Hill, stopping at Terrace Street near the Harborview Medical Center and Marion Street at the Swedish Medical Center on the west side of the Seattle University campus. The line then crosses into Capitol Hill and serves a set of stops between Pike and Pine streets in the center of the city's main nightlife district. Streetcars then pass the Seattle Central College campus and Cal Anderson Park before merging into a single track on the west side of Broadway. The First Hill line terminates at a stop on the south side of East Denny Way, adjacent to the west entrance of the Capitol Hill light rail station.

=== Stations ===
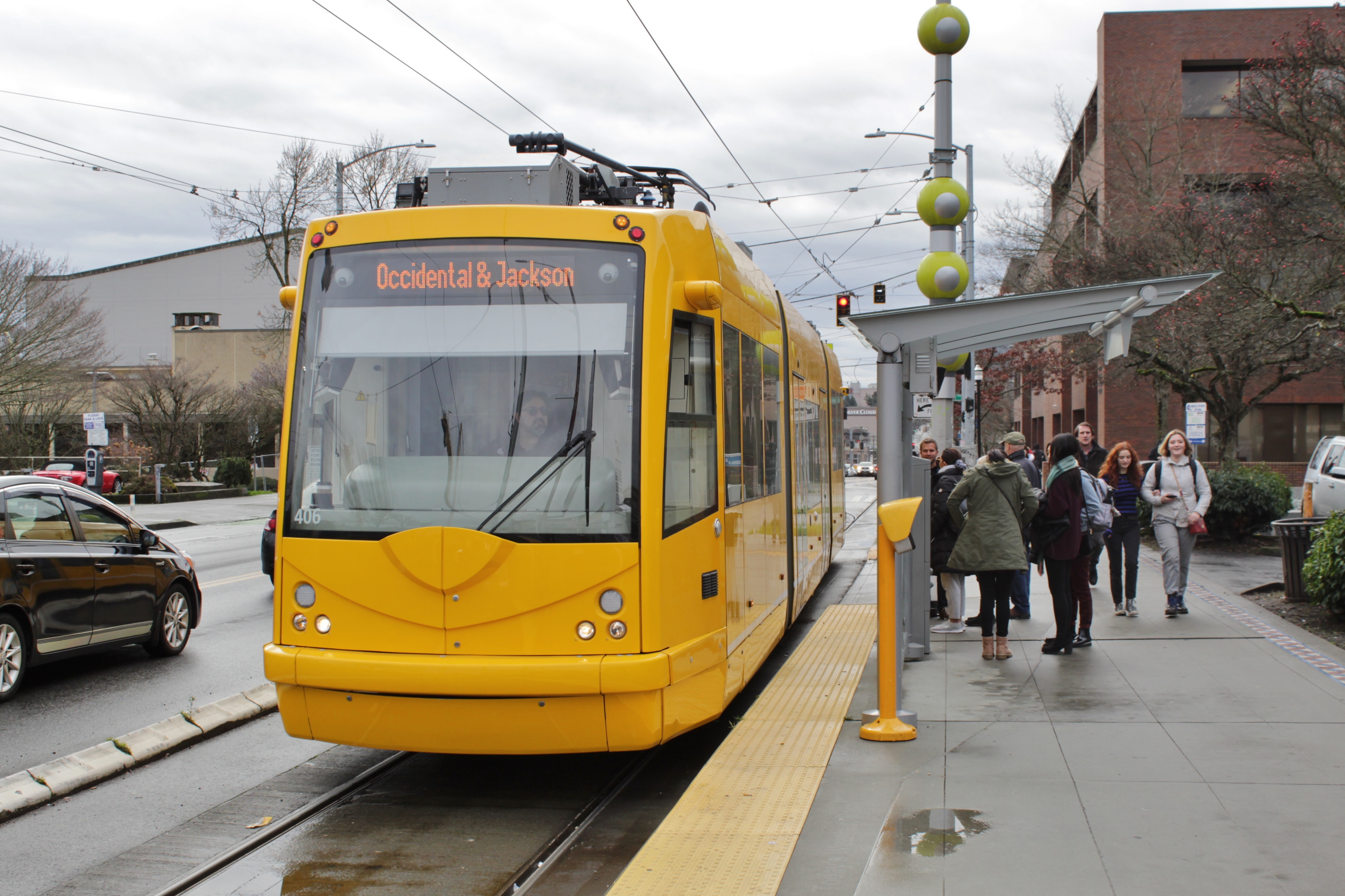
A streetcar at Capitol Hill station

The First Hill line has ten stations that are served by trains in both directions. The Jackson Street stops are primarily center platforms, while the Broadway and Yesler stops use side platforms due to the streets' widths. Each is equipped with a low platform for level boarding that measures 60 to 70 feet (18 to 21 m) long and 10 to 12 feet (3.0 to 3.7 m) wide. The platforms include a basic steel and glass shelter, a digital display with real-time arrivals, wayfinding maps and signs, benches, and leaning rails. Passengers pay for rides using an ORCA card reader or via paper tickets printed at a ticket vending machine on the platform.

List of First Hill Streetcar stations
Station		Type	Neighborhood	Connections and notes
Northbound	Southbound	Type	Neighborhood	Connections and notes
Occidental Mall (Occidental Avenue)		Center	Pioneer Square	Washington State Ferries, King County Water Taxi, Kitsap Fast Ferries; Serves Lumen Field, Klondike Gold Rush National Historical Park
5th & Jackson		Center	Chinatown/International District	International District/Chinatown station: 1 Line; King Street Station: Amtrak, Sounder commuter rail
7th & Jackson		Center	Chinatown/International District	Serves Wing Luke Asian Museum, Kobe Terrace
12th & Jackson		Center	Little Saigon	King County Metro: 7, 14, 36, 60
14th & Washington		Center	Central District	
Yesler & Broadway		Side	Yesler Terrace	King County Metro: 27, 60; Serves Yesler Terrace Community Center
Broadway & Terrace		Side	First Hill	King County Metro: 3, 4, 9 Serves Harborview Medical Center
Broadway & Marion		Side	First Hill	King County Metro: 9, 12, 60; Serves Seattle University and Swedish Medical Center
Broadway & Pine	Broadway & Pike	Side	Capitol Hill	King County Metro: 9, 11, 49, 60; Serves Seattle Central College
Broadway & Denny		Side	Capitol Hill	Capitol Hill station: 1 Line; Serves Cal Anderson Park

== Service and operations ==
Annual ridership
Year	Ridership	%±
2016	840,049	—
2017	882,219	5%
2018	1,159,904	31.5%
2019	1,360,035	17.3%
2020	660,029	-51.5%
2021	698,975	5.9%
2022	937,394	34.1%
2023	1,175,767	25.4%
2024	1,269,768	10%
Source: SDOT

The First Hill Streetcar runs for 20 hours per day from Monday to Saturday, with trains from 5 am to 10:30 pm, and 10 hours per day on Sundays and federal holidays from 10 am to 8 pm. Trains arrive at stations with a scheduled frequency of 12 minutes during weekday rush hours, 15 minutes midday on weekdays and Saturdays, and 20 minutes during the early morning, evenings, Sundays, and holidays. The streetcar carried a total of 1,269,768 passengers in 2024.

The streetcar is owned by the City of Seattle and is currently operated by King County Metro under a contract with the city government. The line's operating budget is primarily covered by a $5 million annual contribution from Sound Transit, with the city government paying other costs. Metro operates bus replacement services in the event of service disruptions.

=== Rolling stock ===
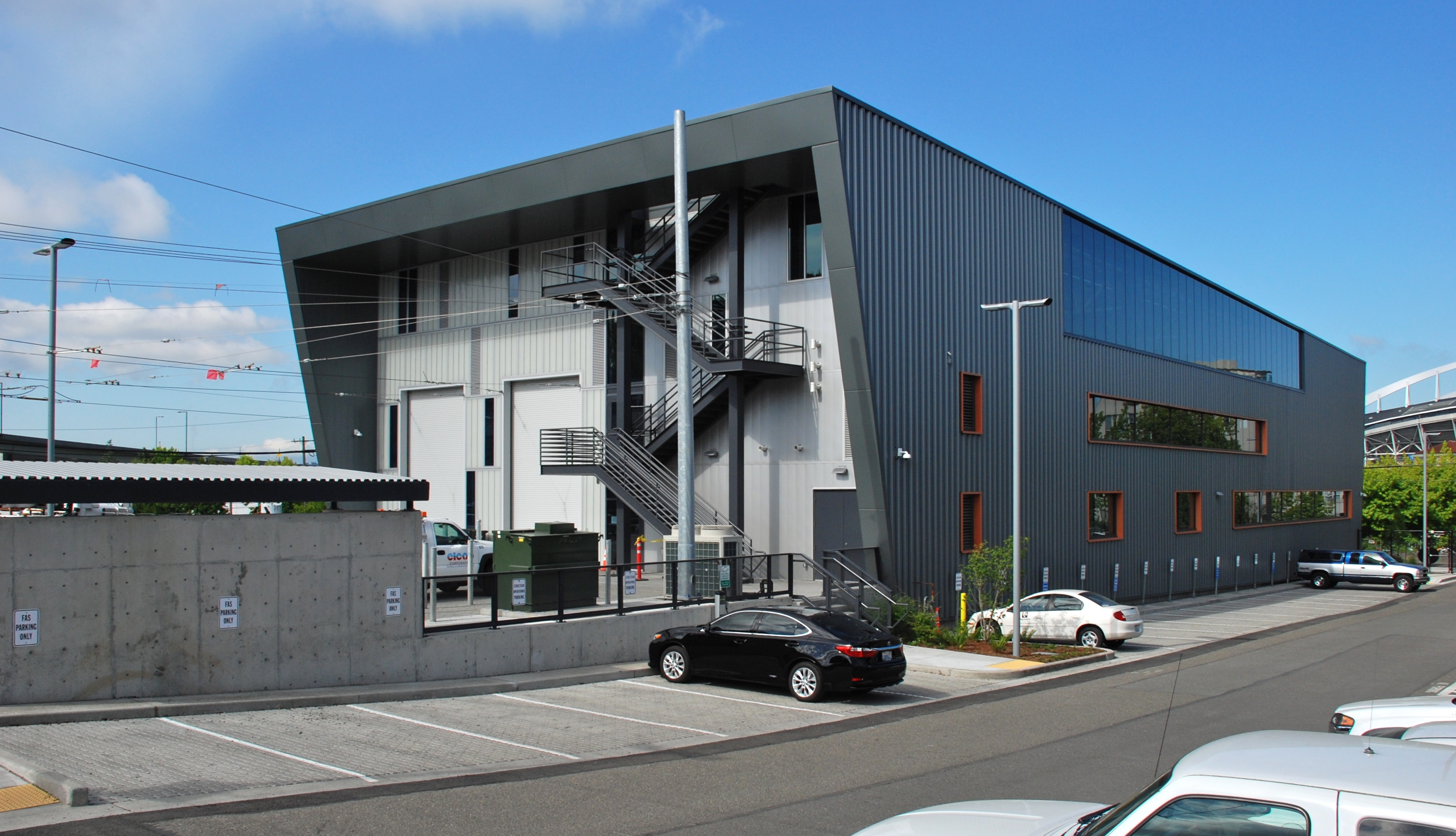
The operations and maintenance facility for the First Hill Streetcar, located in the International District

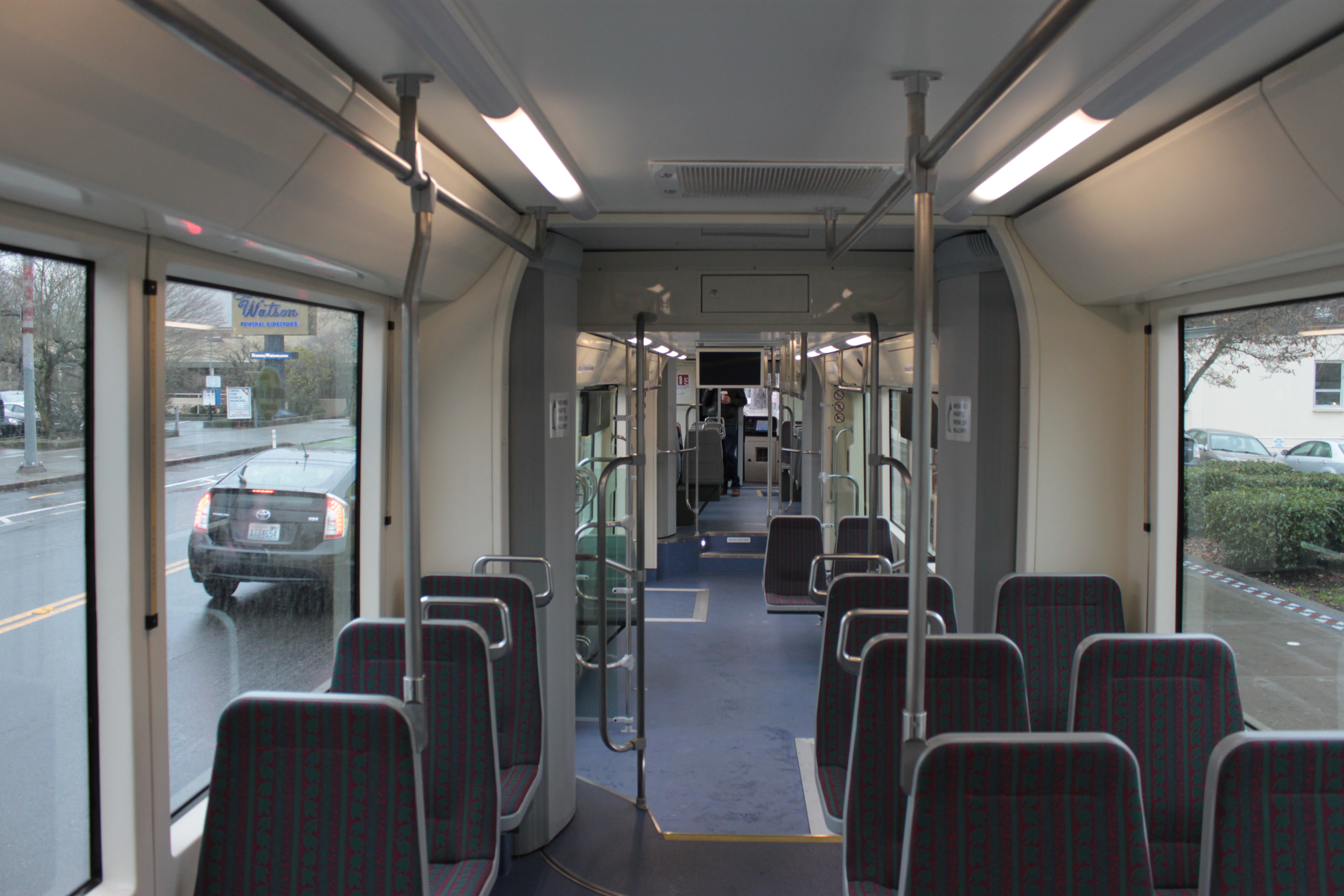
The interior of Streetcar 403

The First Hill Streetcar uses a fleet of six low-floor Inekon 121 Trio streetcars that are maintained and operated by King County Metro. The articulated streetcars measure 66 feet (20 m) long, 8 feet (2.4 m) wide, and have two operator's cabs for bidirectional operations. They each have 30 seats and capacity for 40 additional standing passengers, along with two wheelchair locations; to board wheelchairs and bicycles, a mechanical bridge plate is deployed by the operator from one of two doors in the center section. A third door is located near the operator's cab in the raised section above the truck, which has seating accessed by a stair. A set of digital displays inside the car show upcoming stops, which are also announced by an audio message.

The streetcars, numbered 401 to 407, were built by Czech manufacturer Inekon Trams, who also supplied the vehicles for the South Lake Union line and the Portland Streetcar system. The fleet was manufactured in Ostrava by Inekon and shipped to Seattle for final assembly by Pacifica Marine in 2015, falling significantly behind schedule and delaying the start of service. The streetcars draw their electrical power from overhead catenary that is energized at 750 volts direct current. Unlike the 12 Trio models used for the South Lake Union line, the 121 Trio features an on-board energy storage system that allows streetcars to run off-wire on downhill sections of the route and recharge the battery using regenerative braking. The streetcars are painted in colors to represent neighborhoods on the route, including baby blue for First Hill's hospitals, metallic gold for Pioneer Square's role in the Klondike gold rush, jade green for Little Saigon, hot pink for Capitol Hill, and red and yellow for Chinatown–International District. One of the streetcars includes the names of the constituent ethnic communities in the International District; it was updated in 2025 to add Filipinotown after lobbying from community activists.

The First Hill line requires six streetcars during normal operations, with five in service and one operational spare. An additional vehicle would be required for the North Broadway extension. The streetcars are stored at an operations and maintenance facility within the city's Charles Street Service Center, connected via a spur track on 8th Avenue South. The facility has capacity for seven streetcars, including three within the maintenance shop, and is expandable using outdoor storage tracks. The building was awarded LEED Gold certification for its sustainable construction, including a green roof and solar panels, and also houses administrative offices for the streetcar system.

== See also ==
- South Lake Union Streetcar
- Waterfront Streetcar
