= Streetcars in Seattle =

Streetcars in Seattle may refer to

- Seattle Street Railway - former urban streetcar system in Seattle
- Seattle Streetcar - current urban streetcar system in Seattle
