= Queen Anne Counterbalance =

Former streetcar in Seattle, US

Coordinates: 47°37′40″N 122°21′24″W

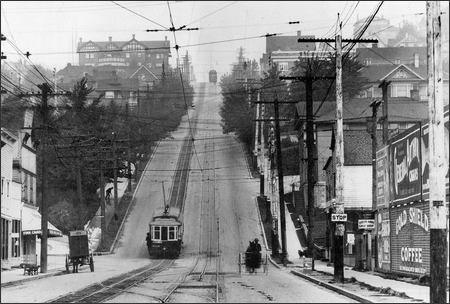
- Queen Anne Counterbalance cars in operation, c. 1910. View is directed north along Queen Anne Ave.

Service
- Operator(s): Seattle Electric Co. (1901–19); Seattle Municipal St Ry. (1919–40)

History
- Opened: 1901; 125 years ago
- Closed: August 11, 1940; 85 years ago

Technical
- Track length: 1,500 ft (460 m) (Comstock to Roy)
- Character: Combination electric & funicular streetcar

The Queen Anne Counterbalance was a funicular streetcar line operated by the Seattle Electric Company, serving the steep slope along its namesake street on Queen Anne Hill in Seattle, Washington, from 1901 to 1940. It replaced an earlier cable car line built by the Front Street Cable Railway in 1891.

== Design ==
Key locations on the West Queen Anne line (Counterbalance section is between the two sheaves.)

The steep hill along Queen Anne Avenue has grades of up to 19 percent between Mercer and Comstock. (Note: Grades along Queen Anne range from 13.8% to 18.7%, reduced to 8–10% across intersecting streets.) The initial cable car service to the top of the hill that was completed in 1891 used a route north via Second Avenue from the existing cable car powerhouse at Denny Way and 2nd, west via Aloha Street to Queen Anne Avenue, then north via Queen Anne to the terminus at Highland Drive. After Seattle Electric Company took over the Front Street Cable Railway in 1900, the line was electrified, rerouted, and combined with the Front Street line as the West Queen Anne line, which ran north/northwest from Pioneer Square (Walker and First Ave S) to Seventh Ave W and W McGraw St via Queen Anne and Galer. Although most of the route was operated using the electric traction motors alone, the Counterbalance portion of the West Queen Anne line used counterweight assistance to ascend and descend approximately half of the route along Queen Anne Avenue; this subsection ran north–south between Roy and Comstock.

The counterbalance that began operation in 1901 used an underground cable that looped around two sheaves each 10 ft (3.05 m) in diameter; the sheaves were at the top (under the intersection with Comstock) and bottom (Roy) of the hill. The surface-running passenger streetcar attached to the upper cable length and ran on tracks at street level. The lower cable length was connected to a rail car counterweight that ran on a parallel set of tracks in an underground tunnel below the surface tracks. A narrow gauge railway (2 ft 6 in or 762 mm) was laid in the tunnel for the counterweight rail car, laden with 16 short tons (14 long tons; 15 t) of concrete and pig iron. When the streetcar ascended or descended, it would be counterbalanced by the descending or ascending rail car. The counterweight rail car was equipped with a spring-loaded safety stop that would automatically stop the car if the cable broke. The timber-lined counterweight tunnel was set at a constant grade of 13.5%, aside from the top and bottom ends, and has a cross-section of 5 ft (1.5 m) wide by 4 ft (1.2 m) tall.

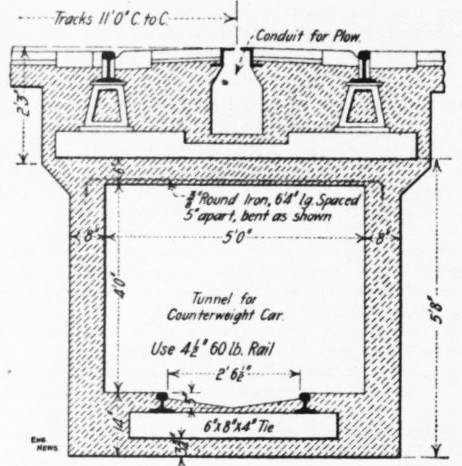
Cross-section of Queen Anne Counterbalance

At the top and bottom of the hill, the streetcar would stop so that attendants stationed in small booths could engage (or disengage) the streetcar from the counterbalance cable and adjust the weight of the counterbalance rail car; the work-intensive attachment and adjustment processes limited minimum headways to 12 minutes. The car connected to a "plow" attached to the upper cable run; the plow was a single plate of steel, 3/4 in (19 mm) thick, which projected a few inches above the center slot. The conductor controlled a cross-bar attached to the streetcar; the bar dropped into a notch cut into the center of the plow.

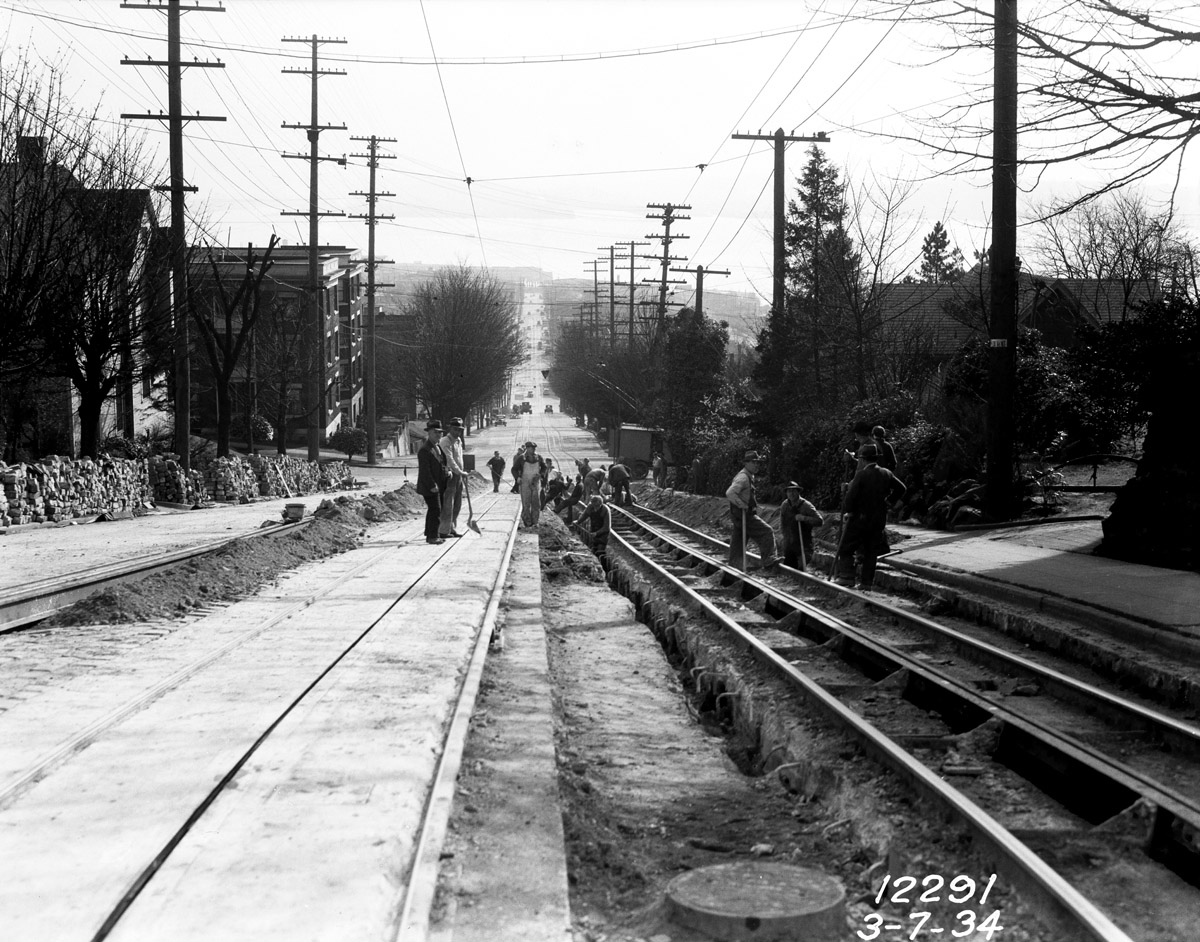
Roadwork in 1934 exposed the tracks and center slot atop the second tunnel of the Counterbalance.

This design was invented by J.P.F. Kuhlmann, a civil engineer in Seattle, and was implemented earlier in that city on Washington Avenue (1891, 16% grade) and on Rainier Avenue (17% grade). Outside of Seattle, the Kuhlmann design also was used on the Front Street route (14% grade) of the City & West Portland Motor Line in Portland, Oregon, the College Hill line (15% grade) of the Union Railroad in Providence, Rhode Island, and the Selby Avenue line (1898, 16% grade) in St. Paul, Minnesota. The Queen Anne Counterbalance had the largest tunnel and counterweight car of all the Kuhlmann systems. A similar underground counterweight system was used for the Balmain Tramway extension, but with horizontal sheaves.

In 1902, a parallel set of tracks were added on the west side of Queen Anne Avenue, with a second underground tunnel and independent counterweight railcar. That year, Seattle Electric Company also purchased ten new streetcars to serve the line, numbered 311 to 320, which were built by the Stephenson Car Company. Most served until service over the line was discontinued in 1940. In 1908, the first tunnel was rebuilt with reinforced concrete supports.

== History ==
Initially, the Front Street Cable Railway (FSCRy) started a cable car franchise in 1889, connecting Pioneer Square and Denny Way via Front Street (now First Avenue) in Seattle. FSCRy extended its line north to Highland Drive via 2nd, Aloha, and Queen Anne under a subsidiary called the North Seattle Cable Railway Company in 1891. Cable cars, as designed for hilly San Francisco, were ideal for the steep northernmost blocks of the extended line.

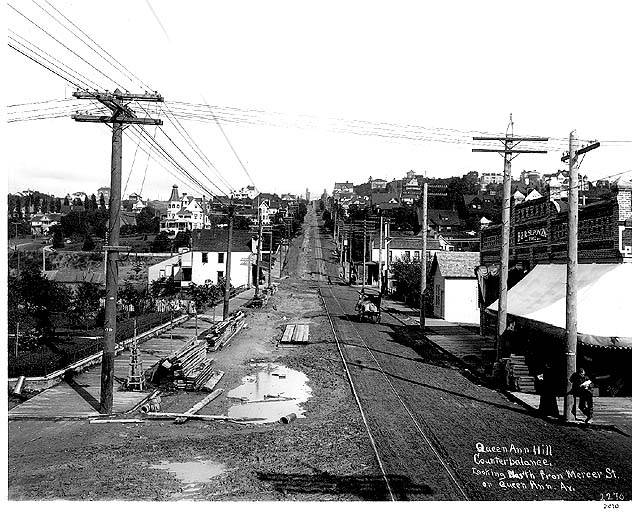
Single-track Counterbalance c. 1901 or 1902, viewed north from Mercer, photographed by Asahel Curtis

The panic of 1893 left the company weak and after going bankrupt in 1898, FSCRy and its franchises were acquired by a division of Stone & Webster, the Seattle Electric Company, in 1900. Seattle Electric promptly started electrifying the cable car lines to reduce operating costs. Due to the extreme grade of the northernmost blocks along Queen Anne (between Mercer and Comstock), electric streetcars would have to rely on a counterbalance system to supplement their motors, leaving it as one of the last cable car lines in Seattle. By early 1901, the Queen Anne Counterbalance began operation with a single track.

In May 1901, Seattle Electric advanced a plan to tunnel beneath Queen Anne Hill to replace the counterbalance, but the idea was unpopular and not pursued further. The first serious mishap occurred less than a week later, after a counterweight cable snapped, releasing the railcar counterweight, which shot downhill and buried itself at the bottom, shutting down operations for two days. By 1903, the street had been paved. Seattle Electric was purchased by the city in 1919 for $15 million (Note: Reportedly, this was three times the actual value, and the resulting debt caused significant political difficulty for Mayors Ole Hanson, Bertha K. Landes, and Frank E. Edwards. Hanson was singled out for ridicule; a grand jury later would find him "guilty of 'stupidity'". The debt was not retired until a federal loan was secured by Mayor Arthur B. Langlie in May 1939.) and the streetcar system, including the Counterbalance, was operated by the city as the Seattle Municipal Street Railway.

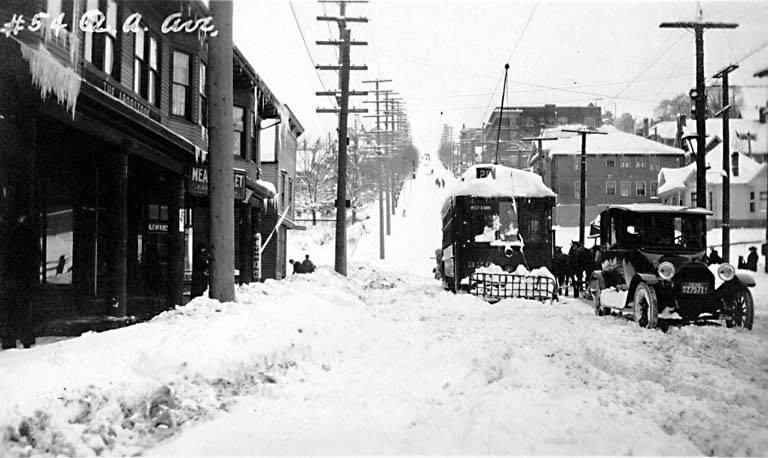
Counterbalance car #320, immobilized by the Big Snow of Feb 2–3, 1916

On March 5, 1937, the Seattle Municipal Street Railway held a race between the Counterbalance and a new trolleybus, powered by a temporary overhead line; the trolleybus, laden with 92 passengers, finished climbing the hill in a minute and a half, well ahead of the streetcar, which finished in just over three minutes despite the latter being given a head start from halfway up the hill. The race was arranged by the engineering firm of John C. Beeler to support its plan to convert the streetcar system to trolleybuses, but voters rejected Proposition A on March 9, 1937, which would have issued $11.6 million in bonds to finance the conversion and settle the remaining debt from the 1919 purchase of Seattle Electric. Eventually, with the help of a federal loan, the city began converting its streetcar system to trolleybuses, and the first "trackless trolley" started revenue service on April 28, 1940.

The West Queen Anne streetcar line finished its final run at approximately 2:30 AM on the morning of August 11, 1940; that run was swamped by a "mob of 70 Queen Anne youths" who took over the streetcar after it was stopped by an improvised barricade of garbage cans at the intersection of Queen Anne and Galer. By that time, the operator had already dealt with grease on the tracks; the youths dispersed the 40 passengers on board by pelting them with rotten fruits and vegetables. Over the next hour, the mob broke all the windows on the streetcar and stripped it of its seats, straps, and light bulbs. 20 were arrested later in connection with the wild scene; the operator asked the court to dismiss the charges just before the trial, scheduled for September 16, was to start.

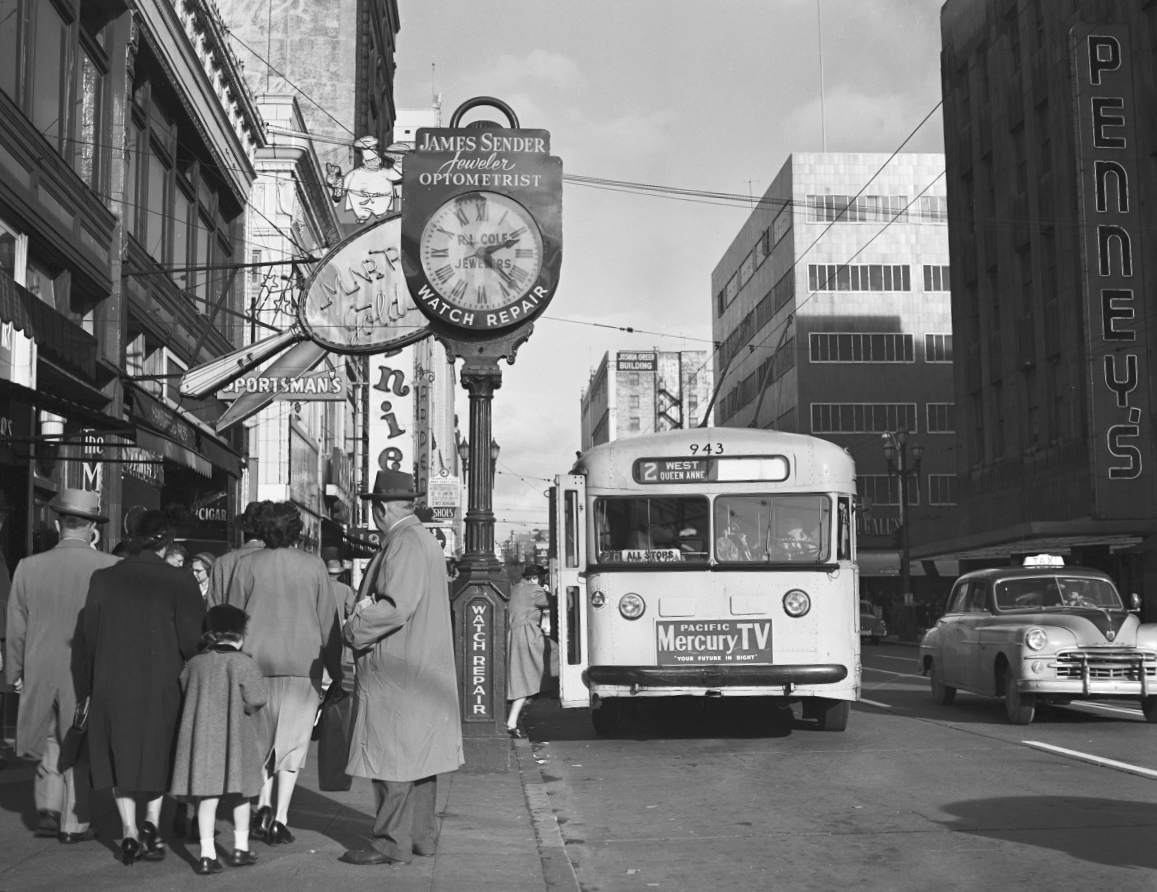
Trolleybus operating Route 2 (West Queen Anne) in downtown Seattle, 1953

A trolleybus line assumed service over Queen Anne starting on September 2, 1940 but the tunnels were retained in case the counterweight railcars were needed to assist the trolleybuses during winter. The surface tracks and cable slots were removed in 1943. The West Queen Anne streetcar line north of Denny Way, including the Counterbalance section, is mostly duplicated by the modern King County Metro trolleybus line operated as Route 2. As of 2019, the underground tunnels and counterweight cars are still present and undisturbed.

== Legacy ==
- The portion of Queen Anne Avenue North and the hill itself on which the cable car counterweight system ran are also known locally as the Counterbalance.
- Several businesses in the neighborhood were named (or renamed) for the Counterbalance.
- The fictional radio psychiatrist Frasier Crane mentioned his residence was "on the Counterbalance" in several episodes, including the Season 1 episode "Can't Buy Me Love" of the eponymous TV series. The view from his condominium was actually taken from nearby Kerry Park.
- When weather conditions are snowy and icy, the City of Seattle closes the Counterbalance route. Social media users post videos of cars that have ignored these signs and attempt to drive up and down the hill.

== See also ==
- Great Incline, a similar contemporaneous line on Mount Lowe near Pasadena (1893–1938)
- Fillmore Counterbalance, a similar contemporaneous line in San Francisco (1895–1941)
