= Counterweight =

Equivalent weight that balances a mechanical system

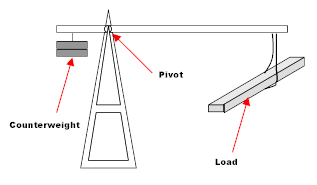
A simple crane

A counterweight is a weight that, by applying an opposite force, provides balance and stability of a mechanical system. The purpose of a counterweight is to make lifting the load faster and more efficient, which saves energy and causes less wear and tear on the lifting machine.

Counterweights are often used in traction lifts (elevators), cranes and funfair rides. In these applications, the expected load multiplied by the distance that load will be spaced from the central support (called the "tipping point") must be equal to the counterweight's mass times its distance from the tipping point in order to prevent over-balancing either side. This distance times mass is called the load moment.

By extension, a counterbalance force balances or offsets another force, as when two objects of equal weight, power, or influence are acting in opposition to each other.

== Examples ==
Trebuchet
There are five major components of a trebuchet: beam, counterweight, frame, guide chute, and sling. After the counterweight drops from a platform on the frame, gravity pulls the counterweight and pivots the beam. Without the counterweight, the beam could not complete the arc that allows the sling to accurately release the projectile.

Crankshaft
A counterweight is also used in many rotating systems to reduce vibrations due to imbalances in the rotating assembly. A typical example is counterweights on crankshafts in piston engines.

Desk lamp
Some balanced arm lamps work with a counterweight to keep the arm and lamp in the desired position.

Counterweights in architecture

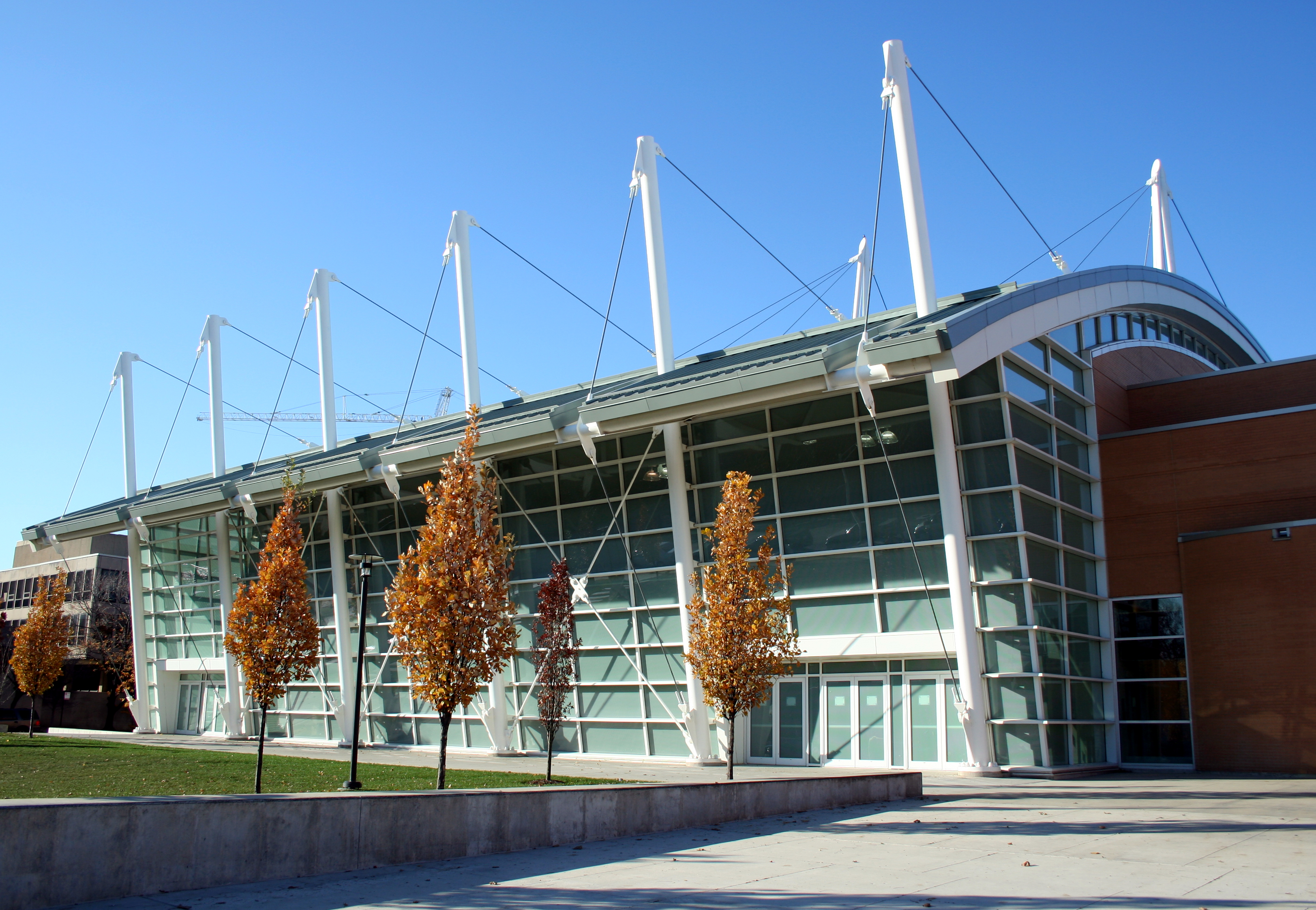
César Pelli's Ratner Athletic Center uses cables, masts and underground counterweights as a load-bearing support structure.

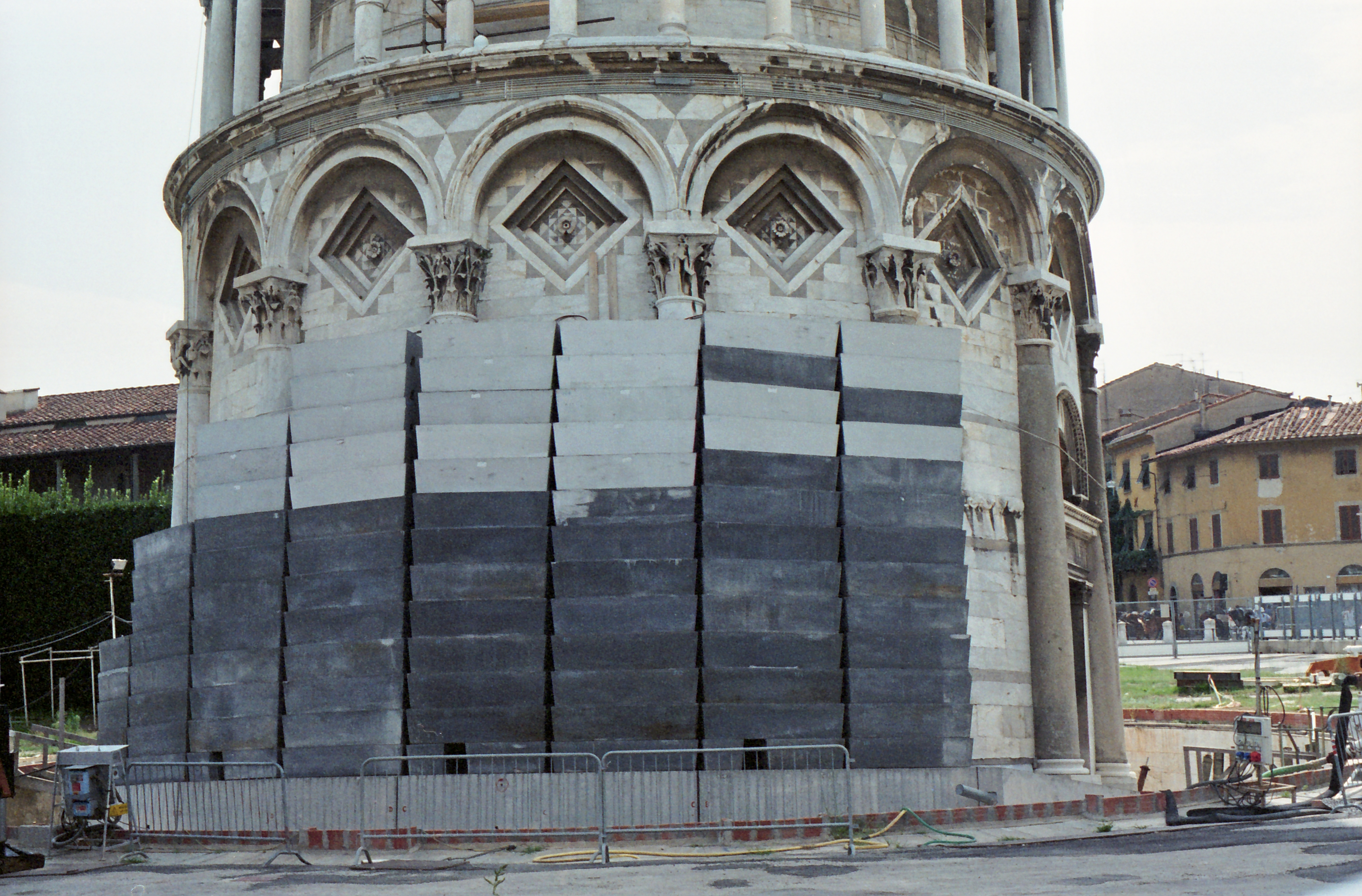
Leaning Tower of Pisa has used external counterweights to stabilize the once gradually falling structure.

Elevator
In traction (non-hydraulic) elevators, a heavy counterweight counterbalances the load of the elevator carriage, so the motor lifts much less of the carriage's weight (specifically, the counterweight is the weight of the carriage plus 40-50% of its rated capacity). The counterweight also increases the ascending acceleration force and decreases the descending acceleration force to reduce the amount of power needed by the motor. The elevator carriage and the counterweights both have wheels that roll on rails to prevent irregular movement and provide a smoother ride for the passengers.

Space elevator with counterweight at top

Space elevator
a proposed structure designed to transport material from a celestial body's surface into space. Many variants have been proposed, but the concept most often refers to an elevator that reaches from the surface of the Earth to geostationary outer space, with a counterweight attached at its outer end. By attaching a counterweight at the end, upward centrifugal force from the Earth's rotation ensures that the cable remains stretched taut, countering the gravitational pull on the lower sections and thereby allowing the elevator to remain upright. The counterweight itself could assume one of several forms:

1. a heavy, captured asteroid;
2. a space dock, space station or spaceport positioned past geostationary orbit; or
3. an extension of the cable itself far beyond geostationary orbit.

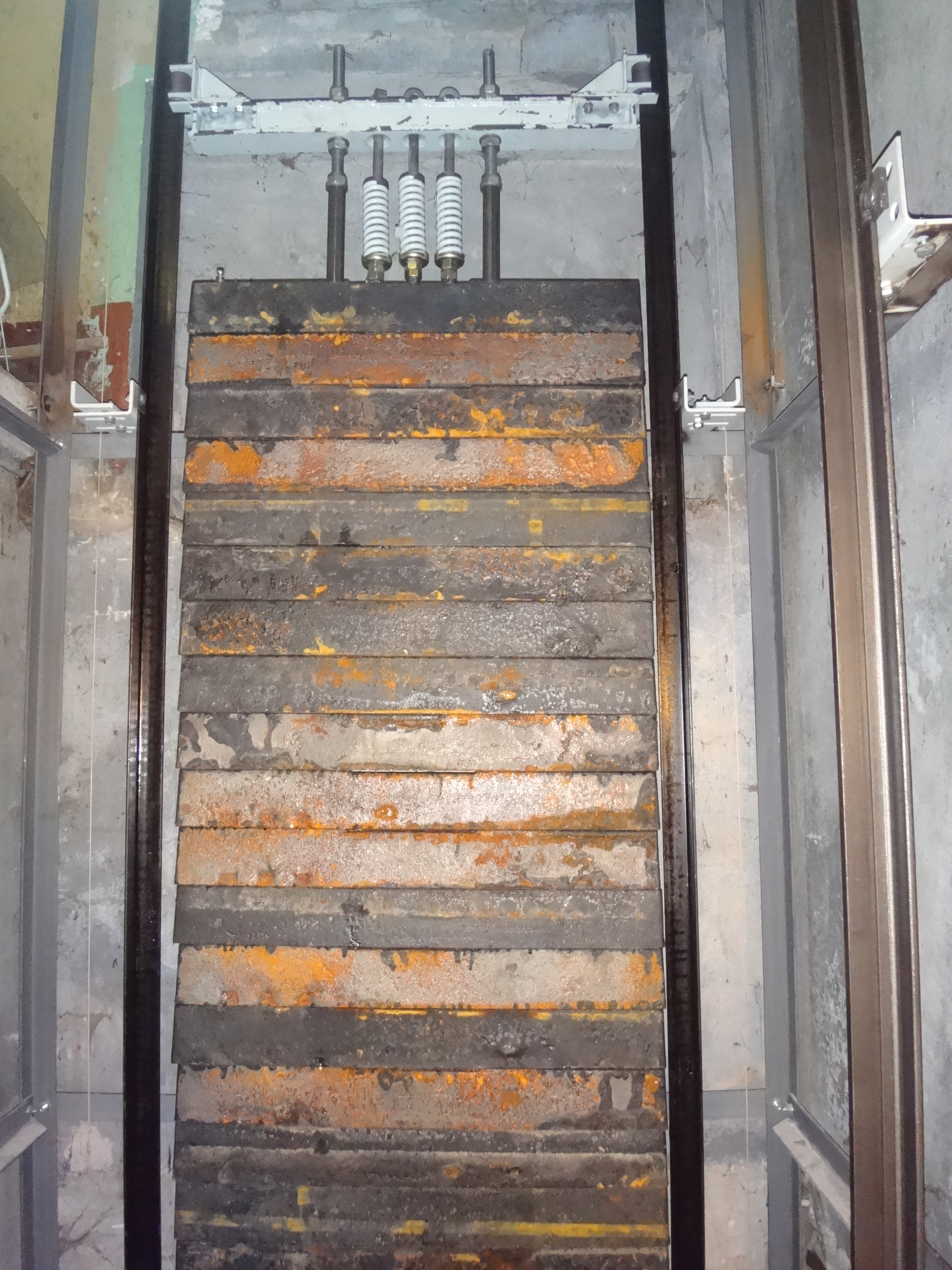
Counterweight of elevator

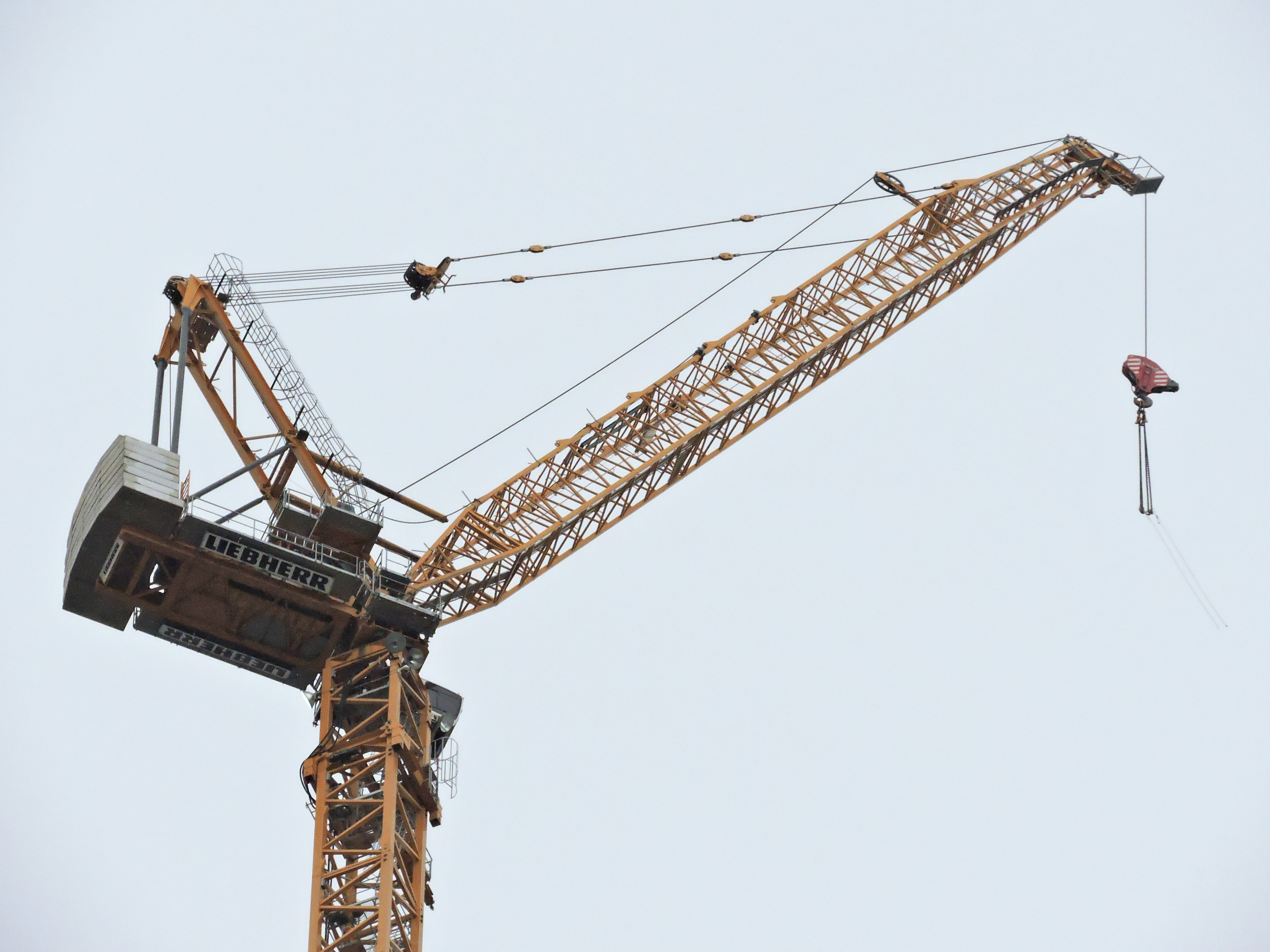
Concrete counterweights on a tower crane

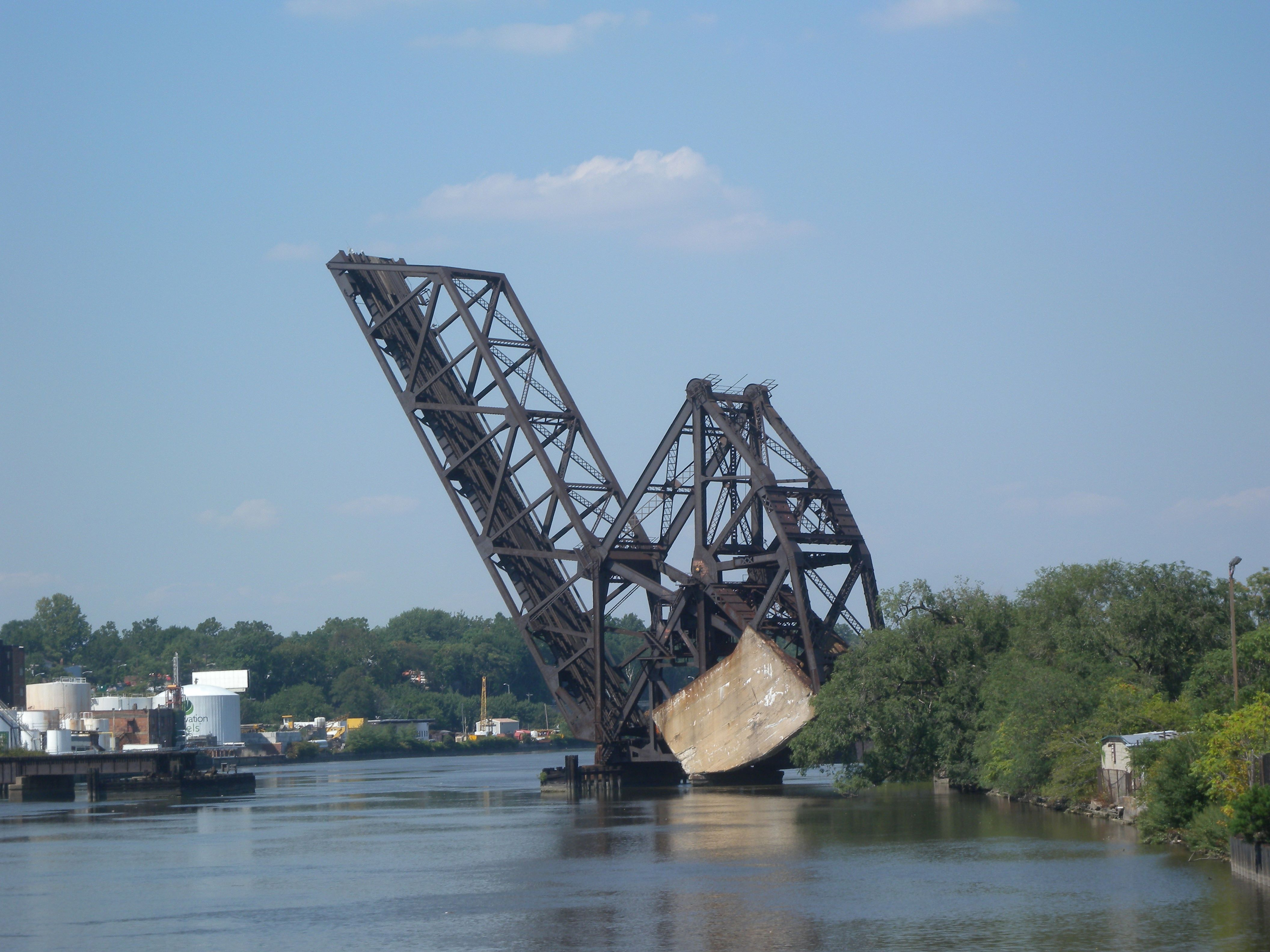
Bascule bridge with concrete counterweight

Metronome: A wind-up mechanical metronome has an adjustable weight and spring mechanism that allows the speed to be adjusted by placement of the weight on the spindle. The tempo speed is decreased by moving the weight to a higher spindle marking or increased by moving it to a lower marking.

Crane
The tower crane (see picture) is a modern form of balance crane that is fixed to the ground. A horizontal boom is balanced asymmetrically across the top of the tower. The long arm carries the lifting gear. The short arm is called the machinery arm; this holds the motors and electronics to operate the crane, as well as the concrete counterweights.

Other examples include:

- Vertical-lift bridge
- Drawbridge
- Bascule bridge
- Forklift

== See also ==
- Queen Anne Counterbalance
- Water balance propulsion
