= Spare ratio =

A spare ratio or spares ratio is the percentage of unused vehicles operated by a public transport operator during peak service periods. It is calculated as a simple percentage of the peak vehicle requirement.

The peak vehicle requirement, or VOMS (Vehicles Operating in Maximum Service) is the maximum number of vehicles required to operate simultaneously during a typical week, to deliver regularly-scheduled transit services. Maximum fleet utilisation typically occurs at morning or afternoon weekday peak hours.

Spare Ratio = [Total Fleet Size minus Peak Vehicle Requirement] divided by Peak Vehicle Requirement, x 100%

There are other alternative expressions:

- Spare ratio = [Total Active Fleet - VOMS] / VOMS
- Spare ratio = Spare Vehicles ÷ VOMS

In the United States, the Federal Transit Administration (FTA) sets a 20 percent guideline for the spare ratio in a fleet of at least 50 vehicles.
