= Wisteria Park =

Park in Seattle, Washington, U.S.

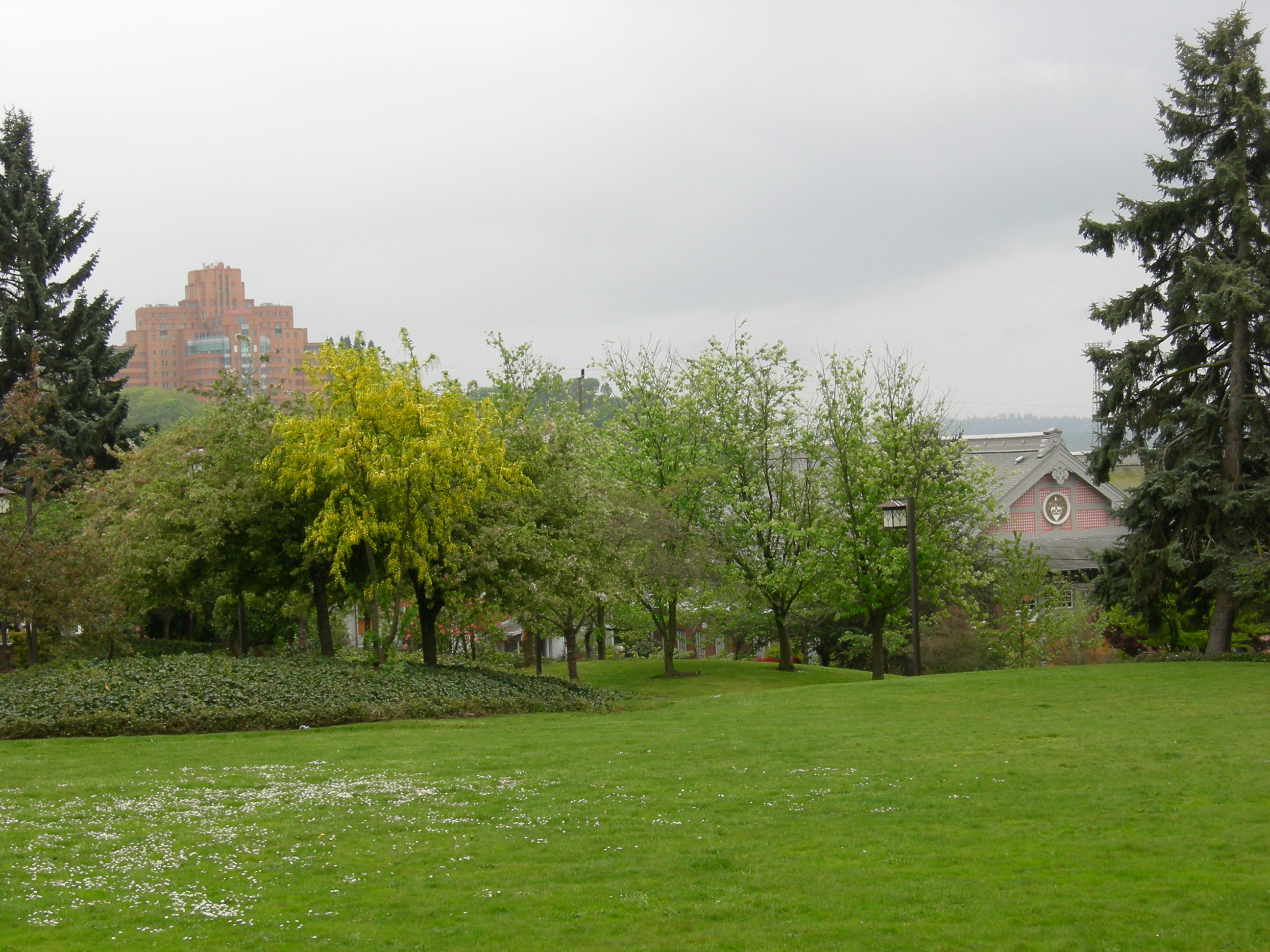
- The park in 2007
- Interactive map of Wisteria Park
- Location: Central District, Seattle, Washington, U.S.
- Coordinates: 47.600°N 122.312°W

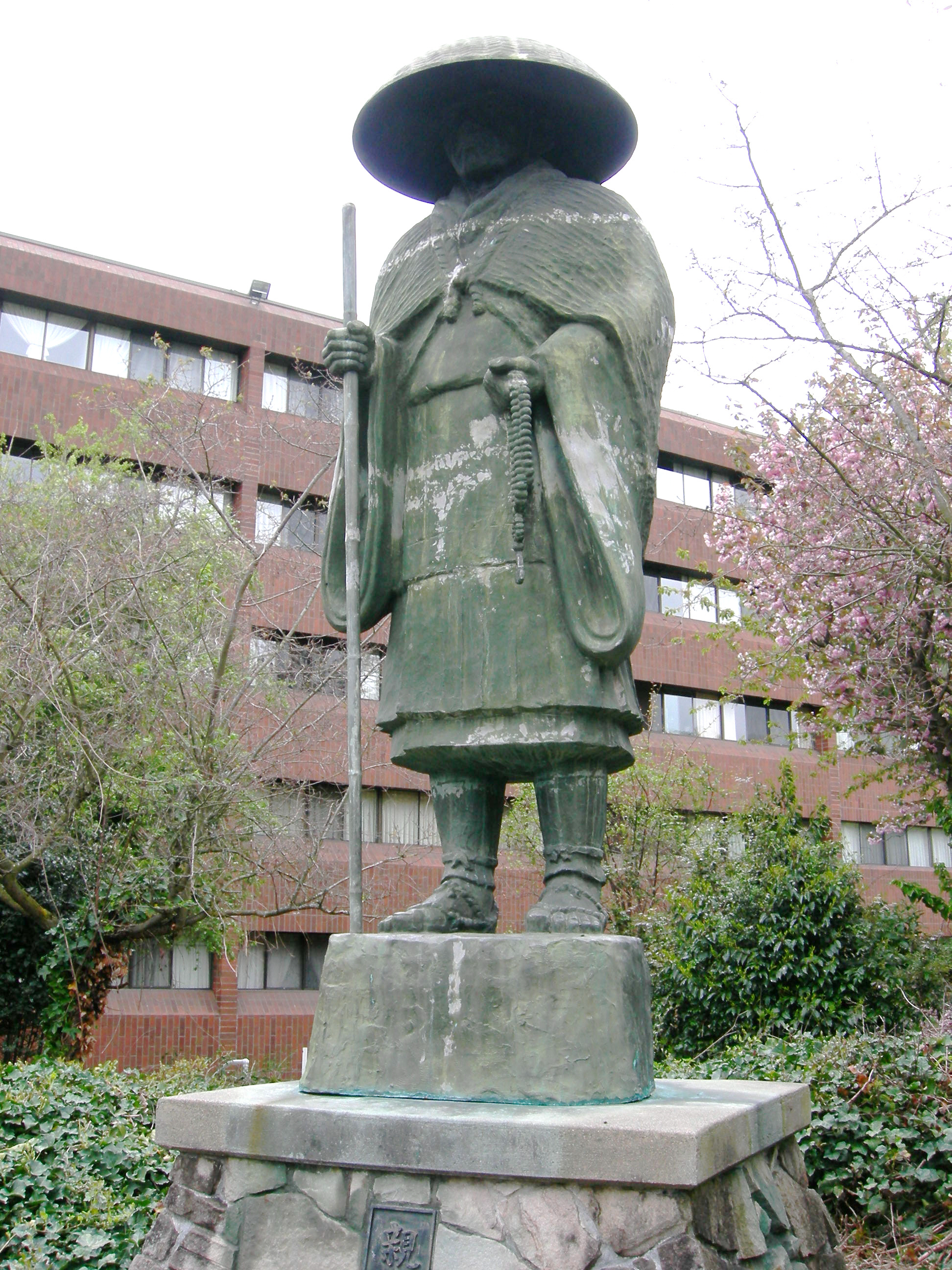
A statue of Shinran (pictured in 2007) is installed in the park.

Wisteria Park (formerly Collins Playfield) is a park in Seattle's Central District, in the U.S. state of Washington. The private parkland is across from the Seattle Betsuin Buddhist Temple and has a bonsho (temple bell).

In 2019, the Japanese American Community organized Lights for Liberty at the park.
