= Seattle Municipal Street Railway =

Historic transit system in Seattle, Washington, U.S.

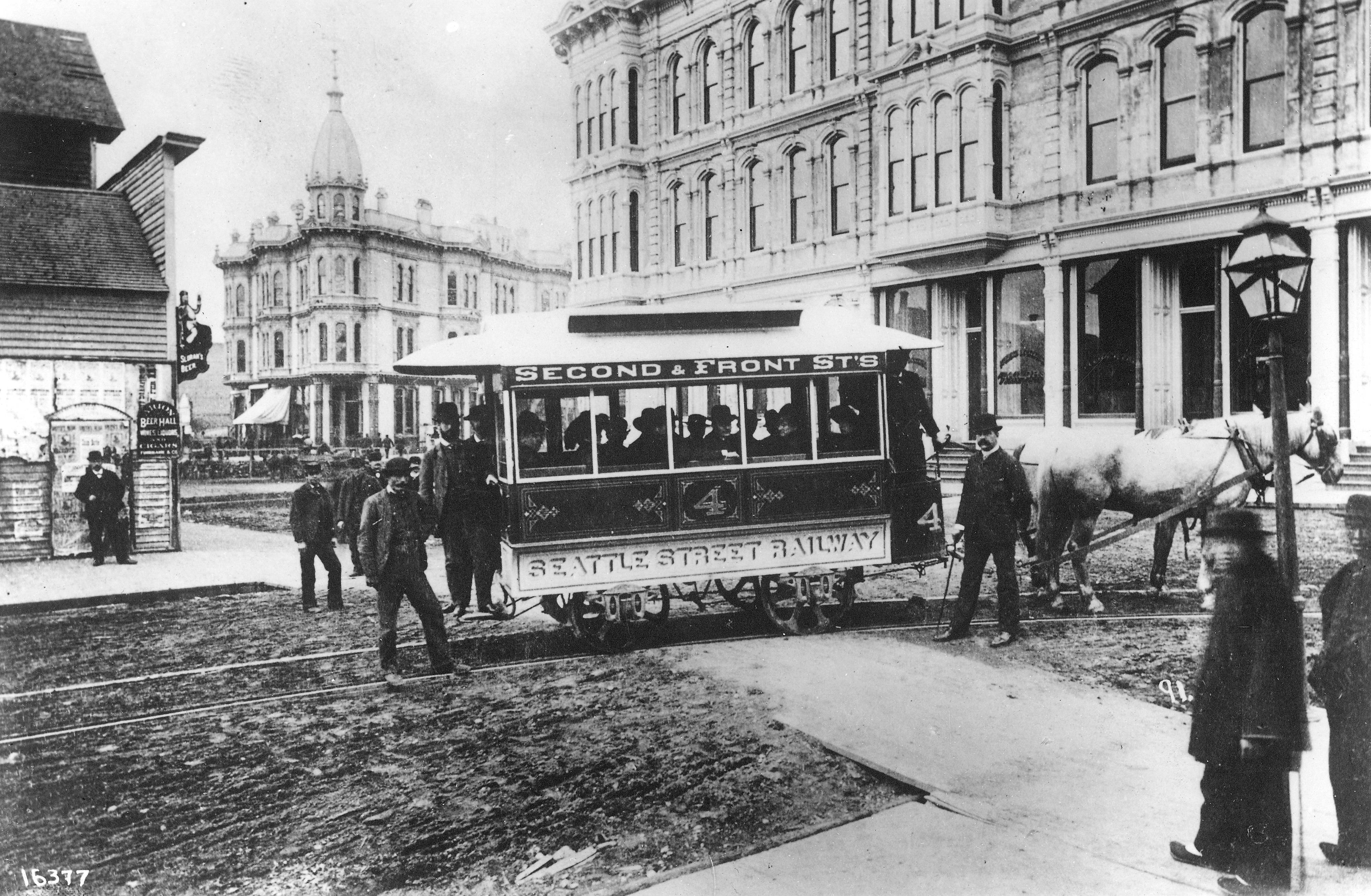
- Seattle Street Railway's first streetcar at Occidental Avenue and Yesler Way with Mayor John Leary and city officials in the fall of 1884

Operation
- Locale: Seattle, Washington

Statistics
Horse-drawn era: 1884–1889
- Owner: Various (1884–1889)
- Operator: Various (1884–1889)
- Propulsion system: Horse
Cable car era: 1888–1940
- Owners: Various (1888–1919); Seattle Municipal Street Railway (1919–1940)
- Operators: Various (1888–1919); Seattle Municipal Street Railway (1919–1940)
- Propulsion system: Cable
Electric streetcar era: 1889–1941
- Lines: 26 streetcar lines (1936)
- Owners: Various (1889–1919); Seattle Municipal Street Railway (1919–1941)
- Operators: Various (1889–1919); Seattle Municipal Street Railway (1919–1941)
- Track length (total): 231 miles (372 km) (1936)

The Seattle Municipal Street Railway was a city-owned streetcar network that served the city of Seattle, Washington and its suburban neighborhoods from 1919 to 1941. It was a successor to the horse-drawn Seattle Street Railway established in 1884, and immediate successor to the Puget Sound Traction, Power and Light Company's Seattle division.

== History ==
=== Origins and consolidation ===
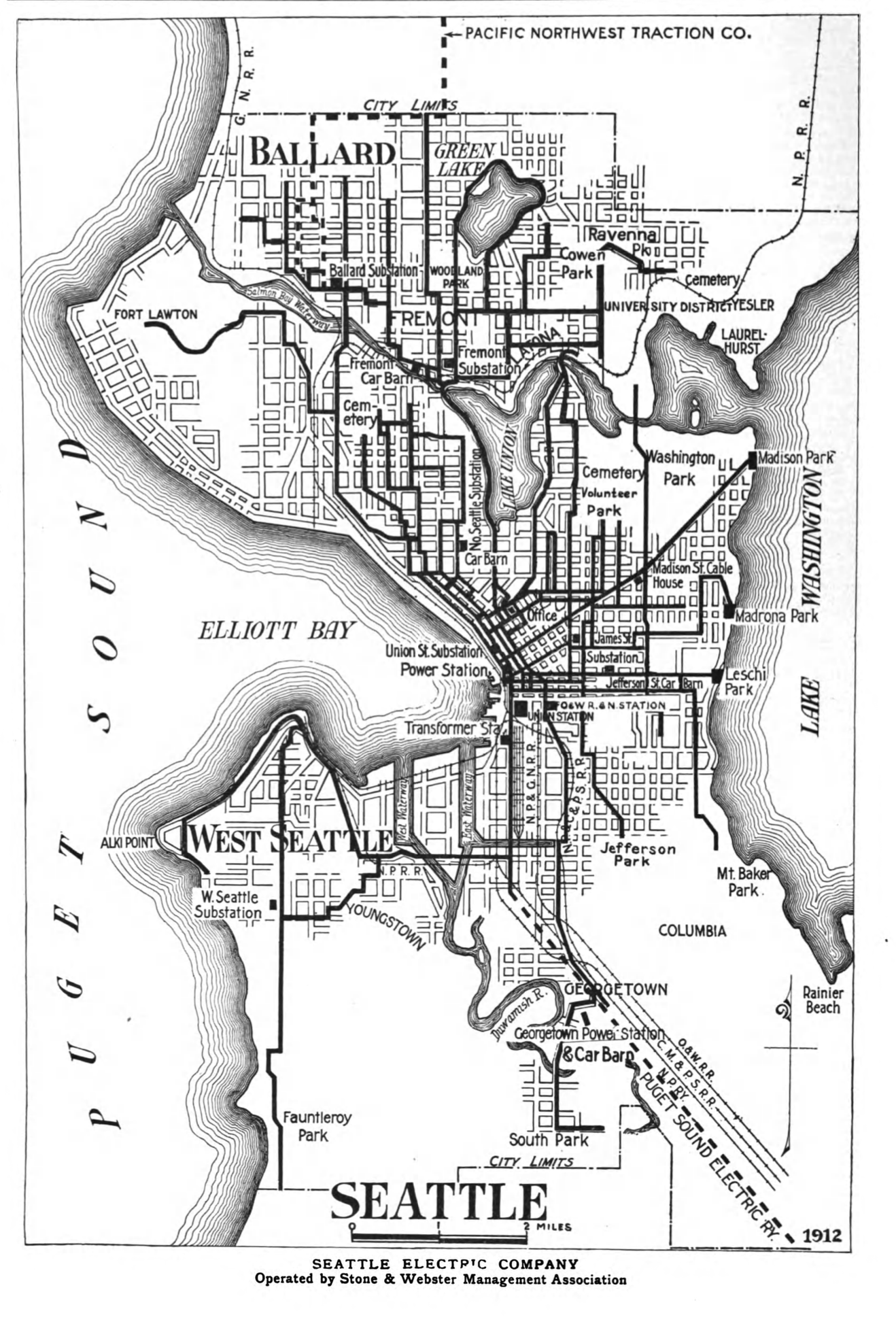
Map of Seattle Electric Company c. 1912

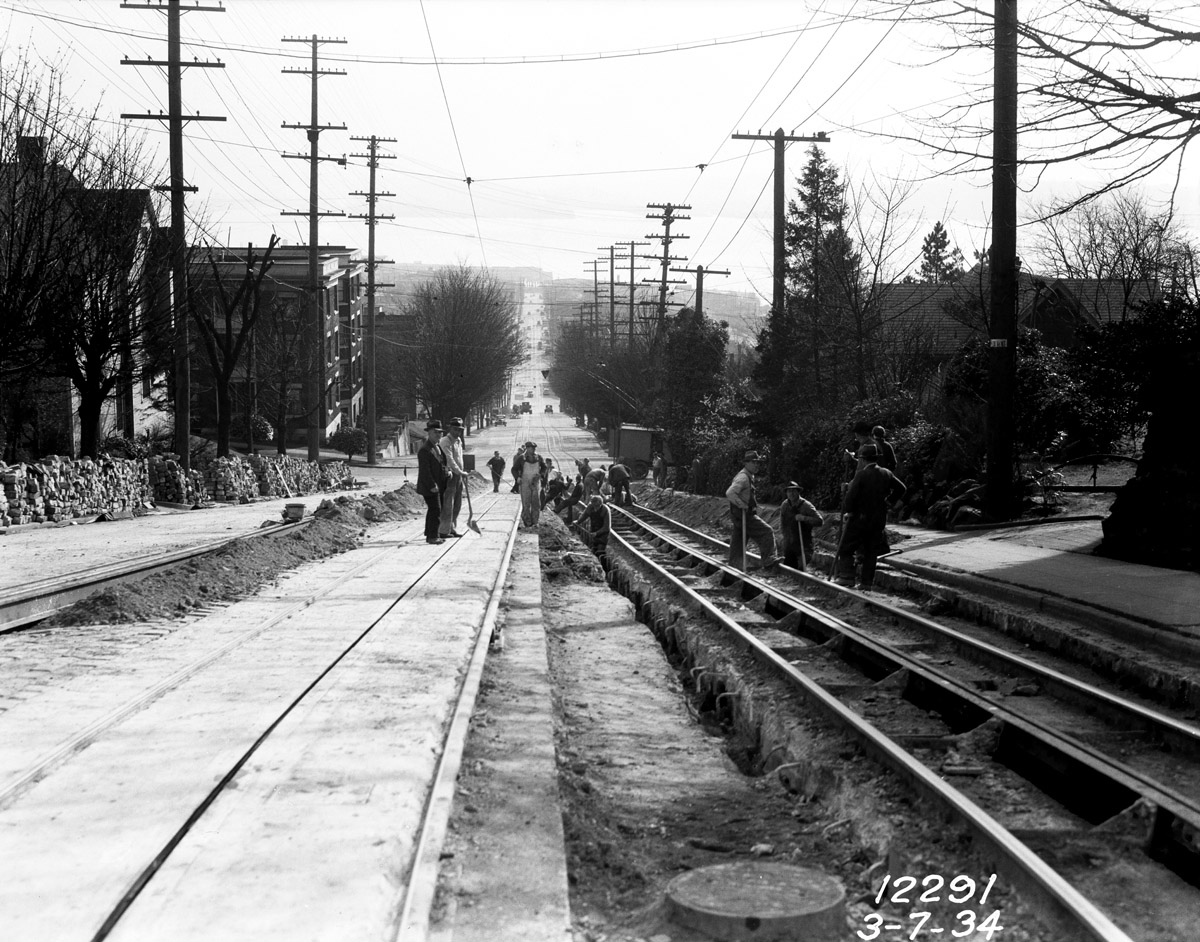
Roadwork in 1934 exposed the tracks and center slot atop the second tunnel of the Counterbalance

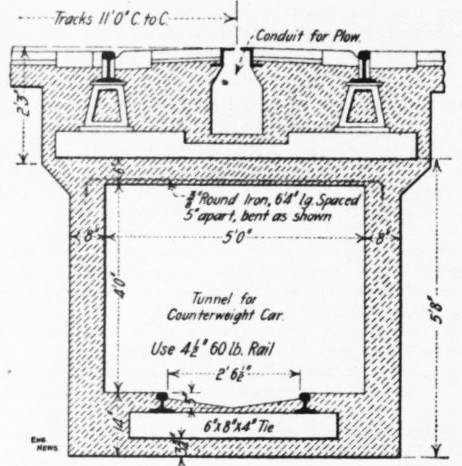
Cross-section of Queen Anne Counterbalance

The first streetcars in Seattle were operated by Frank Osgood as the Seattle Street Railway, which ran horsecars starting from September 23, 1884. Osgood went on to convert the horsecars to electric traction as the Seattle Electric Railway and Power Company, beginning with a test on March 30, 1889 and followed by regular service the next day. By 1891, Seattle had 78 mi (126 km) of street railway tracks, of which 70 mi (110 km) had been built since 1889.

Seattle railway systems (1891)
Name	Image	Length			Type	Operation started	Notes
Name	Image	Single	Double	Total	Type	Operation started	Notes
Seattle City Railway		5 mi (8.0 km)	—	5 mi (8.0 km)	Cable	Oct 1888	Originally named the Lake Washington Cable Railway. Started from Yesler & Fruit at Pioneer Place, ran east via Yesler to power house at Lake Washington; one turntable at each end.
Front Street Cable Railway		—	2 3/4 mi (4.4 km)	5 1/2 mi (8.9 km)	Cable	Mar 13, 1889	Ran north from Pioneer Square along Front and Second.
Madison Street Cable Railway		—	3 5/8 mi (5.8 km)	7 1/4 mi (11.7 km)	Cable	Apr 6, 1890	Ran east to Lake Washington, parallel to Yesler.
West Seattle Cable Railway		2 1/4 mi (3.6 km)	—	2 1/4 mi (3.6 km)	Cable	Sep 13, 1890	Ran north from the West Seattle ferry slip.
Union Trunk Line		—	3/4 mi (1.2 km)	1 1/2 mi (2.4 km)	Cable	Mar 19, 1891	
Union Trunk Line		5 3/4 mi (9.3 km)	1/2 mi (0.80 km)	6 3/4 mi (10.9 km)	Electric	Aug 10, 1891	Included three-block counterbalance operation, using a loaded narrow-gauge car running underground.
Seattle Consolidated Railway		2 1/2 mi (4.0 km)	10 mi (16 km)	22 1/2 mi (36.2 km)	Electric	Apr 7, 1889	Formerly Seattle Street Railway Company; consolidated with the West Street and Lake Union Railway as the Seattle Electric Railway in 1889. Reorganized as Consolidated Street Railway in April 1891.
Green Lake Electric Railway		4 1/2 mi (7.2 km)	—	4 1/2 mi (7.2 km)	Electric	Apr 1, 1890	Feeder to Consolidated. Ran north from Fremont to Green Lake.
Rainier Power & Railway		3 1/2 mi (5.6 km)	—	3 1/2 mi (5.6 km)	Electric	Jul 23, 1891	Feeder to Consolidated. Ran east from Lake Union to Brooklyn suburb.
Woodland Park Electric Railway		1 1/4 mi (2.0 km)	—	1 1/4 mi (2.0 km)	Electric	Jul 25, 1891	Feeder to Consolidated. Built and operated by Woodland Park owner Guy C. Phinney.
West Street & North End Railway		3 1/2 mi (5.6 km)	2 1/2 mi (4.0 km)	8 1/2 mi (13.7 km)	Electric	Jan 16, 1891	Initially drew power from Consolidated until powerhouse was completed in Jan 1891. Ran along West Street, then northeast to Ballard.
Rainier Avenue Electric Railway		7 mi (11 km)	—	7 mi (11 km)	Electric	Apr 6, 1890	Ran east to Lake Washington, parallel to Yesler.
South Seattle Cable Railway		2 1/2 mi (4.0 km)	—	2 1/2 mi (4.0 km)	Cable	Jul 3, 1891	Test cars operated in 1890 to hold the franchise; planned conversion to electric.

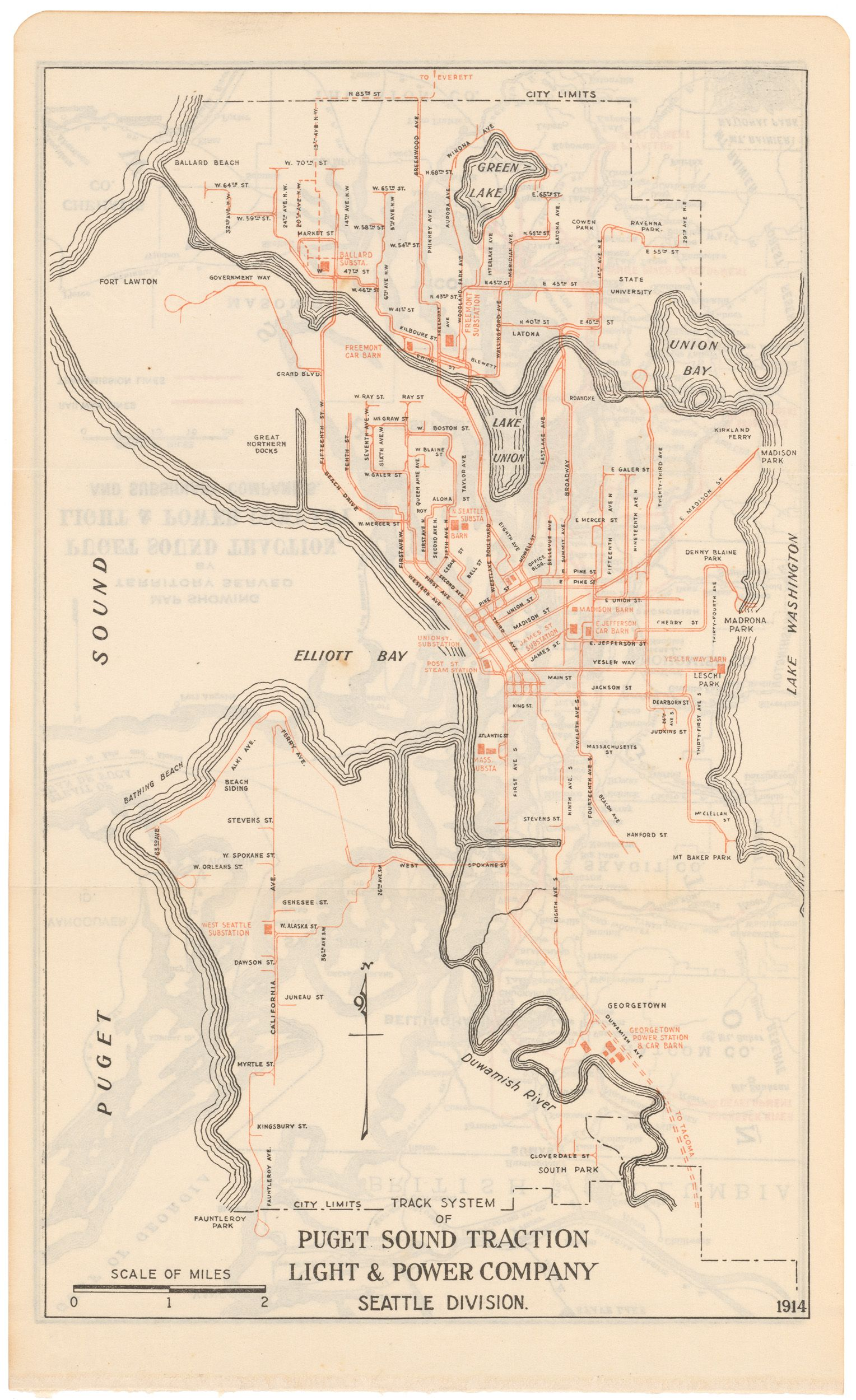
Map of the Puget Sound Traction, Power & Light Company's Seattle division in 1914, five years before taken over by the Seattle Municipal Street Railway

In 1898, Stone & Webster began assembling a transit system by consolidating several smaller streetcar lines, including the Seattle Electric Railway. By 1900, Stone & Webster had amalgamated 22 lines and gained a 40-year operating franchise under a new power and transport utility named the Seattle Electric Company. The system also included cable car lines on Madison Street and Yesler Way. By the end of 1900, the City Council, under public pressure, forced Seattle Electric to provide free transfers between lines, and reduced their lease to 35-years. In 1907, Stone & Webster also acquired the lease to the Everett streetcar system, and in 1912 it combined all of its transit and utility holdings in the area under a new company, the Puget Sound Traction, Power and Light Company (PSTP&L).

=== Municipal acquisition ===
The City of Seattle entered into direct competition with Seattle Electric by furnishing electricity in 1905 after completing the Seattle Municipal Light and Power Plant. As Seattle Electric was distinctly unpopular with the citizens of Seattle and prevented by a state mandate, several requests for fare increases from the existing 5 cents were denied; meanwhile, there was an increasing need to transport tens of thousands of workers responding to the demand for ships resulting from World War I. High shipworker wages and the lack of fare increases meant that by early summer 1918, approximately 1/5 of Seattle Electric's cars were idle because they could not pay operators enough. In September 1918, PSTP&L agreed to sell its lines to the city, and several months of increasingly acrimonious negotiations followed.

On March 31, 1919, the city of Seattle purchased the entire Seattle division of PSTP&L's street railways but the price of the acquisition, US$15,000,000 (equivalent to $278,600,000 in 2025), left the transit operation with an immense debt and an immediate need to raise fares, which hurt ridership. By 1936, the city still owed half the principal on the 1918 bonds used to purchase the system, and was faced with a $4 million operating deficit.

In 1939, a new transportation agency, the Seattle Transit System, was formed, which refinanced the remaining debt and began replacing equipment with "trackless trolleys" (as then known) and motor buses. Yesler Way's cable car operation closed out that mode of service with a final run on August 9, 1940. The last streetcar ran on April 13, 1941.

=== Revival ===
A modern streetcar system debuted in 2007, with the introduction of the South Lake Union Streetcar. A second line, the First Hill Streetcar, opened in 2016. Further expansion plans were shelved in 2018 and remained unfunded as of 2024.

== Legacy ==
- In 1973, Seattle Transit was absorbed by the Municipality of Metropolitan Seattle (which later was replaced by King County Metro).
- After selling its streetcar lines, PSTP&L eventually became Puget Sound Energy.

== See also ==
- Highland Park and Lake Burien Railway
- Queen Anne Counterbalance
