= List of people from Seattle =

List of Seattle people

Seattleites are people who are from or are residents of the city of Seattle. This is a list of well-known people who lived and currently live in the city of Seattle.

== Lived in Seattle ==
=== Athletics ===
- Seyi Adekoya – soccer player
- Darby Allin – professional wrestler
- Reed Baker-Whiting – soccer player
- Josh Barnett – MMA fighter, former Ultimate Fighting Championship heavyweight champion
- Peter Baum – lacrosse player
- Carl Bennett – soccer player
- Samad Bounthong – soccer player
- Jim Brazeau – soccer player and coach
- Larry Brown -–runner and Olympic athlete
- Leo Burney – soccer player
- Handwalla Bwana – soccer player who represented the Somalia national team
- Jerry Cameron – soccer player
- Fred Couples – golfer
- Jamal Crawford – basketball player
- Gail Devers – track and field athlete, Olympic track-and-field gold medalist
- Joan Dunlap-Seivold – soccer player
- Tom Gorman – tennis player
- Marcus Hahnemann – soccer player
- Nevin Harrison – canoer, Olympic Canoe Sprint gold medalist
- Ryder Jones – baseball player
- B. J. Johnson – swimmer
- Matthew King – Olympic swimmer
- Kimber Lee – wrestler
- Jaden McDaniels – NBA player
- Dejounte Murray – basketball player for the Atlanta Hawks
- Gray Newell – race car driver
- Katelyn Ohashi – gymnast for UCLA, multi time awardee for the US
- Apolo Ohno – world champion and Olympic gold-medalist short track speed skater
- John Olerud – baseball player who played at Washington State University
- Lora Ottenad – bodybuilder
- Paul Renkert – soccer player
- JR Ritchie – baseball player
- Nate Robinson – NBA player, known for winning three All-Star Dunk contests
- Ron Santo – 9-time All-Star and 5-time Gold Glove third baseman for the Chicago Cubs, inducted into National Baseball Hall of Fame in 2012
- Tim Sedlacek – soccer player
- Chester Simmons – basketball player
- Maurice Smith – mixed martial artist
- Jason Terry – basketball player
- Jack Thompson – All-American quarterback at Washington State University and No. 3 overall pick in the 1979 NFL draft
- Greg Valentine – wrestler; inducted into the WWE Hall of Fame (2004)
- DeAndre Yedlin – soccer player

=== Business ===
- Bill Gates – co-founder of Microsoft
- Edward Giddings – architect and painter
- Ethan Stowell – chef and restaurateur

=== Literature ===
- Matt Briggs – writer
- Raegan Butcher – poet
- Mary Matsuda Gruenewald – memoirist
- David Guterson – author
- Brian Herbert – author
- Tan Lin – writer
- Leslie Rule – author, novelist, paranormal writer

=== Movies, television, and media ===
- Jon Jon Augustavo – director
- John Aylward – actor (ER, Mad Men, House of Lies, Gangster Squad)
- Eric Barone — game developer, musician, creator of Stardew Valley
- David Michael Barrett – screenwriter and film producer
- Craig Bartlett – Hey Arnold! creator
- Bob Bingham – Jesus Christ Superstar actor
- Josie Bissett – actress (Melrose Place); ex-wife of Rob Estes
- Tori Black – porn star
- Dove Cameron – actress, singer
- Erika Christensen – actress
- Bobby Clark – actor
- Brett Davern – actor, podcaster, Awkward
- Graham Elliot – chef, restaurateur
- Fantasy A – actor (Fantasy A Gets a Mattress); rapper
- India Gants – model, winner of America's Next Top Model Cycle 23
- Tom Gorai – film producer
- Brian Haley – actor, comedian
- Sig Hansen – TV series Deadliest Catch
- Ken Jennings – Jeopardy! contestant and host, author, podcaster
- Bianca Kajlich – television actress noted for role of Jennifer on Rules of Engagement
- Richard Karn – television actor, game show host
- Mike Luckovich – editorial cartoonist
- Dave Losso – stand-up comedian
- Beau Mirchoff – actor known for television series Awkward
- Brian Stokes Mitchell – Broadway actor and baritone singer
- Jeffrey Dean Morgan – actor, known for Grey's Anatomy, Watchmen, Magic City, The Walking Dead, Rampage
- Mark Morris – director, choreographer, dancer
- Janice Pennington – The Price Is Right model
- Megyn Price – actress known for roles on Grounded for Life and Rules of Engagement
- Nick Robinson – actor known for portraying Ryder Scanlon on ABC Family sitcom Melissa & Joey
- Omari Salisbury – journalist, videographer, media company owner
- Derek Sheen – stand-up comedian
- Jean Smart – actress, known for Designing Women, Kim Possible, Frasier, 24, Hacks
- Ryan Stiles – comedian, known for Whose Line Is It Anyway? (both U.S. and U.K. versions), and playing Lewis Kiniski on The Drew Carey Show, and Herb Melnick on Two and a Half Men
- Alison Sudol – actress, singer, songwriter
- Jen Taylor – video game voice actress
- Maiara Walsh – actress, Cory in the House, Desperate Housewives, Switched at Birth
- Zoe Weizenbaum – actress, 12 and Holding, Memoirs of a Geisha
- Rainn Wilson – actor, The Office

=== Music ===
- Nissim Black – rapper
- William Bolcom – composer
- Carrie Brownstein – musician, member of Sleater-Kinney
- Judy Collins – folk singer
- Kenny G – musician
- Isis Gee – American singer in Poland and Eurovision Song Contest entrant
- William Goldsmith – drummer for Sunny Day Real Estate and Foo Fighters
- Stone Gossard – rhythm guitarist of Pearl Jam
- Natalie Grant – Christian music singer/songwriter
- Mary Lambert – singer
- Lil Mosey – rapper
- Macklemore – hip-hop artist, born Ben Haggerty
- Duff McKagan – bassist of Guns N' Roses
- Sir Mix-a-Lot – rap musician
- Mark O'Connor – country violinist (also performs in other genres)
- Stephen O'Malley – member of doom metal band Sunn O)))
- Jake One – hip-hop music producer
- Stacie Orrico – pop singer
- Jay Park – Korean-American singer
- Robin Pecknold – musician, lead singer in the folk-rock band Fleet Foxes
- Lena Raine – video game music composer known for Celeste and Minecraft
- Scott Rockenfield – drummer with Queensrÿche
- John Roderick – musician (The Long Winters), writer, and podcaster
- Jim Sheppard – bassist with Nevermore
- Kim Thayil – lead guitarist of the grunge band Soundgarden
- Janet Thurlow – jazz singer
- Rachel Trachtenburg – drummer, member of The Trachtenburg Family Slideshow Players
- Jennifer Warnes – singer and songwriter
- Mary Youngblood – Native American flutist

=== Politics ===
- Yassamin Ansari – U.S. representative for Arizona
- Maria Cantwell – U.S. senator for Washington
- Jenny Durkan – mayor of Seattle
- Bob Ferguson – governor of Washington
- Steve Gunderson – politician in Montana
- Jay Inslee – former governor of Washington
- Pramila Jayapal – U.S. representative for Washington
- Jerry Lewis – California politician
- Gary Locke – U.S. Ambassador to China, former U.S. Secretary of Commerce, former governor of Washington
- Patty Murray – U.S. senator, former state senator
- Frank Murkowski – Polish-American politician, tenth governor of Alaska
- Lonnie Nelson – civil rights, Indigenous peoples, labor, peace, and social justice activist
- Marjorie Pitter King – first African-American woman to serve in the Washington State Legislature
- William Farrand Prosser – U.S. congressman from Tennessee, Seattle city treasurer, Yakima mayor
- Peter Steinbrueck – politician
- Lynn Woolsey – politician

=== Miscellaneous ===
- Marc D. Angel – rabbi
- Mario Batali – chef, writer, restaurateur and media personality
- Linda B. Buck – scientist
- Art Chantry – graphic design
- Greg Colson – artist
- Stephen Funk – former United States Marine Corps Lance Corporal who refused to deploy to Iraq
- Emerald Ignacio (aka "DriftGirl") – actor and model; builds and races cars
- Irene the Alien – drag performer
- Amanda Knox – tried and convicted in Italy for murder of Meredith Kercher but subsequently acquitted on appeal
- Paul Kuniholm – artist
- Michael Leavitt – sculptor and toy maker
- Melissa Miranda – chef and restaurateur
- Stephen S. Oswald – astronaut
- Aleksander Petrovich Reza Qoli Mirza Qajar, Prince Persidskii – Russian military leader
- Catherine Eaton Skinner – multimedia artist
- Casey Treat – pastor, televangelist
- Paula Mary Turnbull – artist, nun
- Jim Whittaker – first American to climb Mount Everest
- Lou Whittaker – mountaineer, founded Mount Rainier guide service
- Colleen Willoughby – philanthropist

=== Deceased ===
- Ann Reinking – actress, dancer, choreographer, All That Jazz, Micki + Maude, Annie
- Paul Jacob Alexander – newspaper publisher and Seattle City Councilman
- Paul Allen – co-founder of Microsoft
- Signe Toly Anderson – original lead singer of The Jefferson Airplane
- Richard Lee Armstrong – professor and geochemist
- Jo Baer – painter
- Bob Bartlett – politician
- Lawrence James Beck – sculptor
- Frank T. Bell – United States Commissioner of Fish and Fisheries (1933–1939)
- Barbara Berjer – television actress
- Max Brand – author (pen name of Frederick Schiller Faust)
- Gerald Brashear – musician, played with Wyatt Ruther, Ray Charles, Della Reese, Cecil Young Quartet
- Chester Carlson – physicist and inventor
- Carol Channing – actress, Hello, Dolly!, Gentlemen Prefer Blondes, Thoroughly Modern Millie
- Irma Schoennauer Cole – swimmer, civil servant
- Chris Cornell – musician, Soundgarden, Audioslave, Temple of the Dog
- Don Coryell – NFL coach
- Marian Cummings (c. 1892–1984) – first woman in the US to gain a commercial pilot's license
- Warrel Dane – musician, singer for Sanctuary, Nevermore
- Jennifer Dunn – politician
- Frances Farmer – actress
- Pete Fleming – missionary to Ecuador
- Keith Godchaux – musician
- Kathi Goertzen – longtime news anchor for KOMO 4
- Richard F. Gordon Jr. – astronaut
- Bonnie Guitar – singer
- Ed Guthman – journalist
- Ivar Haglund – folksinger and restaurateur
- Jimi Hendrix – rock guitarist and singer
- Steven Hill – actor, portrayed Adam Schiff in the TV series Law & Order
- Eldon Hoke (aka El Duce) – drummer and singer of rock band The Mentors
- Art Hupy – photographer
- Fred Hutchinson – baseball player and manager
- Ruth Jessen – golfer
- Gary Kildall – scientist, inventor and founder of Digital Research
- Ed Lee – first Asian American mayor of San Francisco
- Gypsy Rose Lee – actress and burlesque star
- Mary Livingstone – comedian and wife of Jack Benny
- Kevin McCarthy – actor
- Mary McCarthy – author, critic and social activist
- Rob Roy McGregor – U.S. Navy rear admiral and decorated submariner
- Jon Brower Minnoch – heaviest recorded human in history, weighed 635 kg or 1400 lbs
- Alfred M. Moen – inventor and founder of Moen Incorporated
- Margaret Murie – environmentalist
- Mako Nakagawa – Japanese American advocate, educator, and activist
- Harley D. Nygren – admiral and engineer, first Director of the National Oceanic and Atmospheric Administration Commissioned Officer Corps
- Adella M. Parker – suffragist, politician, lawyer, and high school teacher
- Walt Partymiller – cartoonist
- Tuulikki Pietilä – graphic artist and professor
- Guy Bates Post – stage and film actor
- Hal Riney – advertising executive
- Ron Santo – Hall of Fame baseball player
- Bell M. Shimada – fisheries scientist who pioneered the study of the tuna fishery in the tropical Pacific Ocean
- Robert Stroud – convicted felon, "Birdman of Alcatraz"
- George Tsutakawa – painter, sculptor and professor
- Emmett Watson – journalist

== Moved to Seattle ==
=== Living ===
- Zaid Abdul-Aziz – former Seattle SuperSonics power forward
- Dustin Ackley – former Seattle Mariners outfielder
- Sherman Alexie – author
- Kimball Allen – writer, playwright, performer, gay activist, author of Secrets of a Gay Mormon Felon and Be Happy Be Mormon
- Jeff Ament – bassist of Pearl Jam
- Brian Atwater – geologist
- Anomie Belle – musician
- BenDeLaCreme – actor, drag queen, 5th place and Miss Congeniality of Rupaul's Drag Race Season 6
- Jeff Bezos – former CEO and founder of Amazon.com
- Christopher Boffoli – photographer
- Jeff Borowiak – tennis player
- Bosco – drag queen; contestant and finalist on Rupaul's Drag Race Season 14
- David Brewster – publisher and journalist
- Terry Brooks – author
- Robert Brown – musician, lead singer of Abney Park
- Ed Brubaker – comics writer and artist
- Peter Buck – musician in R.E.M.
- Charles Burns – cartoonist
- Matt Cameron – drummer of Soundgarden and Pearl Jam
- Dyan Cannon – actress
- Roberto Carcelen – Olympian
- Neko Case – musician
- J.R. Celski – Olympic speed skater
- Michael Chang – tennis player, French Open champion
- Valentina Chepiga – IFBB professional bodybuilder
- Dale Chihuly – glass blowing artist
- Nick Collison – Oklahoma City Thunder forward
- Emily Compagno – former federal attorney, Oakland Raiderettes cheerleader, sports reporter, and analyst; current litigator, legal analyst, and Fox News contributor
- Dan Corson – artist
- Kathryn Cramer – science fiction editor (lived in Seattle 1964–1985)
- Cameron Crowe – writer and director
- Chris DeWolfe – founder of MySpace
- Jim Donald – former CEO of Starbucks Coffee
- Mark Driscoll – co-founder and preaching pastor of Mars Hill Church
- C. J. Elleby – basketball player in the Israeli Basketball Premier League
- Rob Estes – actor
- Anna Faris – actress
- Brendan Fraser – actor
- Charlie Furbush – former Seattle Mariners pitcher
- Ari Glass – painter, designer and musician
- Jorge Enrique González Pacheco – Cuban poet
- Neile Graham – poet
- Nicola Griffith – author
- Dave Grohl – drummer of Nirvana; lead singer, guitarist of Foo Fighters
- Caren Gussoff – author
- Gary Hall Jr. – 10-time Olympic medalist
- Leland H. Hartwell – Nobel Prize winner
- Matt Hasselbeck – quarterback, Seattle Seahawks player
- Jenni Hogan – KIRO-TV traffic anchor
- Jerry Holkins – co-creator of Penny Arcade
- David Horsey – cartoonist
- Tom Hulce – actor in National Lampoon's Animal House and Amadeus
- Pramila Jayapal – U.S. representative, former Washington state senator
- Jane Jensen – game designer and author
- Phoenix Jones – superhero, vigilante
- Quincy Jones – musician
- S. T. Joshi – literary critic and editor
- Michael Kinsley – journalist
- Sascha Konietzko – founder and frontman of KMFDM
- Mike Krahulik – co-creator of Penny Arcade
- Jon Krakauer – author
- Jayne Ann Krentz – romance novelist
- Gary Larson – comic strip artist (The Far Side)
- Lusine – IDM musician
- Kyle MacLachlan – actor
- Dave Matthews – musician
- Taylor Mays – football player
- Jim McDermott – Congressman
- Rose McGowan – actress, Charmed, Jawbreaker
- Joel McHale – actor, host of The Soup on E! and star of NBC television series Community
- Mike McCready – lead guitarist of Pearl Jam (considered local, went to grade school – college in Seattle)
- Carol Milne – Canadian American sculptor
- Patrick Monahan – lead singer of the band Train
- Jinkx Monsoon – actor, drag queen, winner of Rupaul's Drag Race Season 5
- Gabe Newell – CEO and founder of Valve
- Krist Novoselic – bassist of Nirvana
- Bill Nye – "Science Guy", actor, comedian
- Yuji Okumoto – actor, The Karate Kid, Part II and Real Genius; owner of Kona Kitchen
- Trey Parker – co-creator of South Park
- Susan Powter – motivational speaker, dietitian, personal trainer and author
- Karen Prell – puppeteer
- Jeff Probst – host of TV show Survivor
- Julia Quinn – author
- John Ratzenberger – actor, played Cliff Clavin on TV series Cheers
- Richard Read – journalist, Pulitzer Prize winner, 1999, 2001
- Ron Reagan – radio talk host, son of Ronald Reagan
- Gary Ridgway – serial killer
- Tom Robbins – author
- Don Roff – writer and filmmaker
- Ryan Rowland-Smith – Seattle Mariners pitcher
- Dan Savage – advice columnist
- Howard Schultz – chairman of Starbucks
- Becky Selengut – chef and cookbook author
- Ross Shafer – comedian and television host
- Richard Silverstein – blogger
- Tom Skerritt – actor
- Quest Skinner – mixed media artist
- Alex Steffen – award-winning author and editor
- Neal Stephenson – science-fiction author
- Adam Stern – symphony conductor
- Mack Strong – retired Seattle Seahawks fullback 1993–2007
- Sunday Nobody – meme and prank artist
- Ichiro Suzuki – baseball player, Seattle Mariners, New York Yankees, and Miami Marlins
- Robert Swift – former Seattle SuperSonics and Oklahoma City Thunder center
- Geoff Tate – lead singer of Queensrÿche
- Lauren Tewes – actress
- Jason Thornberry – writer, musician
- Earnest James Ujaama – community activist and indicted associate of al-Qaeda
- Eddie Vedder – lead singer of Pearl Jam
- Guy Williams – basketball player, Washington Bullets and Golden State Warriors
- Ann Wilson – lead singer and flute player of Heart
- Mark Wirth – "fashion notable", local character
- Al Young – dragster driver

=== Deceased ===
- Harry Anderson – actor
- Frank Barsotti – professional photographer
- Jack Bechdolt – journalist for Seattle Post Intelligencer, illustrator/artist, author of thousands of short stories
- Fred Beckey – mountaineer
- Bill Boeing – aviation pioneer, industrialist
- Robert Bray – actor
- Edwin Frederick Brotze – cartoonist for the Seattle Daily Times
- Libbie Beach Brown – president, Seattle City Federation of the Woman's Christian Temperance Union
- Francis H. Brownell – businessman, president of the Seattle First National Bank
- Octavia Butler – author
- Frank Calvert – cartoonist for the Seattle Daily Times
- James E. Casey – United Parcel Service founder
- Ray Charles – musician
- Charlie Chong – political activist
- Kurt Cobain – musician, Nirvana frontman
- Frantz Hunt Coe – educator
- Alexander DeSoto – physician and philanthropist, founder of Seattle's first hospital
- James S. Ditty – photoengraver, Seattle Star
- James Doohan – actor; Montgomery Scott on Star Trek
- Ford Quint Elvidge – governor of Guam
- Frances Farmer – actress
- Kate Fleming – audio book narrator (voice-over actor) and producer
- George Frederick Frye – Seattle pioneer and politician
- Edgar Gott – aviation pioneer, first president of Boeing
- Carl F. Gould – architect, educator
- George Hager – cartoonist for the Seattle Post-Intelligencer
- John "DOK" Hager – cartoonist for the Seattle Daily Times
- Alex Haley – writer, author of Roots
- Anna Roosevelt Halsted – journalist, daughter of Franklin D. Roosevelt
- Victor Hanzeli – linguist, former Chair of the Department of Romance Languages and Literature at UW
- John Q. Henion, US Army lieutenant general, raised in Seattle
- George H. Hitchings – scientist
- Alan Hovhaness – composer
- Edward Sturgis Ingraham – first superintendent of the Seattle Public Schools; mountaineer
- Don James – American football coach
- Ernest C. Jenner – illustrator for the Seattle Post-Intelligencer
- Russell Johnson – actor; Professor Roy Hinkley on Gilligan's Island
- Kent Kammerer – teacher and activist
- Jacob Lawrence – painter
- Brandon Lee – actor
- Bruce Lee – actor
- Denise Levertov – poet
- J. P. D. Lloyd – Episcopal cleric, the president of the Seattle Public Library
- Keye Luke – actor
- Betty MacDonald – author
- Helene Madison – three gold medals at 1932 Summer Olympics
- Benjamin Brown Martin – illustrator for the Seattle Daily Times
- Rick May – voice actor, theatrical performer, director, and teacher
- William Charles McNulty – illustrator for Seattle Star; teacher at Art Students League
- Asa Mercer – man behind the Mercer Girls, a model for the TV series Here Come the Brides
- Robert Moran – shipbuilder
- Marni Nixon – musician
- Henry O'Malley – United States Commissioner of Fish and Fisheries
- Alexander Pantages – theatrical entrepreneur
- Robert W. Patten – veteran, storyteller, inspiration for cartoon series
- Lionel Pries – architect, educator
- Henry Prusoff – tennis player
- Jonathan Raban – author
- Alfred T. Renfro – cartoonist, Seattle Star
- Theodore Roethke – poet
- Zola Helen Ross – author
- Ann Rule – true crime author
- Bill Russell – retired Hall of Fame basketball player and coach
- James Willis Sayre – theatre critic, journalist, arts promoter, and historian
- Jeff Smith – TV chef and author
- Layne Staley – musician, singer of grunge band Alice In Chains
- Henry Suzzallo – president of the University of Washington (1915–1926)
- Sarah Truax – stage actor
- August Wilson – playwright
- Andrew Wood – singer of grunge band Mother Love Bone
- Lillian Yarbo – actress, comedienne, dancer, and singer
- Mia Zapata – musician

== Athletes from Seattle ==
- Aaron Brooks – NBA PG; Franklin High School
- Bobby Brown – MLB infielder and executive, played in four World Series
- Kevin Burleson – NBA PG; O'Dea High School
- Nate Burleson – NFL WR; O'Dea High School
- Jesse Chatman – NFL RB; Franklin High School
- Doug Christie – NBA SG; Rainier Beach High School
- Josh Conerly Jr. – NFL OT; Rainier Beach High School
- Will Conroy – NBA PG; Garfield (Seattle)
- Fred Couples – PGA; O'Dea High School
- Jamal Crawford – NBA SG; Rainier Beach High School
- Michael Dickerson – NBA SF; Federal Way High School
- Corey Dillon – NFL RB; Franklin High School
- James Edwards – NBA PF; Roosevelt High School
- C. J. Giles – NBA PF; Rainier Beach High School
- Charlie Greene – USATF Olympian; Track & Field Hall of Fame; O'Dea High School
- Spencer Hawes – NBA C; Seattle Prep
- Phil Heath – second world ranked IFBB professional bodybuilder
- Jeff Jaeger – NFL K; University of Washington
- Ruth Jessen – professional golfer, Seattle University
- Earl Johnson – Major League Baseball P; Ballard High School
- Sheila Lambert – WNBA PG; Chief Sealth High School
- Taylor Mays – NFL S; O'Dea High School
- Reese McGuire – MLB catcher; Kentwood High School
- Jack Medica – Olympic swimmer; University of Washington
- Hugh Millen – NFL QB; Roosevelt High School
- Nate Robinson – NBA PG; Rainier Beach High School
- Brandon Roy – NBA SF; Garfield (Seattle)
- Chester Simmons – NBA PG; Garfield (Seattle)
- Peyton Siva – NBA PG; Franklin High School (Seattle)
- Isaiah Stanback – NFL WR; Garfield (Seattle)
- Rodney Stuckey – NBA SG; Kentwood High School
- Jason Terry – NBA PG; Franklin High School
- Martell Webster – NBA SG; Seattle Prep
- Marcus Williams – NBA SF; Roosevelt High School
- Terrence Williams – NBA SF; Rainier Beach High School

== Musical groups ==
- Abney Park – steampunk band, formerly goth
- Aiden – rock band (emo)
- Alice in Chains – rock band (grunge/metal)
- Amber Pacific – pop punk band
- Band of Horses – previously known as Horses, indie rock band
- The Blood Brothers – post-hardcore band
- Blue Scholars – hip hop
- Brite Futures – indie pop
- The Brothers Four – folksingers
- Candlebox – alternative band
- Jerry Cantrell – lead guitarist from Alice in Chains' solo career
- The Classic Crime – alternative band
- Common Market – hip hop
- Dave Matthews Band – originated in Charlottesville, Virginia
- Death Cab for Cutie – alternative band
- Demon Hunter – metal band
- Earth – drone/doom band
- The Fall of Troy – post-hardcore band (originally from Mukilteo, Washington)
- Fleet Foxes – indie rock band
- Foo Fighters – rock band
- The Gits – rock band
- Grand Archives – alternative rock band
- Green River – rock band (grunge)
- Gruntruck – rock band (grunge)
- Harvey Danger – alternative band
- He Is We – indie pop
- The Head and the Heart – indie rock band
- Heart – rock band
- Hey Marseilles – alternative band
- Himsa – Metalcore band
- I Declare War – deathcore band
- Ivan & Alyosha – pop rock band
- Jake One – hip hop producer
- Quincy Jones – jazz musician
- KMFDM – industrial band
- Love Battery – rock band (grunge and psychedelic)
- Macklemore and Ryan Lewis – hip hop/rap duo
- Mad Season – rock super group (grunge)
- Melvins – sludge metal band (originally from Montesano, Washington)
- Metal Church – metal band
- Minus the Bear – alternative rock band
- Modest Mouse – indie rock band (from nearby Issaquah, Washington)
- Mother Love Bone – rock band (grunge)
- Mudhoney – rock band (grunge)
- Murder City Devils – rock band (garage rock)
- MxPx – rock band (punk rock)
- Nevermore – metal band
- Nirvana – rock band (grunge) (originally from Aberdeen, Washington)
- Odesza – electronic/experimental
- Pearl Jam – rock band (grunge)
- Pedro the Lion – indie rock band
- Pickwick – indie rock band
- The Postal Service – indietronica band
- Presidents of the United States of America – rock band
- Queensrÿche – metal band (from nearby Bellevue)
- Thee Satisfaction – hip hop/rap duo
- Schoolyard Heroes – horror punk/post hardcore (originally from Tacoma, Washington)
- The Scene Aesthetic – acoustic/indie pop band
- Screaming Trees – rock band (grunge), originally formed in Ellensburg
- Shabazz Palaces – hip hop/rap duo
- Skin Yard – rock band (grunge)
- Sledgeback – punk band
- Smoosh – alternative pop band
- Soundgarden – rock band (grunge)
- Sunn O))) – doom metal band
- Tad – rock band (grunge)
- Temple of the Dog (grunge)
- Kyle Townsend – record producer, musician
- Trachtenburg Family Slideshow Players – indie rock/pop band
- Trial – political straightedge band
- Ugly Casanova – indie rock band featuring the main member Isaac Brock of Modest Mouse (from nearby Issaquah, Washington)
- Vendetta Red – rock band
- The Ventures – surf band
