= Frank Lima =

Frank Lima may refer to:

- Frank Lima (poet) (1939–2013), American poet
- Frank Lima, better known as The Great Morgani, American street performer

== See also ==
- Frank De Lima (born 1949), comedian from Hawaii
