= Umbrella hat =

Novelty headgear

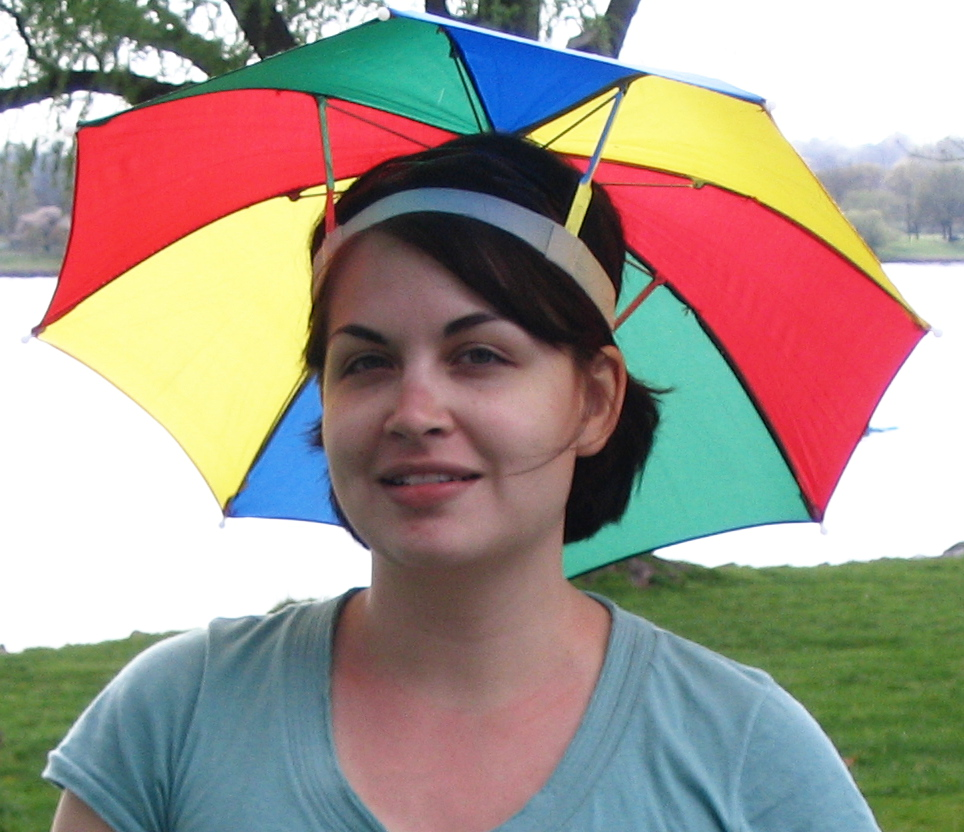
A typical umbrella hat

An umbrella hat is an umbrella canopy attached to a headband that functions as a protection against the drizzle rain or sun. It is seen as a novelty item.

== Description ==
Umbrella hats have a typical umbrella canopy, with ribs supporting a fabric or plastic covering. This canopy is connected to a headband via four short shafts on every other rib to keep the canopy over the head. The canopy is generally collapsible, with the ribs and fabric collapsing around the headband shafts, much like a typical umbrella. Umbrella hats can come in a wide array of colors and sizes, including national flags like the US Flag, the country where it was invented.

== History ==
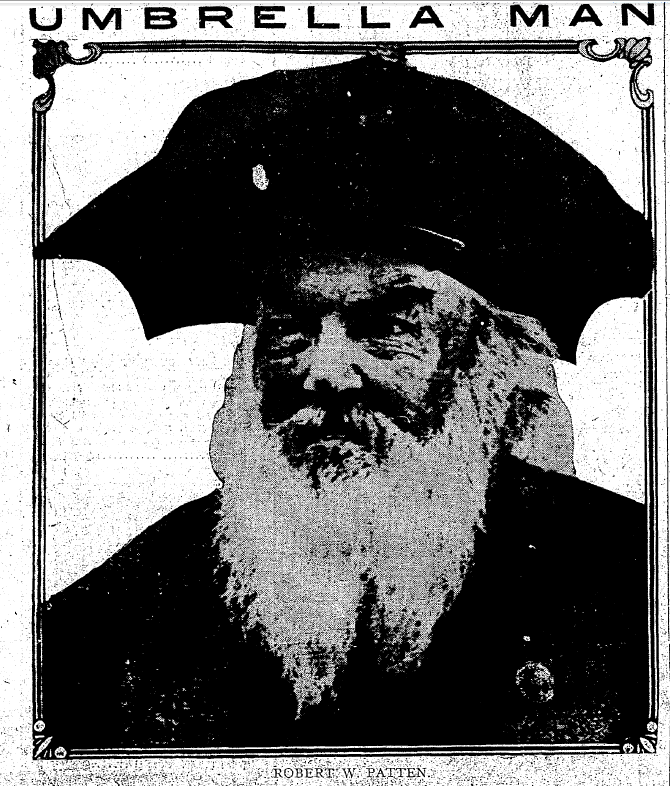
One of the earliest promoters of umbrella hats, Robert W. Patten, known as the Umbrella Man in Seattle, Washington, and San Jose, California.

In December 1880, a patent was taken out on the umbrella hat; patent 250,803.

Robert W. Patten claimed that he invented the umbrella hat while he was prospecting in Mexico. His original hat also included a mosquito net attached to the canopy. Patten moved to Seattle in the 1890s and was dubbed the Umbrella Man. He then became a repairman for umbrellas, and inspired a cartoon from John Hager, depicting Robert Patten with his umbrella hat. Patten was seen as eccentric, and Hager's cartoons of him were comic.

The father of actor Billy Crudup marketed the "brockabrella", a red-and-white version of the hat endorsed by American baseball Hall of Famer Lou Brock. It gave the device a bit of popularity in St. Louis in the mid 20th century.

Today, the umbrella hat has advanced considerably. It is often associated as a cheap and comical novelty item, but it can be used to shield a person against rain or sunshine hands-free. Umbrella Hats are particularly useful to wheelchair users who need the use of both hands in the rain. It is also useful for gardeners, walkers, shoppers, hunters, fishers, political canvassers and general manual laborers.

== See also ==
- List of hat styles

== See also ==
- Asian conical hat
