= Ernest C. Jenner =

American cartoonist

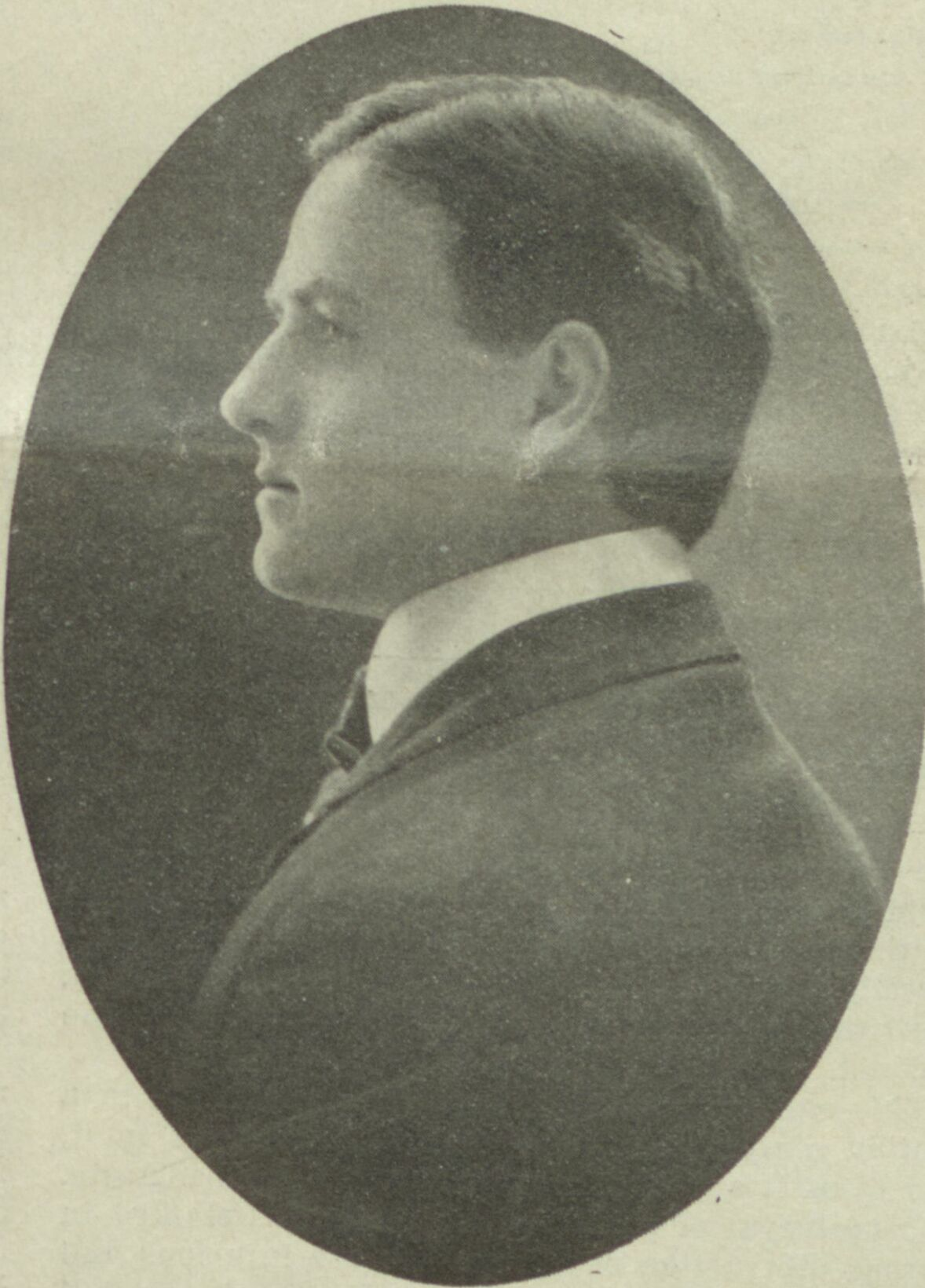
- Jenner, circa 1903
- Born: Ernest Comstock Jenner; March 11, 1875; Healdsburg, California
- Died: June 26, 1946; Seattle, Washington
- Known for: drawing
- Notable work: Cartoons and Caricatures of Seattle Citizens; The Cartoon; A Reference Book of Seattle's Successful Men
- Spouse: Bertha Crockett Jenner
- Children: two children
- Relatives: Charles K. Jenner (father) Cornelia E. Jenner (mother) Clara I. Jenner (stepmother)

Ernest Comstock Jenner (March 11, 1875 – June 26, 1946) was a Seattle newspaper artist and engraver. He was part of the Seattle Cartoonists' Club which produced illustrations and caricatures of Seattle's rich, famous and powerful men.

He was one of eight artists that did artwork in the 1906 book Cartoons and Caricatures of Seattle Citizens. Four of the men, Jenner, Calver, Brotze and Hager all took on a similar project in 1911, as members of the Seattle Cartoonists' Club in a book called The Cartoon; A Reference Book of Seattle's Successful Men.

== Background ==
=== Childhood family ===
Ernest Jenner was born in Healdsburg, California to Charles K. Jenner and Cornelia E. Comstock Jenner. His father moved the family to the Seattle area when Ernest was very young (November, 1876). Charles K. Jenner became a lawyer in Seattle. Ernest was one of six surviving children. After his mother died (1891), his father remarried Clara I. Hough Jenner, and there were three more children.

=== College and career ===
He went to college in Seattle and was listed as student in Polk's Seattle Directory, 1891-1892. In 1893 he began to be listed as a lithographer in the city directory. By 1894 he was an "artist". By 1900, he was an artist on a newspaper and worked that way through the 1910 census. He switched jobs to become an engraver, in the same building as the Seattle Post-Intelligencer. On his 1917-1918 draft card, he said he was a commercial artist for Western Engraving, in the Seattle Post-Intelligencer Building. He also called himself a commercial artist for an engraving company on the 1920 census. He retired in 1929, moving to a farm in the Seattle area, becoming a farmer.

=== Family ===
He married Bertha Crockett and they had two children, Robinson C. and Elizabeth C. Jenner. Bertha outlived him, dying in 1965. He died June 26, 1946.

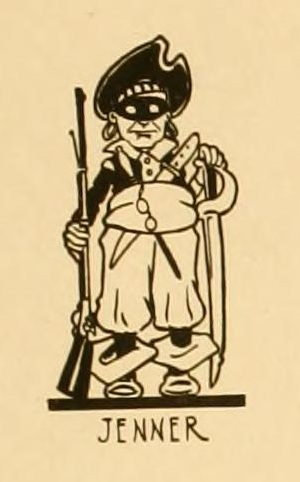
Caricature of Ernest C. Jenner, done by one of the members of the Seattle Cartoonists' Club for the club's 1911 book about famous Seattleites.

== Books ==
- Cartoons and Caricatures of Seattle Citizens (1906) Online text
- The Cartoon; A Reference Book of Seattle's Successful Men (1911), Frank Calvert (ed.), Metropolitan Press, Seattle. Online text

== Censuses not used in article ==
These censuses confirm much of the data above. They weren't used in the article, but anyone looking at Jenner or his family closely may find them useful.

- Washington State and Territorial Censuses, 1880, King County, page 81, lines 26–32. Accessed through Ancestry.com
- Washington State and Territorial Censuses, 1881, King County, page 79, lines 7-13. Accessed through Ancestry.com
