= James S. Ditty =

American developer of Bellevue, Washington

- James S. Ditty from the book The Cartoon; A Reference Book of Seattle's Successful Men. Ditty did photoengraving for the book, which was published by his friend Frank Calvert.
- Born: James Sanderson Ditty; August 10, 1880; Hudson, Ohio
- Died: June 2, 1962 (aged 81); King County, Washington
- Resting place: Kirkland, Washington
- Spouses: Catherine Ditty (1880-1952); Helen Whaley Ditty (1900 - 1981), married 1933
- Relatives: James Margurite Dorothy

Signature for James S. Ditty from his World War I draft card.

James Sanderson Ditty (1880–1962) was a photo-engraver in the Seattle area for 30 years and an "adventurous entrepreneur" and "hard-nosed" businessman who was involved in the developing of Bellevue, Washington. He is best known today as a businessman whose ideas contributed to the development of a city across the lake from Seattle.

He was involved in the Beaux Arts Village, building a house there. As an engraver he was a member of the Seattle Cartoonists' Club and did the engraving for two of their vanity cartoon books of wealthy Seattleites and Washington state-congressmen.

Caricature of James S. Ditty as a pirate. Members of the Seattle Cartoonists' Club drew themselves in this manner, alongside the serious and famous Seattleites they were portraying.

== Highlights ==
1911 James S. Ditty builds English Tudor home in Beaux Arts Community. Ultimately the venture to create an artists colony would fail, the land held for the community's center being sold off, but it would result in a community being founded and Ditty was there to participate.

"Early on", Ditty constructed a cluster of stores, a quarter mile north of Main Street in Bellevue.

1924: One of Bellevue's first developers, Ditty predicted a day when 200,000 people would live on the Eastside.

1928 Ditty publishes map showing his vision for Bellevue and Mercer Island, Washington. He devised detailed plans including the bridging of Lake Washington and an area filled with golf courses and airports.

1929 James S. Ditty envisions east-side metropolis.

== Background and Family ==
James was born in Hudson, Ohio and raised in Cleveland with his brothers Thomas Ross and Frank Leonard Ditty. James Ditty moved to Seattle in 1904. He was a photoengraver there. He became friends with James Calvert, and as part of the artists' colony, helped to found the Beaux Arts Village.

His brothers Thomas Ross Ditty and Frank Leonard Ditty were also photoengravers in Seattle in 1910. James engraved two books for Frank Calvert (illustrator), architectural books of elaborate homes in San Francisco and Seattle. Thomas and Frank didn't stay, returning to Cleveland where they grew up. Their mother moved with them for a period, but died in Bellevue, Washington (near her son James), April 4, 1925.

James married Catherine Theresa De Harpport and they had three children, James, Margaret, and Dorothy. In 1933 he married Helen Whaley.
