= Lucile Saunders McDonald =

American writer (1898-1992)

- McDonald in 1922
- Born: Lucile Saunders; September 1, 1898; Portland, Oregon
- Died: June 23, 1992 (aged 93); Redmond, Washington
- Education: University of Oregon
- Occupations: Journalist; historian; author
- Spouse: Harold D. McDonald (m. 1922)
- Children: 2
- Writing career
- Notable works: Dick and the Spice Cupboard; Jewels and Gems; The Giant with Four Arms
- Notable awards: Headliner Award

Lucile Saunders McDonald (September 1, 1898 – June 23, 1992) was an American journalist, historian, and author of children's books from the Pacific Northwest. The Seattle Times described her as "... the first woman news reporter in all of South America; first woman copy editor in the Pacific Northwest; first woman telegraph editor, courthouse reporter and general news reporter in Oregon; first woman overseas correspondent for a U.S. trade newspaper; first woman on a New York City rewrite desk; second woman journalist in Alaska; and second woman to be a correspondent abroad for the Associated Press". With Zola Helen Ross, McDonald co-founded the Pacific Northwest Writers Association.

== Early life and education ==
Lucile Saunders was born in Portland, Oregon, in 1898, to baker Frank Saunders and schoolteacher Rose Saunders. She had a sister named Iris McRae. McDonald attended the University of Oregon while working for the Eugene Daily Guard.

== Career ==
In her early career, she worked at The Bulletin in Bend, as a reporter and news editor for The Oregonian in Portland, and as wire editor for The Statesman-Journal in Salem. She went on to write for newspapers from Alaska to South America, including the Seattle Daily Times, The New York Times, the United Press International, the Bellevue Journal-American and the Cordova Daily Times. McDonald was a feature history writer and book reviewer for The Seattle Times from 1940 to 1966. She went on to write over 450 history columns for the Journal-American until her retirement in 1987. She wrote or co-authored 28 books.

McDonald was a member of the Seattle Free Lances, the Authors League of America, Theta Sigma Phi's National Executive Board, and the Newswomen's Club of New York. She was active in several local historical societies, including the Puget Sound Maritime Historical Society.

== Personal life ==
She married Harold D. McDonald in 1922. They had a son and a daughter. They moved to Seattle in 1940; they also resided in Bellevue and Kirkland, Washington.

Lucile McDonald died on June 23, 1992, in Redmond, Washington. Her autobiography, A Foot in the Door: The Reminiscences of Lucile McDonald, was posthumously published in 1995.

== Awards and honors ==
McDonald was a 1959 Headliner Awards recipient from the Association for Women in Communications.

== Partial works ==
=== Children's books ===
- Dick and the Spice Cupboard
- Jewels and Gems
- The Giant with Four Arms

=== Co-authored with Ross ===
- (1950) The mystery of Castesby Island
- (1952) Stormy year
- (1954) Fridays̓ child
- (1956) Mystery of the long house
- (1956) Pigtail pioneer
- (1957) Wing Harbor
- (1958) The courting of Ann Maria
- (1959) Assignment in Ankara
- (1961) Winter's answer
- (1959) The stolen letters
- (1968) The sunken forest

=== Non-fiction ===
- (1953) Washington's Yesterdays
- (1958) Search for the Northwest Passage, Library of Congress CC# 58-11860, Ill.
- (1972) Swan Among the Indians, Life of James G. Swan, 1818-1900, Portland, Oregon, Binfords & Mort.
