= George Hager =

American cartoonist

- Caricature of Hager, done by one of the members of the Seattle Cartoonists' Club for the club's 1911 book about Seattleites
- Born: Luther George Hager; March 1885; Indiana, U.S.
- Died: Unknown
- Education: Arts Student League, New York and University of Washington, Seattle
- Known for: Drawing
- Notable work: The Adventures of the Waddles
- Spouse: Beatrice Holbrook Dearborn
- Children: 1

George Hager was an American illustrator and editorial cartoonist who worked for the Seattle Post-Intelligencer in the early 20th century. He was the son of another Seattle cartoonist, John Hager. He is known for being the first illustrator to show the Pike Place Market in Seattle.

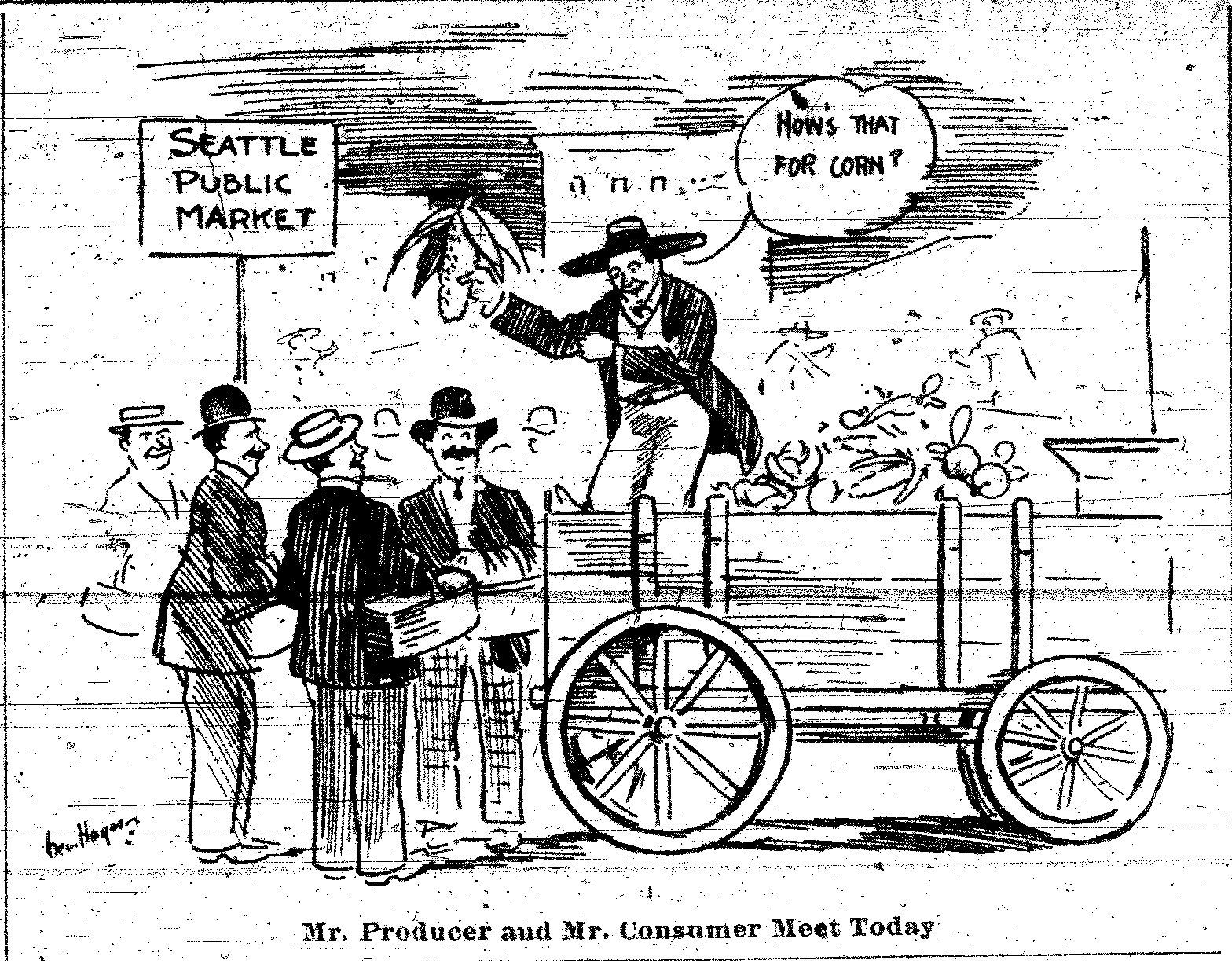

Hager also edited children's page for the Christian Science Monitor He studied art at the University of Washington and the Arts Student League in New York, where another Seattle cartoonist, William Charles McNulty taught. He was also a member of the Seattle Cartoonists' Club, and illustrated several of the men in the club's book, The Cartoon; A Reference Book of Seattle's Successful Men.

== Comic strip, The Waddles ==
Waddles was a duck drawn by Hager for the Christian Science Monitor in the cartoon strip The Adventures of the Waddles. According to the Seattle Daily Times, Waddles was a continuation of his father's duck, associated with the weather man. John Hager had to discontinue his illustrating when his eyes went, and his children ran the Waddles comic strip. John's daughter, Mrs. George Dearborne, wrote the rhyming lines to go with the cartoon, while son George Hager did the illustration.
