= John Olaf Todahl =

American cartoonist

- Illustration by Todahl for Red Cross Magazine, August 1918.
- Born: September 1, 1884; Crookston, Minnesota
- Disappeared: between August 14, 1924 and November 4, 1924 on the sloop Leiv Eriksson off the coast of Greenland
- Status: never found
- Occupations: Illustrator, artist, newspaper cartoonist
- Employers: Newspapers: New York Tribune; Bridgeport Standard; Magazines: Red Cross Magazine
- Notable work: Covers of Red Cross magazine, May 1918 and August 1918
- Spouse: Marjorie (Atwood) Todahl
- Children: Virginia Todahl
- Parent(s): Ole Albert Todahl; Mary Todahl (mother)

John Olaf Todahl (1884–1924) was an American illustrator and cartoonist. He worked principally as a newspaper editorial cartoonist.

== Biography ==
John Olaf Todahl traveled throughout his career, living on both coasts of the United States. He illustrated for newspapers in Seattle, New York and Connecticut. While in Seattle, he joined the Seattle Cartoonists' Club, an association of Seattle newspaper cartoonists, getting together outside of their newspapers for a creative and business venture. They produced The Cartoon; A Reference Book of Seattle's Successful Men (1911), a vanity cartoon book with caricatures, cartoons and photos of Seattle's wealthy and prominent citizens.

He moved to the East Coast of the United States between 1911 and 1913, settling in Connecticut with his wife, Margery Todahl Blokhine, and daughter, Virginia (born 1919). He also spent time in New York.

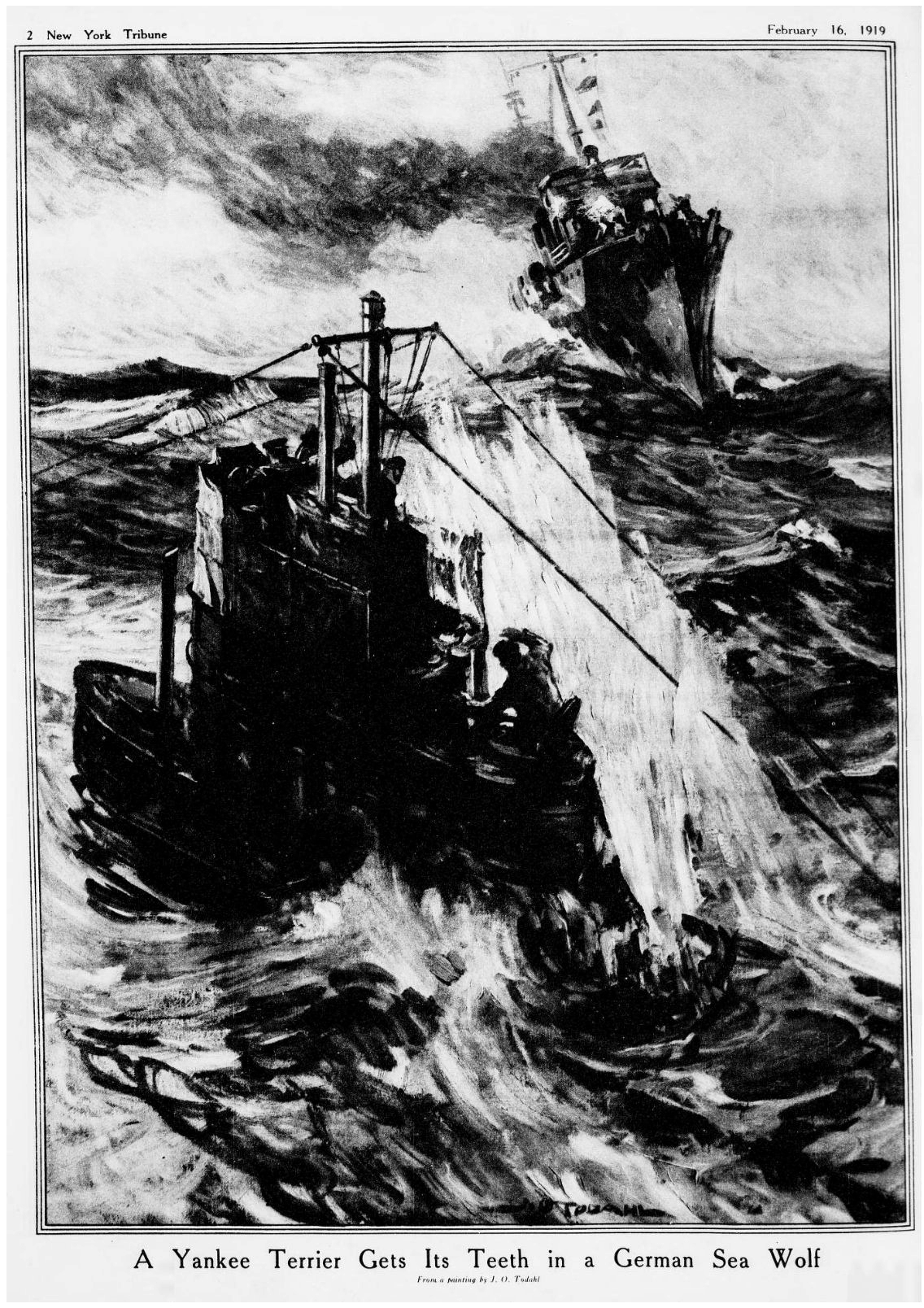
A painting in the New York Tribune to illustrate a marine battle during World War I by artist John Olaf Todahl, published February 6, 1919. Originally in color, but in black and white here due to its preservation.

After he moved to the east coast, he began to have success branching out into other areas of illustration. The work that he is remembered for today is a painting he did for the Red Cross during World War I in May 1918. It featured the picture of a medic caring for a wounded soldier, signaling for help. He did a second cover for the Red Cross in August 1918, a soldier carrying a wounded military service dog. His other works were of marine themes, of military ships at sea, struggling with the elements and fighting. Though he moved into magazines, he continued to make a living from news illustrations, including the Bridgeport Standard in the Connecticut town where he lived, and the New York Tribune.

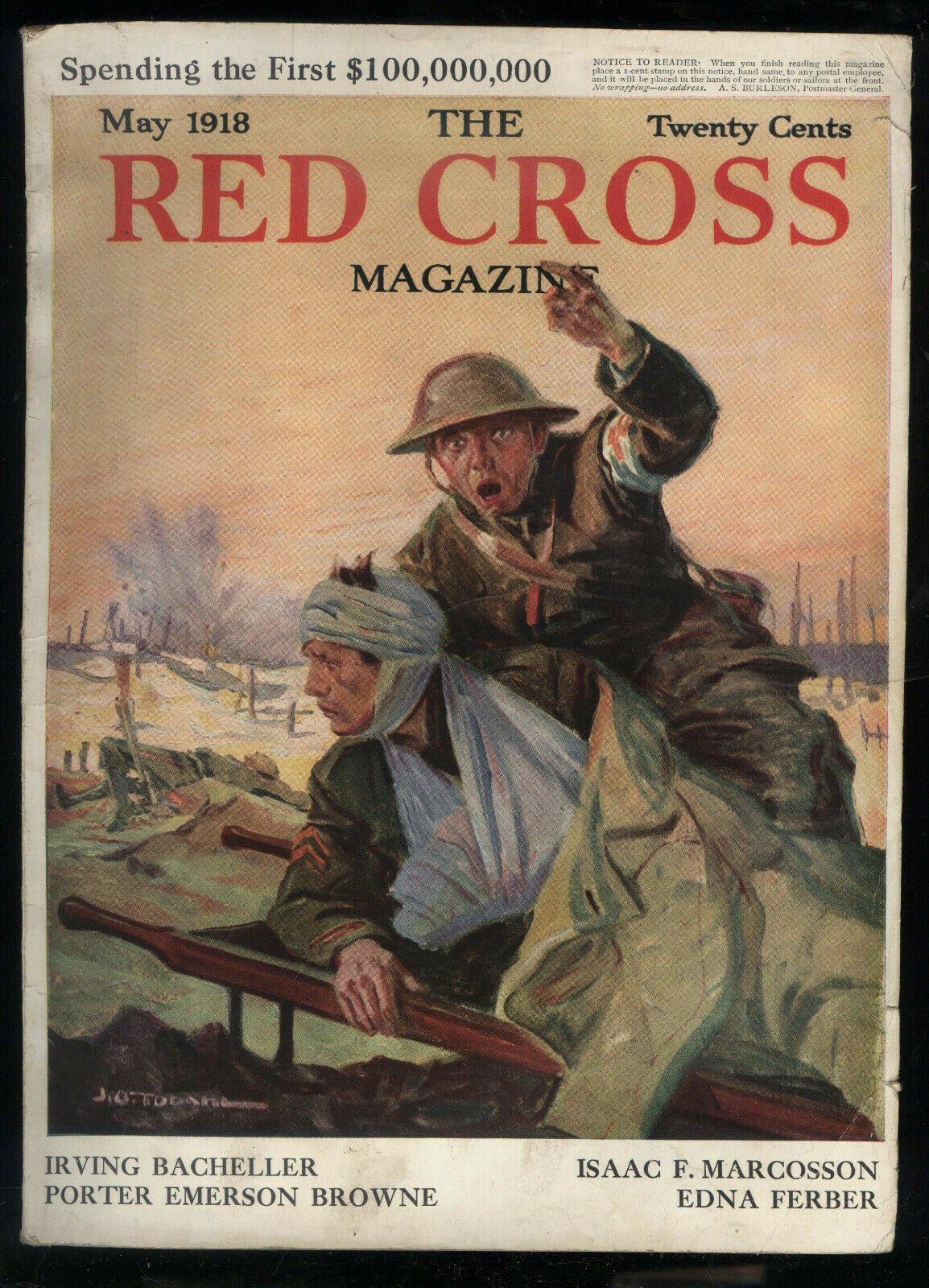
John Olaf Todahl's most commonly reproduced work today, the cover of Red Cross Magazine, issue May 1918.

== North Atlantic Voyage ==
He struck a friendship with William Washburn Nutting (1884-1924) an author for whom he illustrated the book Cinderellas of the Fleet and the two traveled together to Norway in 1924. Todahl's father was from Norway and it gave him a chance to visit his father's home country while painting "marine scenes along the rugged coast of Norway". In Norway, Nutting bought a boat, and the two (along with author Arthur S. Hildebrand) decided to sail the boat from Bergen, Norway back to the North American, along with stops in Iceland and Greenland. This voyage was reported in the newspapers to be "the first voyage over that tossing, ice-choked northern path in a boat so small since the Vikings sailed their dragon ships to Vinland". That account ignored the Viking ship reenactment that sailed from Norway to the United States in 1893. This final artistic voyage, on a ship named Leiv Eriksson, ended in a combination of seaborne ice and a winter hurricane sometime between August and November 1924.

Caricature of John Olaf Todahl for the Seattle Cartoonists' Club 1911 book featuring prominent men of Seattle. Artists drew themselves as pirates.
