= Seattle Cartoonists' Club =

- The Seattle Cartoonists' Club shows itself in caricature, in its 1911 book The Cartoon; A Reference Book of Seattle's Successful Men.
- Formation: c1911
- Dissolved: most members died in the 1930s
- Purpose: Members worked and associated with one another for group project
- Headquarters: Seattle, Washington

The Seattle Cartoonists' Club was an association in Seattle, Washington, of editorial cartoonists and caricaturists in the early 20th century. Working for different papers and companies associated with publishing, the men got together to produce joint works. The men were important for their role in documenting Seattle's culture and for their editorializing. Their books were works that blend the serious with the nonsensical.

== Vanity books ==
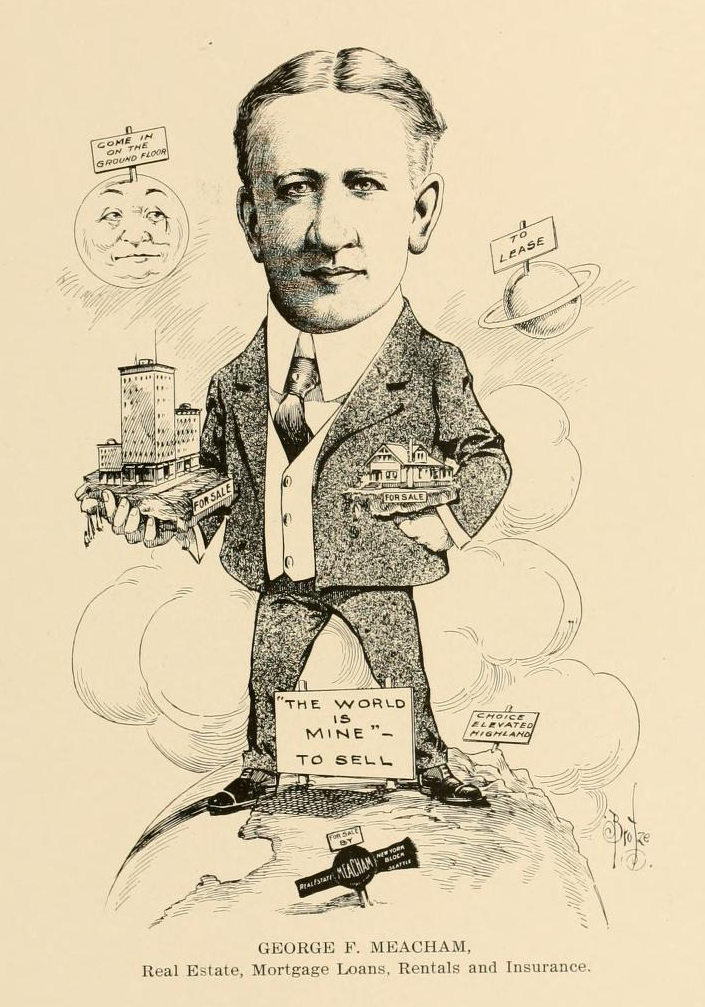
"The World is Mine To Sell" George F. Meacham by Edwin F. Brotze, from the 1906 book Cartoons and Caricatures of Seattle Citizens, illustrated by Seattle cartoonists, including four who later billed themselves as part of the Seattle Cartoonists' Club.

They produced a genre of books called vanity cartoon books, books that were subscribed to by businessmen in their community, where everybody bought a copy to pay for the book's creation. The books featured caricatures and illustrations of the men, stylized in the editorial cartoon style of the day. They tended to show attitudes of the men and things that they were known for. The vanity books served two functions. They lent a sense of prestige to the businessmen who paid for them; caricatures were viewed as recognition in their community that they were elite. They were also good advertising.

In 1906, four members participated in creating Cartoons and Caricatures of Seattle Citizens. The book was followed by two more in 1911, The Cartoon: A Reference Book of Seattle's Successful Men (by 11 members) and 12th Session of the Washington State Legislature (4 members participated).

=== From city to state legislature ===
Members were respected enough cartoonists to be invited to handle the politicians Washington's 12th State Legislature, and even though only one was officially doing the work, looking at the book reveals the hand of three others. Club members Renfro, W. C. McNulty (Von-A), Frank Calvert, and James S. Ditty all took a hand in creating the book.

=== Getting into the book ===
It was not unusual for artists of the vanity books to include themselves in the books. The methods varied among the groups working, with some including portraits, some cartoons and some a signature page for the artists. In The Cartoon: A Reference, the Seattle Cartoonists' Club included themselves among the Wall-Street-style banking, real-estate and business pirates. The book was about the important men in Seattle, and the cartoonists added caricatures of themselves as pirates and as working artists, struggling to please.

They were cartoonists; most were known by a name scratched into the bottom edge of a newspaper illustration, if someone bothered to read it. Yet their caricatures were printed with those of the richest and most important men in the region. Although the artists' names have faded to the point of being obscure, whenever someone reads their book, their caricatures are still there, with tiny signatures among the more well-known names.

In The Twelfth Session of the Washington State Legislature they turned their pens upon one another in less cartoonish manner. In the back three pages of the book are portraits of the artists, done in the same manner as the senators and representatives. Just like the senators, these members of the art community have biographies.

== Clubmembers ==
The club's formal declaration of its existence was on the title page of The Cartoon: A Reference, the Seattle Cartoonists' Club. Although the men came from rival city newspapers and other businesses, they worked jointly on the vanity books.

=== Seattle Times ===
- Calvert (Frank Calvert, a founding member of the Beaux Arts Village, Lake Washington. Illustrator for Seattle Times.)
- Brotze (Edwin Frederick Brotze. News artist in Chicago, Los Angeles (L.A. Times) and Seattle (Seattle Times).)
- DOK (John "Doc" Hager, cartoonist The Seattle Times, playwright, children's illustrator.)
- Martin (Benjamin Brown Martin, cartoonist Seattle Times, moved to New York c1920 as commercial artist. Signature "B. Martin" on his illustrations.)

=== Seattle Post-Intelligencer ===
- Geo Hager (George Hager, son of DOK. Illustrator for Seattle Post-Intelligencer, which was rival to his father's paper, The Seattle Times.)
- Jenner (Ernest C. Jenner, Seattle Post-Intelligencer, newspaper artist c1893-c1920, commercial artist c1920-c1930, retired as farmer.)
- Bechdolt (Jack Bechdolt, writer for Seattle Post-Intellingencer; made a signed illustration in the club's book.)

=== Seattle Star ===
- Renfro (Alfred T. Renfro, one of the founders of the Beaux Arts Society in Seattle. Art editor and illustrator, Seattle Star.)
- Von-A (William Charles McNulty, went on to be instructor at Art Students League of New York. Illustrator for Seattle Star.)
- Ditty (James S. Ditty, engraver for Seattle Star and others, built a home at the Beaux Arts Village. Became a businessman in Bellevue, Washington.)

=== Paper not known ===
- Todahl (John Olaf Todahl, marine artist, died in sailing trip off coast of Greenland, 1924, on trip from Norway to U.S.).

== Associated Cartoon Artists of Seattle ==
In addition to the latter Seattle Cartoonists Club, many of the artists met using a different name, The Associated Cartoon Artists of Seattle. The men published an article in the Seattle Times about a competition they were having with a small local newspaper editor, H. A. Chadwick, over the idea for what became their first cartoon book. Miss E. A. Thompson had come to town to organize the creation of a vanity cartoon book, having done so in San Francisco and Portland. She presented the idea to the Chadwick, in order to get photographs to use in the book, and according to the article, he stole her idea and tried to organize the book himself. That was when the group published an article which outed Chadwick, and at the same time announcing their existence and idea to Seattle. Ultimately it was this earlier group (with many members who took part in the Seattle Cartoonists' Club) that produced Cartoons and Caricatures of Seattle Citizens in 1906.

The cartoonists who made up this earlier association were Frank Calvert, John R. Gill, C. H. Dickson Jr., E. F. Broze [sic.], Ernest Jenner, A. Bobbitt, T. Epting, and Tom Thurlby.

=== A third Seattle vanity cartoon book ===
The editor whom the cartoonists despised in their article was H. A. Chadwick, the editor of the Argus Monthly. He did continue with the "stolen" book idea, publishing Men Behind the Seattle Spirit - The Argus Cartoons, 15 July 1906.

== Publications by the members ==
- Cartoons and Caricatures of Seattle Citizens (1906) Online text
- The Cartoon; A Reference Book of Seattle's Successful Men, Frank Calvert (ed.), Metropolitan Press, Seattle, 1911. Online text
- 12th Session of the Washington State Legislature by Alfred T. Renfro, with illustrations by W. C. McNulty (Von-A), W. C. Morris, Edward S. Reynolds, and Frank Calvert. Three of the cartoonists again included sketches of themselves. Online text
