= The Great Morgani =

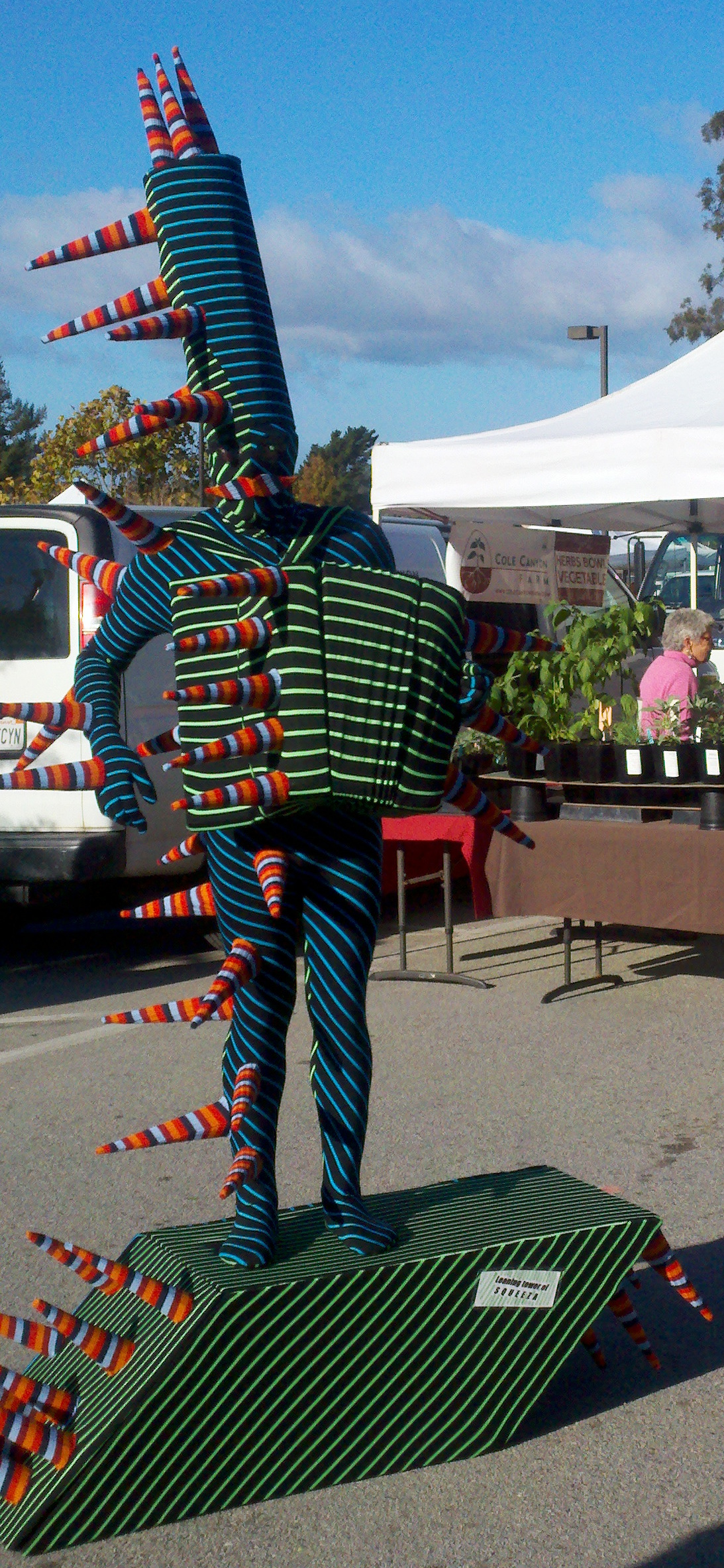
- The Great Morgani performing in his "Leaning Tower of Squeeza" costume.

Background information
- Also known as: The Great Morgani
- Born: Frank Lima; September 8, 1942 (age 83); Los Banos, California
- Origin: Santa Cruz, California, USA
- Occupation: accordionist
- Years active: 1995–present
- Website: https://web.archive.org/web/2023/https://thegreatmorgani.com/

The Great Morgani (a.k.a. Frank Lima) is an American street performer and performance artist from Santa Cruz, California. Although he is an experienced accordionist with 60 years of experience, he is most noted for his spectacular costumes which sometimes take up to 100 hours of work.

== Life and career ==
Frank Lima was born in 1942 in Los Banos, California. His family moved to Santa Cruz in 1946. Lima started performing at age 11, mostly in trios at Portuguese events. He enjoyed success in his first career as a stockbroker, but retired when he was 35. Almost two decades later in 1995, he embarked on a second career playing accordion as a street performer.

In the first few years of his street performing, he performed with his face uncovered. Gradually, he developed more elaborate costumes, relying on the sewing skills he learned from his mother, a master seamstress. Although he performs barefaced privately, he currently performs in public with face covered, often by the material used in the rest of his costume.

== Current Performances ==
The Great Morgani has performed a dozen times at the Cotati Accordion Festival and other festivals including the Gilroy Garlic Festival. He regularly performs at farmer's markets throughout Santa Cruz County and Silicon Valley, as well as downtown shopping areas in Santa Cruz and Los Gatos.

He has collected 42 accordions and assembled more than 130 costumes, which he entitles with names such as "Touluse Morgani" and "Glyn-duh", reflecting themes inspired from literature and historical figures. In February 2014 Lima announced his retirement from street performing in downtown Santa Cruz due to city ordinances that regulate artists and vendors.

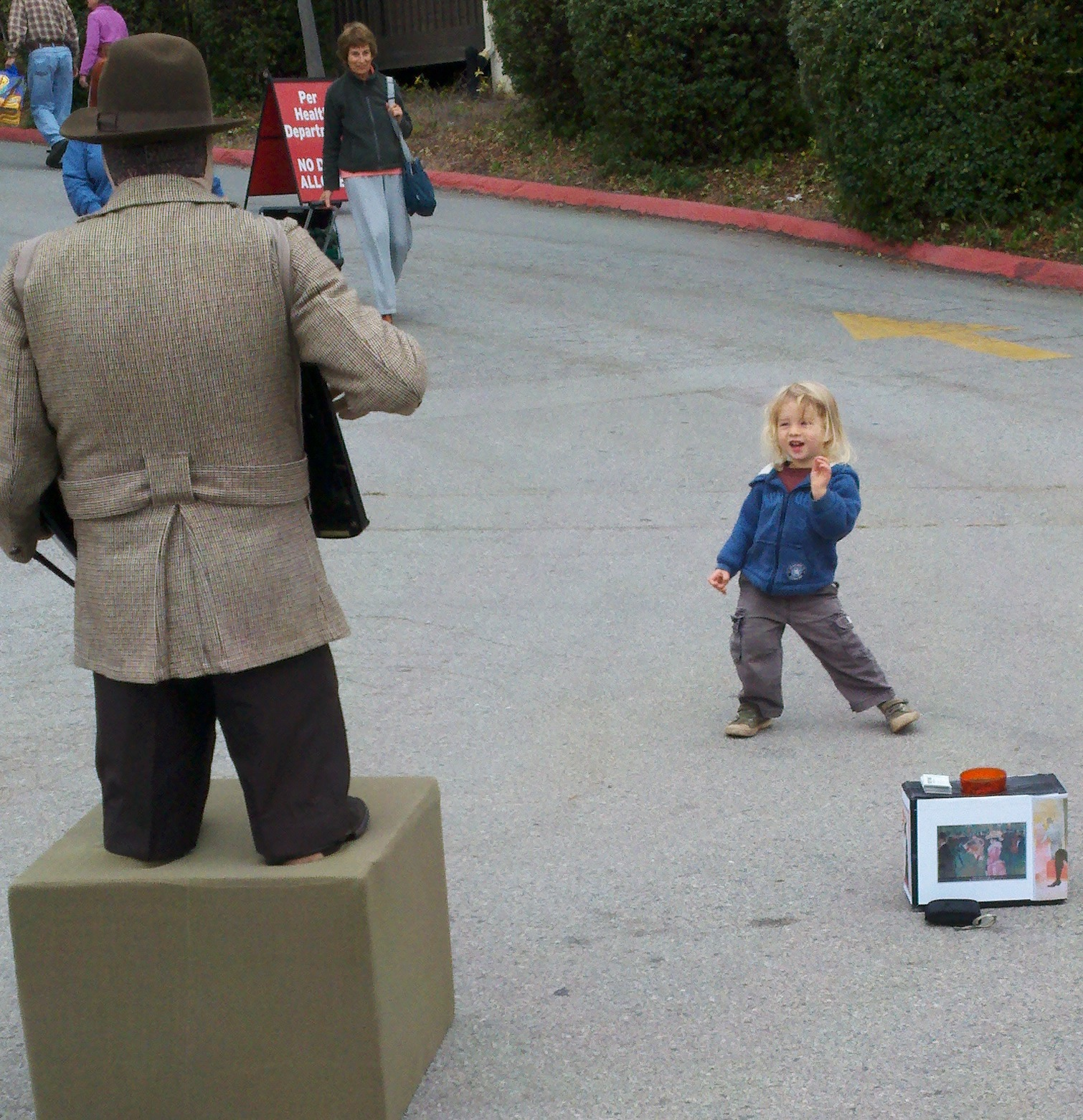
"Toulouse" captivating an audience of one.

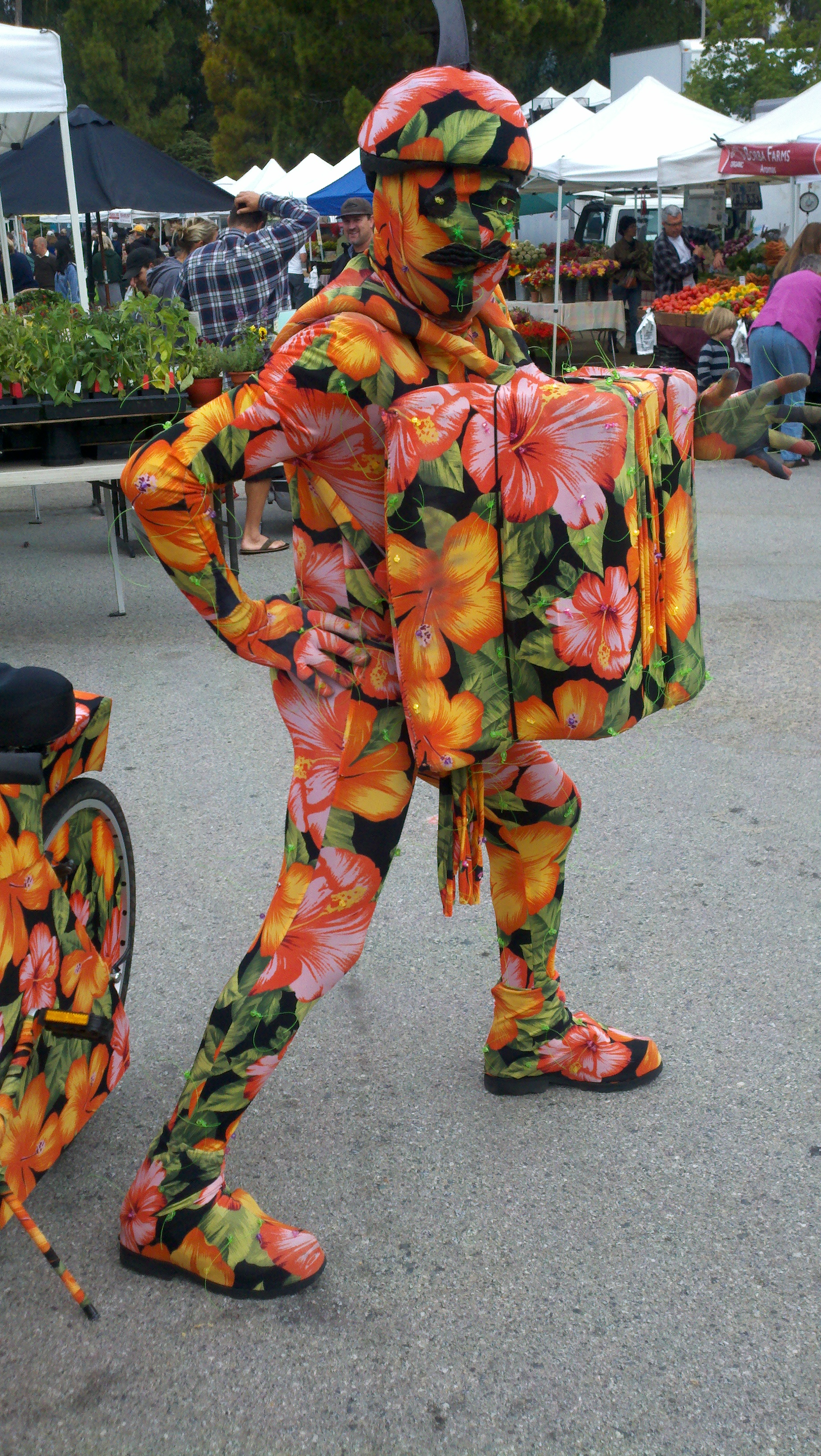
"Flower Powered"

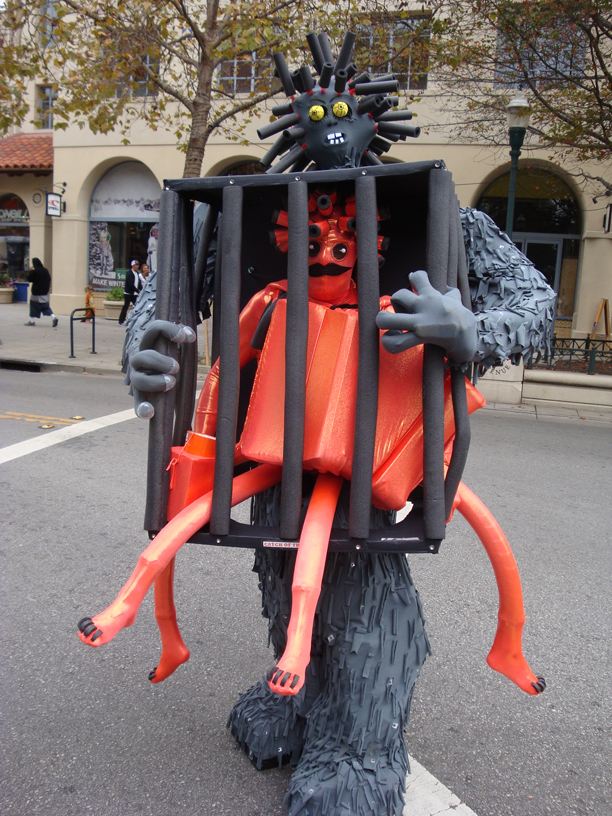
"Catch of the Day"

== See also ==
Purple Mark
