= Benjamin Brown Martin =

American cartoonist

Benjamin B. Martin
- Caricature of Benjamin B. Martin as a pirate. Members of the Seattle Artists club drew themselves in this manner, alongside the serious and famous Seattleites they were portraying.
- Born: Benjamin Brown Martin; June 1883; Fargo, North Dakota
- Died: 22 April 1932; Bloomington, Illinois
- Notable work: The Cartoon; A Reference Book of Seattle's Successful Men
- Spouses: Lydia Garrison (married August 2, 1909, died 1911); Cora Lucinda Davidson (had two children with, died 1917)
- Children: June Dair Martin; Ellen Jane Martin
- Relatives: John F. D. Martin (Father); Elizabeth "Lizzie" L. Martin (Mother)

Benjamin B. Martin (1883 – 1932) was an artist. He made his living in Seattle, Washington, where he worked as an illustrator for the Seattle Times, and later in New York, where he worked as a commercial artist. One of his lasting legacies was his work as a member of the Seattle Cartoonists' Club, in the club's book The Cartoon; A Reference Book of Seattle's Successful Men.

== Joy and tragedy in Seattle ==
He and his wife Lydia moved to Seattle, and she died January 14, 1911, the same year his work for the cartoonists' club was published. He stayed in Seattle, reporting to the draft board that he was an artist for the Seattle Times in 1918.

He married again, to Cora Lucinda Davidson, and they had twin girls Ellen Jane Martin and June Dair Martin, born May 14, 1916. Cora died from tuberculosis fifteen months later on August 3, 1917, in Spokane, Washington. Benjamin continued living in Seattle, with an aunt, Pleiades Martin, and raising his daughters; they were together in January 1920 for the Census. Eleven months after that his daughter Ellen died on December 6, 1920. After Ellen's death, Martin's family life "fell apart" and he and a fellow artist, Jack Bechdolt, hit the road as "Soldiers of Fortune". June was shipped off to Oakland, California, where she joined her grandparents.

== New York ==
Martin eventually ended up in New York City, where he established himself again as an illustrator. As his fortunes improved, he asked his parents, along with his daughter June, to live with him in the city. His mother, Elizabeth, died in New York City on November 6, 1923, and the family "fell apart" again. Ben and his friend Jack, hit the road again, leaving his daughter June in the care of his father. The state eventually decided to "take June [his remaining daughter] out of circumstances and sent her to the Hope Farm school" Verbank, New York, about 1927. They never reunited.

In 1930, Brown reported to the federal census that he was living as a roomer in New York, working as a commercial artist. He spent the last years of his life as a hobo, according to his grandson, and died in 1932 in Bloomington, Illinois. The death certificate there listed him as a sign painter.

Illustration of S. R. Hutchinson, superintendent of the Seattle Lighting Company in 1915 by Benjamin B. Brown, Seattle Daily Times, February 14, 1915.

== Works ==
- The Cartoon; A Reference Book of Seattle's Successful Men, Frank Calvert (ed.), Metropolitan Press, Seattle, 1911.
