= Catherine Eaton Skinner =

American artist

- Born: 1946 (age 79–80)
- Education: Stanford University
- Known for: Multimedia artist
- Website: https://www.ceskinner.com/

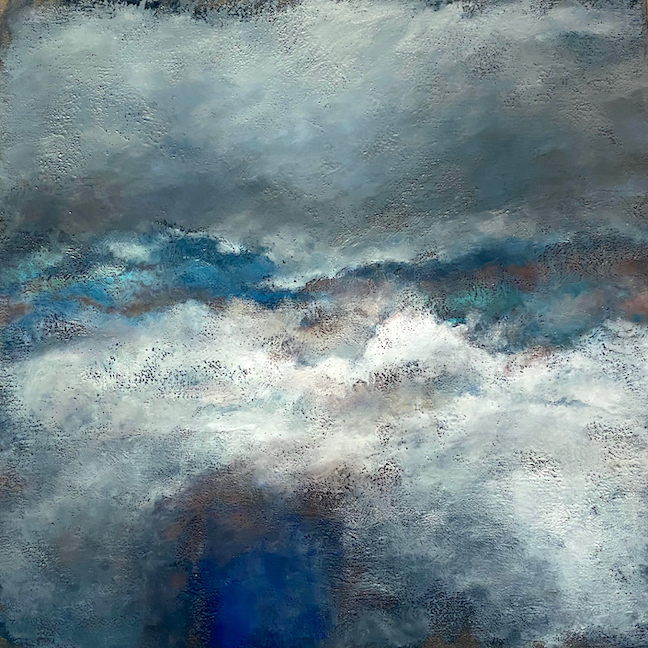
Crosscurrents I

Catherine Eaton Skinner (born 1946) is a multimedia artist with studios in Seattle, Washington and Santa Fe, New Mexico.

== Early life and education ==
Catherine Eaton Skinner (Catherine Gene Walker) was raised in the Pacific Northwest. She received her BA in Biology from Stanford University while simultaneously studying painting with Bay Area Figurative painters Nathan Oliveira and Frank Lobdell. Her professional career of over 50 years began as a biological illustrator, specializing for 20 years in the ecological integration of marine invertebrates and algae of the Pacific Coast. Skinner presently works between studios in Seattle and Santa Fe as a interdisciplinary artist using methods of painting, encaustic, photography, printmaking, book making, and sculpture using cast glass and bronze.

== Art ==
Skinner's work is centered on the balance of the five elements - earth, fire, water, air, and space, as well as methods of numerical systems and patterning used to construct an order to our world. Gravitating towards mark-making methods that have been used by peoples and animals to indicate presence in place and construct a deeper relationship with nature, she moves from the simplicity of tantric forms to the complexities of grids, encompassing repetition and multiplicity. Skinner’s poetry has often been published with her work in exhibitions and press.

Skinner states, “Recognizing the importance of the polar energies in our lives is paramount to our survival within our delicate ecosystem. Each of my works becomes an offering to new possibilities; a modern mandala born out of ancient tradition.”

== Bibliography ==
Skinner's monograph, 108, published by Radius Books of Santa Fe, New Mexico, documents her investigation of this symbolic sacred number, using repetition in multiple explorations. Her artwork is included in Art of Discovery: Exploring a Northwest Art Collection, as well as the cover art of Others Will Enter the Gates and Speak For the Trees. Unleashed, an earlier monograph published by the University of Washington Press in conjunction with the Woodland Park Zoo, centers on man’s relationship to various animals with focus through their eyes.

== Press ==
Over 100 publications (magazines, newspapers) have highlighted her work in feature articles and/or cover art work, including LandEscape Art Review, ART UP MI, Milan; Buddhist Art Journal; Art Reveal, Magazine 43, Contempo Annual, Saatchi Art's The Women-Only Edition of Invest In Art – Women's History Month, Blink Ink, iō Literary Journal, The Woven Tale Press, Apero, New Mexico Bar Bulletin and Art Folio 2020 and 2022.

== Selected exhibitions ==
Skinner has completed over 50 solo exhibitions, including Pie Projects, Santa Fe, New Mexico; Waterworks Gallery, Friday Harbor, Washington; Las Cruces Museums: Branigan Cultural Center, Las Cruces, New Mexico; Perry and Carlson, Mount Vernon, Washington; Enterprise Library Gallery, Las Vegas, Nevada; ILLUMINATIONS/RAVENS, a 6-month, 6-city Missouri tour; Summerlin Library and Performing Arts Center, Las Vegas, Nevada; Abmeyer + Wood Fine Art, Seattle, Washington; Friesen Gallery, Sun Valley, Idaho; Gallery Saoh & Tomos, Tokyo, Japan; and Linda Durham Gallery, Santa Fe, New Mexico. Her work has been in numerous group exhibitions in museum and galleries, including the Royal Academy of Arts, London, United Kingdom; Marin MOCA, Novato, California; Wilding Museum of Art & Nature, Solvang, California; Gallery Fritz, Santa Fe, New Mexico; Katonah Museum of Art, Katonah, New York; Museum of Encaustic Art, Santa Fe, New Mexico; Morris Graves Museum of Art, Eureka, California; The City of Santa Fe Arts Commission Community Gallery, Santa Fe, New Mexico; Bellevue Art Museum, Bellevue, Washington; Museum of Northwest Art, La Conner, Washington; Whatcom Museum, Bellingham, Washington; Hall of Awa Japanese Handmade Paper Museum, Tokushima, Japan; and the Yellowstone Art Museum, Billings, Montana.

== Awards & Residencies ==
Art in Embassies Program/art selected for the U.S. Embassy, Port Moresby, Papua New Guinea 2020-2023 and Acclaimed Artists Series 2020-2022, Art in Public Places, New Mexico Department of Cultural Affairs; Curator, Within/Without, Contemporary Photographs of Cuba, Bumbershoot Art Festival, Seattle, Washington, 2001; Seattle Arts Commission, 1998 - 2000; Santa Fe Art Institute, Nathan Oliviera, 1999 and Anne Truit, 2000.

== Collections ==
Public collections include the Henry Art Museum, University of Washington, Seattle, Washington; Tacoma Art Museum, Tacoma, Washington; Museum of Northwest Art, La Conner, Washington; Virginia Mason Medical Center, Seattle, Washington; Seattle University's Seeds of Compassion Collection, Seattle, Washington; Museum of Encaustic Art, Santa Fe, New Mexico; and Seattle Children's Hospital, Seattle, Washington..
