= Beaux Arts Village, Washington =

- Town
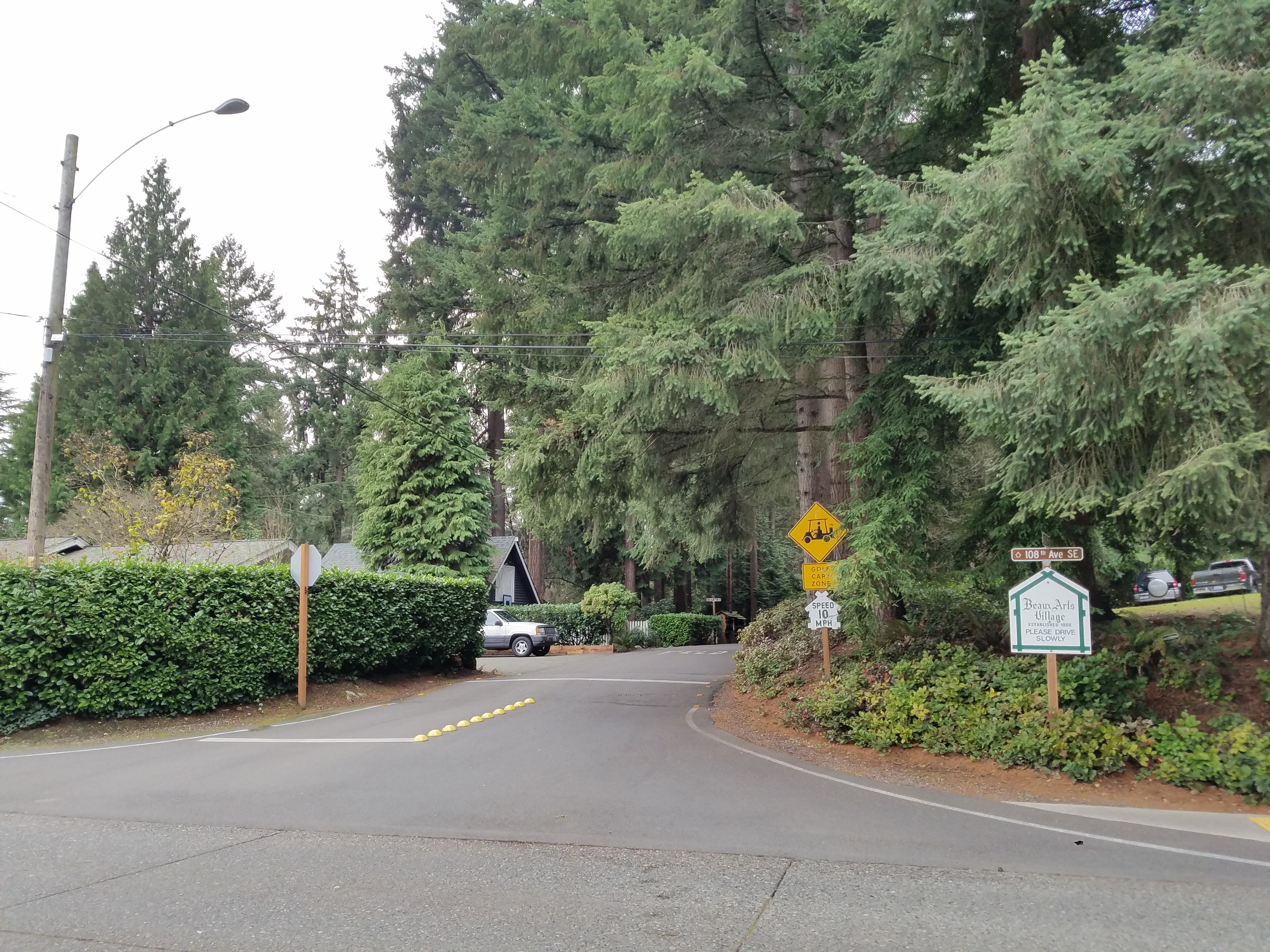
- Entrance and welcome sign to Beaux Arts Village, pictured in 2019
- Interactive map of Beaux Arts Village, Washington
- Location within Washington (state) Location within the United States
- Coordinates: 47°35′07″N 122°12′18″W
- Country: United States
- State: Washington
- County: King

Government
  - Mayor: Aletha Howes

Area
  - Total: 0.17 sq mi (0.43 km^{2})
  - Land: 0.081 sq mi (0.21 km^{2})
  - Water: 0.085 sq mi (0.22 km^{2})
- Elevation: 23 ft (7.0 m)

Population (2020)
  - Total: 317
  - Density: 3,924/sq mi (1,514.9/km^{2})
- Time zone: UTC−08:00 (Pacific (PST))
  - Summer (DST): UTC−07:00 (PDT)
- ZIP Code: 98004
- Area code: 425
- FIPS code: 53-04895
- GNIS feature ID: 2411673
- Website: beauxarts-wa.gov

Beaux Arts Village (/ˈboʊz ˈɑːrts/) is a town located in the Eastside region of King County, Washington, United States. It has a population of 317 as of the 2020 census and a land area of 0.1 sq mi.

The town, a suburb of Seattle and Bellevue, is one of the most affluent areas in the metropolitan area. Beaux Arts Village is among the least populated municipalities in King County.

== History ==
Beaux Arts Village was founded in 1908 as an artists' colony and named after the Western Academy of Beaux Arts to which its founders belonged. At the time, one could purchase membership in the Academy for $200 (today membership in the Academy comes with home ownership). The town was formally incorporated in 1954.

== Geography ==
Beaux Arts Village is located on the eastern shore of Lake Washington north of Interstate 90. The town is surrounded on the north, east, and south by the city of Bellevue, and on the west by Lake Washington. There is no town hall, with official town business meetings taking place in private homes. The meetings are open to the public.

According to the United States Census Bureau, the town has a total area of 0.17 square miles (0.44 km^{2}), of which, 0.09 square miles (0.23 km^{2}) is land and 0.08 square miles (0.21 km^{2}) is water.

The entire shoreline of the town is owned by the Western Academy of Beaux Arts, thus reserving use of the Lake Washington beach for residents and their guests only.

== Demographics ==
Historical population
Census	Pop.	Note	%±
1960	351		—
1970	475		35.3%
1980	328		−30.9%
1990	303		−7.6%
2000	307		1.3%
2010	299		−2.6%
2020	317		6.0%
2021 (est.)	311	▼	−1.9%
U.S. Decennial Census; 2015 Estimate

=== 2010 census ===
As of the 2010 census, there were 299 people, 113 households, and 88 families living in the town. The population density was 3,322.2 inhabitants per square mile (1,282.7/km^{2}). There were 118 housing units at an average density of 1,311.1 per square mile (506.2/km^{2}). The racial makeup of the town was 95.3% White, 4.0% Asian, and 0.7% from two or more races. Hispanic or Latino of any race were 1.0% of the population.

There were 113 households, of which 38.9% had children under the age of 18 living with them, 70.8% were married couples living together, 3.5% had a female householder with no husband present, 3.5% had a male householder with no wife present, and 22.1% were non-families. 20.4% of all households were made up of individuals, and 14.1% had someone living alone who was 65 years of age or older. The average household size was 2.65 and the average family size was 3.07.

The median age in the town was 44.9 years. 29.8% of residents were under the age of 18; 2.6% were between the ages of 18 and 24; 17.7% were from 25 to 44; 29.1% were from 45 to 64; and 20.7% were 65 years of age or older. The gender makeup of the town was 51.2% male and 48.8% female.

=== 2000 census ===
As of the 2000 census, there were 307 people, 117 households, and 94 families living in the town. The population density was 3,281.9 people per square mile (1,317.0/km^{2}). There were 124 housing units at an average density of 1,325.6 per square mile (532.0/km^{2}). The racial makeup of the town was 97.07% White, 0.33% Native American, 1.95% Asian, 0.33% Pacific Islander, and 0.33% from two or more races.

There were 117 households, out of which 33.1% had children under the age of 18 living with them, 70.2% were married couples living together, 5.0% had a female householder with no husband present, and 22.3% were non-families. 16.5% of all households were made up of individuals, and 11.6% had someone living alone who was 65 years of age or older. The average household size was 2.54 and the average family size was 2.85.

In the town, the population was spread out, with 22.1% under the age of 18, 4.9% from 18 to 24, 17.9% from 25 to 44, 35.5% from 45 to 64, and 19.5% who were 65 years of age or older. The median age was 49 years. For every 100 females, there were 99.4 males. For every 100 females aged 18 and over, there were 92.7 males.

The median income for a household in the town was $96,916, and the median income for a family was $110,038. Males had a median income of $81,760 versus $41,250 for females. The per capita income for the town was $56,496. About 4.0% of families and 4.2% of the population were below the poverty line, including 4.6% of those under the age of 18 and 2.9% of those 65 or over.

== Government and politics ==
Presidential Elections Results
Year	Republican	Democratic	Third Parties
2020	24.07% 58	71.78% 173	4.15% 10

Beaux Arts Village is a town operating under a mayor–council form of government. The town council has five at-large positions and a mayor who presides over all meetings. The mayor and council members are unpaid volunteers who serve four year terms without term limits. The terms are staggered and elected in odd years.

The town has no town hall. As a result, the mayor and council members take turns hosting meetings in their personal homes.

Beaux Arts Village currently contracts with the King County Sheriff's Office for law enforcement services. For fire services, Beaux Arts Village contracts out to the Bellevue Fire Department. Deaths are handled through the King County Medical Examiner's Office.

In the 2004 US presidential election, Beaux Arts Village cast 63.08% of its vote for Democrat John Kerry.

== Education ==
The town is in the Bellevue School District. Pupils in Beaux Arts Village attend Enatai Elementary School, Chinook Middle School, and Bellevue High School.

== Notable people ==
- Frank Calvert (1876–1940), cartoonist, co-founded Beaux Art Village
- Alfred T. Renfro (1877–1964), artist, co-founded Beaux Art Village

== See also ==
- Beaux-Arts architecture
- Beaux Arts Trio
