= John Hager (cartoonist) =

American cartoonist

John "Dok" Hager
- Caricature of Hager, done by one of the members of the Seattle Cartoonists' Club for the club's 1911 book about famous Seattleites.
- Born: June 29, 1858; Terre Haute, Indiana
- Died: June 14, 1932 (aged 73); Seattle, Washington
- Education: Attended college in Germany or Zurich, Switzerland
- Occupations: Dentist, newspaper cartoonist
- Years active: Cartoonist from 1909 to 1925
- Employer: Seattle Daily Times
- Notable work: The Umbrella Man aka Weather Man; Dok's Dippy Duck
- Spouse: Anna Hyde
- Children: Carrie Hager (1883-1895) Luther George Hager (1885- ) Mary Hager (1892-1950) John Hyde Hager (1894-1927)
- Parent(s): Jacob H. Hager (father); Carrie Ross (mother)
- Awards: Life acknowledged on front page of Seattle Daily Times in obituary.

John Ross "Dok" Hager (June 29, 1858 – June 14, 1932) was an American cartoonist for the Seattle Daily Times, creator of a daily comic accompanying the weather report, and the comic strip Dok's Dippy Duck. Hager's nickname stems from his time as a dentist in Terre Haute, Indiana before he moved to Seattle, Washington in 1889 and began working for the Seattle Times. Hager retired in 1925 due to blindness.

In Seattle he was known as a weatherman and for his commentaries (using a cartoon of the Umbrella Man and of a talking duck).

== Background ==
He was the son of Jacob H. Hager and Carrie Ross of Terre Haute, Indiana. Before moving to Indiana, his family had lived in Hagerstown, Maryland. He married Anna Hyde, who gave him four children. Two of his children were alive when he died.

After he attended school in Europe (his obituary says Germany, but his passport application said Zurich, Switzerland), he set up as a dentist in Terre Haute. He moved to Seattle in 1889, where he continued as a dentist. in 1909 he began cartooning full-time with the Seattle Daily Times and gave up his practice.

=== Son George Hager ===
His son, George Hager was also an artist in Seattle, working as an illustrator for the town's rival newspaper, The Seattle Post-Intelligencer. He also edited children's page for the Christian Science Monitor George Hager studied art at the University of Washington and the Arts Student League in New York, where another Seattle cartoonist, William Charles McNulty taught. Both Hagers participated in the Seattle Cartoonists' Club, contributing caricatures of the famous men of Seattle for the club's book, The Cartoon; A Reference Book of Seattle's Successful Men.

== Cartoons ==
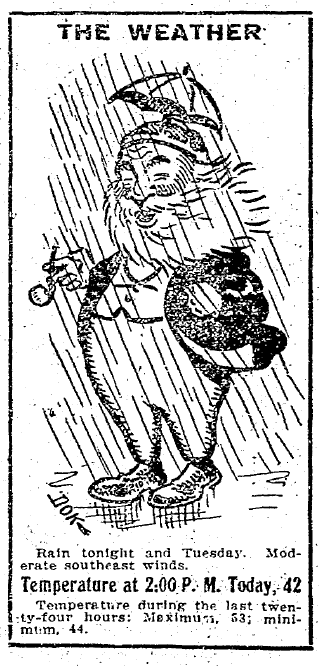
Doc Hager's first Umbrella Man cartoon, to illustrate the weather November 1, 1909 in the Seattle Daily Times.

=== Umbrella Man and the Kid ===
==== Umbrella Man ====
Beginning November 1, 1909, Dok created a daily cartoon to accompany The Weather, which featured a character who came to be known as the Umbrella Man, or "Sport". In the newspaper on May 3, 1913, the weather comic was called The Umbrella Man, in a front–page box naming the paper's features. Later on, as Dok began to do more cartooning, he gave Sport a sidekick, named the Kid.

==== The Kid ====
The Kid was a talking duck. He was not part of the Dippy Duck or The Waddles cartoon strips, but was the sidekick to the Umbrella Man. He became a regular feature on the front page of The Seattle Times. Like the Umbrella Man, the Kid sometimes sported an umbrella hat. The two wandered the streets of Seattle in the comic, dispensing wit and wisdom along with weather forecasts.

=== Other cartoon ducks ===
==== Dok's Dippy Duck ====
Sample of Dok's Dippy Duck from the Seattle Daily Times, February 11, 1915. The comic strip ran on the first page. At the time the strip was dealing with the tensions in Europe and World War I.

DOK's comic strip, Dok's Dippy Duck started out as a daily comic strip without a name, May 31, 1912. In the early strip, the unnamed duck stood around on the street corner picking fights with whomever passed by. Doc's duck became a traveler during World War I and the cartoons show him interacting with both sides of the conflict. The duck in this cartoon is also known as The Kid.

On May 3, 1913, in a front-page box called "Features of Today's Paper", Dok's cartoon was called "The Duck. By Dok."

On February 10, 1915, the strip was named Dok's Dippy Duck with no change in what was happening in the plot; the February 10 strip addressed what had happened in the previous day's strip. One change that did happen was to make the comic vertical and larger, with fewer frames; it had only four frames, where earlier strips had as many as seven.

This cartoon has been characterized by a comic historian as one of the pioneers of humanized animal comic strips.

==== The Kid becomes Waddles ====
By the time that the artists of the Seattle Cartoonists' Club put together their book The Cartoon; A Reference Book of Seattle's Successful Men, the Kid was well enough known to be included in the book without the Umbrella Man. Other area cartoonists had a regular commentary animal, and the public recognized the talking duck as being Dok's.

Waddles was a duck drawn by George Hager for the Christian Science Monitor in the cartoon strip The Adventures of the Waddles. According to the Seattle Daily Times, Waddles was a continuation of his father's duck, associated with the weather man. Dok had to discontinue his illustrating when his eyes went, and his children ran the Waddles comic strip. Dok's daughter, Mrs. George Dearborn wrote the rhyming lines to go with the cartoon, while son George Hager did the illustration.

== Books ==
- The Umbrella Man by Dok. Lowman and Hanford Company, Seattle, Washington, 1911.
- Sport and the Kid by Hager, J.R. "Doc". Lowman and Hanford Company, Seattle, Washington, 1913.
- The Cartoon; A Reference Book of Seattle's Successful Men, Frank Calvert (ed.), Metropolitan Press, Seattle, 1911. Online text

== See also ==
- Bill Blackbeard and Martin Williams, The Smithsonian Collection of Newspaper Comics, 1977.
