= Zola Helen Ross =

American novelist (1912–1989)

Zola Helen Ross (May 9, 1912 – November 14, 1989) (née Girdey) was an American Pacific Northwest writer. She also taught writing and co-founded the Pacific Northwest Writers Association with Lucile Saunders McDonald of The Seattle Times. She wrote in various genres, including adventure, children's fiction, crime, mystery, and suspense. She was also the author of several Western historical novels; her male counterpart was Louis L'Amour. The Pacific Northwest and the Great Basin are the settings for her stories, and they include the towns of Reno, San Francisco, and Seattle. Ross occasionally wrote under the pseudonyms Helen Arre and Bert Iles. She taught writing at the University of Washington and the Lake Washington schools in Kirkland, Washington. She was married to William Frank Ross, and lived in Seattle, Washington.

== Selected publications ==
- (1946) Three Down Vulnerable
- (1947) Overdue For Death
- (1948) One Corpse Missing
- (1949) Bonanza Queen
- (1950) Tonopah Lady
- (1951) Reno Crescent
- (1952) The Green Land
- (1954) Cassy Scandal
- (1955) The Golden Witch
- (1956) A Land To Tame
- (1957) Spokane Saga

=== Using pseudonym Helen Arre ===
- (1953) The Corpse By The River
- (1954) No Tears At The Funeral
- (1956) Write It Murder
- (1958) The Golden Shroud
- (1960) Murder By The Book

=== Using pseudonym Bert Iles ===
- (1956) Murder In Mink

=== Co-authored with McDonald ===
- (1950) The mystery of Castesby Island
- (1952) Stormy year
- (1954) Fridays̓ child
- (1956) Mystery of the long house
- (1956) Pigtail pioneer
- (1957) Wing Harbor
- (1958) The courting of Ann Maria
- (1959) Assignment in Ankara
- (1961) Winter's answer
- (1959) The stolen letters
- (1968) The sunken forest
