= Edward Giddings =

American architect

Edward Paul Giddings (1929–1993) was an American architect and painter based in Southern California and Mexico.

== Biography ==
=== Early life ===
Edward Giddings was born in Seattle, Washington in 1929. He graduated from the University of Washington. He also studied painting at the California School of Fine Arts in San Francisco, California.

=== Career ===
He started his career as a draftsman for architectural firms. In 1960, he met a real estate developer while on vacation in Puerto Vallarta and started designing homes there.

By 1965, he established his own architectural firm in Newport Beach and designed mansions for the affluent. He also designed the private residence of actor David Janssen (1931–1980). Moreover, he designed and developed a gorgeous resort called Club Cascadas de Baja, which is located in Cabo San Lucas, Mexico. He also developed a resort called Ocho Cascadas in Puerto Vallarta.

As a painter, he exhibited his work in museums and art galleries in Laguna Beach, La Jolla in San Diego, San Bernardino and Santa Barbara.

=== Personal life ===
In 1952 he married Caroline Mather Helgesen, a fellow art student at the California School of Fine Arts in San Francisco. They had three children, Jolene, Ana, and John. He later was married to Patricia Cropsey, an interior designer from New York. They had three sons, Mark, Greg, and David. He died at his vacation home in Cabo San Lucas on August 5, 1994, of a heart attack. He was 64.

== Bibliography ==
=== Secondary sources ===
- Michael McFadden, Julius Shulman, James Toland, Edward Paul Giddings Art and Architecture of Passion, Giddings Publishing, 1999.
