= Purple Mark =

Fashion personality in Seattle, US

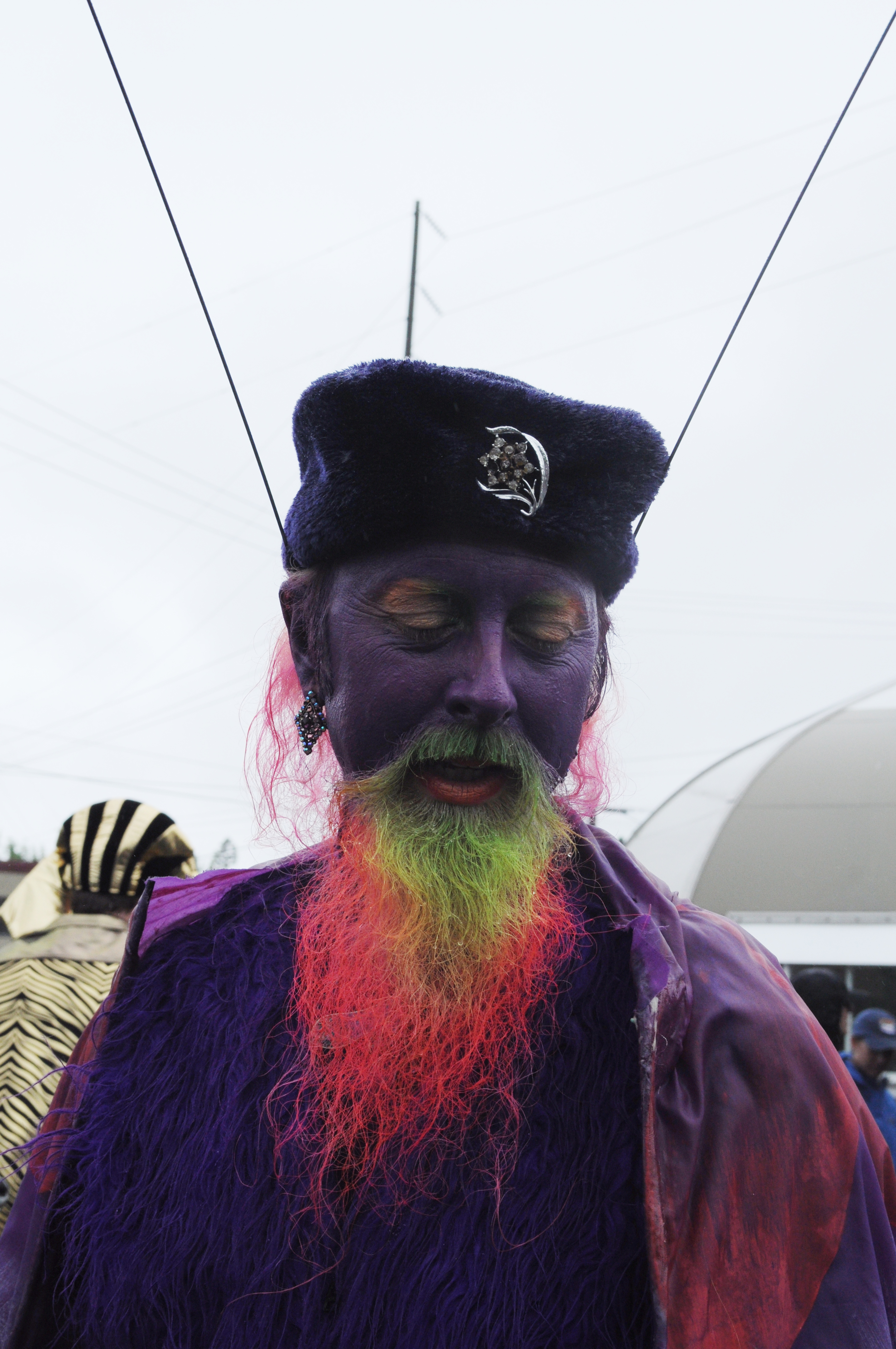
Purple Mark at the 2011 Fremont Solstice Parade

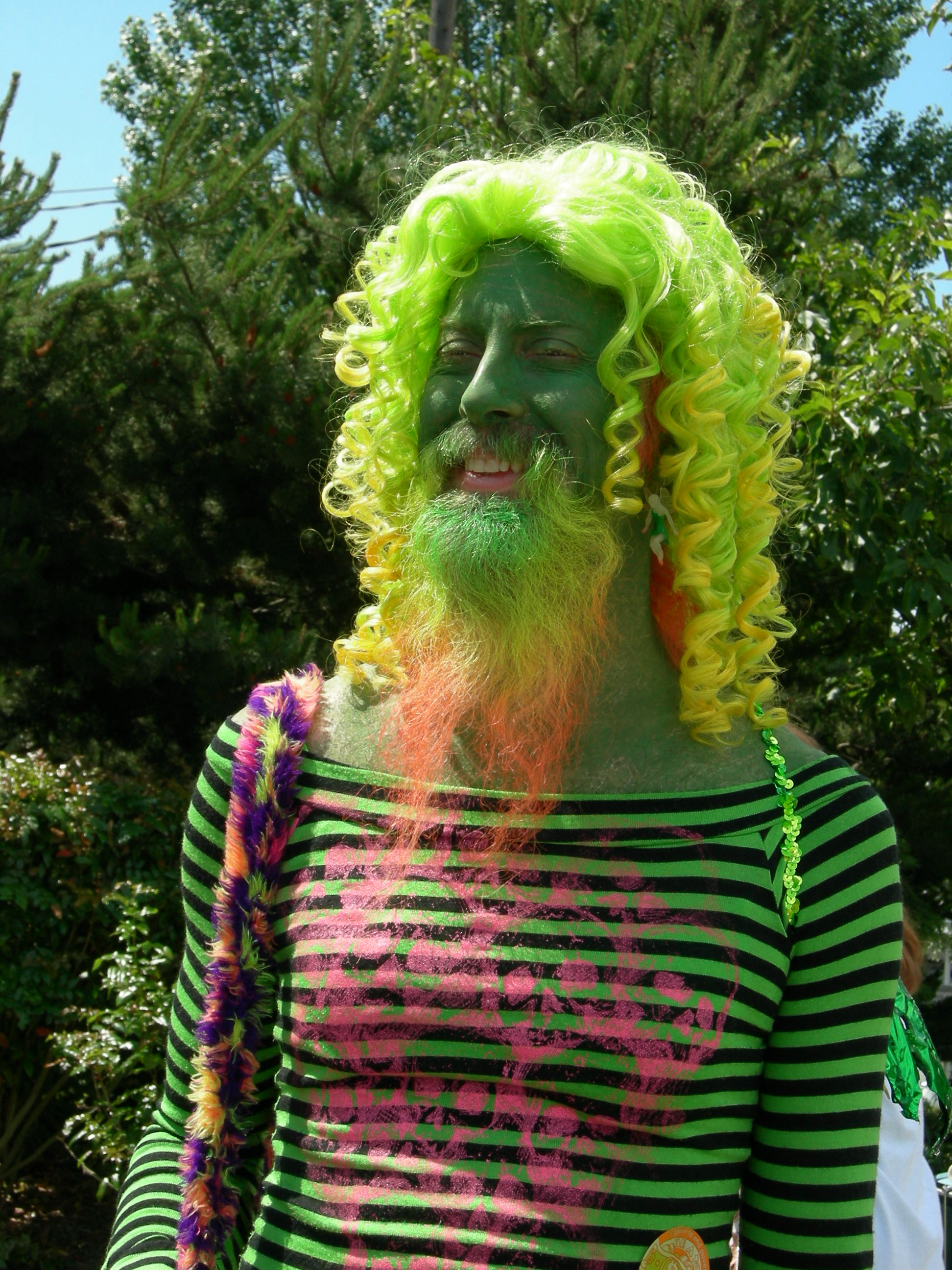
Purple Mark at the 2007 Fremont Solstice Parade, wearing a wig

Mark Wirth, better known as Purple Mark, is a Seattle, Washington resident who has become locally known, especially around the Capitol Hill neighborhood where he lives, for his colorful attire and his equally colorful dyed hair and beard. He has been quoted as saying, "So many people are against color, so many people are afraid to live."

== Description ==
Purple Mark usually dresses and dyes his hair, beard and other hair on his body, such as eyebrows and arm hair, in accord with the cycle of the seasons: blue and purple in the winter, then when the weather warms up green, yellow, and orange, then red in the autumn before cycling back to his winter colors. The process of applying the dye takes about four hours when he changes color, with two hours every two weeks for touch-up for "vibrancy." He also attempts to eat and drink along a similar pattern of color.

By his own account, the name "Purple Mark" predates his colorful self-presentation, dating back to when he was hit by a purple streak of lightning on Mount Sneffels in Colorado at age 11. He has said he was first influenced to dye his hair by the wild styles he saw around Pike Place Market, but soon went well beyond the street fashion of the time to develop his unique look. On another occasion he explained his rainbow tones as originally springing from observation of the sun's rays coming through his eyelids: "Your vision attempts to correct this color to white, and some hair had fallen across my eyes, so when I opened them, my hair appeared bright green. I thought to myself: 'I'm gonna do that.'"

From 1994 to at least 2007, he worked in the Ballard neighborhood in an assembly line job at motor oil and fuel additives company Bardahl.

Most of his wardrobe is purchased second-hand or made by himself. He brings a variety of techniques to making his own outfits, ranging from dying human-hair wigs to metalsmithing, in which he has a degree.

== See also ==
- The Great Morgani
