= Alfred T. Renfro =

American cartoonist

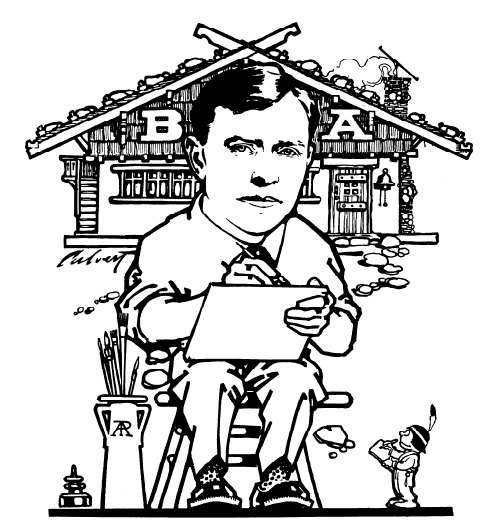
- Renfro as caricatured by Frank Calvert
- Born: October 13, 1877; Alabama
- Died: September 8, 1964 (aged 86); Santa Barbara, California

Signature
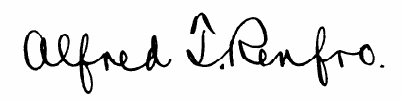

Alfred T. Renfro (October 13, 1877 – September 8, 1964) was an artist, editorial cartoonist, photographer and architect who lived in Santa Barbara, California and Seattle, Washington.

He made efforts to help establish an arts colony near Seattle, Washington, and was a co-founder of the Beaux Arts Village. He worked for the Seattle times as an art director and editorial cartoonist and was a member of the Seattle Cartoonists' Club. He contributed many illustrations to the club's book, The Cartoon; A Reference Book of Seattle's Successful Men, along with his friend Frank Calvert, who copyrighted the book.

Illustrated for the Yukon Sun in Dawson City, Alaska, and for all the Seattle papers. In Seattle he contributed most to the "Scripps papers", which would have included the Seattle Star.

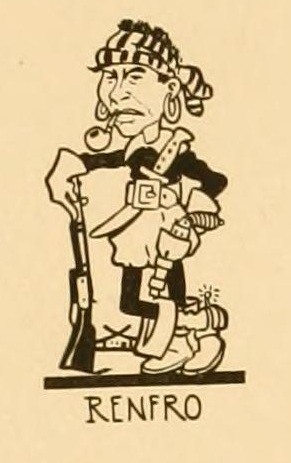
Caricature of Alfred T. Renfro as a pirate. Members of the Seattle Artists club drew themselves in this manner, alongside the serious and famous Seattleites they were portraying.

== Works ==
- The Cartoon; A Reference Book of Seattle's Successful Men, Frank Calvert (ed.), Metropolitan Press, Seattle, 1911. Online text
- 12th Session of the Washington State Legislature by Alfred T. Renfro, with illustrations by W. C. McNulty (Von-A), W. C. Morris, and Frank Calvert. Three of the cartoonists again included sketches of themselves. Online text
