= Edwin Frederick Brotze =

American cartoonist

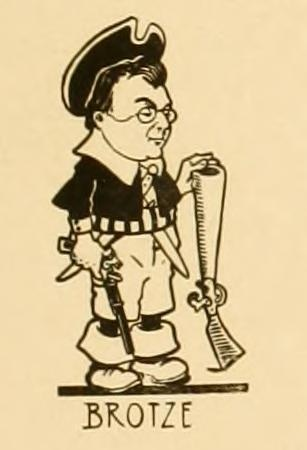
- Caricature of Edwin Frederick Brotze, done by one of the members of the Seattle Cartoonists' Club for the club's 1911 book about famous Seattleites.
- Born: May 28, 1868; San Antonio, Texas, U.S.
- Died: December 6, 1939 (aged 71); Seattle, Washington, U.S.
- Known for: editorial cartoons, drawing

Edwin Frederick Brotze (1868–1939) was a newspaper illustrator and editorial cartoonist. He grew up in California, where he went to St Mary's College in Moraga. He worked in newspapers in Chicago (c. 1900) and Los Angeles (c. 1900 to 1905) and in 1906 ended up in Seattle, where he worked for The Seattle Times until his death. He was known for his caricatures and editorial cartoons.

He participated in the making of three different cartoon vanity books. It was fashionable around the turn of the century for the wealthy to have themselves caricatured or drawn in books, in the style of the editorial cartoons, as a sign of importance. He participated in Californians as We See Them, a Volume of Cartoons and Caricatures (1906), Oregonians "As We See Em," Cartoon and Caricatures of Portland Citizens (1906), and The Cartoon; A Reference Book of Seattle's Successful Men (1911). The last book was done as a member of the Seattle Cartoonists' Club.
