= Paul Renkert =

American soccer player

Personal information
- Date of birth: February 7, 1957 (age 69)
- Place of birth: Seattle, Washington, U.S.
- Position: Forward

Senior career*
| Years | Team | Apps | (Gls) |
| 1976–1977 | Seattle Sounders | 1 | (0) |
| 1978–1980 | California Sunshine | | |
| 1980–1981 | Denver Avalanche (indoor) | 25 | (5) |
- * Club domestic league appearances and goals

Paul Renkert is an American retired soccer forward who played professionally in the North American Soccer League, Major Indoor Soccer League, American Soccer League.

Renkert graduated from Newport High School. In 1976, Renkert signed with the Seattle Sounders of the North American Soccer League. He spent the 1976 season on the reserve squad then played one game during the 1977 season. On March 30, 1979, Renkert joined the California Sunshine of the North American Soccer League. In the fall of 1980, he moved to the Denver Avalanche of the Major Indoor Soccer League.
