= Sunday Nobody =

American meme and prank artist

- Born: 1993 or 1994 (age 32–33)
- Occupations: Meme and prank artist

Instagram information
- Page: sunday.nobody.art
- Followers: 896 thousand

TikTok information
- Page: Sunday Nobody Art
- Years active: 2021–present
- Followers: 458 thousand

YouTube information
- Channel: Sunday Nobody
- Years active: 2024–present
- Subscribers: 327 thousand
- Views: 88 million
- Last updated: March 28, 2026

Sunday Nobody (born 1993/1994) is an American meme and prank artist.

In 2022, Sunday Nobody spent $1,000 and hand-built a sarcophagus, putting a small bag of Flamin' Hot Cheetos inside the sarcophagus, leaving it to be opened again in 10,000 years. According to The Guardian, he said that "there’s nothing else I'd really want to spend my money on, other than completing a project of this nature".

In 2024, The New York Times named Sunday Nobody "the next Banksy". The artist as also been referred to as the "always-online answer to Banksy".

In 2025, he spent $25,000 to create a bronze statue of a combination of Discobolus and Handsome Squidward from the Nickelodeon animated television series Spongebob Squarepants. He sank the statue nine meters deep in the Mediterranean Sea, sinking it to be discovered by archeologists in the future.

In 2026, he held a funeral for a closed Taco Bell. The ceremony included bagpipes, a crying contest, a 21-bell salute. Guests were required to wear formal attire, and many brought gifts and "tokens of condolence". He had previously traveled to China to hand-cast bronze statues of Taco Bell bags and Baja Blast soda cups. Some were given away as prizes for contest winners at the funeral, while the majority were sold through his website.
