= Robert W. Patten =

American eccentric (1832–1913)

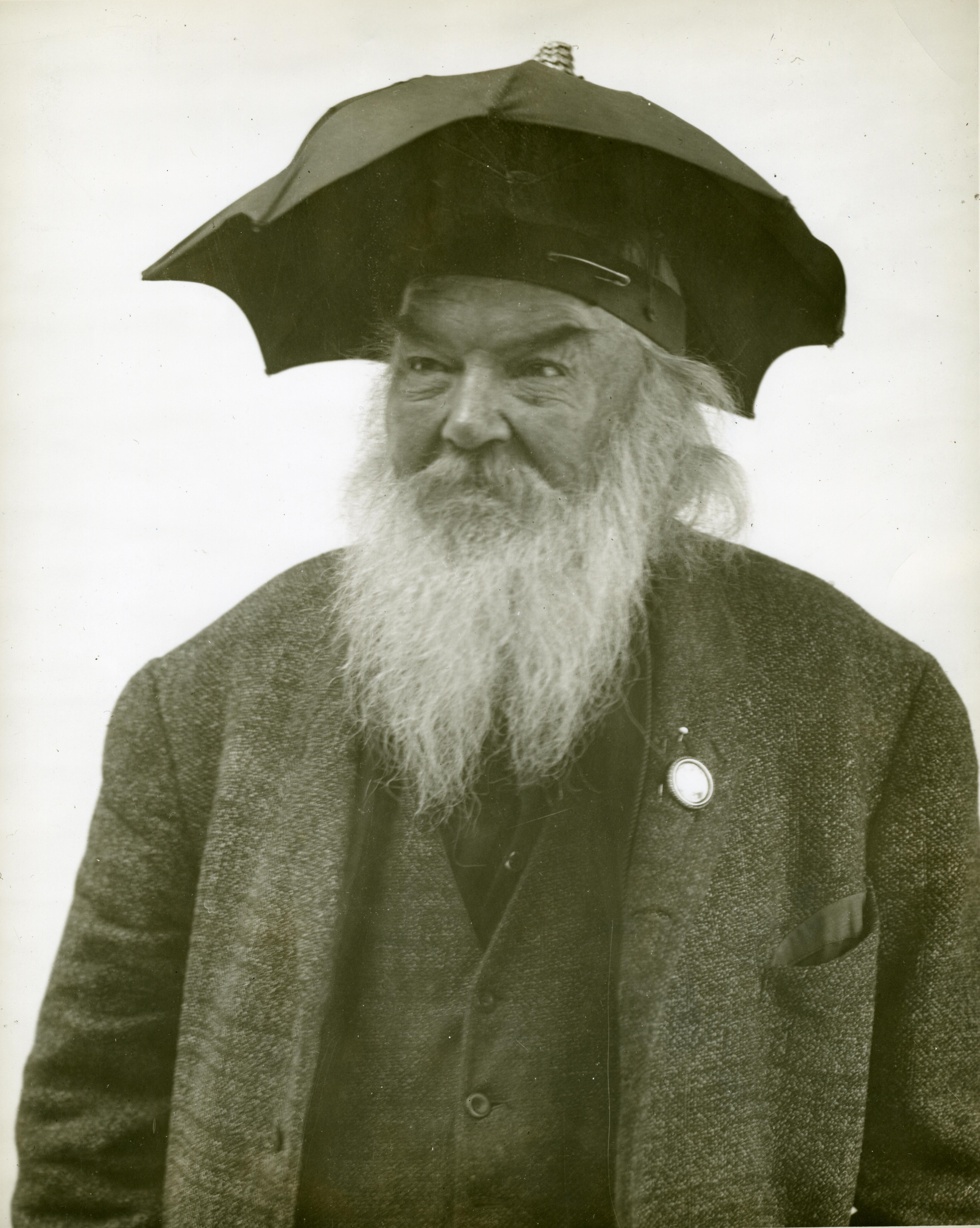
- Wearing his Umbrella Hat, circa 1890-1910.
- Born: February 24, 1832; New York
- Died: April 19, 1913 (aged 80–81); U.S. National Home for Disabled Volunteer Soldiers, California
- Occupation: watchmaker
- Known for: fantastic stories; being the object of a popular Seattle cartoon
- Relatives: Elizabeth Patten (wife)

Robert W. Patten (1832–1913) was an American eccentric from Seattle, Washington. Few people in Seattle knew much about his past and he was seen as eccentric because of his lifestyle and outrageous claims. He lived on a houseboat, walked around town with an umbrella on his head, and spent most of his time outdoors. He claimed to have been a significant historical figure in his own right rating alongside Buffalo Bill and Kit Carson.

He did become a historical figure in a different way, as a recognized part of Seattle's cultural landscape, especially after cartoonist Dok Hager created a daily comic featuring his image. He was known as Old Sport or the Umbrella Man.

== The man ==
Born in New York in 1832, Robert W. Patten served in the Civil War, from which he drew a small pension. While prospecting in Mexico, he devised his signature hat with an umbrella mounted atop and mosquito netting tucked within.

Coming to Seattle in 1890, Patten told many colorful tales of early life. He claimed that he was born in 1811, ran away from home at age nine, was adopted by Winnebago Chief Big John, and romanced the chief's daughter. Later (he said) he scouted with Kit Carson and saved John Fremont from death, for which heroics (he said) Abraham Lincoln made him Chief Scout of the Army, and that he later gave up the position to Buffalo Bill. As to the veracity of his claims, it may be said that the evidence is scanty.

Patten lived on a Lake Union houseboat and supported himself by fishing and doing odd jobs.

Patten was well enough known that when he had a stroke in 1910, he made the front page of the Seattle Daily Times. The Times also ran a story on his life in the Old Soldiers' Home in Los Angeles. Papers in San Jose and Seattle ran stories which documented his bigger–than–life claims.

=== Military service ===
Patten was a Civil War Veteran. He served with the 3rd Wisconsin Infantry and was discharged July 14, 1864. According to the veteran's home record, he contracted rheumatism in Maryland in 1862, along with a general disability. These gave him disabled status and allowed him into the Old Soldier's Home.

== The cartoon ==
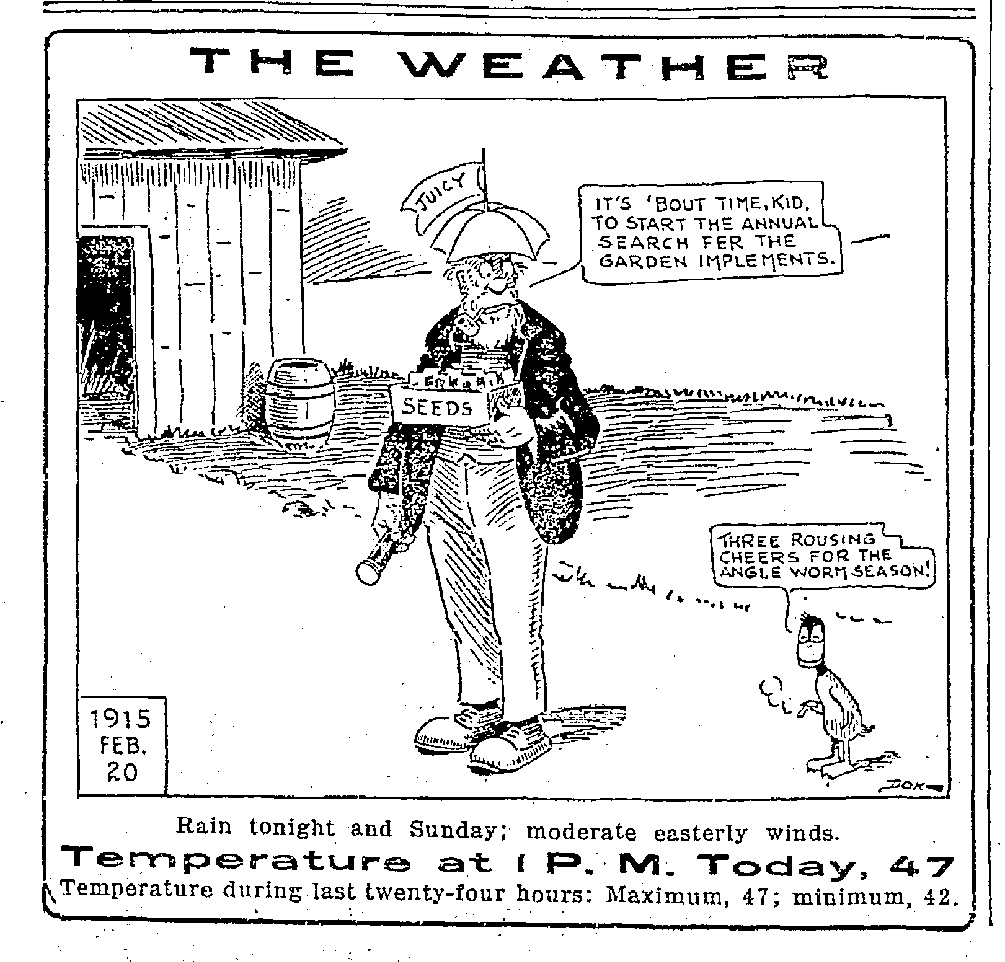
Commentary on spring and the weather by DOK's Weatherman and his sidekick. This was the normal look for the cartoon.

Beginning in 1909, cartoonist John Ross "Dok" Hager drew a daily cartoon of Patten for the front page of Seattle Daily Times, calling him "'Sport". With his duck sidekick named the "Kid" (who also sometimes sported an umbrella hat), the cartoon Umbrella Man dispensed wit and wisdom along with weather forecasts on the newspaper's front page. Sometimes he reflected the paper's owner's opinion, as on July 20, 1913, when he was drawn leaving town to avoid trouble with the Wobblies.

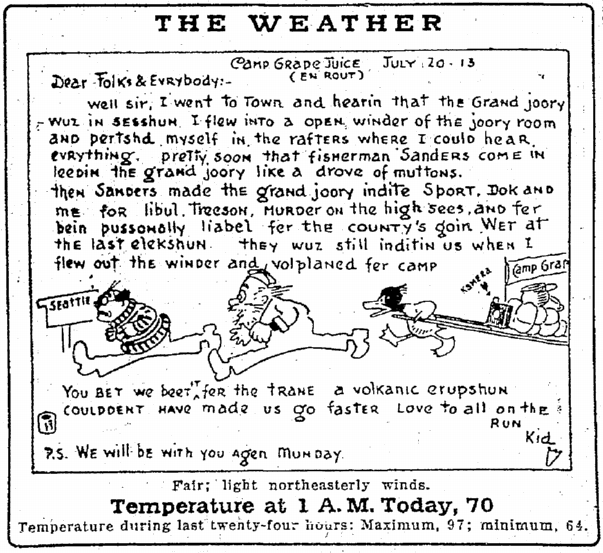
DOC caricatured himself in this cartoon, with his cartoon figures Sport (the Weatherman) and the Kid (the duck) leaving town, as if scared of the Wobblies.

== Books ==
The Umbrella Man was the subject of two books of collected comics and witticisms:

- The Umbrella Man by Dok. Lowman and Hanford Company, Seattle, Washington, 1911.
- Sport and the Kid by Hager, J.R. "Dok". Lowman and Hanford Company, Seattle, Washington, 1913.

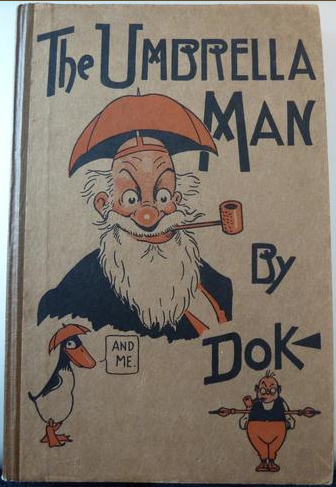
1911 Cartoon book The Umbrella Man by John "Dok" Hager. Not a collection of previously published artwork, but new comics, made for the book.
