= Frank Calvert (cartoonist) =

American cartoonist

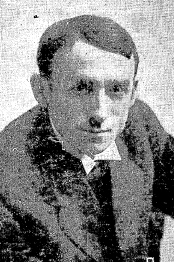
- Portrait of Frank Calvert c. 1920, from the Seattle Daily Times, July 1, 1920, page 14.
- Born: 1876
- Died: 1920 (aged 43–44); Oroville, Washington
- Citizenship: USA
- Occupations: Editorial cartoonist and newspaper illustrator, entrepreneur
- Spouse: Laura Reynolds (married January 7, 1905)
- Children: three children
- Relatives: William Calvert (father); Mrs William Calvert Sr. (mother); William Calvert Jr.(brother); James H. Calvert (brother); May Calvert Dunn (sister, died 1901); Grace Calvert (sister)
- Writing career
- Language: English
- Notable works: The Cartoon; A Reference Book of Seattle's Successful Men

Frank Calvert (1876–1920) was a Seattle Times newspaper artist and cartoonist, and member of the Seattle Cartoonists' Club. In 1911, he edited a book for the club, The cartoon; a reference book of Seattle's successful men, which included biographies, photos and caricatures of men the club considered influential in Seattle.

He was also a co-founder (along with Alfred T. Renfro, writer and photographer) of the Beaux Arts Village in King County, Washington. The two men wanted to create a community of artists. They bought 50 acres of land on the shore of Lake Washington, with the intent of establishing an artists' colony. They set aside 10 acres to be used for art studios for woodworking, sculpture, and photography and the rest was to be half-acre parcels for artist homes.

The two men also set up the Beaux Arts Workshop in Seattle.

Caricature of Frank Calvert as a pirate. Members of the Seattle Artists club drew themselves in this manner, alongside the serious and famous men they were portraying.

== Works ==
- The Cartoon; A Reference Book of Seattle's Successful Men, Frank Calvert (ed.), Metropolitan Press, Seattle, 1911.
- Homes and Gardens of the Pacific Coast, Volume 1, Seattle, Frank Calvert (editor) and T. Ross Ditty (associate editor), Beaux Arts Society Publishers, Beaux Arts Village, Washington, 1913
- Homes and Gardens of the Pacific Coast, Volume 2, Los Angeles, Frank Calvert (editor) and T. Ross Ditty (associate editor), Beaux Arts Society Publishers, Beaux Arts Village, Washington, 1913 (First page only)
- 12th Session of the Washington State Legislature by Alfred T. Renfro, with illustrations by W. C. McNulty (Von-A), W. C. Morris, and Frank Calvert.
- Songs o' the Sound by Alice Harriman with illustrations by Frank Calvert, The Stuff Printing Concern, Seattle, 1906.
