= William Charles McNulty =

American cartoonist

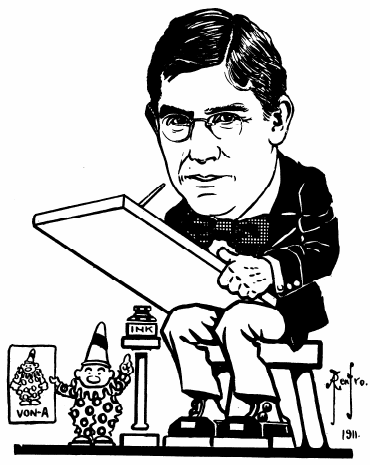
- Editorial cartoon-style portrait of VON–A, also known as William Charles McNulty, done by Alfred T. Renfro, fellow member of the Seattle Cartoonists' Club for a 1911 book about Washington legislators. He used the clown in his cartoons as a character who could make commentary.
- Born: 1884; Ogden, Utah Territory
- Died: 1963 (aged 78–79); Gloucester, Massachusetts, U.S.
- Education: Art Students League
- Known for: editorial cartoon illustrator, drawing, engraving
- Movement: Urban realism
- Spouses: Ann Brockman (died 1943) Beah Gellman (m. 1945)

William Charles McNulty (1884–1963) was an American artist, who created realistic etchings and drawings of New York. He was born in Ogden, Utah Territory. He studied art in 1908 and 1909 at the Art Students League in New York, where he also later taught. He was a successful editorial cartoonist for the Seattle Star. Works by McNulty are housed in the permanent collections of the Metropolitan Museum of Art, the New York Public Library, the Newark, Detroit and Whitney Museums, the U.S. Library of Congress and the University of Nebraska.

McNulty started as a newspaper artist in Nebraska and Montana, but wasn't content to stay there. In New York, he studied at the league between 1907 and 1909. After returning to the journalism field, going to New Orleans and Seattle, he took up printmaking under the encouragement of Joseph Pennell, founder of the graphic arts department at the Art Students League. He worked in the League and was exhibiting prints by 1927. He had prints included in the first International Exhibition of Etching organized by the Art Institute of Chicago in 1932, and the institute continued to display his work until 1946.

In 1931, he began teach at the Art Students League. His work was part of the painting event in the art competition at the 1932 Summer Olympics. He taught until 1958. He died of a heart ailment in Addison Gilbert Hospital in Gloucester, MA, at the age of seventy-nine on September 26, 1963.

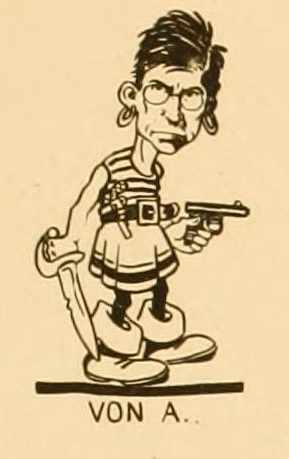
Caricature of VON-A, signature for William Charles McNulty when he was illustrating for the Seattle Star. The artists included these caricatures of themselves in their book about famous Seattleites.

== Editorial cartoonist VON-A ==
McNulty had worked for newspapers around in Nebraska and Montana and in New Orleans and Seattle as an editorial cartoonist. Under the name Von-A he worked for the Seattle Star, and had illustrations printed in The Cartoon: A Reference Book of Seattle's Successful Men and the 12th Session of the Washington State Legislature. Both were vanity cartoon books, collaborations of Seattle area cartoonists from its big three newspapers, featuring the rich and powerful in caricature and newsroom editorial-style drawing. The two books represent work he did as a member of the Seattle Cartoonists' Club in 1911.

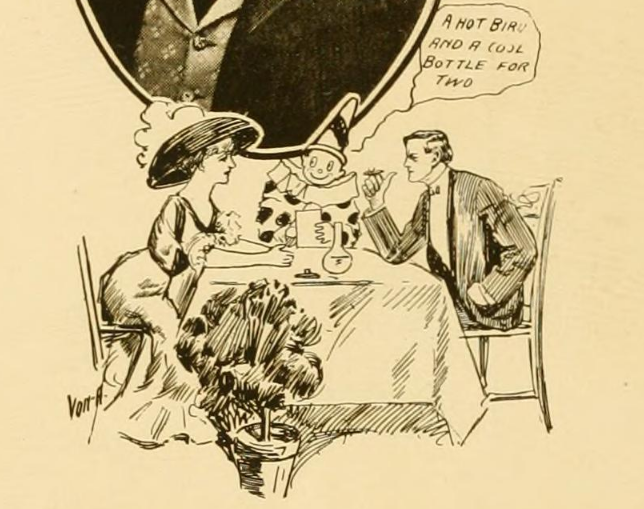
Editorial-style cartoon done by VON-A for the entry on Carl Schmitz in the book The Cartoon; A Reference Book of Seattle's Successful Men. The clown was McNulty's editorial device in his cartoons to make commentary on the world.

== See also ==
=== Editorial illustrations ===
- The Cartoon; A Reference Book of Seattle's Successful Men, Frank Calvert (ed.), Metropolitan Press, Seattle, 1911. Online text
- 12th Session of the Washington State Legislature by Alfred T. Renfro, with illustrations by W. C. McNulty (Von-A), W. C. Morris, and Frank Calvert. Three of the cartoonists again included sketches of themselves. Online text

=== Art ===
- Etchings.
- Smithsonian has one of his sketchbooks
- Graphite drawing, New York in the Fifties, 1931
- 1930 Etching, Brooklyn Bridge.
- Etching, Fifth Avenue Hotels.
- 1935 Etching, Fulton Market Docks.
- 1930 Etching, Men Working on Dock.
- 1935 Etching, New York From Stevens Institute.
- 1929 Etching, Woolworth Building New York.

=== Other ===
- Terra Foundation for American Art: McNulty biography
