= Mount Baker Tunnel =

Highway tunnels in Seattle, Washington, United States

- Mount Baker Ridge Tunnel
- U.S. National Register of Historic Places
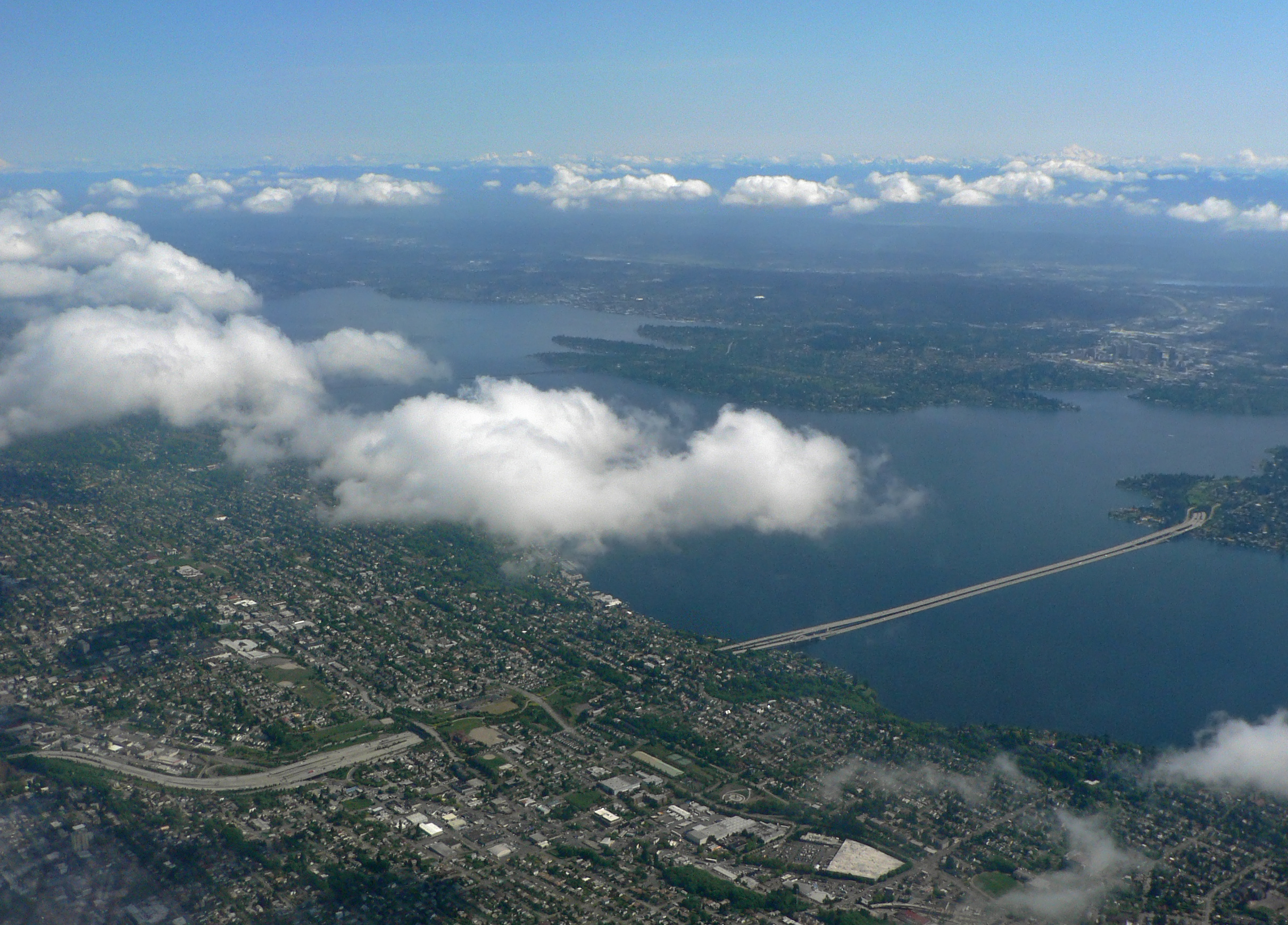
- View of the Mount Baker Tunnel and the Lacey V. Murrow and Homer M. Hadley Memorial Bridges from the southwest

- Location within Washington (state)
- Location: I-90, Seattle, Washington
- Coordinates: 47°35′25″N 122°17′55″W
- Built: 1940 (original; parallel tunnel built 1989)
- Architect: Bates & Rogers Construction Corp.
- Architectural style: Art Deco
- MPS: Historic Bridges/Tunnels in Washington State TR
- NRHP reference No.: 82004243
- Added to NRHP: July 16, 1982

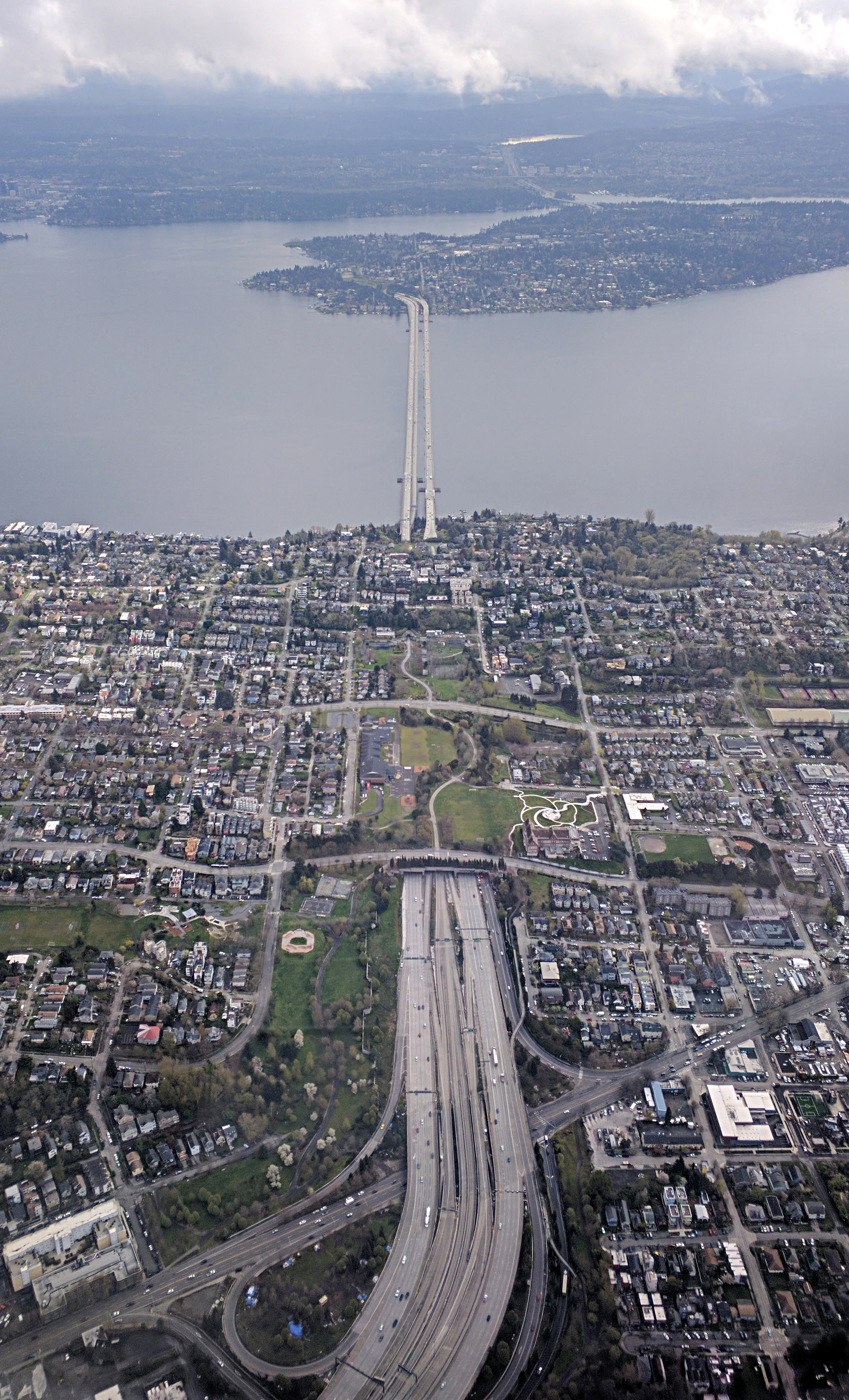
Aerial view of I-90 in Seattle, including the Mount Baker Tunnel and the two parallel bridges to Mercer Island: the Homer M. Hadley Memorial Bridge (left) and the Lacey V. Murrow Memorial Bridge (right)

The Mount Baker Tunnel or Mount Baker Ridge Tunnel carries Interstate 90 and Link light rail's 2 Line under the Mount Baker neighborhood of Seattle, Washington. It is actually a group of three tubes (or four—if counting the two original Mount Baker Tunnels separately) that carry eight lanes of freeway traffic, plus a separate path for bicycles and pedestrians, and two tracks for Link light rail. The original tubes are twin tunnel bores completed in 1940 and rehabilitated in 1993. The new Mount Baker Tunnel was built north of the original tunnels and opened in June 1989. The tunnel has a double-decked roadway with the bicycle/pedestrian path above the traffic lanes.

The tunnel was listed on the National Register of Historic Places in 1982 (ID #82004243). The east portals of the tunnel, with murals titled Portal of the North Pacific designed by artist James FitzGerald, along with the Lacey V. Murrow Bridge, are an official City of Seattle landmark.

The official length is 1,440 feet (440 m), though the perceived length while driving is closer to 3,300 feet (1,000 m) because of a cut-and-cover "lid" between the western portal and the beginning of the actual tunnel under the Mount Baker ridge. The former west portal, now located well inside the tunnel, is no longer discernible and its two arch structures were removed during 1989–1993 modification work. The eastern end of the tunnel links to the Lacey V. Murrow Memorial Bridge and the Homer M. Hadley Memorial Bridge (collectively the I-90 floating bridge) on Lake Washington, to Mercer Island.

At 63 feet (19 m) in diameter, it is the world's largest diameter soft earth tunnel, having been bored through clay.

== Configuration ==
=== Original ===
When completed in 1940, the twin tunnels connected the I-90 floating bridge on Lake Washington and Rainier Avenue South in Seattle. The bridge and tunnels were part of US Highway 10, which used surface streets between the tunnels and downtown Seattle. US 10 was a four-lane, undivided highway. Each tunnel held two traffic lanes. The north tunnel normally carried two westbound lanes. The south tunnel normally carried two eastbound lanes. In the 1960s, a lane-use signal system was added to improve peak commute traffic. During peak commute times, the signals were used to make the center two lanes reversible. In the mornings, three lanes flowed west and one lane flowed east. In the evenings, three lanes flowed east and one lane flowed west. During morning and evening commutes, one tunnel carried two lanes of traffic in the same direction while the other tunnel carried opposing traffic separated only by dashed yellow lines.

The highway would later become part of Interstate 90, be expanded, and upgraded to a controlled-access freeway. The freeway expansion and upgrade was completed in 1993.

=== 1983–1993 expansion ===
The expansion included construction of a new, parallel tunnel with a larger diameter, located north of the original tunnel. Construction began in 1983. When the overall I-90 project was completed in 1993, the twin 1940 tunnels would be connected to the southern I-90 floating bridge (the Lacey V. Murrow Memorial Bridge) and carry eastbound traffic only, while the 1989 tunnel would be connected to the northern floating bridge (the then-new Homer M. Hadley Memorial Bridge) and be westbound-only for general traffic.

The original pair of tunnels were each 29 feet (8.8 m) in diameter, while the new tunnel was 63 feet (19 m) in diameter. The new tunnel was built to carry traffic on three levels: two lanes for buses and carpools on the bottom level, three lanes of general traffic on the middle level, and cyclists and pedestrians on the top level. Excavation was completed in 1986, and the new tunnel opened to traffic in June 1989. Although designed to carry only westbound traffic, the new tunnel and then-new Homer Hadley Memorial Bridge temporarily carried all traffic—in both directions—when opened in 1989, while work continued on modifying the old Mercer Island Bridge where it connected to the 1940 Murrow Bridge and on rehabilitation of the latter.

The new tunnel opened to westbound traffic on June 4, 1989, and to eastbound traffic on June 23. On the latter date, the old tunnel and floating bridge closed to all traffic, for renovation that was originally expected to take three years. When a long section of the Murrow Bridge sank during a storm in 1990, the reopening was delayed by about one year, until 1993.

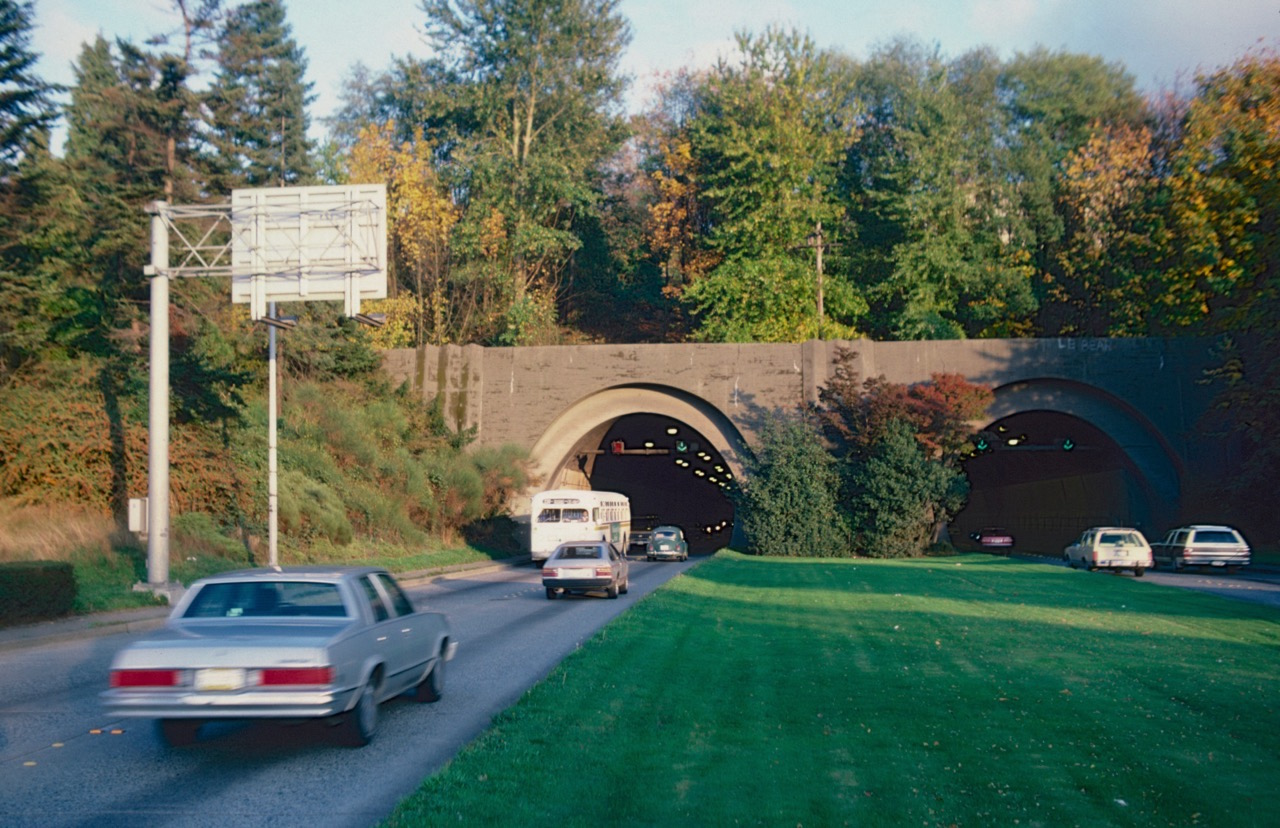
The former west portal in 1982. This afternoon-rush-hour view shows the reversible lanes in use, with one westbound lane and three eastbound.

With the reopening of the Murrow Bridge in 1993, the older Mount Baker Ridge tunnel also reopened, with all of its lanes now eastbound-only. Instead of carrying two traffic lanes in each tunnel, the reconfigured lanes in the twin 1940 tunnels comprised two lanes of eastbound traffic in the northern tunnel and one lane of eastbound traffic in the southern tunnel, and with pedestrians no longer permitted (because of the exclusive pedestrian and bicycle facilities now provided in the parallel new tunnel). A second eastbound lane was later reinstated in the northern tunnel. The reversible lanes in the older tunnels had been separated only by painted lines on the roadway surface, but the reversible lanes on the rebuilt and expanded freeway (which use only the newer, 1989 tunnel) are separated by concrete barriers, to improve safety.

The I-90 expansion project also effectively more than doubled the length of the Mt. Baker Tunnel. The west portal of the twin 1940 tunnels, which had been located near 29th Avenue South, was removed, and a 2,000-foot-long (610 m) concrete "lid" was built over the freeway, covering the section between the old west portal and west end of the lid, just west of 23rd Avenue South. However, officially the lid is not considered to be part of the tunnel, and a 1993 Historic American Engineering Record survey stated that the lengths of the two 1940 tunnels remain 1,466 feet (447 m) each. Inside the older tunnels, which had been arch-shaped, the ceiling and walls were made square/rectangle, matching the shape of the "lidded" section. (That is, except for the tunnel's opening, which remained arch-shaped.) Equipment to boost radio reception was added.

=== Current ===
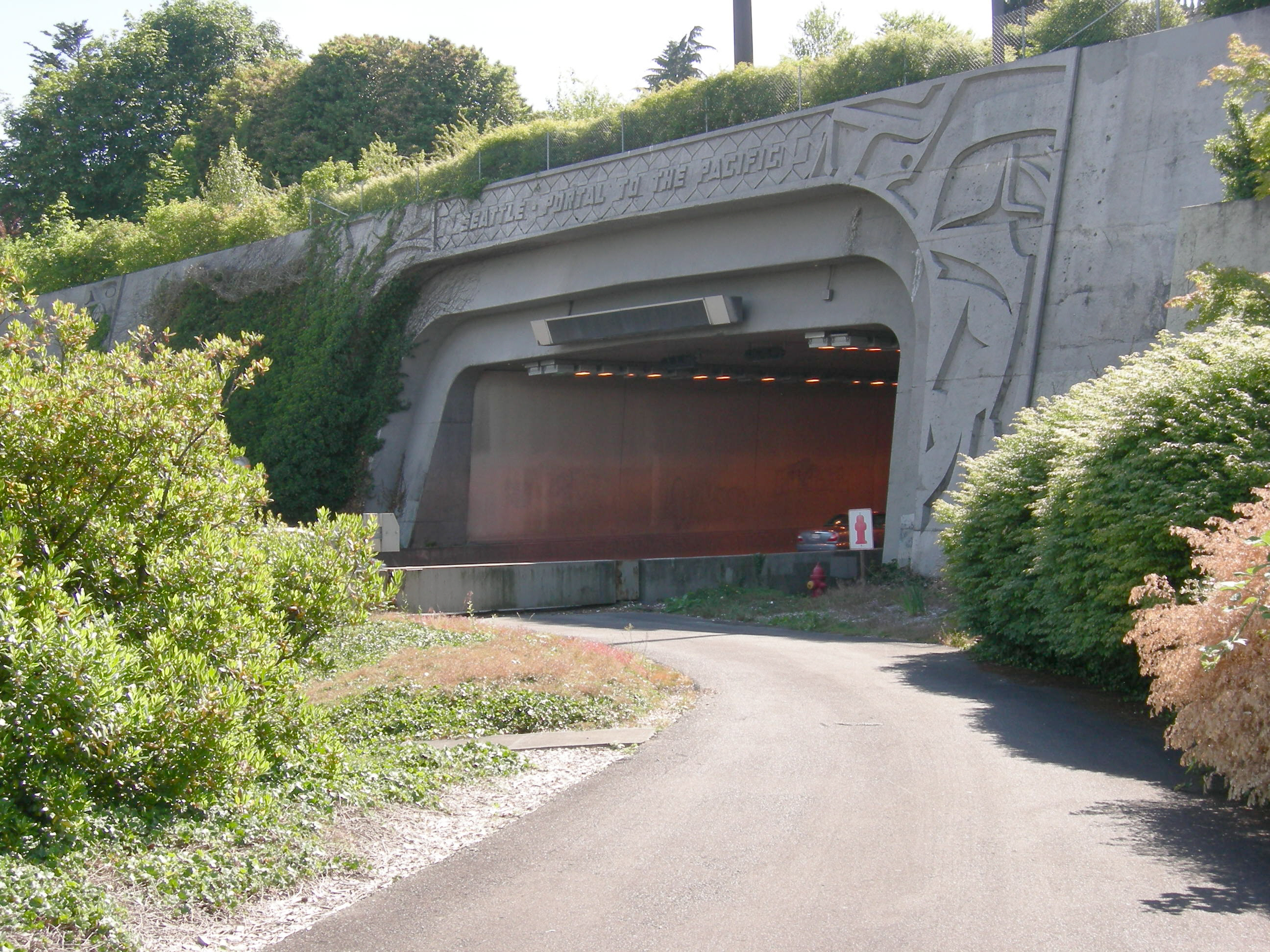
Eastern portal of 1989 tunnel

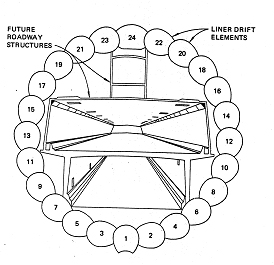
Cross section of 1989 tunnel. Top to bottom: pedestrian and bicycle trail, westbound motor vehicle traffic, buses and carpools (now converted to carry Link light rail, exclusively).

Upon completion of the Interstate 90 expansion program in the 1990s, the freeway capacity increased to three general-purpose lanes in each direction and two reversible HOV lanes. Eastbound traffic uses the original tunnels. Westbound traffic uses the upper deck of the northern new tunnel. A two-lane reversible roadway uses the lower deck. The reversible roadway served as express lanes for transit buses and carpools (2+ people) during peak commute periods until 2017. The express lanes flowed westbound on weekday mornings and eastbound on weekday afternoons and evenings. On weekends, the express lanes were open; traffic direction was variable depending on anticipated traffic volumes. When the express lanes were open to eastbound traffic, single-occupant vehicles headed to Mercer Island are allowed to use the lanes per an inter-local agreement signed in 1976.

Above the westbound traffic is the I-90 Trail tunnel. At 1,330 feet (410 m), it is the longest non-adapted trail tunnel in the world. On the western half, the trail emerges onto the lid and uses trails in Lid Park.

In 2017, the Washington State Department of Transportation added a pair of high-occupancy vehicle lanes (HOV lanes) to Interstate 90 from Seattle to Bellevue, replacing the reversible express lanes. The express lanes were closed in June 2017 for the construction of the East Link light rail project extending Link light rail service from Seattle to Bellevue and Redmond; the extension opened in March 2026. On Mercer Island, WSDOT and Sound Transit have built direct access ramps to allow buses and HOVs to exit and enter I-90 from the HOV lanes.

== See also ==
- List of tunnels documented by the Historic American Engineering Record in Washington (state)
