= East Channel Bridge =

Highway bridge between Mercer Island and Bellevue, Washington, United States

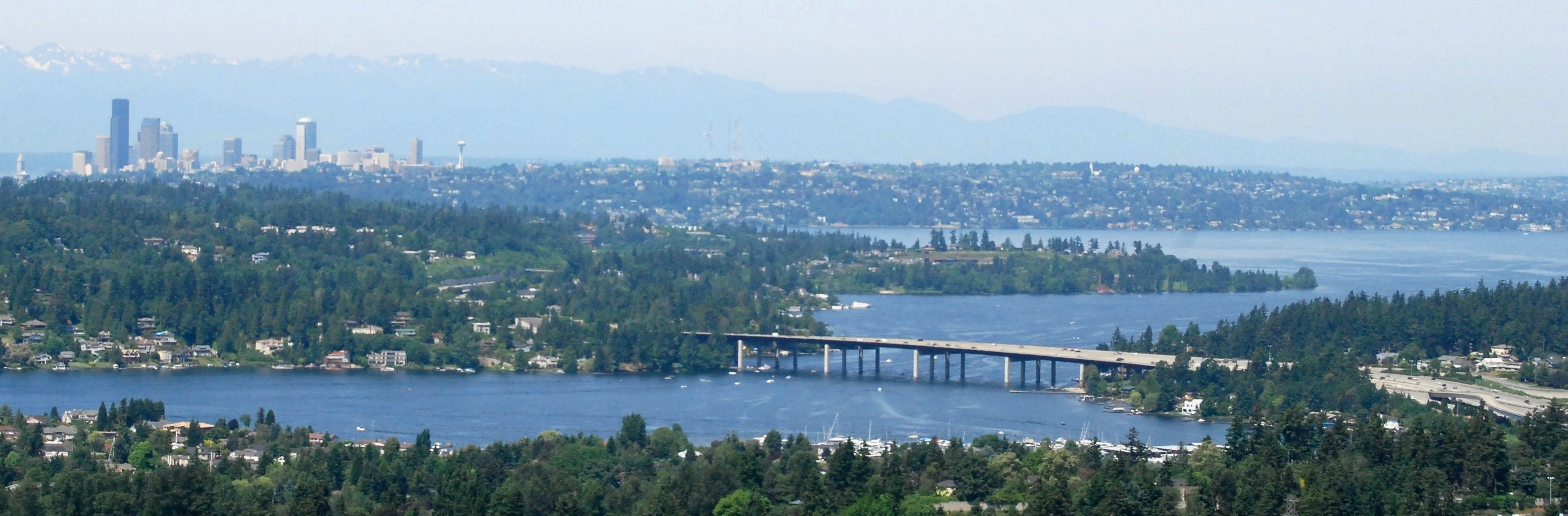
- East Channel Bridge
- Coordinates: 47°34′44″N 122°12′0″W
- Carries: I-90
- Crosses: East Channel of Lake Washington
- Locale: Mercer Island, WA

Characteristics
- Design: Box girder bridge
- Material: Steel

History
- Opened: Westbound span: 1981 Eastbound span: 1988

Location
- Interactive map of East Channel Bridge

The East Channel Bridge is a bridge carrying Interstate 90 from Mercer Island, Washington, to Bellevue, Washington, over the East Channel of Lake Washington, which separates Mercer Island from the rest of the Eastside.

The original bridge was opened November 10, 1923, and was the first bridge to reach the island. George Lightfoot, known as the father of the other bridge on Mercer Island, the Lacey V. Murrow Memorial Bridge, had the charge of opening the bridge for boats. In 1940, it was demolished and replaced. Currently, two parallel bridges carry I-90 traffic at this location. A steel box girder bridge, built in 1981, carries westbound I-90 traffic and the Mountains to Sound Greenway Trail, also known as the I-90 Trail. Another steel box girder bridge, built in 1988, carries eastbound I-90 traffic and the 2 Line of Sound Transit's Link light rail system.

== See also ==
- Lacey V. Murrow Memorial Bridge and Homer M. Hadley Memorial Bridge, which carry I-90 over Lake Washington to Seattle.
