= Lakeview School =

Lakeview School may refer to:

- Lakeview School (Birmingham, Alabama), listed on the National Register of Historic Places in Birmingham, Alabama
- Lakeview School (Mercer Island, Washington), listed on the National Register of Historic Places in King County, Washington
