= East Channel =

East Channel is the name of more than one body of water, such as:

- East Channel (East River) in New York, N.Y.
- East Channel of Lake Washington, state of Washington, bridged by the East Channel Bridge
