= NYHS =

NYHS may refer to:

- New-York Historical Society, an American history museum and library
- New York Harbor School, a public high school in New York City
- Northwest Yeshiva High School, a Jewish high school in Mercer Island, Washington
