= Luther Burbank Park =

Park in King County, Washington, United States

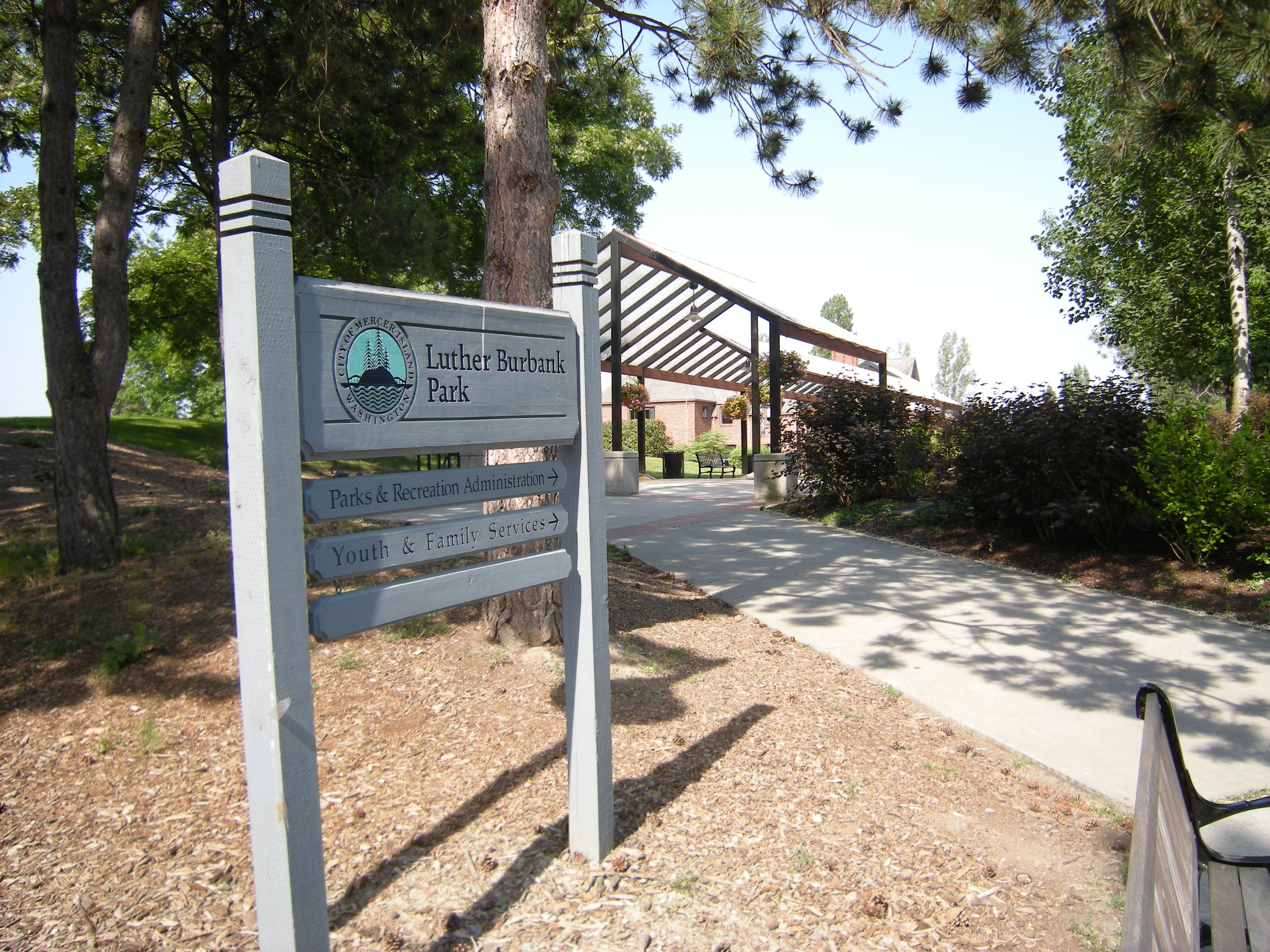
- Interactive map of Luther Burbank Park
- Type: Urban park
- Location: Mercer Island, Washington
- Coordinates: 47.59149°N 122.22512°W
- Created: 1969
- Operator: city of Mercer Island

Luther Burbank Park

Luther Burbank Park is a park in the city of Mercer Island, located in King County, in Washington State. Luther Burbank Park is located at an elevation of 15 metres (49 ft) above sea level.

== Description ==
The terrain surrounding Luther Burbank Park is flat in the northwest, but hilly in the southeast. (Note: Calculated from the interpolation of all elevation data (DEM 3") from Viewfinder Panoramas, within a 10 kilometres (6.2 mi) radius. The full algorithm is available here.) The highest point in the area is First Hill, 98 metres (322 ft) above sea level, 1.5 kilometres (0.93 mi) southwest of Luther Burbank Park. (Note: The highest point above the local horizon, according to elevation data from GeoNames.) There are about 1,463 people per square kilometer around Luther Burbank Park is very densely populated. The nearest larger city is Seattle, 8.2 kilometres (5.1 mi) km west of Luther Burbank Park. forest deciduous covers almost the entire area around Luther Burbank Park. In the region around Luther Burbank Park, bays, estuaries, bays, and straits are unusually common. (Note: More than 20 kilometres (12 mi) away compared to the average density of the Earth, according to GeoNames.)

The climate is Mediterranean. The average temperature is 9 °C (48 °F). The warmest month is August, at 21 °C, and the coldest is January, at 0 °C. The average rainfall is 1,417 millimetres (55.8 in) per year. The wettest month is March, at 192 millimeters of rain, and the driest is July, at 26 millimetres (1.0 in).

The city makes the park available for rental. The park features more than 3 miles (4.8 km) of walking trails.
