= Phil Hardberger Park =

Public city park of San Antonio, Texas

- Interactive map of Phil Hardberger Park
- Type: Public park
- Location: 13203 Blanco Road; San Antonio, Texas 78216
- Coordinates: 29.557°N 98.526°W
- Area: 311 acres (1.26 km^{2})
- Created: May 2010
- Operator: City of San Antonio
- Open: 2010

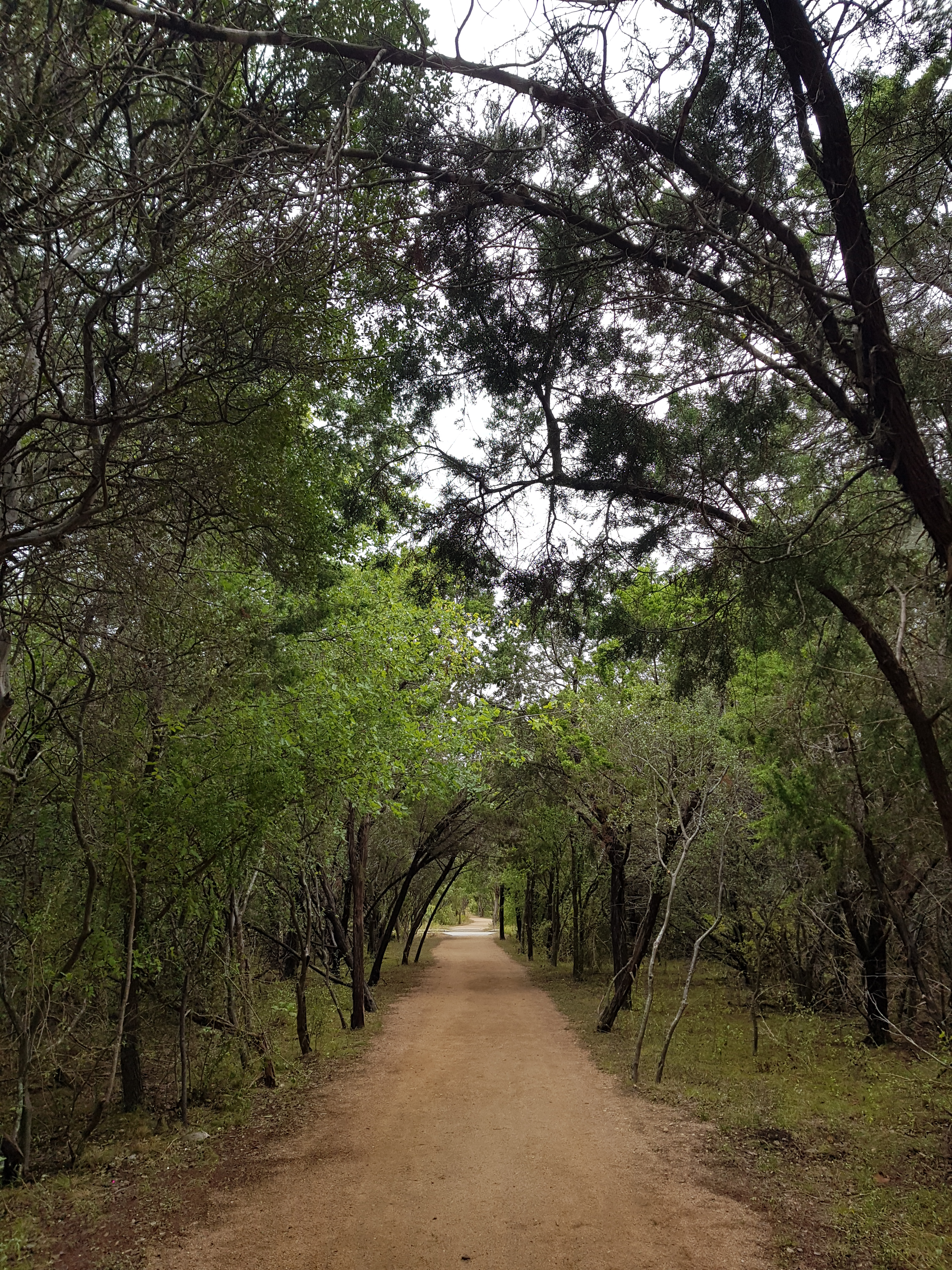

Phil Hardberger Park is a public city park of San Antonio, Texas which opened in May 2010.

== History ==
Minnie and Max Voelcker owned and operated a dairy farm on the property. The property included a stone house, which was preserved. The property was purchased by the city in 2007 and is considered the signature project among the 69 park projects included in the 2007–2012 Bond Program. Phil Hardberger championed this bond program as San Antonio mayor from 2005 to 2009. The San Antonio City Council voted December 3, 2009, to name the park in honor of Hardberger's contributions to the project.

== Recreation and features ==
Features include 7.5 miles (12.1 km) of trails, two playscapes on either side of the park, a nature play area for children, dog parks on both sides of the park, picnic facilities, basketball courts, an outdoor classroom, a children's vegetable garden, a wildscape demonstration garden, a restored wetland, the Salado Creek overlook, the Skywalk, and the Robert L.B Tobin Land Bridge. There are also three public art displays. A 13-acre (5.3 ha) restored prairie landscape has been created.

== See also ==
- Brackenridge Park
- Dwight D. Eisenhower Park (San Antonio) – city park with similar features
- San Antonio Japanese Tea Garden
- Travis Park
