= Freeway lid =

Deck bridge on top of a highway

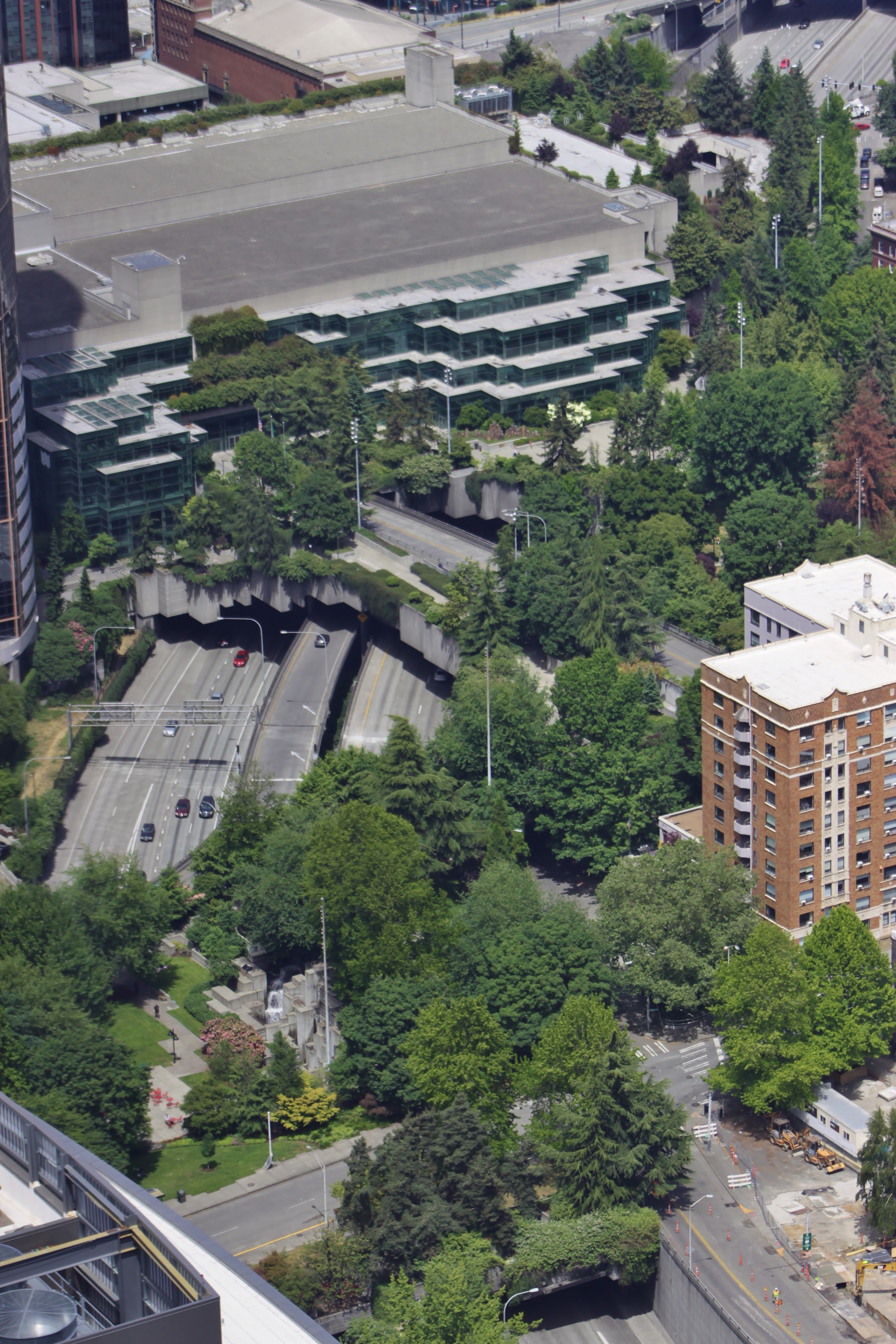
Washington State Convention Center and Freeway Park form lids over Interstate 5 in Seattle, Washington, United States.

A freeway lid (also known as a freeway cap, highway cap or highway deck) is a deck bridge built on top of a controlled-access highway or other roadway. It is commonly used to create new parkland in urban areas, but can also support buildings or other heavy structures such as convention centers. In some locations, the terms stitch or cap-and-stitch are used to describe overpasses containing widened bridges that accommodate wider sidewalks or small amenity space beside the roadway above the highway.

Cities and highway departments who propose building freeway lids over highways often cite potential benefits including reconnecting street grids near highways, or providing increased access to neighborhoods harmed by displacement caused by past highway construction. Freeway lids are often criticized by highway expansion opponents, who accuse highway departments of using freeway lids to "greenwash" their lane expansion projects to be more palatable to the public.

== Goals ==
In the United States, common goals of freeway lids are to reclaim urban street space, and to reconnect neighborhoods bisected by freeway construction.

In several cases, lids are proposed in conjunction with freeway expansion projects, leading to accusations that the lid is used to make the expansion palatable to a public that might otherwise oppose it. A plan by Oregon Department of Transportation to widen and cap Interstate 5 through the Albina neighborhood of Portland was supported by some local community groups, but also engendered lawsuits from groups opposed to the expansion.

== Examples ==
- Aubrey Davis Park, Mercer Island, Washington, US
- Evergreen Point, Hunts Point, and Yarrow Point on Washington State Route 520, Bellevue, Washington, US
- Tunnel Tops Park and Battery Bridge Park, San Francisco, California, US
- George Washington Bridge Bus Station and the Bridge Apartments, New York City, US
- Kansas City Convention Center, Kansas City, Missouri, US
- Klyde Warren Park and Southern Gateway Park, Dallas, Texas, US
- Teralta Park, San Diego, California, US
- Seattle Convention Center and Jim Ellis Freeway Park, Seattle, Washington, US
- Capitol Crossing, Washington, DC, US
- High Street crossing, Columbus, Ohio, US
- Meguro Sky Garden, Tokyo, Japan
- Frankie Pace Park, Pittsburgh, Pennsylvania, US
- Big Dig associated parks (Rose Fitzgerald Kennedy Greenway) and Prudential Center, Boston, Massachusetts, US
- Kanawha Plaza, Richmond, Virginia, US
- Central 70 Cover Park, Denver, Colorado, US
- Robert L.B. Tobin Land Bridge, San Antonio, TX, US
- Kinder Land Bridge, Houston, TX
- Margaret T. Hance Park, Phoenix, Arizona, US
- Memorial Park, La Cañada Flintridge, CA, US
- Folk Art Park, Fifth Street Plaza, and Hartfield-Jackson Airport, Atlanta, Georgia, US
- Freeway, Rothstein, and Victoria Parks, Southfield, Michigan, US
- Foglietta Plaza and Veterans Memorial Park, Philadelphia, Pennsylvania, US
- Target Field, Minneapolis, Minnesota, US
- Fall River City Hall, Fall River, Massachusetts, US

== Proposed Projects ==
Name	Location	Description
Reconnect Rondo	Saint Paul, Minnesota	A plan to cap a section of I-94 through the Rondo Neighborhood

== See also ==
- Bridge restaurant
