= List of tunnels documented by the Historic American Engineering Record in Washington =

This is a list of tunnels documented by the Historic American Engineering Record in the US state of Washington.

== Tunnels ==
Survey No.	Name (as assigned by HAER)	Built	Documented	Carries	Crosses	Location	County	Coordinates
WA-70	Box Canyon Tunnel	1952	1992	Stevens Canyon Highway	Stevens Ridge	Packwood	Lewis	46°45′55″N 121°38′12″W
WA-74	Stevens Canyon Tunnel	1936	1992	Stevens Canyon Highway	Mountain spur	Longmire	Pierce	46°45′48″N 121°39′49″W
WA-75	East Side Highway Tunnel	1939	1992	SR 123 (East Side Highway)	Mountain spur	Packwood	Lewis	46°50′46″N 121°31′40″W
WA-109	Mount Baker Ridge Tunnel	1940	1993	I-90	Mount Baker Ridge	Seattle	King	47°35′25″N 122°17′55″W
WA-184	Alaskan Way Viaduct and Battery Street Tunnel	1966	2008	SR 99	Battery Street	Seattle	King	47°36′50″N 122°20′52″W

== See also ==
- List of bridges documented by the Historic American Engineering Record in Washington (state)
