= Lakeview School (Mercer Island, Washington) =

- U.S. National Register of Historic Places
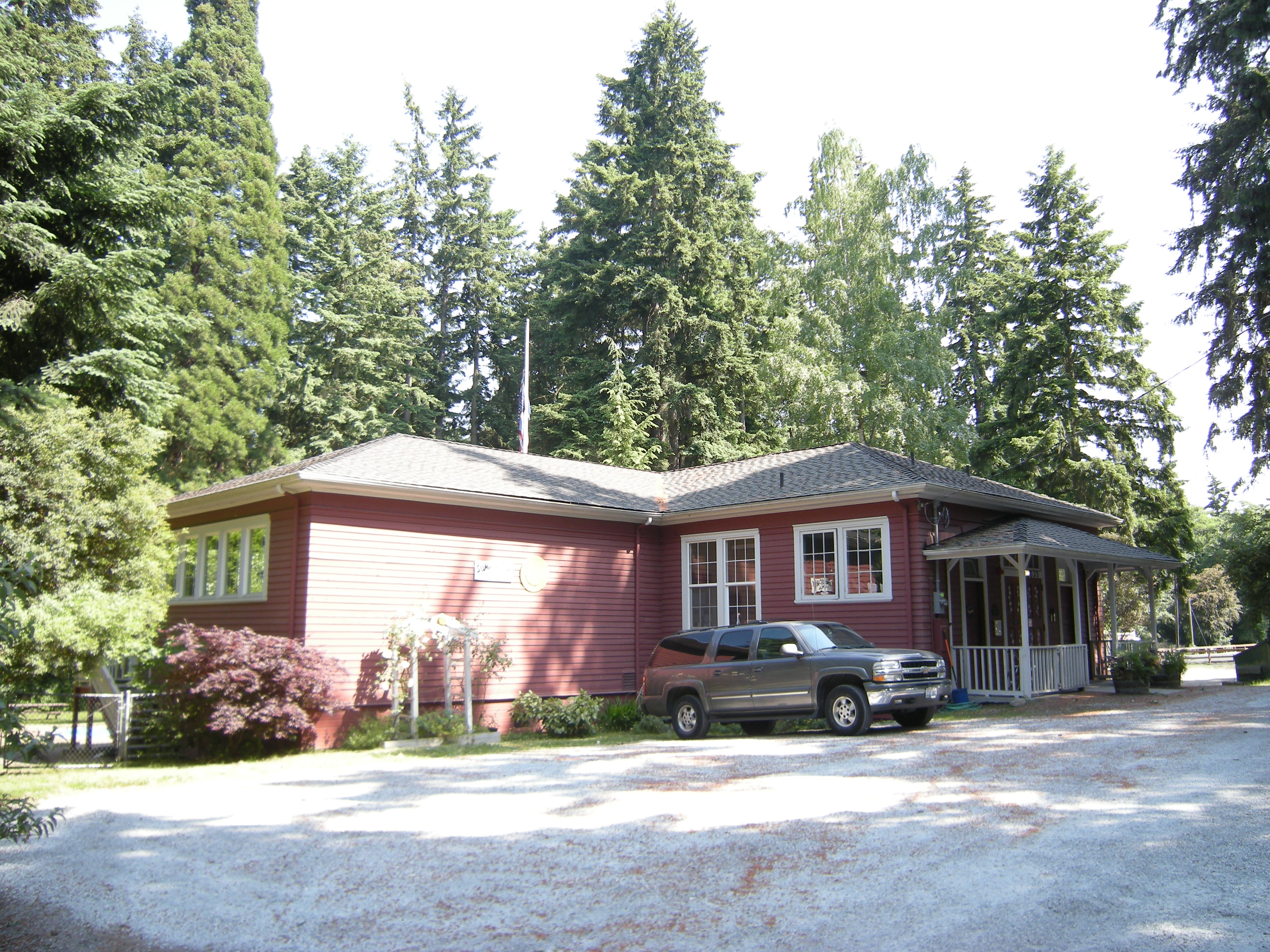
- The west facade and rear wing of the school

- Location within Washington (state)
- Location: Island Crest Way and S.E. Sixty-eighth St., Mercer Island, Washington
- Coordinates: 47°32′30.4″N 122°13′20.3″W
- Area: 0.3 acres (0.12 ha)
- Built: 1918
- Architectural style: Late 19th And 20th Century Revivals
- MPS: Rural Public Schools of Washington State MPS
- NRHP reference No.: 88000742
- Added to NRHP: June 16, 1988

Lakeview School is located at 8635 SE 68th St. on Mercer Island in Seattle, USA. It was built in 1918. At its inception, the school was built to house eight grades of Mercer Island students. The school was co-founded by Eleanor Wolf and Marienne "Nuki" Vinal Fellows who are credited with starting the Mercer Island Nursery School Association, a non-profit organization, in 1957.

Fellows ran Sunnybeam School, the nursery school located within Lakeview, for thirty years. She retired in 1984 and was an honorary board member until her death in 2009.

The school was purchased by the South Mercer Community Club in 1945 and in 1972 was renamed as Sunnybeam School. It continues to operate as Sunnybeam today.

Lakeview School was added to the National Register of Historic Places in 1988. The listing includes the two-room frame schoolhouse with pedimented portico and rear wing; and the teacher's cottage on the northwest corner of the property.
