= Aubrey Davis Park =

Park in Mercer Island, Washington

- Mercer Island Lid, First Hill Lid
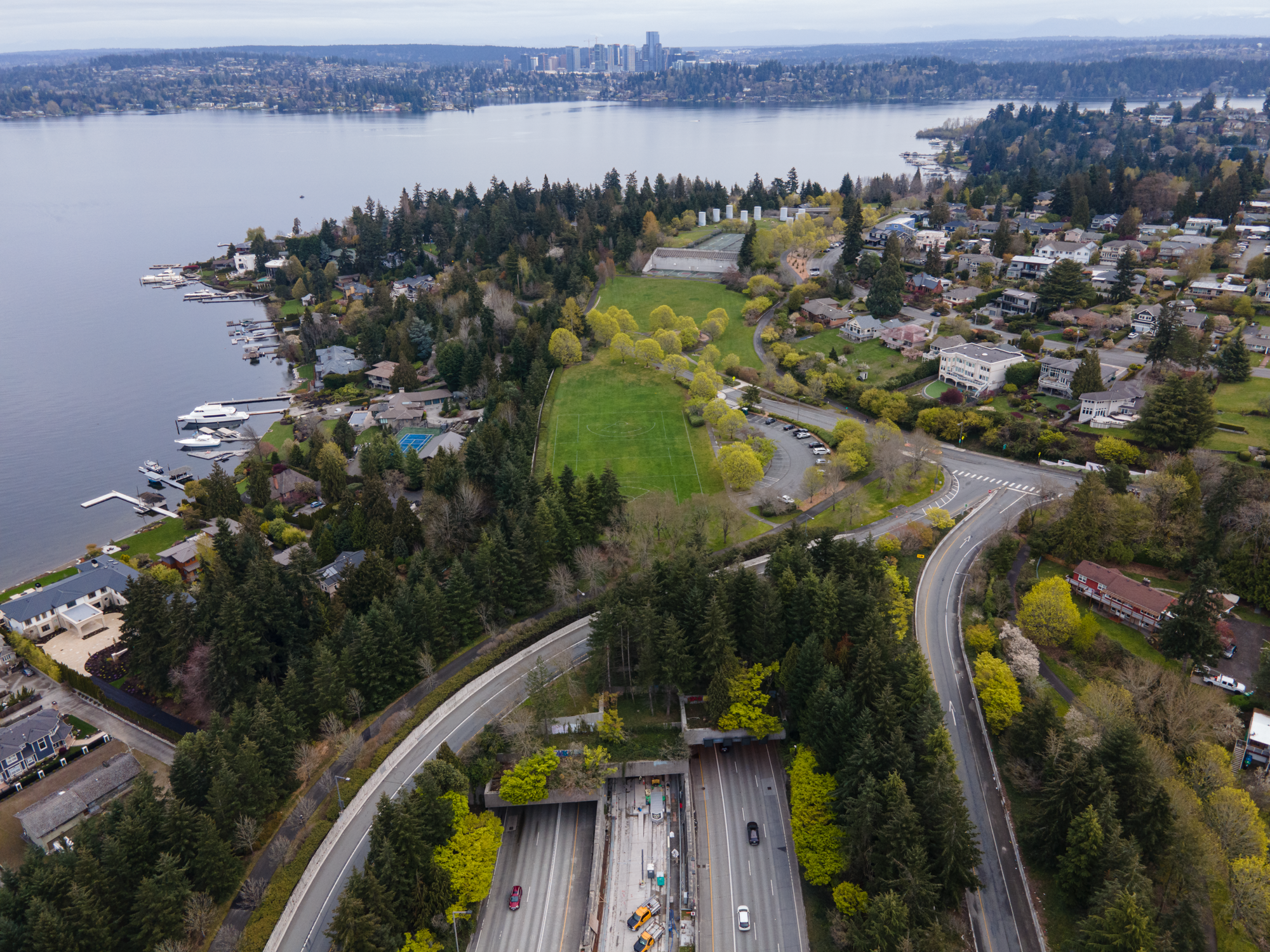
- Aerial view of Aubrey Davis Park
- Interactive map of Aubrey Davis Park
- Type: Park lid
- Motto: City of Mercer Island
- Location: Mercer Island, Washington
- Coordinates: 47.591795°N 122.244465°W
- Status: Open all year

Aubrey Davis Park, formerly the Mercer Island Lid and First Hill Lid, is a park lid covering 2,800 feet (850 m) of Interstate 90 (I-90) between West Mercer Way and 76th Avenue Southeast on Mercer Island, Washington, United States. The park was created to minimize the impact of I-90, opening to the public in the 1990s. Former Mercer Island mayor Aubrey Davis lobbied for the park's creation in the 1970s. After his death in 2013, the park was renamed after him.

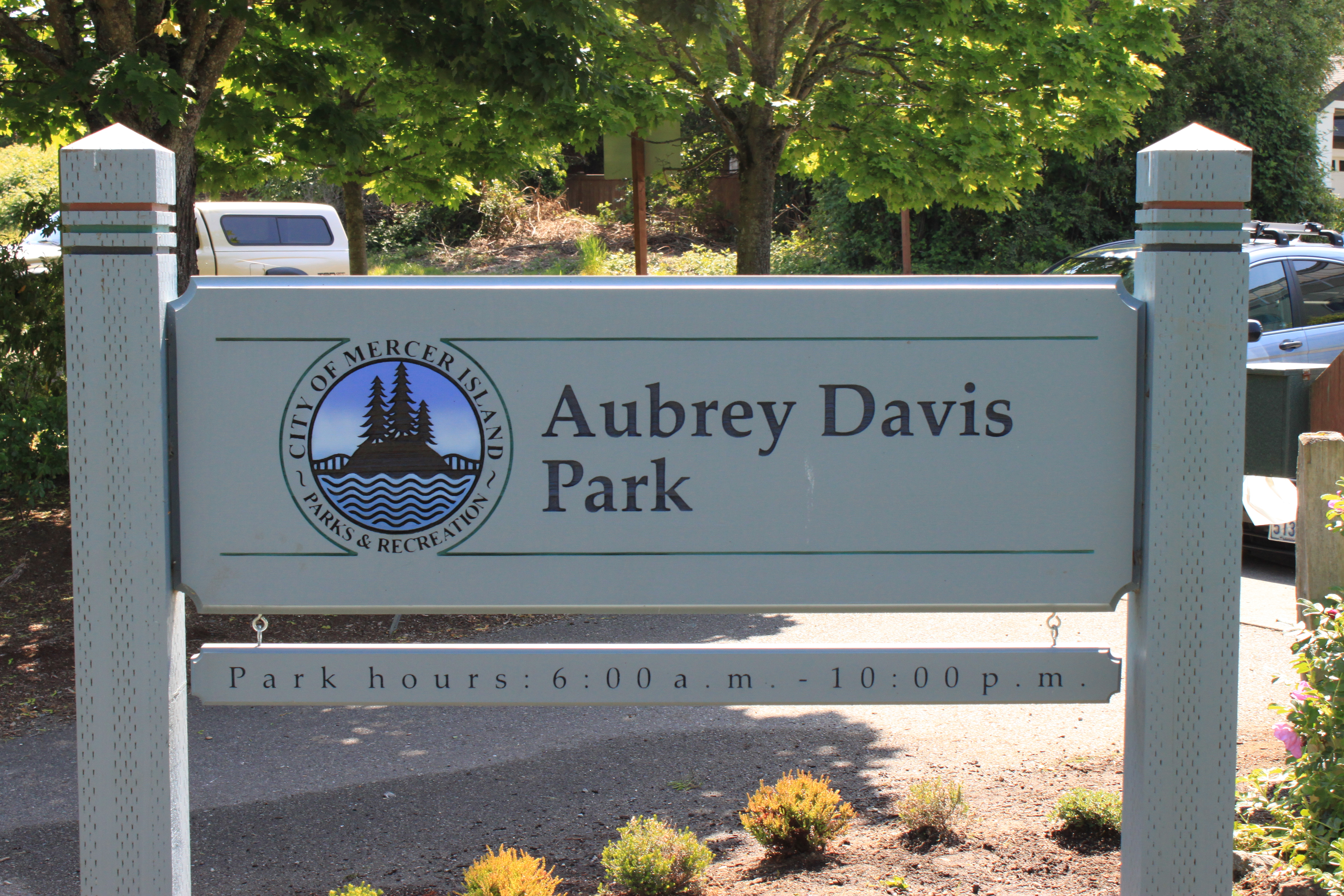
Aubrey Davis Park sign

== See also ==
- List of structures built on top of freeways
