= Robert L.B. Tobin Land Bridge =

Wildlife crossing in San Antonio

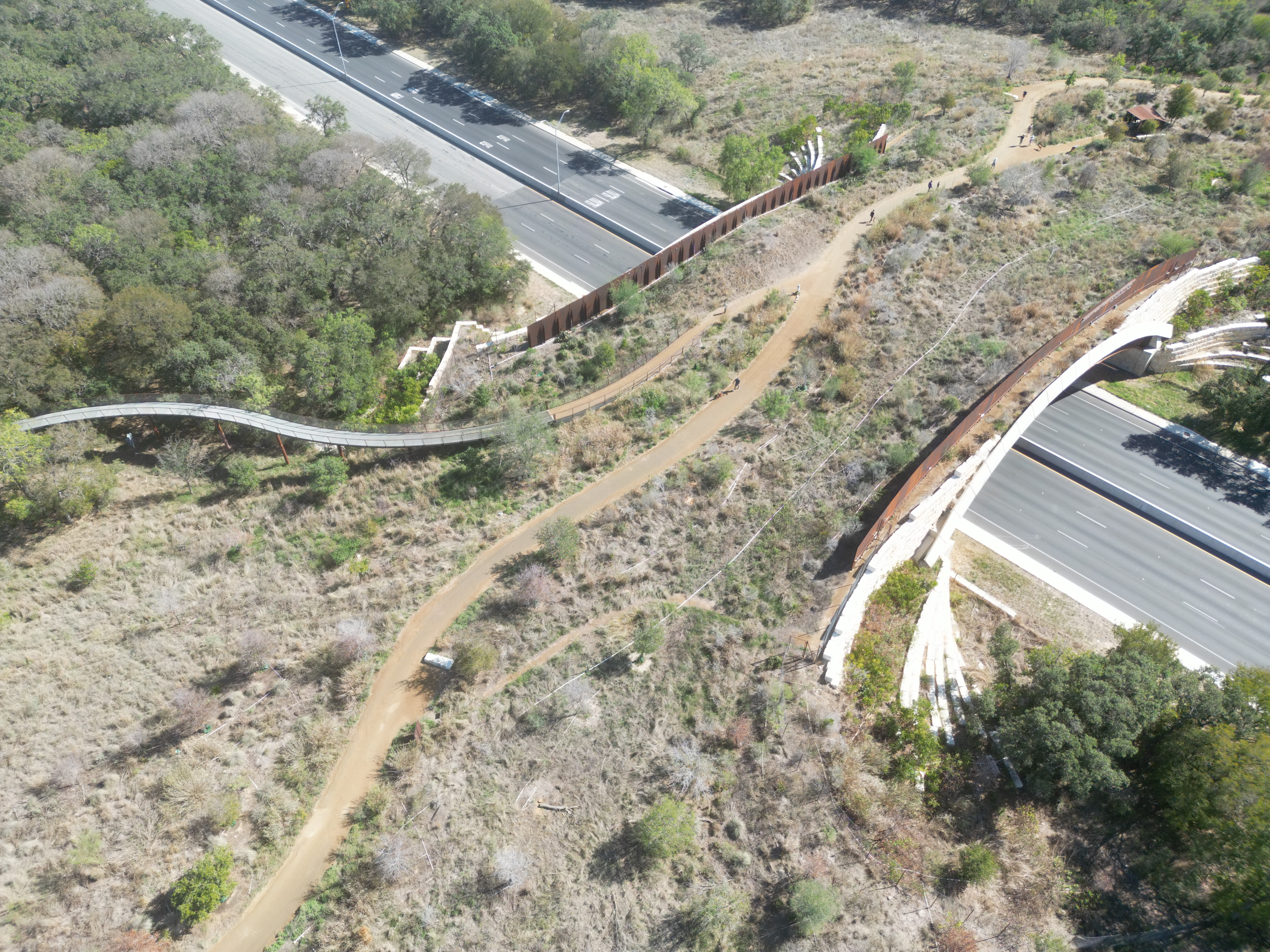
- Coordinates: 29°33′31.5″N 98°31′29.8″W
- Crosses: Wurzbach Parkway
- Locale: 29.5587019,-98.5246082
- Named for: Robert L.B. Tobin
- Website: philhardbergerpark.org/land-bridge

Characteristics
- Material: Arched steel girders, concrete
- Total length: 189 feet (58 m)
- Width: 150 feet (46 m)
- Height: 25 feet (7.6 m)

History
- Architect: Lead: Rialto Studio; Landscape: Stimson Studio
- Engineering design by: Arup
- Constructed by: SpawGlass
- Construction start: November 26, 2018
- Construction end: December 12, 2020
- Construction cost: $23 million - $13 million from a Voter-approved City Bond, $10 million in private donations and grants.
- Opened: December 12, 2020

Location
- Interactive map of Robert L.B. Tobin Land Bridge

The Robert L.B. Tobin Land Bridge is a wildlife crossing over Wurzbach Parkway in San Antonio's Phil Hardberger Park that opened in December 2020. The project cost $23 million and is designed for both wildlife and pedestrians.

== History ==
Construction of the land bridge began on November 26, 2018, and was completed on December 12, 2020.

On April 5, 2021, a footbridge called the Skywalk opened, which rises 18 feet (5 m) above the park, winds through the tree canopy, and connects to the land bridge at the end of its 1,000-foot (300 m) span.

== Design ==
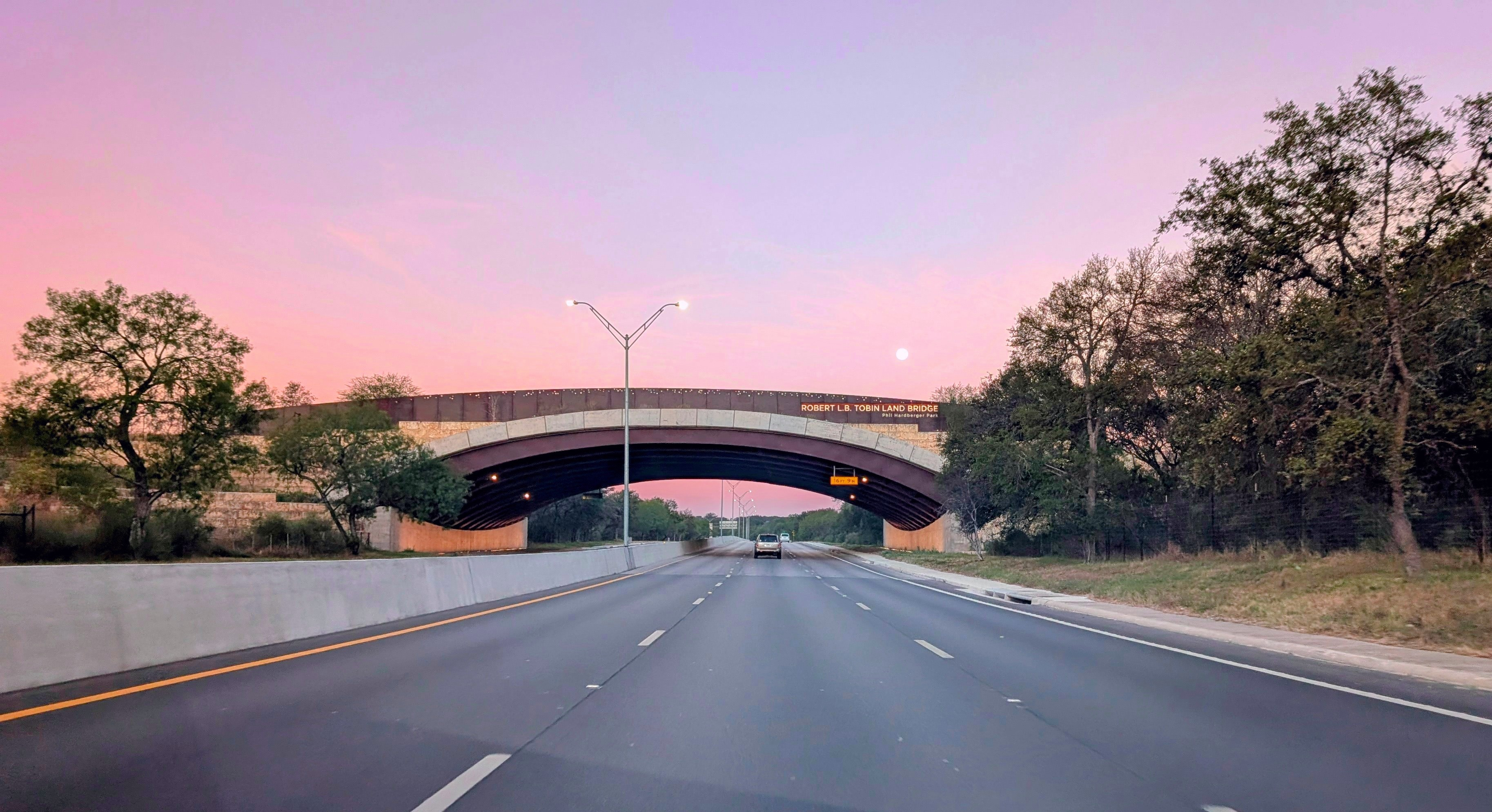
The bridge viewed from Wurzbach Parkway

At 189 feet (58 m) long and 150 feet (46 m) wide, it is the first mixed-use wildlife bridge in the United States and influenced the design of the Annenberg Wildlife Crossing in Agoura Hills, California in 2025. With 8-foot (2.4 m) tall noise damping corten steel walls on both sides, the land bridge is designed to appear to crossers as a small hill, continuing the landscape of the park. An ADA compliant walking path 8–10 feet (2.4–3.0 m) wide provides pedestrian access across the bridge and also connects to the 6-foot (1.8 m) wide Skywalk. The bridge has a 250,000-US-gallon (950,000 L) underground cistern that collects stormwater run off from the park, the land bridge, and the nearby development. The reclaimed water is used in the water bubblers at the wildlife blinds.

== Animals using the bridge ==
Before the first anniversary of the Robert L.B. Tobin Land Bridge, all mammal species known to reside in the park were photographed on the land bridge, wildlife traffic is not expected to substantially increase until the foliage planted on the bridge grows thicker.

As part of a five-year study, the Parks and Recreation Department documented wildlife using the bridge. To date, species include the Virginia opossum, cottontail rabbit, white-tailed deer, coyote, rock squirrel, fox squirrel, rat, raccoon, armadillo, bobcat, gray fox, and striped skunk.

== See also ==
- Wildlife crossing § Examples
