= Mercer Island, Washington =

City in Washington, United States

- City
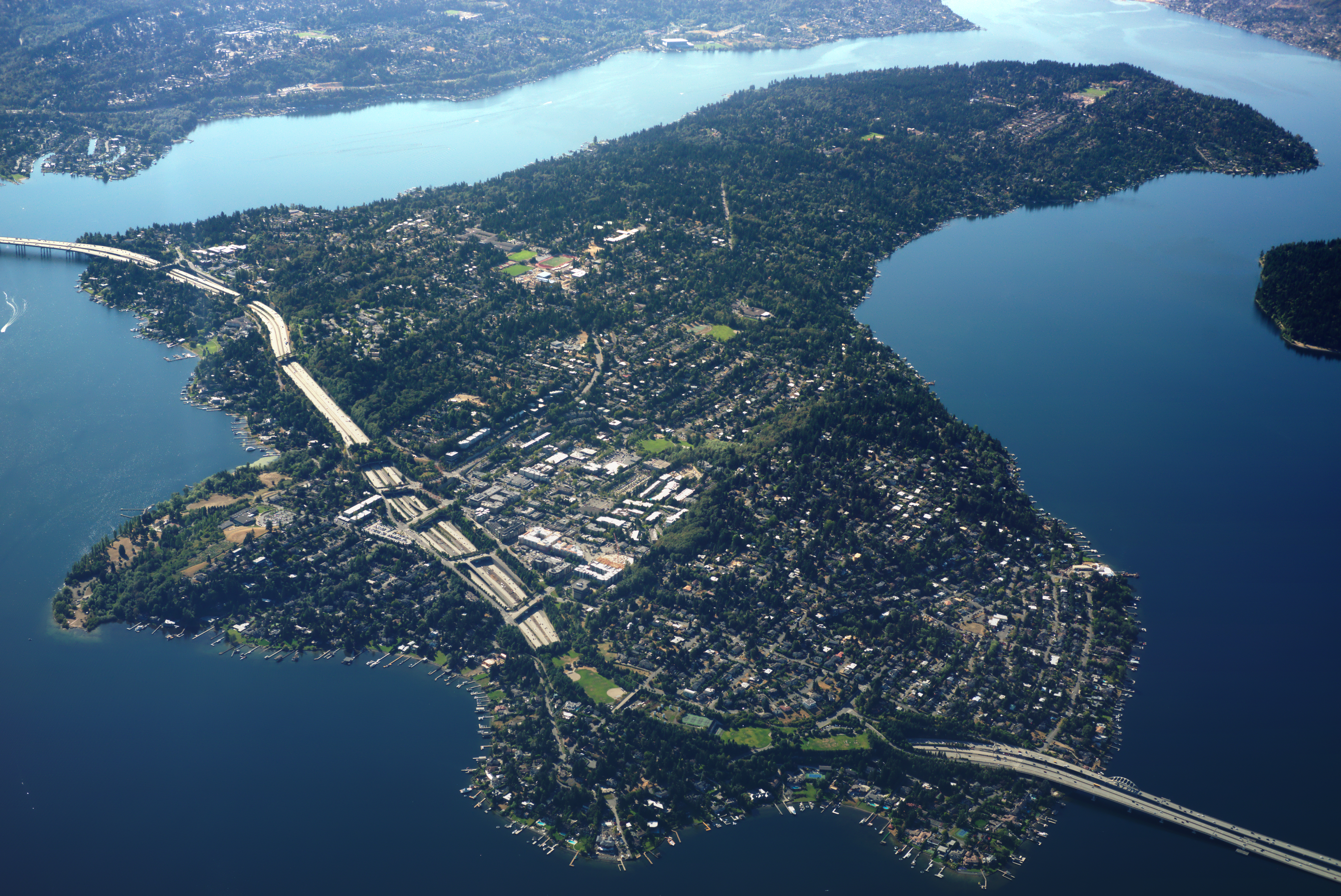
- Aerial view of Mercer Island from the north

- Seal
- Interactive map of Mercer Island, Washington
- Coordinates: 47°34′24″N 122°14′19″W
- Country: United States
- State: Washington
- County: King
- Incorporated: July 5, 1960

Government
  - Type: Council–manager
  - Mayor: Dave Rosenbaum
  - City manager: Jessi Bon

Area
  - Total: 12.90 sq mi (33.41 km^{2})
  - Land: 6.38 sq mi (16.53 km^{2})
  - Water: 6.52 sq mi (16.88 km^{2})
- Elevation: 75 ft (23 m)

Population (2020)
  - Total: 25,748
  - Estimate (2024): 25,302
  - Density: 3,880/sq mi (1,497/km^{2})
- Time zone: UTC−8 (Pacific (PST))
  - Summer (DST): UTC−7 (PDT)
- ZIP Code: 98040
- Area code(s): 206, 564
- FIPS code: 53-45005
- GNIS feature ID: 2411082
- Website: mercerisland.gov

Mercer Island is a city in King County, Washington, United States, located on an island of the same name in the southern portion of Lake Washington. Mercer Island is in the Seattle metropolitan area, connected to the mainland on both sides by bridges carrying Interstate 90 and Link light rail, with the city of Seattle to the west and the city of Bellevue to the east. The population was 25,748 at the 2020 census.

The island was formed 17,000 years before present by the Vashon Glaciation event during the Last Glacial Period and was originally inhabited by the indigenous Snoqualmie people. It was named for a member of the Mercer family, a prominent Seattle pioneer family, and was a recreational and hunting site for early European American settlers in the area. The first permanent European American settlers arrived in 1885 and were followed by the establishment of East Seattle on the northwest side of Mercer Island in 1887. East Seattle later developed into a resort town with regular steamboat ferries from Seattle and the Eastside. The first East Channel Bridge was completed in 1923, providing Mercer Island with a road connection to the mainland, and was followed by the Lake Washington Floating Bridge to Seattle in 1940.

Following the opening of the floating bridge, Mercer Island became a bedroom community for Seattle workers and gradually grew in population. A city covering the residential areas of the island was incorporated in July 1960 and followed a month later by an incorporated town in the northern business district; the two were merged into a single city in May 1970. A second floating bridge, now named the Homer M. Hadley Memorial Bridge, opened in 1989 as part of the construction of Interstate 90 across the island. The project included the construction of several freeway lids that were landscaped into parks.

== History ==
The western side of the island was home to two Snoqualmie settlements prior to the 19th-century arrival of European American settlers in the Puget Sound region. Mercer Island was named in 1854 for a member of the Mercer family, a prominent pioneer family who moved from Virginia to Seattle and often rowed to the island to pick berries, hunt, and fish. Disputed accounts attribute the namesake as Thomas Mercer or his brother Asa Mercer. The first non-indigenous people to permanently settle on the island, Charles and Agnes Olds, arrived in 1885 and were followed by 15 other families within five years. The first large community, East Seattle, was toward the northwest side of the island—near the McGilvara neighborhood. Charles C. Calkins created the settlement in 1887 and later built a large and gilded resort, the Calkins Hotel. The hotel was reached via a steamboat ferry between Madison Park, Leschi Park, and the Eastside. Guests included President Benjamin Harrison, of 1901, among other well-to-do dignitaries from Seattle to the East Coast of the United States. Burned by a mysterious fire, the hotel was razed during 1908.

The Calkins Landing continued service and presumably aided the establishment of a more permanent population. A denser urban community with business district developed toward the central northern island between the McGilvra neighborhood and Luther Burbank Park. This community now composes the majority of the island's crest through the Middle Island neighborhood.

In 1923, the wooden East Channel Bridge was built to connect the island with Bellevue; it was later replaced by a new concrete span in the 1930s. In 1930, George W. Lightfoot requested a bridge between Mercer Island and Seattle. The Lacey V. Murrow Memorial Bridge, currently the second longest floating bridge in the world, was built and opened in 1940. In 1989, a second bridge, the Homer M. Hadley Memorial Bridge, was built parallel to the Lacey V. Murrow Memorial Bridge. The third East Channel Bridge, Lacey V. Murrow Memorial Bridge, and Homer M. Hadley Memorial Bridge were incorporated into the route of Interstate 90 from Seattle, across Mercer Island, and into Bellevue.

The opening of the first floating bridge made Mercer Island into a bedroom community for commuters, which accelerated after bridge tolls were removed in 1949. The island's population grew from 1,200 in 1940 to 4,500 in 1950, necessitating municipal services that the King County government could not provide. The City of Mercer Island was incorporated from East Seattle on July 5, 1960, and comprised all of the island with the exception of the 70-acre (280,000 m^{2}) business district. Just over one month later, August 9, the Town of Mercer Island was incorporated from that business district, creating an enclave. The two municipalities merged as the City of Mercer Island on May 19, 1970, after several failed attempts at annexing each other.

== Geography ==
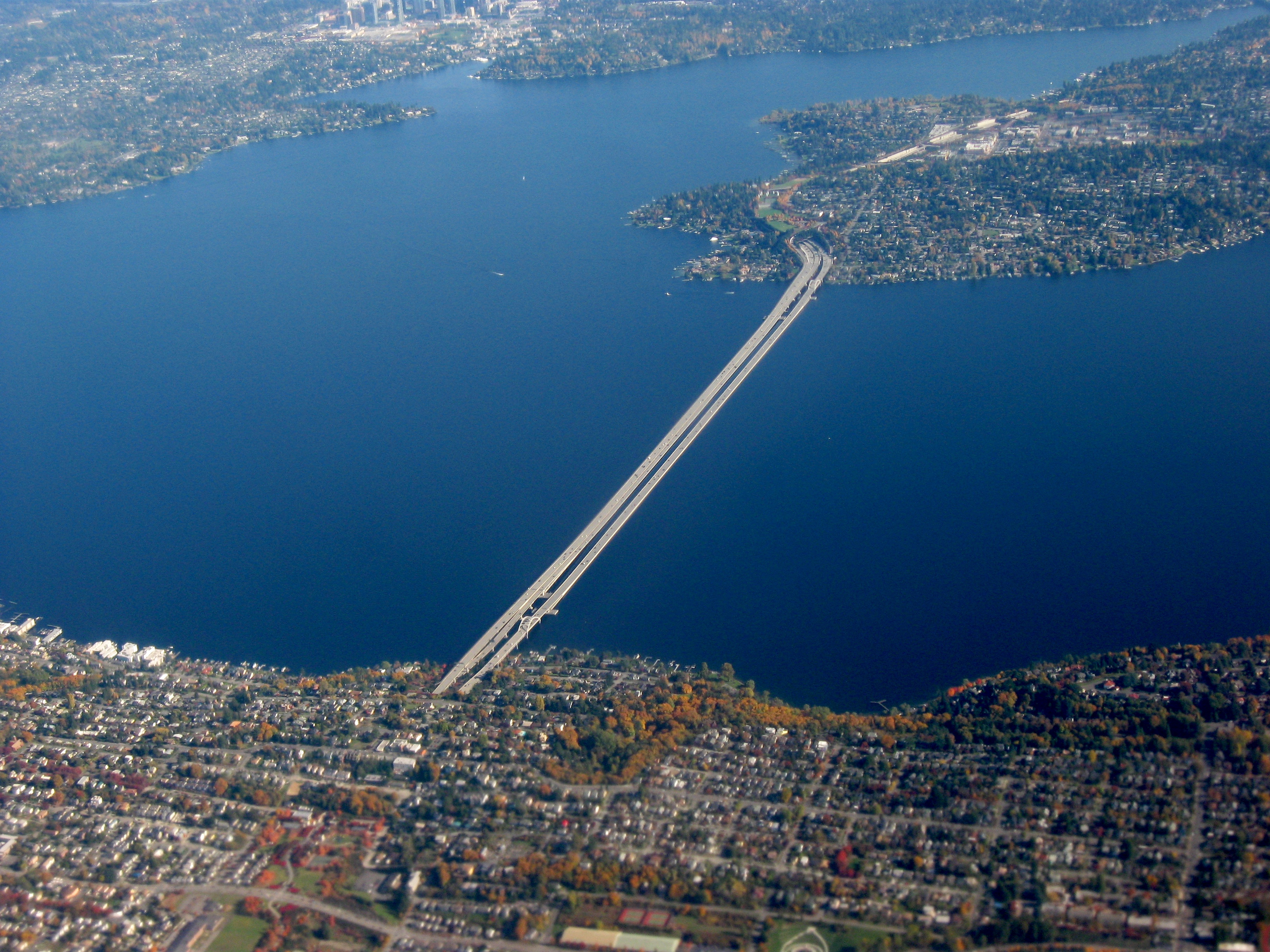
Aerial view of the Interstate 90 floating bridges connecting Seattle and the northern part of Mercer Island

Mercer Island lies in the southern half of Lake Washington between the cities of Seattle to the west, Bellevue to the east, and Renton to the south. The city limits are conterminous with the island, which is described as "shaped like a footprint without toes". According to the United States Census Bureau, the city has a total area of 12.90 square miles (33.41 km^{2}), of which 6.38 square miles (16.52 km^{2}) are land and 6.52 square miles (16.89 km^{2}) are water. Mercer Island is approximately six miles (9.7 km) long and up to four miles (6.4 km) wide.

The island was formed 17,000 years before present by the recession of the Vashon Glaciation, which left a plateau that runs north–south through the center along with a series of ravines. Mercer Island's elevation ranges from 18 feet (5.5 m) on the shore of Lake Washington to its highest point, near Rotary Park, at 394 feet (120 m) above mean sea level. The underlying soils include a mix of alluvial and terrace deposits from the glaciation, along with layers of till and sand that are up to 100 feet (30 m) thick. The Seattle Fault, an east–west geologic fault, runs across northern Mercer Island and leaves the city seismically vulnerable. Past seismic activity on the island caused landslides that carried old-growth trees into two sections of Lake Washington that are now known as sunken forests.

Mercer Island is the most populated island in a lake in the US.

=== Climate ===
This region experiences warm (but not hot) and dry summers, with no average monthly temperatures above 71.6 °F (22.0 °C). According to the Köppen Climate Classification system, Mercer Island has a warm-summer Mediterranean climate, abbreviated "Csb" on climate maps.

== Demographics ==
Historical population
| Census | Pop. | Note | %± |
|---|---|---|---|
| 1970 | 19,047 | | — |
| 1980 | 21,522 | | 13.0% |
| 1990 | 20,816 | | −3.3% |
| 2000 | 22,036 | | 5.9% |
| 2010 | 22,699 | | 3.0% |
| 2020 | 25,748 | | 13.4% |
| 2024 (est.) | 25,302 | | −1.7% |
Source: United States Census Bureau

Mercer Island has an estimated 2024 population of 25,302 residents. According to data from the United States Census Bureau, the city has the 87th wealthiest ZIP Code in the United States when ranked on concentration of wealth. The median household income was $219,069 in 2024. An estimated 25 percent of the city's households identified as Jewish in 2014, comprising 7 percent of the Jewish population in the Seattle metropolitan area. The Stroum Jewish Community Center was established in 1969 alongside the first of two synagogues on the island.

=== 2020 census ===
As of the 2020 census, there were 25,748 people, 9,927 households, and 7,105 families residing in the city. The population density was 4,033.8 inhabitants per square mile (1,557.5/km^{2}). The median age was 44.5 years, with 23.4% of residents under the age of 18 and 20.3% of residents 65 years of age or older. For every 100 females there were 94.6 males, and for every 100 females age 18 and over there were 91.2 males age 18 and over.

There were 9,927 households, of which 34.0% had children under the age of 18 living in them. Of all households, 61.8% were married-couple households, 12.5% were households with a male householder and no spouse or partner present, and 21.5% were households with a female householder and no spouse or partner present. About 23.3% of all households were made up of individuals and 12.1% had someone living alone who was 65 years of age or older.

Of the 10,570 housing units, 6.1% were vacant. The homeowner vacancy rate was 1.2% and the rental vacancy rate was 6.4%.

100.0% of residents lived in urban areas, while 0.0% lived in rural areas.

Racial composition as of the 2020 census
| Race | Number | Percent |
|---|---|---|
| White | 16,642 | 64.6% |
| Black or African American | 287 | 1.1% |
| American Indian and Alaska Native | 59 | 0.2% |
| Asian | 5,924 | 23.0% |
| Native Hawaiian and Other Pacific Islander | 34 | 0.1% |
| Some other race | 329 | 1.3% |
| Two or more races | 2,473 | 9.6% |
| Hispanic or Latino (of any race) | 1,175 | 4.6% |

=== 2010 census ===
As of the 2010 census, there were 22,699 people, 9,109 households, and 6,532 families residing in the city. The population density was 3,591.2 inhabitants per square mile (1,386.6/km^{2}). There were 9,930 housing units at an average density of 1,571.2 per square mile (606.6/km^{2}).

According to the 2010 United States census, Mercer Island's racial and ethnic composition is as follows:

- White: 77.9% (non-Hispanic Whites: 75.1%)
- Asian: 15.9% (7.3% Chinese, 2.6% Korean, 2.3% Japanese, 1.7% Indian, 0.5% Filipino, 0.5% Vietnamese, 1.0% other Asian)
- Black or African American: 1.3%
- Hispanic or Latino (of any race): 2.8% (1.3% Mexican, 0.1% Puerto Rican, 0.1% Cuban, 1.3% other Hispanic or Latino)
- American Indian and Alaska Native: 0.2%
- Native Hawaiian and other Pacific Islander: 0.1%
- Other race: 0.7%
- Two or more races: 3.9% (2.4% White and Asian, 0.3% White and African American, 0.3% White and Native American, 0.2% White and other race)

There were 9,109 households, of which 33.5% had children under the age of 18 living with them, 62.3% were married couples living together, 6.5% had a female householder with no husband present, 2.9% had a male householder with no wife present, and 28.3% were non-families. 24.1% of all households were made up of individuals, and 11.8% had someone living alone who was 65 years of age or older. The average household size was 2.48, and the average family size was 2.97.

The median age in the city was 46 years. 24.6% of residents were under the age of 18; 4.8% were between the ages of 18 and 24; 19% were from 25 to 44; 32% were from 45 to 64; and 19.5% were 65 years of age or older. The gender makeup of the city was 48.7% male and 51.3% female.

== Government ==
Mercer Island is classified as a non-charter code city and operates under a council–manager government. The city council has seven members who are elected at-large to four-year terms and hold monthly meetings twice a month that are open to the public. The council is the lawmaking body of the city government and also selects a mayor and deputy mayor from among their members to serve for two years and preside over meetings. The city manager is the chief executive of the city government and is hired by the city council. David Rosenbaum has served as mayor since 2026; the city manager has been Jessi Bon since 2020.

As of 2024, the city government has 191 employees and an operating budget of $43.4 million. It provides specialized services to its residents, including a municipal court, street maintenance, parks and recreational activities, planning and zoning, and some utilities. Mercer Island closed its city hall and temporarily moved its government offices to an office park in the northeast part of the city in 2023. The original city hall opened in 1957 and underwent extensive renovations in 1988; the building was closed in April 2023 after asbestos was discovered in dust that collected in the heating, ventilation, and air conditioning system. The city council was temporarily moved to a community center on the grounds of Luther Burbank Park, while the municipal court was first moved to Kirkland before a lease with the Newcastle city government was enacted. A new city hall was planned to be built along with a public safety building for the police department on an adjacent property. The city council approved a $103 million bond measure to fund the new buildings that was placed on the November 2025 ballot for voter approval; it did not meet the 60 percent majority required to pass.

The Mercer Island fire department was disbanded in 2024 and replaced by contracted service from Eastside Fire and Rescue, which provides fire protection for several Eastside cities. The fire department's two fire stations were retained along with the firefighters. Mercer Island has its own police department with 37 officers and staff. The city government provides tap water that is delivered by Seattle Public Utilities and stored in two reservoirs that can each hold 2.4 million US gallons (9,100,000 L) of water. Sewage treatment is provided by the King County government through a contract with the Mercer Island government. The Public Works Department operates an office and city shop from a building south of the city hall that was constructed in 1981.

In February 2021, a 6–1 majority of the Mercer Island City Council passed an ordinance prohibiting outdoor camping on public property, mainly to restrict homeless and unhoused people from overnight stays. The ordinance was criticized by the American Civil Liberties Union of Washington and other public advocates for the homeless.

At the federal level, Mercer Island is located in the 9th congressional district, which includes some of southern King County as well as parts of Seattle and Bellevue. The city is part of the 41st legislative district at the state level, which elects one senator and two representatives. The district includes southern Bellevue, Newcastle, and part of Sammamish. The King County Council's 6th district encompasses Mercer Island, Bellevue, Redmond, and other Eastside communities.

== Parks and recreation ==
The city has 481 acres (195 ha) of public lands at 27 parks and open spaces that it manages directly; Mercer Island is also served by other facilities operated by the Mercer Island School District. The park system comprises two regional parks along with six community parks, five neighborhood parks, fourteen mini parks, and open spaces. The community parks include recreational amenities, such as sports fields or beach access, while neighborhood and mini parks are smaller and tailored towards residents in a closer proximity. Mercer Island also has 20 shoreline street ends that provide public access to Lake Washington for swimming, kayaking, and canoeing.

The largest park on the island is Luther Burbank Park, which covers 73 acres (30 ha) on the north side facing Lake Washington. It includes a large undeveloped portion for wildlife conservation alongside a public boat dock, fishing pier, swimming areas, and tennis courts. Luther Burbank Park is on the site of a former boarding school operated by the Seattle School District, which sold the land to King County in 1969 for use as a park. It was transferred to Mercer Island in 2003. A community center was opened in the park by the city in 2005 and hosts events; it includes a gymnasium, dance room, library, catering kitchen, and several program rooms. The city's other regional park, Aubrey Davis Park, was constructed as a 92-acre (37 ha) lid over Interstate 90 in the 1990s as a mitigation measure for the freeway project. The park includes baseball fields, basketball courts, a soccer field, tennis courts, picnic shelters, and sculptures. The Mountains to Sound Greenway, an inter-city bicycle and walking trail, passes through the park and continues across Mercer Island.

Pioneer Park covers 113 acres (0.46 km^{2}) and has equestrian, bicycle, and hiking trails. Deane's Children's Park, also known as "Dragon Park", is a small park with playground equipment including a large concrete dragon structure. In 2010, the city built a well in Rotary Park to supply the area with water in the event of a major disaster, specifically an earthquake.

The school district's holdings include the Mary Wayte Pool, built adjacent to the high school in 1972.

== Culture ==
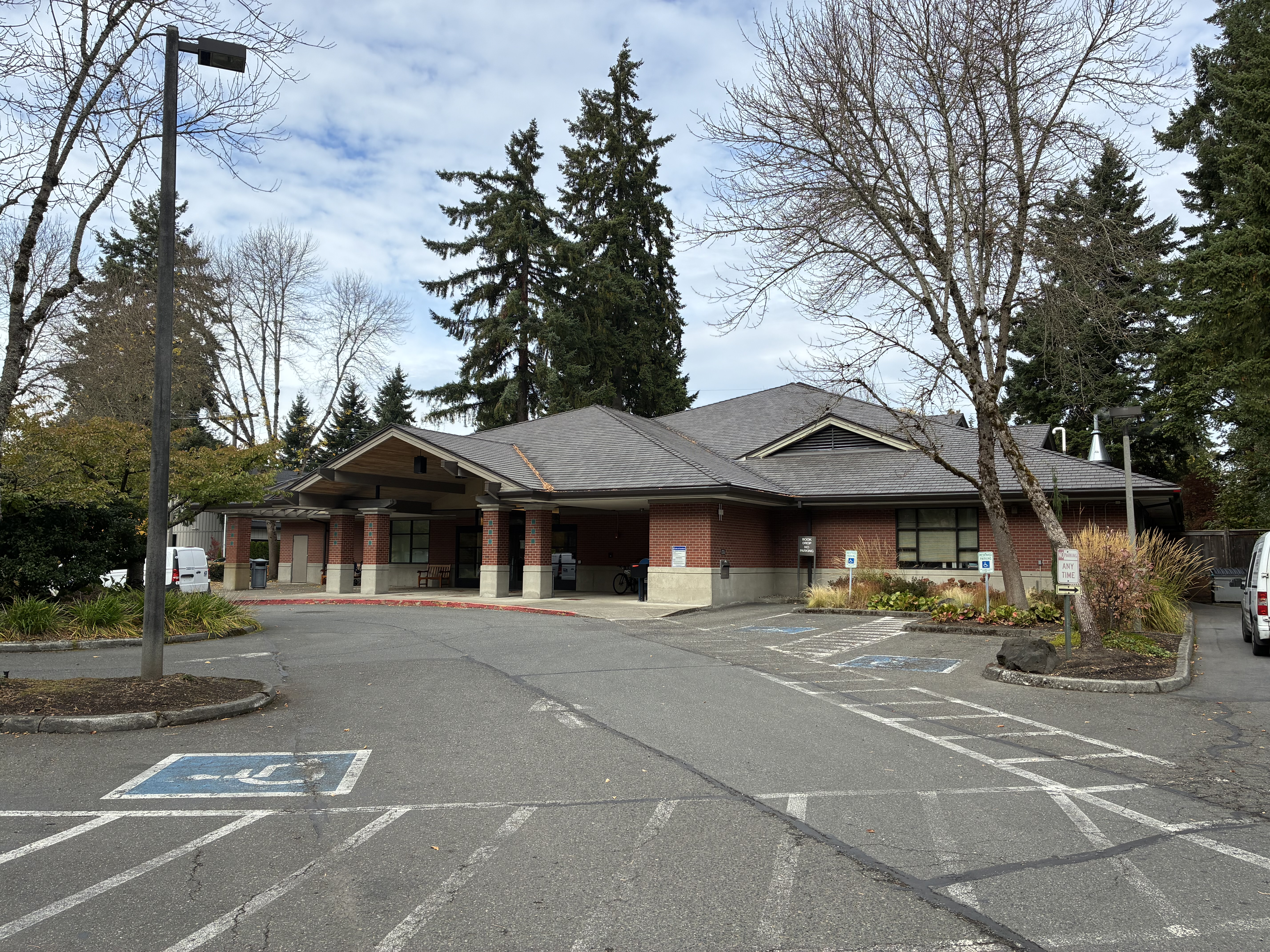
The Mercer Island branch of the King County Library System, opened in 1991

Mercer Island's public library is a branch of the King County Library System, which serves most of King County. The first permanent public library on the island, run by volunteers, opened at a local church in 1945 and moved to a dedicated building in 1953 that was funded by community donations. Ownership of the library was transferred to the new city government in 1960 but remained operated by an independent library board with some services contracted out to the King County Library System. The Mercer Island Library was demolished and replaced by a new building that opened on June 1, 1991, with 14,886 square feet (1,383.0 m^{2}) of space. It was constructed with a $2.18 million municipal bond and remained operated by King County Library System, which fully annexed the city in 1993.

=== Media ===
The Mercer Island Reporter is an online community newspaper that was originally a weekly print publication that began in 1954. After an attempt to merge its newsroom with other newspapers in King County, the Reporter was sold to Sound Publishing in 2006. The print editions were published on Wednesdays and had a circulation of 4,306 in 2012.

=== Annual events ===
- Summer Celebration is a celebration that occurs once a year on the weekend after the 4th of July. It lasted for 30 years before being cancelled in 2019 due to budget cuts. It was revived in 2022.
- The Mercer Island Farmers Market operates most Sundays between June and October. A special version of the market called the Harvest Market occurs on a Sunday in November. There is no farmer's market on the Summer Celebration weekend nor on the Seafair weekend. The market contains local produce including fruit, vegetables and some crafts.

== Education ==
The Mercer Island School District operates seven schools on the island: four elementary schools (Lakeridge Elementary, Island Park Elementary, West Mercer Elementary, and Northwood Elementary); one middle school (Islander Middle School); one high school (Mercer Island High School); and one alternative secondary school (Crest Learning Center). The school district had an enrollment of 3,993 students in the 2024–25 school year, with 222 total teachers. Mercer Island had been served by the East Seattle School, a consolidated school that opened in 1914 and was replaced by the modern high school and middle school in the 1950s.

Mercer Island is also home to several private schools with curriculums tailored towards specific learning programs, religious education, or other needs. These include St. Monica Catholic School, the French American School of Puget Sound, and the Northwest Yeshiva High School (grades 9–12).

== Infrastructure ==
=== Transportation ===
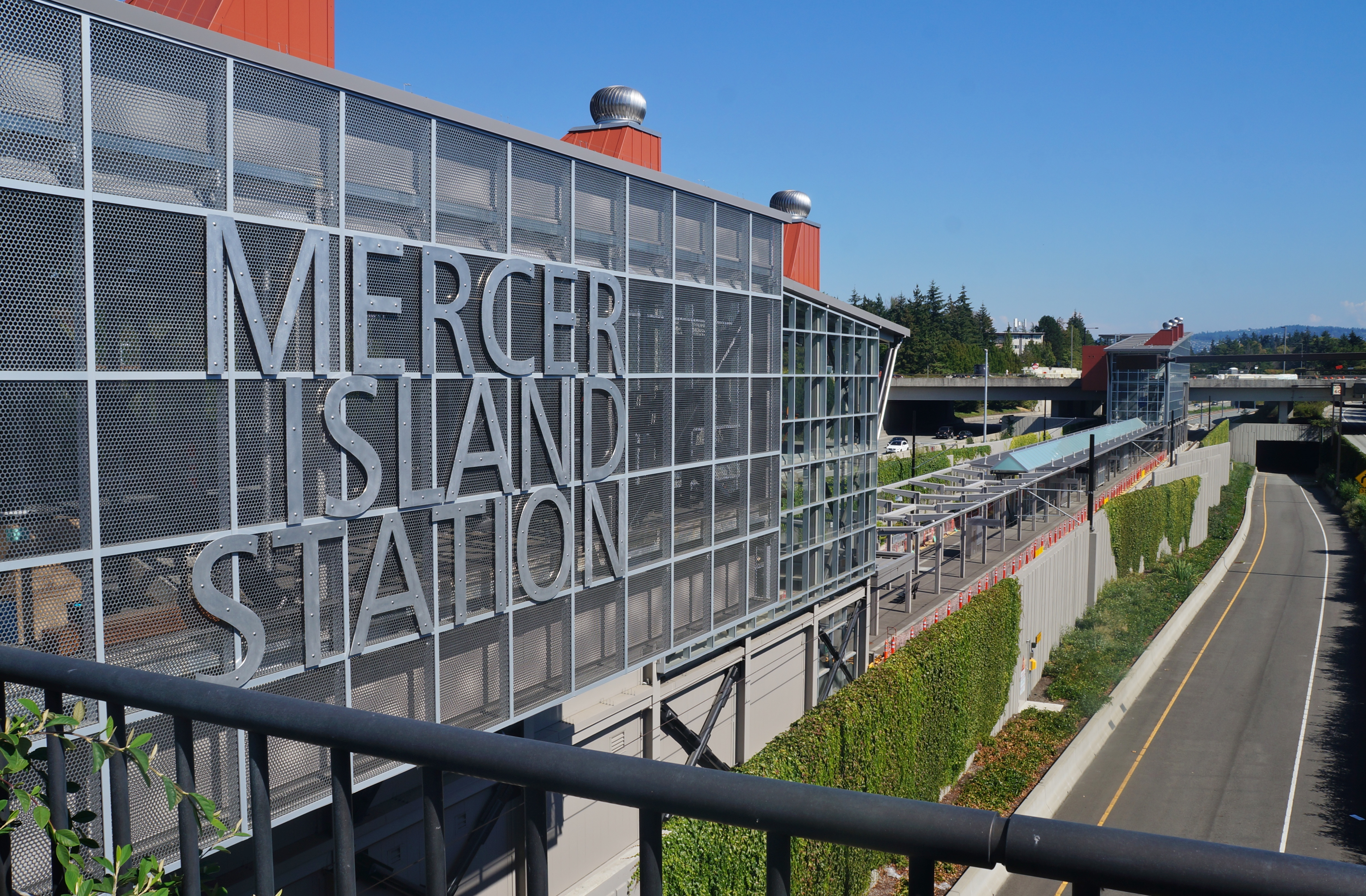
The Mercer Island light rail station in the median of Interstate 90, served by the 2 Line

Mercer Island is bisected by Interstate 90, which connects the city to Seattle in the west and Bellevue in the east. The freeway travels over the Lacey V. Murrow and Homer M. Hadley floating bridges over Lake Washington to Seattle and the East Channel Bridge towards Bellevue. The bridges also carry the Mountains to Sound Greenway, which includes a multi-purpose pedestrian and bicycle path. A significant section of the freeway is recessed below street level and covered by the Mercer Island Lid, which includes several parks. The city maintains 75 miles (121 km) of streets on the island.

Sound Transit provides rail transportation to the city on the 2 Line, which stops at a light rail station in the median of Interstate 90 at 80th Avenue Southeast. The line continues west to Seattle over the Homer M. Hadley Memorial Bridge and east to Bellevue and Redmond. The station opened on March 28, 2026, and includes a park-and-ride lot with 447 stalls that had previously only served bus routes. Sound Transit and King County Metro operate express bus routes from Mercer Island station to other areas of the Eastside. The original park-and-ride lot was expanded into a two-story parking garage in 2008. All-day local service for most of the island is provided by Metro Route 204, which is supplemented by Route 630 and several school bus routes during peak periods.

=== Utilities ===
The city's utilities are managed by the government or contracted out to other public and private entities. Electric power and natural gas on the island is provided by Puget Sound Energy, a private company with a long-term franchise with the city government. Puget Sound Energy maintains 6.2 miles (10.0 km) of transmission lines and three substations that are supplied by two underwater electric transmission cables: one along the East Channel Bridge to Bellevue; and another crossing from the southeast of the island to Renton. The city government distributes tap water that is purchased from Seattle Public Utilities, which primarily sources its water from the Cedar River watershed. The island's water is delivered through a transmission pipe across the East Channel from Bellevue and is distributed to 113 miles (182 km) of water mains, two pump stations, and two storage reservoirs. The two storage reservoirs were constructed in 1962 and 1975; each can hold 4 million US gallons (15,000,000 L) of water.

The sewage system operated by the city government includes 113 miles (182 km) of pipes—of which 12.9 miles (20.8 km) is embedded into the shallow Lake Washington floor—and 17 pump stations that transport wastewater off the island. The wastewater is then treated by King County at one of their regional facilities. Stormwater is released through a mix of open drainage into Lake Washington and catch basins that is collected for treatment. Solid waste is contracted out to Recology, which provides curbside collection of garbage, recycling, and compostable food/yard waste. The company transports material to several processing facilities, including the Cedar Hills Regional Landfill.

== Notable people ==
- Paul Allen, co-founder of Microsoft and Seattle Seahawks owner
- Frank Blethen, publisher of The Seattle Times
- Matthew Boyd, professional baseball player for the Chicago Cubs
- Ann Dunham, mother of former President Barack Obama
- Jean Enersen, journalist and longtime KING-TV news anchor
- Aaron Levie, CEO and co-founder of Box, Inc.
- Rashard Lewis, professional basketball player
- George Lightfoot, proponent of building the Lacey V. Murrow Memorial Bridge
- Howard Lincoln, former chairman of Nintendo of America and the Seattle Mariners
- Joel McHale, actor and comedian
- Michael Medved, radio show host, author, political commentator and film critic
- Steve Miller, musician from the Steve Miller Band
- Jordan Morris, soccer player for Seattle Sounders FC
- Alan Mulally, former CEO of Ford
- Ted Rand, illustrator
- Julio Rodríguez, professional baseball player for the Seattle Mariners
- Bill Russell, professional basketball player and coach, Basketball Hall of Famer,
- George Russell, serial killer
- Kyle Seager, professional baseball player
- Frank Shrontz, former CEO and chairman of Boeing
- Quin Snyder, head coach of the Atlanta Hawks
- Gordon D. Sondland, politician and 20th U.S. ambassador to the European Union
- Mary Wayte, swimmer and two-time Olympic gold medalist

== Sister cities ==
- Thonon-les-Bains, France (since 2000)
