= Lacey V. Murrow Memorial Bridge =

Floating bridge in Seattle, Washington, U.S.

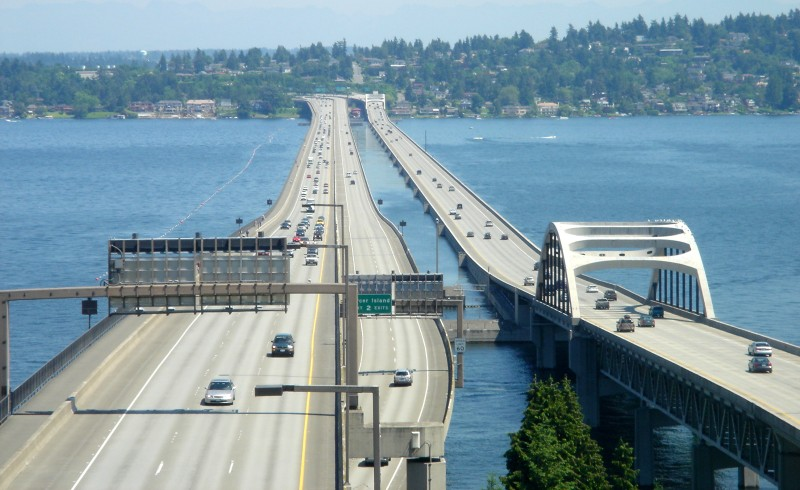
- The Lacey V. Murrow Memorial Bridge (right) and the Homer M. Hadley Memorial Bridge (left) in 2005, looking east toward Mercer Island
- Coordinates: 47°35′24″N 122°16′12″W
- Carries: I-90 (4 eastbound lanes)
- Crosses: Lake Washington
- Locale: Seattle / Mercer Island, Washington, U.S.
- Maintained by: Washington State Department of Transportation

Characteristics
- Design: Pontoon bridge
- Total length: 6,620 ft (2,020 m)

History
- Opened: July 2, 1940
- Rebuilt: September 12, 1993

Location
- Interactive map of Lacey V. Murrow Memorial Bridge

The Lacey V. Murrow Memorial Bridge is a floating bridge in the Seattle metropolitan area of the U.S. state of Washington. It is one of two floating bridges that carries Interstate 90 across Lake Washington from Seattle to Mercer Island. The Murrow Bridge carries four lanes of eastbound traffic, while westbound traffic is carried by the adjacent Homer M. Hadley Memorial Bridge.

The Murrow Bridge is the second-longest floating bridge in the world, at 6,620 ft (2,020 m) (the longest is the Governor Albert D. Rosellini Bridge–Evergreen Point, a few miles north on the same lake). The original Murrow Bridge opened in 1940, and was named the Lake Washington Floating Bridge. It was renamed the Lacey V. Murrow bridge in 1967. The original bridge closed in 1989; the current bridge opened in 1993.

Along with the east portals of the Mount Baker Ridge Tunnel, the bridge is an official City of Seattle landmark and a National Historic Civil Engineering Landmark. While the bridge originally had an opening span at the center of the bridge to allow a horizontal opening of 202 feet (62 m) for major waterborne traffic, the only boat passages currently are elevated fixed spans at the termini with 29 feet (8.8 m) of vertical clearance.

== History ==
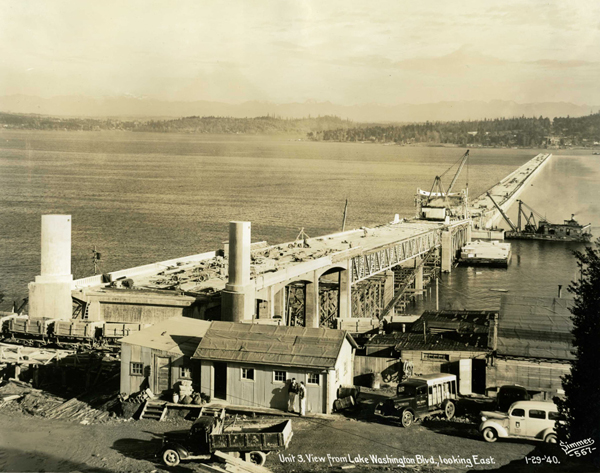
Construction of the bridge; photo taken one year after start of construction.

The bridge was the brainchild of engineer Homer Hadley, who had made the first proposal in 1921. The bridge came about after intensive lobbying, particularly by George Lightfoot, who came to be called the "father of the bridge." Lightfoot began campaigning for the bridge in 1930, enlisting the support of Eastside businessman Miller Freeman. The proposed floating bridge was met with skepticism and was heavily criticized by The Seattle Times, which later issued an apology in a front-page editorial before it opened. Construction began on January 1, 1939, and was completed by the Washington State Toll Bridge Authority in 1940. The project was partially financed by a bond issue of $4.184 million and the total cost, including approaches, was approximately $9 million. The bridge was built under a 1 1/2-year contract awarded to the Puget Sound Bridge and Dredging Company in the amount of $3.254 million.

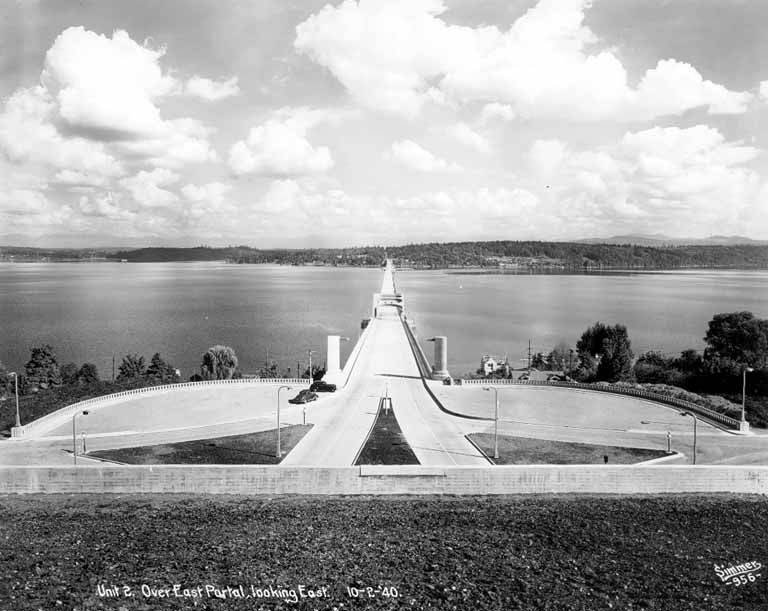
The bridge in 1940, photographed from the East Portal Viewpoint

The Lake Washington Floating Bridge opened on July 2, 1940, and carried a section of the Sunset Highway, then part of US 10 (later decommissioned and replaced by Interstate 90). The existing Lake Washington ferries from Seattle to Mercer Island and Medina were both immediately discontinued, while the Seattle–Kirkland run remained in service. The Mercer Island and Medina ferries carried a total of 164,614 vehicles in 1939; a majority of traffic between Seattle and the east side of the lake was carried on other highways. Bridge tolls of 25 cents for single-occupant automobiles, 35 cents to $2 for trucks, 10 cents for bicycles, 5 cents for pedestrians, and 35 to 50 cents for horse-drawn vehicles were collected at a toll plaza on Mercer Island. The tolls were removed on July 2, 1949, after the bonds had been paid off 19 years ahead of schedule.

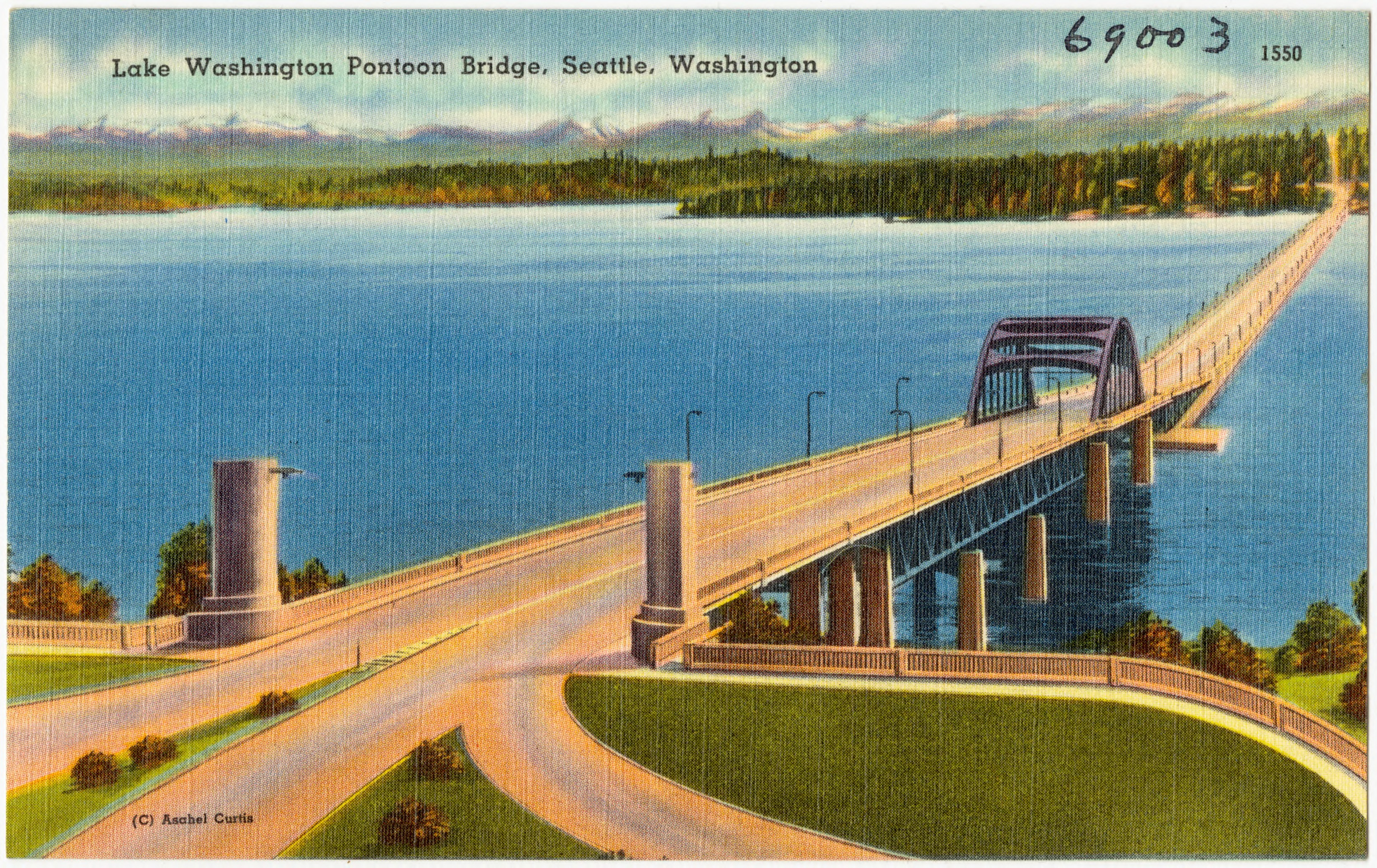
1950s postcard of the bridge

The bridge was renamed the Lacey V. Murrow Memorial Bridge in 1967. The eponymous Lacey V. Murrow (1904–1966) was the second director of the Washington State Highway Department and a highly decorated U.S. Air Force officer who served as a bomber pilot in World War II, rising to the rank of brigadier general. A 1925 graduate of Washington State College in Pullman, he was the oldest brother of CBS commentator Edward R. Murrow.

The original bridge included a movable span that could be retracted into a pocket in the center of the fixed span to permit large boats to pass. This design resulted in a roadway bulge that required vehicles to swerve twice across polished steel joints as they passed the bulge. A reversible lane system, indicated by lighted overhead lane control signals with arrow and 'X' signs, compounded the hazard by putting one lane of traffic on the "wrong" side of the bulge during morning and evening rush hours in an effort to alleviate traffic into or out of Seattle. There were many serious collisions on the bridge. The problems grew worse as the traffic load increased over the years and far outstripped the designed capacity.

Renovation or replacement became essential and a parallel bridge, the Homer M. Hadley Memorial Bridge, was completed in 1989, and named for Hadley in 1993. With the opening of the new bridge, the 49-year-old Murrow Bridge closed on June 23, 1989, for renovation that was projected to take three years. The bridge sank in a storm on November 25, 1990, during refurbishment and repair. There were no fatalities or injuries.

== 1990 disaster ==
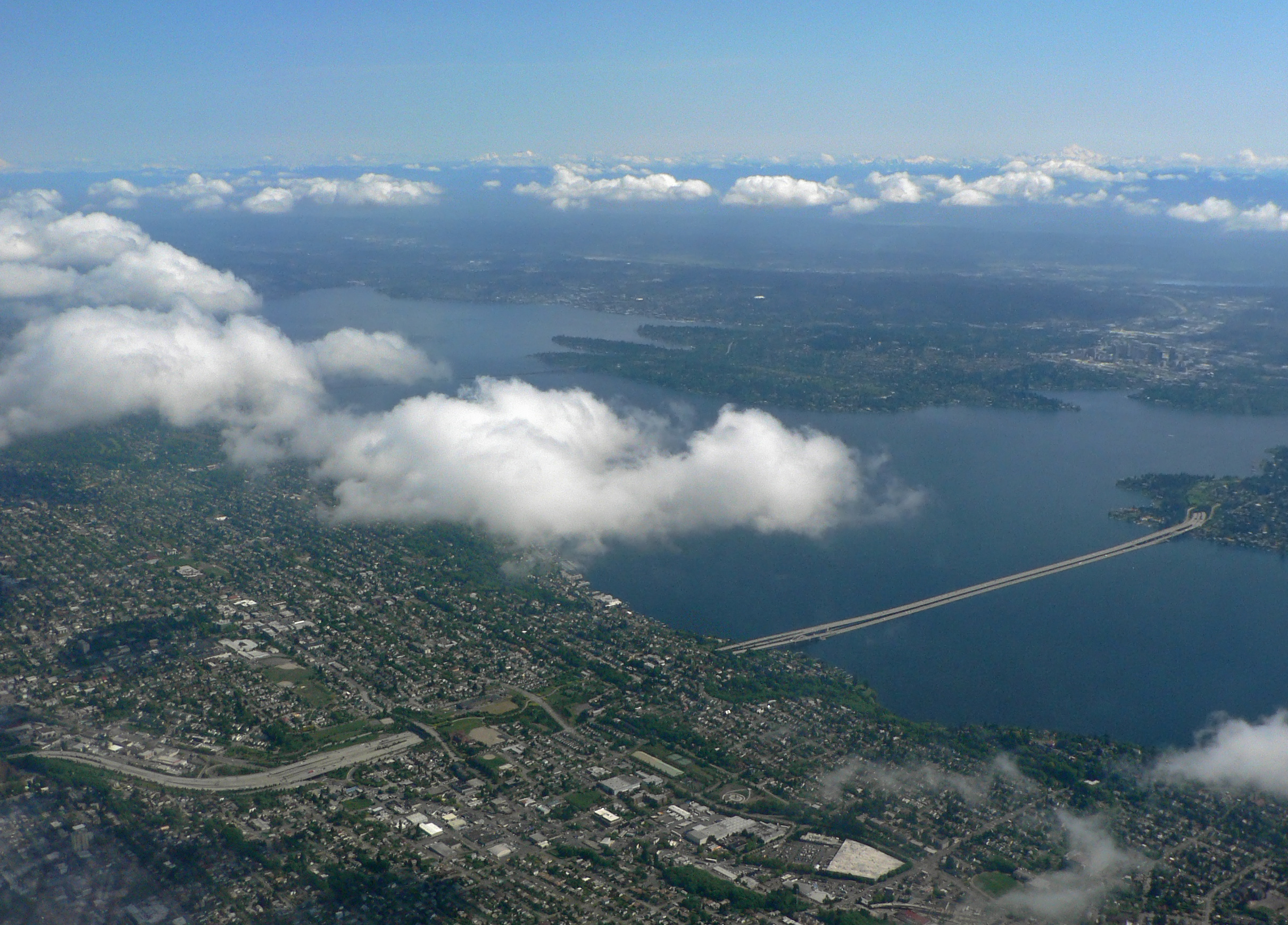
View northeast of bridge, west approach and Mount Baker Tunnel

On November 25, 1990, while under re-construction, the original bridge sank because of a series of human errors and decisions. The process started because the bridge needed resurfacing and was to be widened by means of cantilevered additions in order to meet the necessary lane-width specifications of the Interstate Highway System. The Washington State Department of Transportation (WSDOT) decided to use hydrodemolition (high-pressure water) to remove unwanted material (the sidewalks on the bridge deck). Water from this hydrodemolition was considered contaminated under environmental law and could not be allowed to flow into Lake Washington. Engineers then analyzed the pontoons of the bridge, and realized that they were over-engineered and the water could be stored temporarily in the pontoons. The watertight doors for the pontoons were therefore removed.

A large storm on November 22–24 (the Thanksgiving holiday weekend), filled some of the pontoons with rain and lake water. On Saturday, November 24, workers noticed that the bridge was about to sink, and started pumping out some of the pontoons; on Sunday, November 25, a 2,790-foot (850 m) section of the bridge sank, dumping the contaminated water into the lake along with tons of bridge material. It sank when one pontoon filled and dragged the rest down, because they were cabled together and there was no way to separate the sections under load. No one was hurt or killed, since the bridge was closed for renovation and the sinking took some time. All of the sinking was captured on film and shown on live TV. The cost of the disaster was $69 million in damages. A dozen anchoring cables for the new Hadley bridge were severed, and it was closed for a short time afterward. Westbound traffic was allowed on Tuesday, and eastbound traffic was resumed in early December.

The disaster delayed the bridge's reopening by 14 months, to September 12, 1993.

=== Precedents and lessons learned ===
WSDOT had lost another floating bridge, the Hood Canal Bridge, in February 1979 under similar circumstances. It is now known that the other major floating bridge in Washington, the Evergreen Point Floating Bridge, was under-engineered for local environmental conditions; that 1963 bridge was replaced with a new floating span in 2016.

== See also ==
- List of bridges documented by the Historic American Engineering Record in Washington (state)
- List of bridges in Seattle
- Homer M. Hadley Memorial Bridge
