= George Lightfoot =

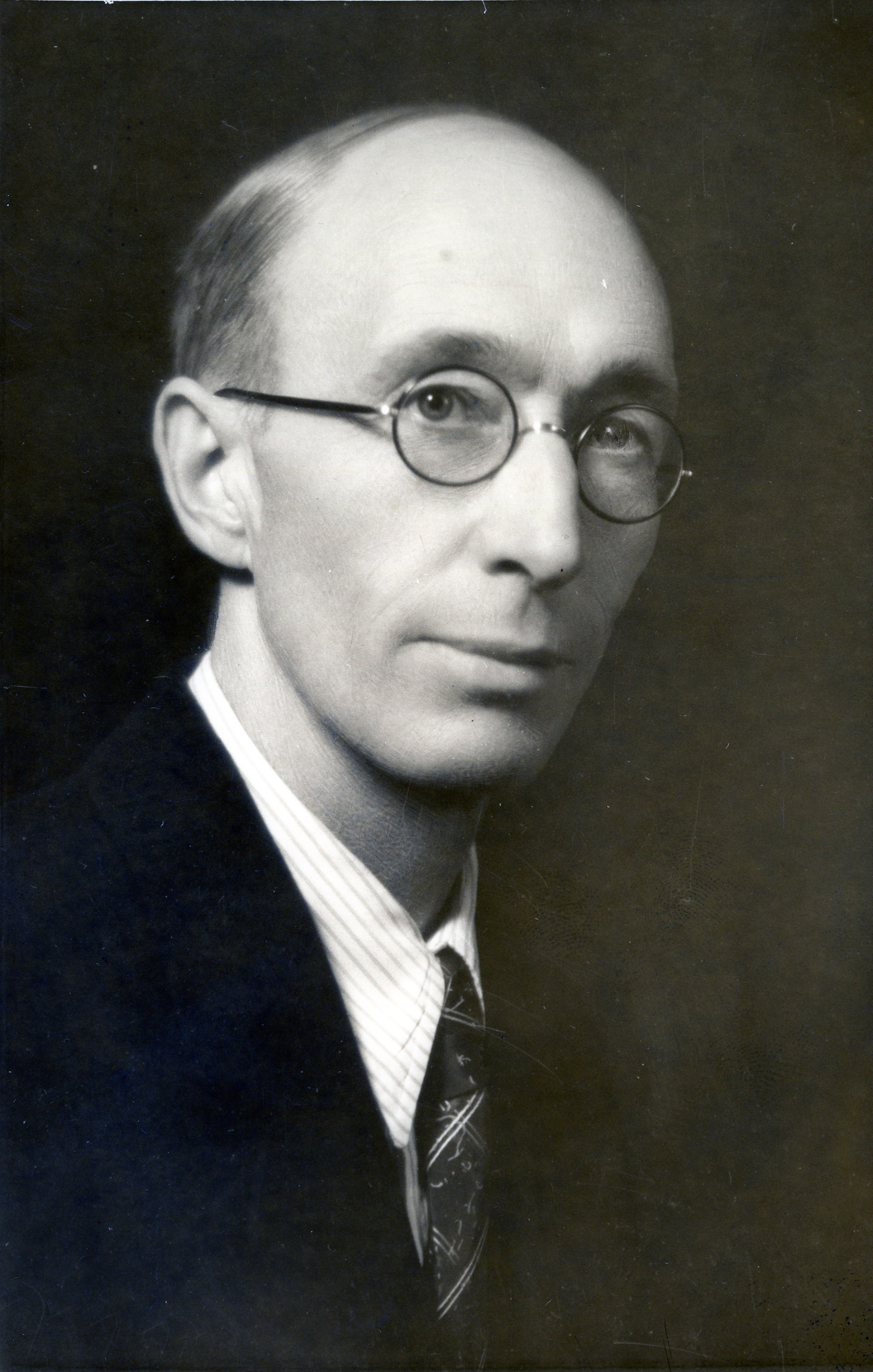
George Lightfoot circa 1935

George Washington Lightfoot (1889 – 1941) was an American business owner, known campaigning for more than 12 years to build what was then known as the Lake Washington Floating Bridge connecting the island to Seattle across Lake Washington. Lightfoot, commonly known as "Speed", and his brother, Ewart Gladstone Lightfoot, commonly known as "Hap", ran Lightfoot Enterprises on Mercer Island from 1914 through the early 1980s.

Lightfoot Enterprises included the first grocery store, post office, gas station, dance/movie hall and bakery on Mercer Island. George Lightfoot was also a talented vaudeville musician who performed under the stage name "The Jolly Hobo Globetrotter" along with his sister, Eva, known as "The Mandolin Banjo Fiend".

Lightfoot was born in Denver, Colorado in 1889. He died in Mercer Island, Washington in 1941.
