= Northwest Yeshiva High School =

Coordinates: 47°33′29.51″N 122°13′11.94″W

- 5017 90th Avenue S.E. Mercer Island, Washington 98040; United States

Information
- Type: Jewish High School
- Established: 1974
- CEEB code: 481173
- NCES School ID: 01913756
- Principal: Deirdre Schreiber
- Head of School: Rabbi Ben Aaronson
- Faculty: 29
- Grades: High School
- Gender: coed
- Enrollment: 65
- Campus type: Urban
- Colors: Gold, Navy Blue
- Athletics: WIAA Class IB
- Mascot: Lions
- Accreditation: Northwest Accreditation Commission (NWAC)
- Website: www.nyhs.org

Located in Mercer Island, Washington, Northwest Yeshiva High School is the state's only accredited, co-ed, college preparatory, dual-curriculum Jewish High School.

== History ==
Northwest Yeshiva High School/NYHS was founded in 1974 to incubate a Jewish environment for higher college preparatory learning in the region. Originally, it was housed in the basement of the Seattle Hebrew Academy. In 1992, it moved to Mercer Island, Washington to the campus that it occupies today. Rabbi Bernie Fox retired in 2016 as Head of School after 31 years in the position. Jason Feld, former dean of students at Shalhevet High School in Los Angeles, assumed the role of Head of School in July 2017. He led the school for six years before accepting a position in Dallas. In the fall of 2023, Rabbi Yehudah Gabay became the first Sephardic Head of School before leaving the position in 2025. The current head of school is Rabbi Dr. Ben Aaronson, an alumnus of the school.

== Facilities ==
The school's suburban campus includes a sanctuary for prayer, multifunctional classrooms, STEM Lab, science lab, art studio, a lunchroom, and an outdoor sport court.

== Curriculum ==
Northwest Yeshiva's curriculum is integrated, encompassing both Judaic studies, including comprehensive Torah study that emphasis the development of critical thinking skills, as well as College Preparatory Academics.

The school is accredited by the Northwest Accreditation Commission (NWAC).

=== Judaic Studies ===
In 2019, Rabbi Naftali Rothstein joined the faculty as the Campus Rabbi as well being the dean of Judaics. Rabbi Dr. Jeremy Wieder, a Rosh Yeshiva at Yeshiva University, is the school's Halachic (Jewish law) authority.

=== College Preparatory Studies ===
NYHS offers College in the High School courses in which students can earn University of Washington college credit. Currently, NYHS offers this option for Calculus A & B, Biology, Expository Writing, Environmental Science and Human Physiology. Freshmen have the opportunity to take a full STEM (Science, Technology, Engineering, Math) curriculum thanks to NYHS's partnership with the Center for Initiatives in Jewish Education and the Samis Foundation.

NYHS students and faculty engage in monthly Town Halls, open to the public. The student led, Agenda Committee, organizes and guides the civil discourse opportunities. Topics are proposed by the student body and often are focused on school and communal issues.

=== Israel and Experiential Studies ===
Learning about and supporting the centrality of the State of Israel in Jewish life today is a key component of an NYHS education. Students travel to Israel and Poland during their senior year to participate on the March of the Living.

In 2022, NYHS seniors were the first teen group in the United States to volunteer with NCSY Relief in Romania at the Tikva House with Ukrainian refugee and orphans who had fled Odesa, Ukraine.

=== Journalism ===
NYHS's student newspaper, the Mane Idea won three top prizes at the Columbia University's Jewish Scholastic Press Association conference in the Spring of 2023 and in 2024. Three NYHS students won for their stories in the Mane Idea.

== Athletics ==
A member of the Washington Interscholastic Activities Association (WIAA), within the State Class IB, Northwest Yeshiva competes in multiple sports. The school changed its team name from the 613s, a reference to the Torah's total number of mitzvot or commandments, to the Lions in memory of Ari Grashin Z"L, a student of NYHS who died in 2002–Ari being the Hebrew word for lion.

The Lions compete in men's basketball, women's basketball, women's volleyball, and co-ed cross-country, golf, and track.

The Lions girls volleyball competed in the annual Atlanta Jewish Academy Girls Volleyball Invitational in the fall of 2023.

In 2022, the men's Lions basketball team competed in the Washington State Championship and placed 5th overall.

In 2010, a WIAA State Girls' Basketball Tournament conflicted with Purim's Fast of Esther. The school's team, who had made it to State for the first time, had to balance religious obligations with playing and, in the end, decided there would be "no forfeit of faith," garnering significant media coverage. Again in 2011, a WIAA State Girls' Volleyball Tournament conflicted, this time with the Sabbath. Northwest's team once again decided "no forfeit of faith."

== Affiliations ==
- Jewish Federation of Greater Seattle
- Samis Foundation
- Prizmah
