= Homer M. Hadley Memorial Bridge =

Floating bridge in Seattle, Washington, U.S.

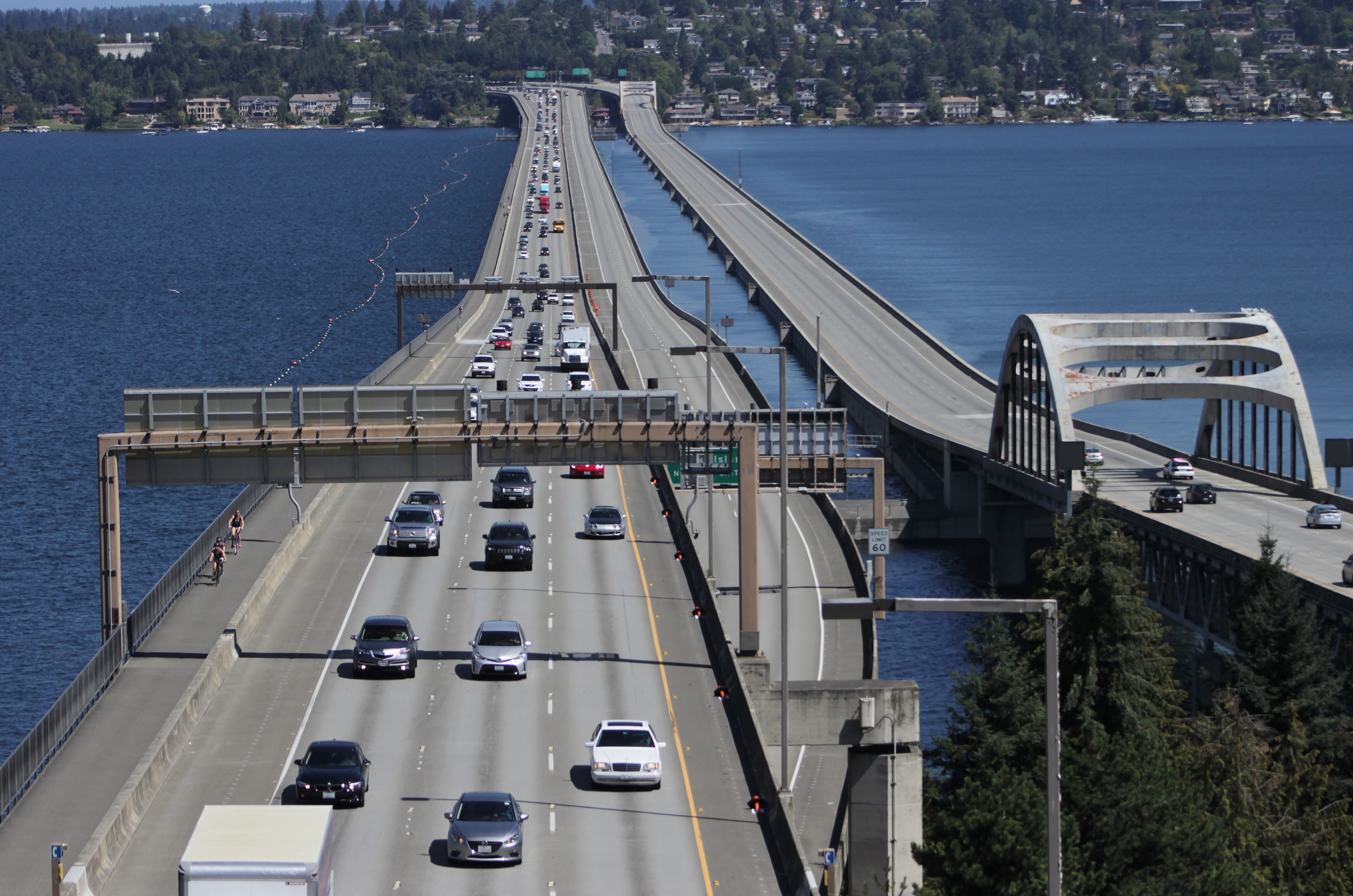
- The two spans of the Homer M. Hadley Memorial Bridge (left) and the Lacey V. Murrow Memorial Bridge (right) in 2016, looking east toward Mercer Island
- Coordinates: 47°35′23″N 122°16′08″W
- Carries: I-90 (4 westbound lanes); 2 Line (2 tracks)
- Crosses: Lake Washington
- Locale: Seattle, Washington, U.S.
- Maintained by: Washington State Department of Transportation
- Preceded by: Lacey V. Murrow Memorial Bridge

Characteristics
- Design: Pontoon bridge
- Total length: 5,811 ft (1,771 m)

History
- Opened: June 4, 1989

Location
- Interactive map of Homer M. Hadley Memorial Bridge

The Homer M. Hadley Memorial Bridge, also known as the Third Lake Washington Bridge, is a floating bridge in the Seattle metropolitan area of the U.S. state of Washington. It is one of the Interstate 90 floating bridges, carrying the westbound lanes of Interstate 90 and two tracks of the 2 Line, a Link light rail line, across Lake Washington between Mercer Island and Seattle. The floating bridge is the fifth-longest of its kind in the world, at 5,811 feet (1,772 m).

== History ==
A third floating bridge on Lake Washington was proposed in the 1950s during construction of the Evergreen Point Floating Bridge to the north. After several locations were considered, a span parallel to the existing Lake Washington Floating Bridge (now the Lacey V. Murrow Memorial Bridge) was chosen in the 1960s. The first pontoon for the new bridge was floated from Everett to Lake Washington in September 1983. The 18 pontoons, made in Everett and Tacoma were installed over a four-year period and fully connected by late 1987; they are 105 feet (32 m) wide when including cantilevered sections added later due to the narrow size of the Ballard Locks.

The bridge opened in June 1989 and was named in 1993 for Homer More Hadley, who designed the bridge's companion span, the parallel Lacey V. Murrow Memorial Bridge. Hadley also designed the McMillin Bridge in Pierce County. It originally carried bidirectional traffic while the older Murrow Bridge underwent extensive renovations. On November 25, 1990, sections of the Murrow Bridge sank during a windstorm that flooded several pontoons; the sinking sections also severed 13 of the 58 anchor cables of the Hadley Bridge, which remained closed for several days.

Following the reopening of the Lacey V. Murrow Memorial Bridge, two reversible high-occupancy vehicle (HOV) lanes were set up on the Hadley Bridge to accommodate the traffic flow between Seattle and the suburban Eastside (westbound in the morning, eastbound in the evenings). The lanes were opened to all Mercer Island commuters, including single-occupant vehicles, per a 1978 agreement negotiated by the city government. The reversible lanes were planned to be converted for light rail use at a future date, but design issues prevented a simple conversion from being feasible.

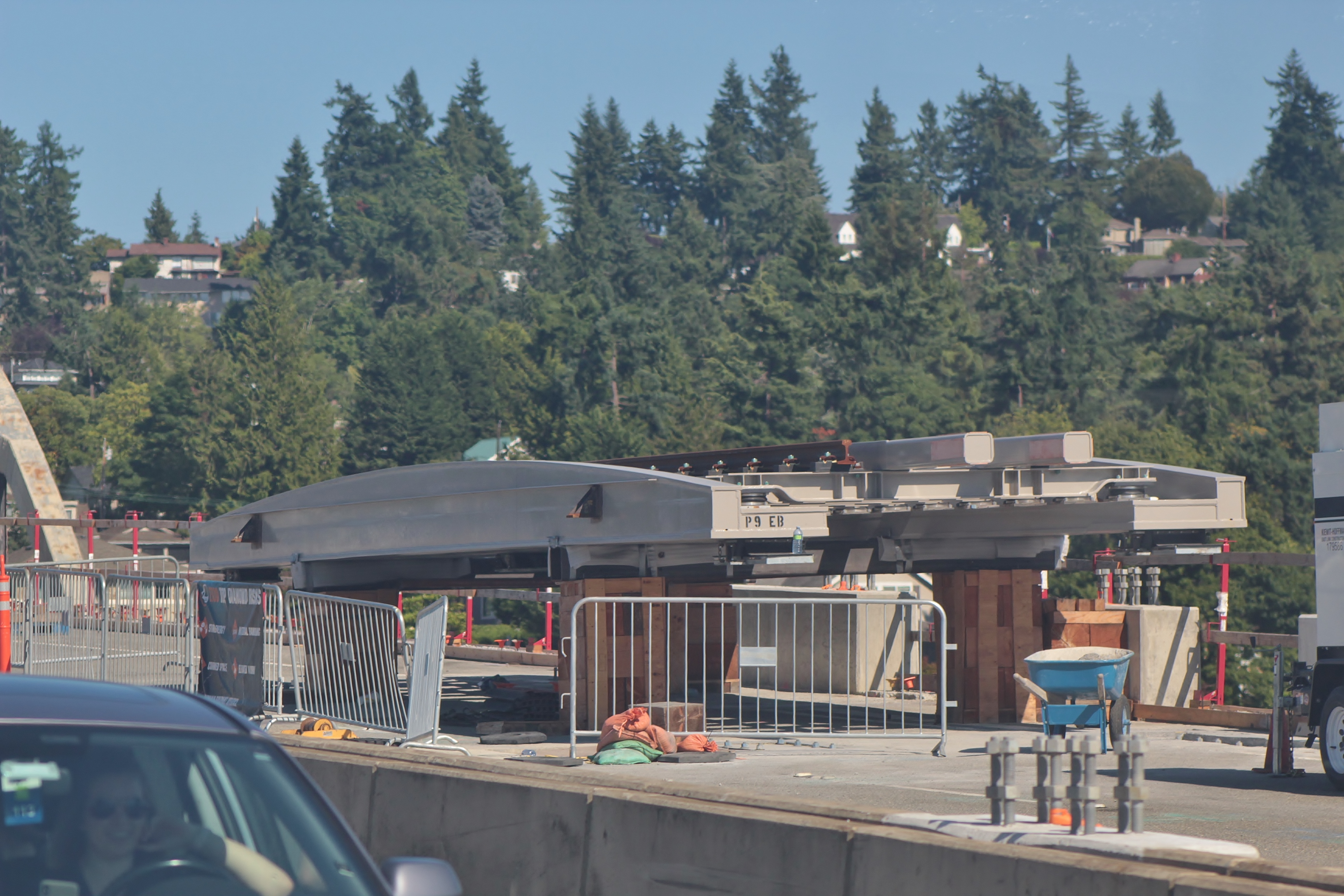
Track bridge for the Link 2 Line, preparing for installation on Homer M. Hadley Memorial Bridge, 2019

Sound Transit and the Washington State Department of Transportation added HOV lanes to the bridge's westbound lanes in 2017. This preceded construction of the 2 Line, a light rail line from downtown Seattle to Bellevue and Redmond which uses the former reversible express lanes. This section of the 2 Line, completed in March 2026, is now the first permanent electrified railroad on a floating bridge. The light rail line employs a set of floating spans for tracks on the transition between pontoons and the fixed spans.

== Usage ==
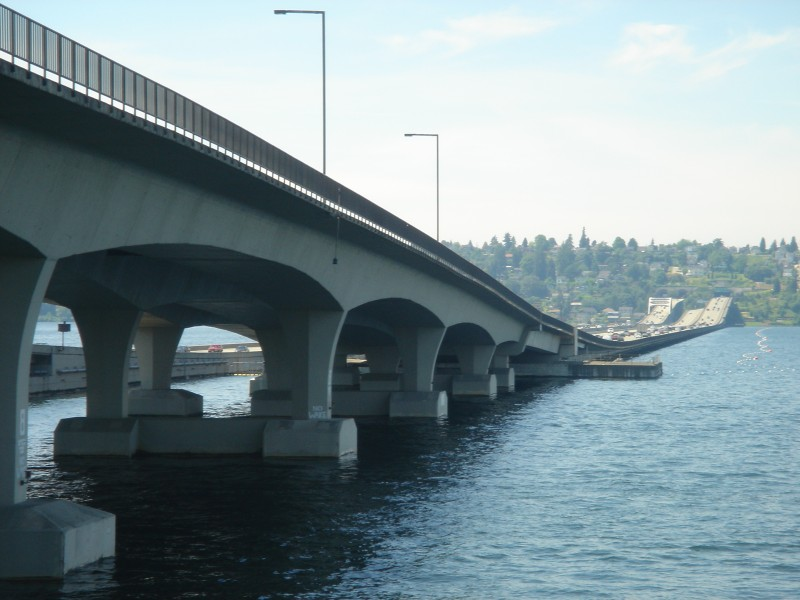
Looking west toward Seattle, Washington

The bridge carries four westbound lanes, including a HOV lane, as well as a bicycle and pedestrian path on the north side. The path is 9 feet (2.7 m) wide and includes two barriers: a 54-inch (140 cm) outer railing and a 35-inch (89 cm) concrete barrier facing traffic. To the south of the lanes is a set of two Link light rail tracks that carry the 2 Line that are separated from vehicular traffic by a concrete barrier.

Prior to 2017, it also carried two reversible lanes, configured to normally carry westbound traffic on weekday mornings and eastbound traffic at other times. Use of the reversible express lanes was restricted to HOV traffic, except for vehicles traveling to and from Mercer Island. The express lanes were closed to road traffic on June 5, 2017, rebuilt for light rail and are dedicated for the trains of 2 Line which was fully opened on March 28, 2026.

With a total of five traffic lanes and three full-sized shoulders, the Third Lake Washington Bridge was the widest floating bridge in the world, until the completion of the new Evergreen Point Floating Bridge in 2016.

== See also ==
- Lacey V. Murrow Memorial Bridge
- List of Seattle bridges
