= Evergreen Point Floating Bridge (1963) =

Former highway floating bridge in Seattle, Washington, United States

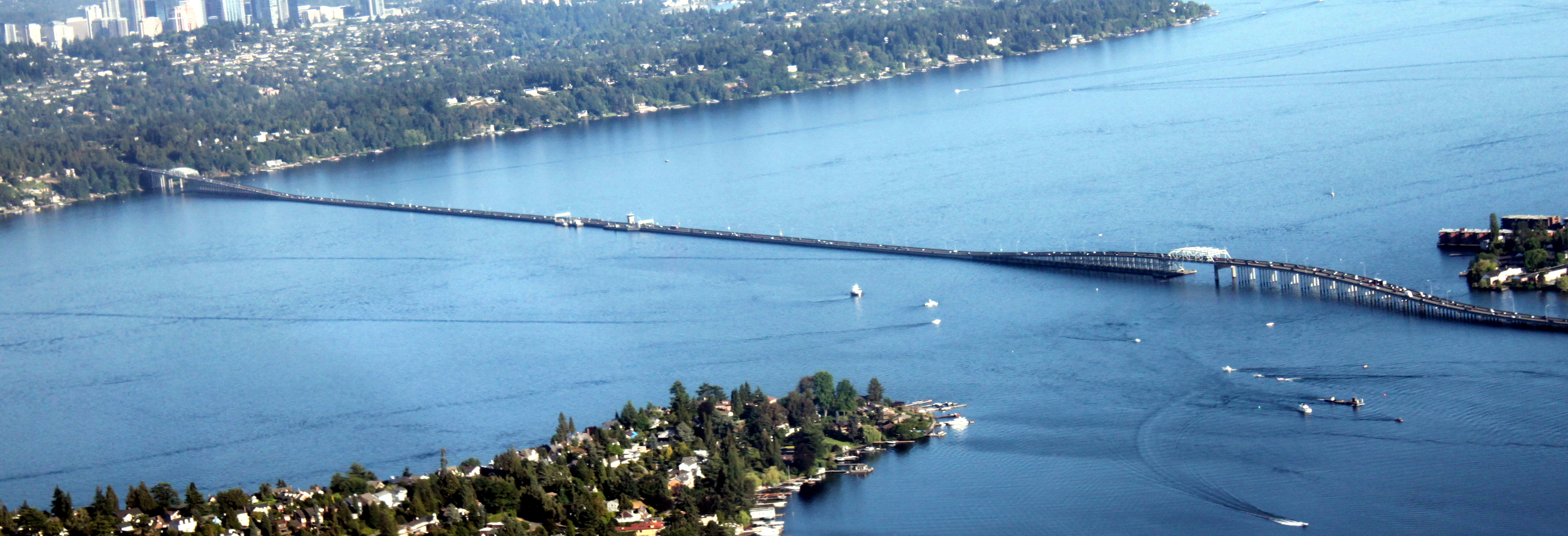
- The bridge in 2009. Column-supported high-rises near the ends of the bridge are connected by a floating section.
- Coordinates: 47°38′26″N 122°15′36″W
- Carries: 4 lanes of SR 520
- Crosses: Lake Washington
- Locale: Seattle to Medina (Washington, U.S.)
- Official name: Governor Albert D. Rosellini Bridge
- Maintained by: Washington State Department of Transportation

Characteristics
- Design: Pontoon bridge with movable midsections
- Total length: 7,578 feet (2,310 m)

History
- Opened: August 28, 1963
- Closed: April 22, 2016
- Replaced by: Evergreen Point Floating Bridge replacement (2016)

Location
- Interactive map of Evergreen Point Floating Bridge (1963)

The Evergreen Point Floating Bridge, officially the Governor Albert D. Rosellini Bridge, and commonly called the SR 520 Bridge or 520 Bridge, was a floating bridge in the U.S. state of Washington that carried State Route 520 across Lake Washington, connecting Medina with the Montlake neighborhood of Seattle.

The bridge's total length was approximately 15,580 feet (4,750 m) and it carried four lanes of traffic, two in each direction. Its 7,578-foot (2,310 m) floating section was the longest floating bridge in the world until April 11, 2016, when its replacement exceeded it by 130 feet (40 m).

The bridge was named for Evergreen Point, the westernmost of the three small Eastside peninsulas that SR 520 crosses. (The other two are Hunts Point and Yarrow Point.) In 1988, it was renamed for the state's 15th governor, Albert D. Rosellini, who had advocated its construction.

Although there were plans to replace the bridge several years following its completion, it was not until much later that investigations revealed the aging bridge to be in poor condition and unable to withstand the major hazards for which it was originally designed. This finding may have accelerated plans to finally replace it. In response to these hazards and the need to expand the current infrastructure, construction on a replacement began in 2012; the new bridge opened in April 2016. The original bridge was closed to traffic on April 22, 2016, and was disassembled over the following months.

== History ==
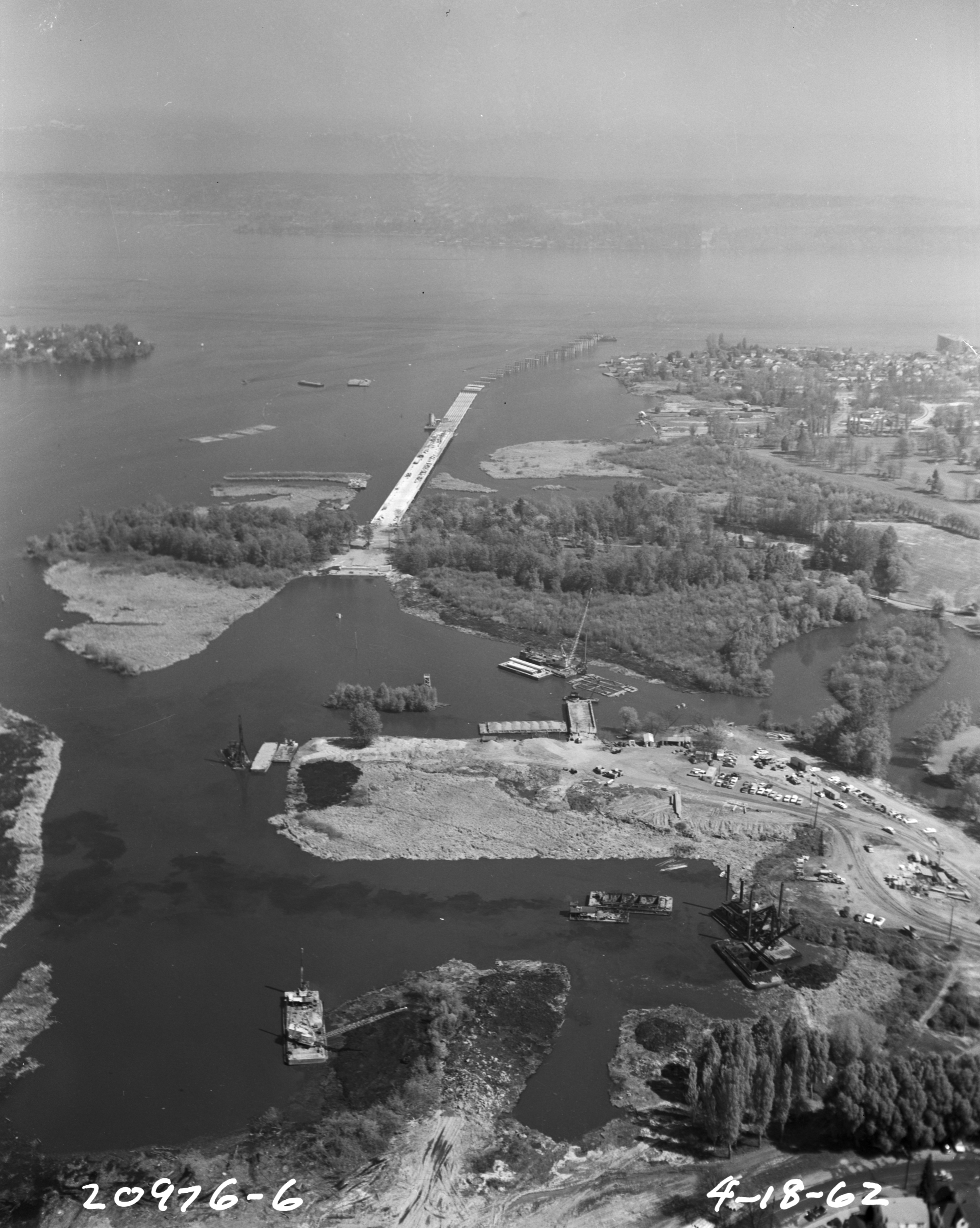
Aerial view of the Evergreen Point Floating Bridge under construction, 1962. This shows the causeway extending from Foster Island in the Washington Park Arboretum roughly east to where Union Bay opens up into Lake Washington. Evergreen Point is across the lake.

The bridge was opened for commuter traffic on August 28, 1963, after three years of construction. It was built as a four-lane toll bridge to provide easy access from Seattle to Eastside communities such as Bellevue, Kirkland, and Redmond. The total cost of the bridge, in 1961 dollars, was $24.7 million (equivalent to $266 million in 2025). To make up for this cost, commuters paid a 35-cent toll in each direction until June 22, 1979. The tollbooths were removed and the plaza space was converted into a flyer stop for Metro Transit buses.

The bridge affected many communities on the Eastside. Redmond's population saw a dramatic increase, jumping from less than 1,500 in 1960 to 11,000 in 1970. It was the second floating bridge to cross Lake Washington; the first was the Lake Washington Floating Bridge, built in 1940 as part of U.S. Route 10, later part of Interstate 90, which at its construction was the largest floating structure ever built.

On November 4, 1972, two people drowned after their boat drifted and collided with the bridge's windward side during a winter storm. The remaining four people on the boat were later rescued. The incident prompted the Department of Highways to install 88 safety ladders along the bridge.

On August 28, 1988, the bridge was officially renamed for governor Albert D. Rosellini; the Washington State Transportation Commission approved of the renaming three days earlier ahead of the bridge's 25th anniversary celebration. At the time, 109,000 vehicles used the bridge on an average day and 529 million vehicles were estimated to have crossed it since it opened.

== Description ==
=== Drawspan opening ===
The bridge was built with a drawspan in the center that could open for boats too tall to go under the bridge. The drawspan opened by raising two 100-foot-long (30 m) steel grids about 7 feet (2.1 m) and moving an adjacent pontoon beneath them.

In 1989, an electrical fault caused the drawspan to open during rush hour, causing one death and five injuries. In 2000, a gravel barge struck the bridge.

== Replacement bridge ==
Just five years after the bridge opened, a study commissioned by the state legislature was completed to figure out how to provide for the great demand for cross-lake transportation. That study evaluated bridge and tunnel crossings north and south of the bridge. Other plans considered in the late 1980s proposed the addition of rail transit or bus lanes to add capacity. To prepare a case for the state legislature, the Trans-Lake Study was commissioned to study various alternatives. The study brought together 47 representatives of public agencies, neighborhoods, businesses, and advocacy interests.

In 1997, Myint Lwin, WSDOT's chief bridge engineer, said that even with repairs, the bridge could be expected to last only about twenty more years (until 2017). The bridge needed to be closed to traffic in high winds, and even after a seismic retrofit in 1999, it was at risk of collapse during an earthquake. Due to the weight of various reinforcements over the years, the bridge deck ultimately sat about 1 foot (30 cm) lower over the water than it did originally.

Since the bridge was built in the early 1960s, prior to the implementation of modern earthquake standards, its hollow support structures would have likely failed during a major earthquake. Additionally, vibrations induced by storm surges and strong winds could have compromised the drawspan, anchor cables, and pontoons, subjecting them to structural failure. Even for storms below the maximum threshold for failure to occur, Washington State Department of Transportation (WSDOT) still closed the floating bridge to traffic. The original bridge carried two lanes of traffic in each direction, but did not include emergency shoulders or pedestrian and bicycle crossings. This posed traffic problems since any obstruction caused by car breakdown, wreck or maintenance would result in traffic backups.

In 2011, WSDOT broke ground on the replacement bridge. On April 2, 2016, WSDOT held a grand opening ceremony, allowing the public to explore the top deck of the new bridge on the westbound side. The replacement bridge opened to westbound traffic on April 11, 2016, and opened to eastbound traffic on April 25, 2016. The old bridge was permanently closed at 23:00 PDT on April 22, 2016, with demolition completed by the end of 2016. The bridge was removed by spring 2017.

=== Construction ===
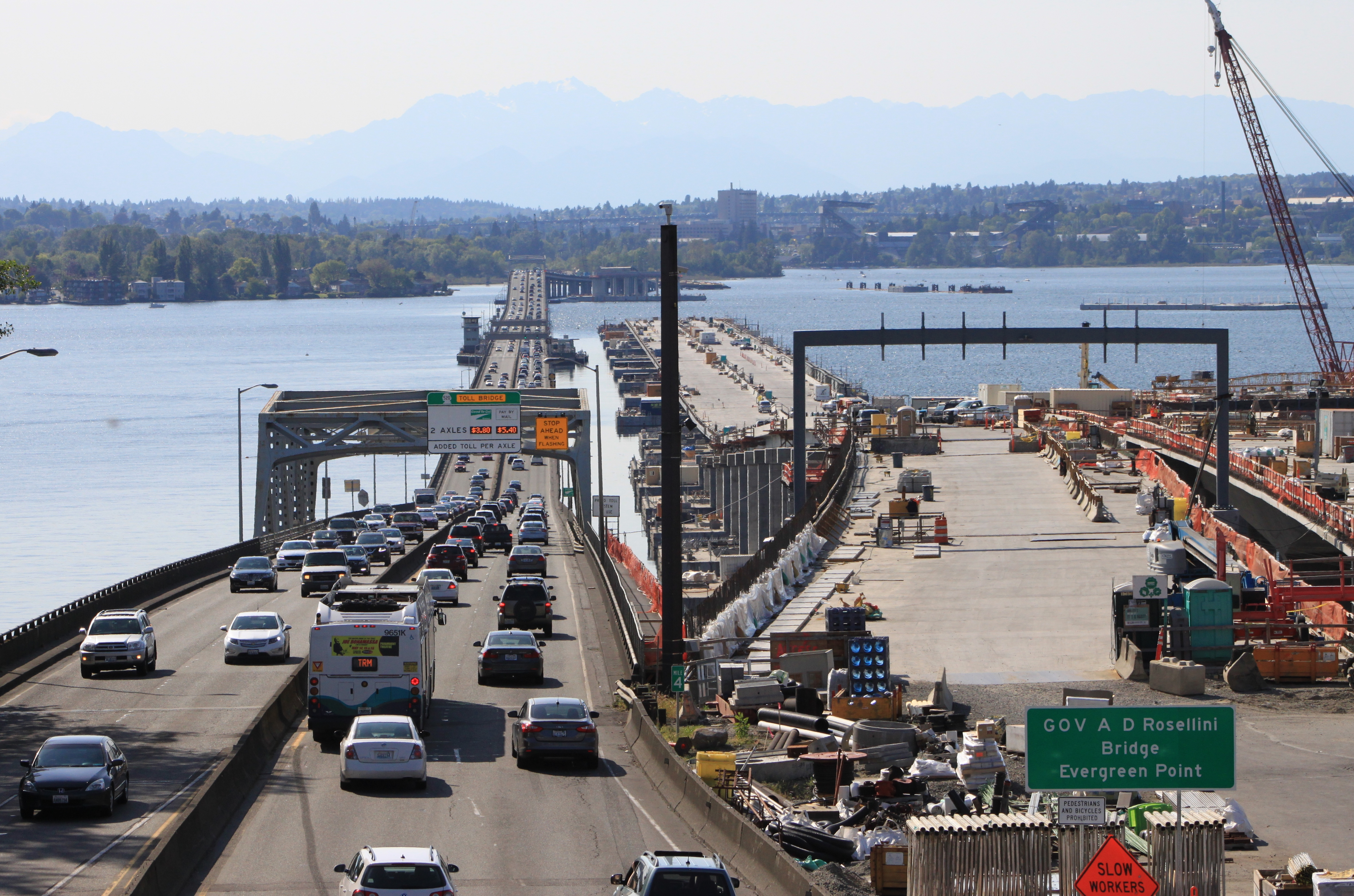
Replacement bridge, to the north of the Rosellini Bridge, under construction in May 2015

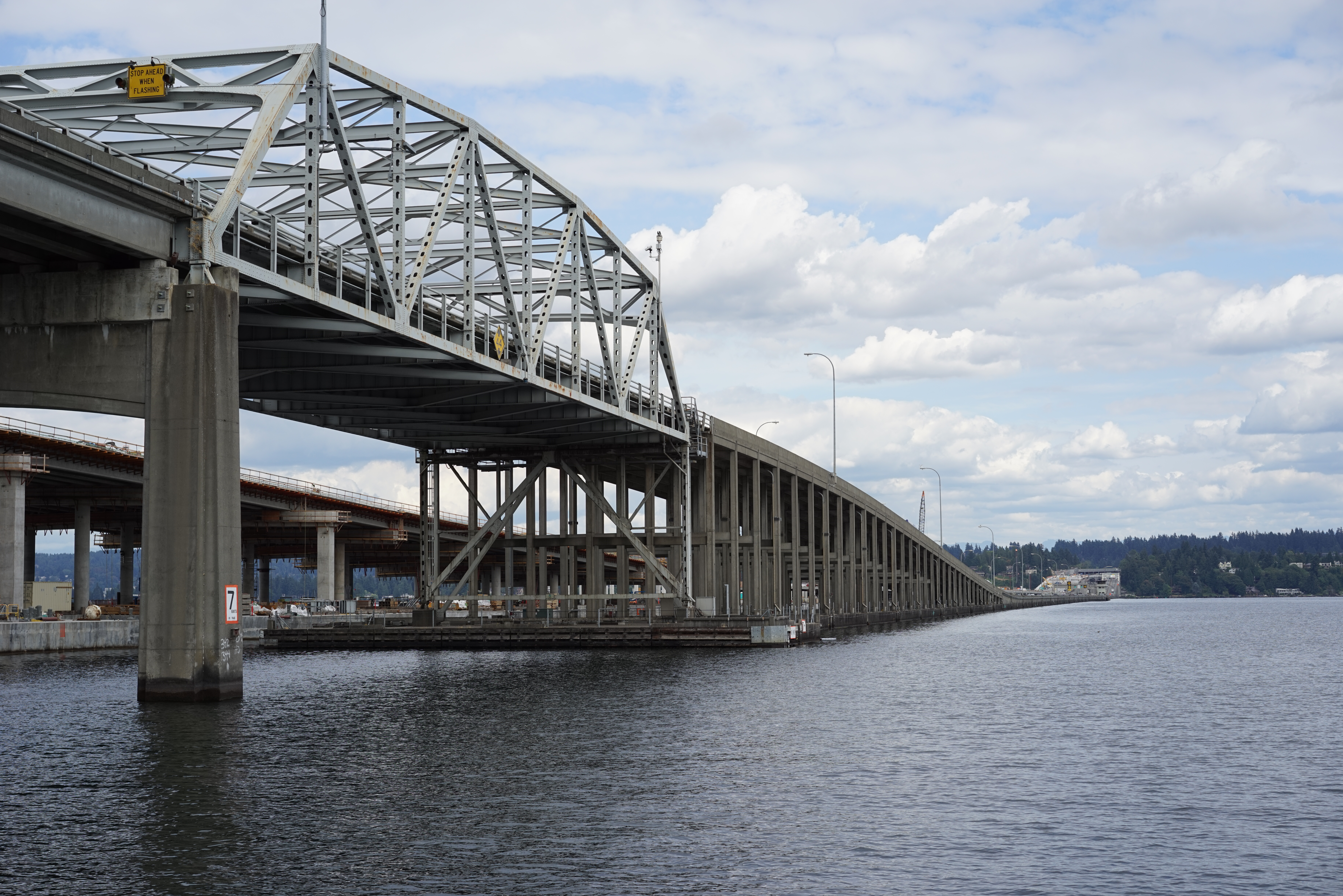
Photo of the south side of the bridge in 2015, with construction visible in the background.

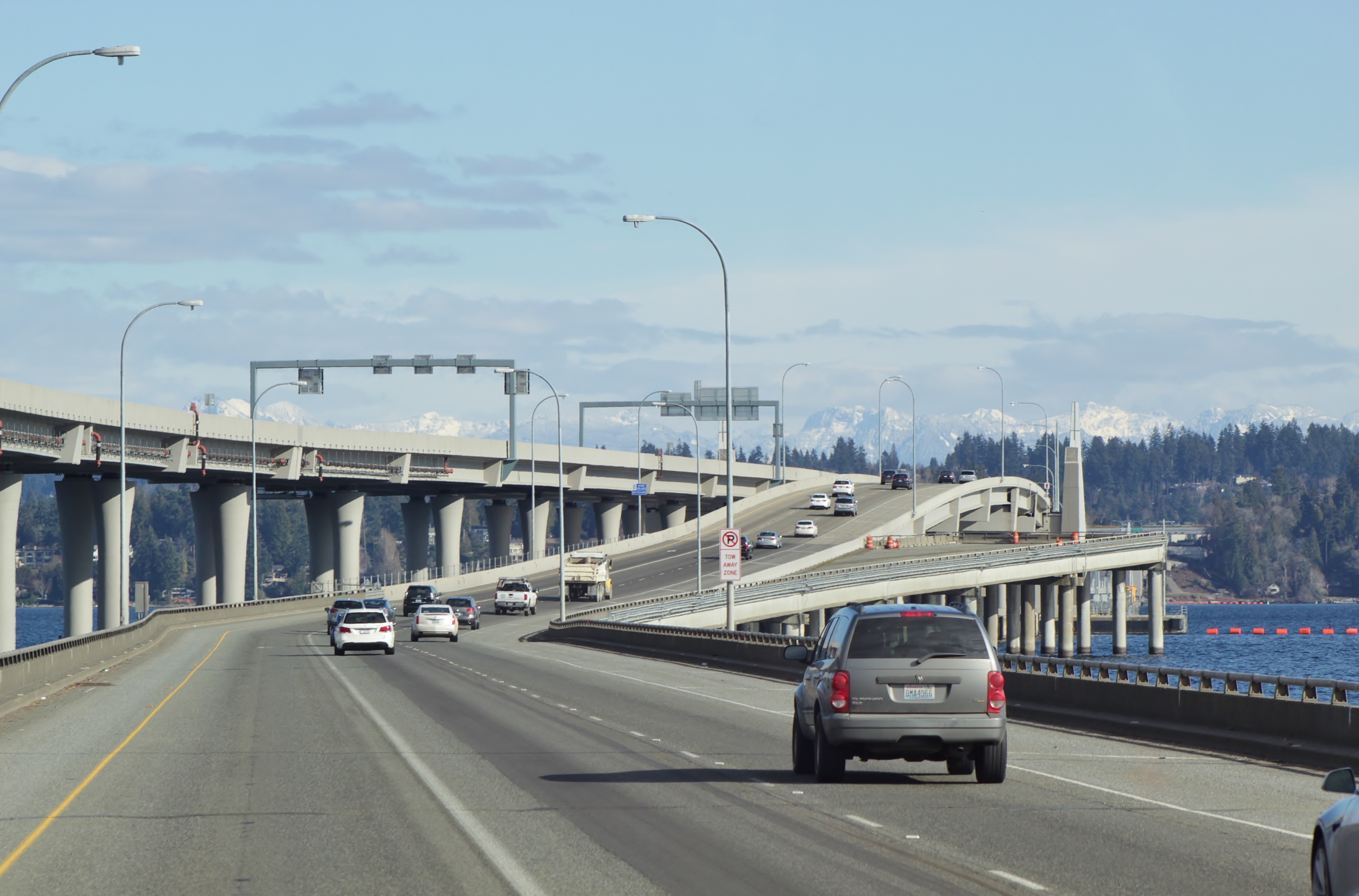
The new Evergreen Point Floating Bridge, which opened in 2016 and initially reused the west approach of the old bridge

The cost of all improvements to SR-520 between I-5 and I-405, including the new bridge, is forecast to be $4.65 billion.

The first of 21 longitudinal pontoons were positioned on August 11, 2012. Each pontoon is 360 feet (110 m) long and 75 feet (23 m) wide. The pontoons were constructed in Aberdeen by Kiewit Construction. Pontoon construction was plagued by errors and shoddy construction. Reports included workers installing incorrectly sized rebar, installing it in the wrong location, and even having it missing altogether. Workers also poured concrete in weather that was too wet or too cold. Several of the new pontoons have had problems with cracking, which has been blamed on Kiewit's poor work. An independent auditor stated that there had been a long-running pattern of poor-quality work and that WSDOT failed to force Kiewit to take corrective actions. An inspector for the construction called it a disaster waiting to happen, adding "I won't drive across that bridge when they have it built."

By the end of February 2015, enough of the new bridge was in place to block tall ships that used to pass through a drawspan in the Rosellini Bridge. In early July 2015, the westernmost floating pontoon was moved to make room for the installation of the west end of the bridge; on July 8, 2015, all longitudinal pontoons for the new bridge were in place.

== Tolling ==
When the bridge opened in 1963, a 35 cent toll was collected to pay off a construction bond. The sole toll plaza was located at the east end of the bridge in Medina and had nine booths. The state government offered discounts to commuters using a ticket book, as well as carpools of two or more people. The toll was retired on June 22, 1979, after the $35 million bond had been paid off 20 years ahead of schedule. More than 213 million vehicles had used the toll bridge and generated $59.6 million in revenue. One of the former tollbooths was reused for a drive-through espresso stand in Juanita.

Tolls were reinstated on December 29, 2011, to fund the original bridge's replacement. They were automatically collected using cameras and sensors that detected license plates or the state's "Good to Go" passes. Toll readers were located on gantries at the east highrise, but additional gantries on the east mainland were added to facilitate tolling on the new bridge once opened. The toll was initially set at a maximum of $3.50 for Good to Go users during peak hours and was not charged during the overnight hours.

On the first day of tolling, there was a 60 percent reduction in vehicles using the Evergreen Point Floating Bridge compared to the previous year and a slight increase on Interstate 90. Within the first year, traffic levels declined by 30 percent and tolls generated $50 million in gross revenue. ESHB 2211, which authorized tolling on the SR 520 bridge beginning in 2010 to fund the new bridge, was signed into law in May 2009 by governor Christine Gregoire. The State Transportation Commission has proposed a toll of US$3.59 each way during peak periods. The proposed rates during other hours were to range from $0 to $2.87.

Tim Eyman promoted Initiative 1125, which among other measures, would have banned the time-of-day tolling proposed for the bridge, required funding to be used on the road that collected the toll, and required tolls to be set by elected officials. The initiative was defeated by Washington voters.

== See also ==
- List of bridges documented by the Historic American Engineering Record in Washington (state)
