= Gold Coast (Washington) =

Area near Seattle

Coordinates: 47°37′41″N 122°13′21″W

The Gold Coast is an affluent area in Seattle's Eastside suburbs. It includes Clyde Hill, Medina, Yarrow Point and Hunts Point. Each of these municipalities ranked in Business Week's 2010 list of most expensive small towns in America. Sometimes Beaux Arts Village is also included with the Gold Coast.

== History ==
Medina has been known as the Gold Coast since the 1890s. The first mansion was built at Yarrow Point in 1888, and by the 1920s the area had several mansions belonging to the wealthy.

== Role in national politics ==
Politicians who visit the Seattle area often at least make a stop on the Gold Coast for fundraising, and often bypass Seattle. During the 2024 United States presidential election cycle, Medina was visited by President Biden (then a candidate) for a fundraiser in May, and by Kamala Harris in June; and Democratic nominee for vice president Tim Walz attended a Hunts Point fundraiser in October. None of the candidates in 2024 spoke to the larger public.

== Seattle's gold coast ==
Areas of Seattle's Madison Park, a swath of often extremely expensive homes with lake views, are also called "Gold Coast".

== Notable residents ==
Several billionaires reside in Gold Coast cities, including:

- Steve Ballmer (Hunts Point)
- Jeff Bezos (Medina)
- Bill Gates (Medina) (see also Bill Gates's house)
