= Evergreen Point =

Evergreen Point, Washington
- cape
- Location of Evergreen Point
- Coordinates: 47°38′43″N 122°14′24″W
- Country: United States
- State: Washington
- County: King
- City: Medina
- Elevation: 16 ft (5 m)
- Time zone: UTC-8 (Pacific (PST))
  - Summer (DST): UTC-7 (PDT)
- ZIP code: 98039
- Area code: 425
- GNIS feature ID: 1510421

Evergreen Point is the westernmost of a group of three small peninsulas on the east side of Lake Washington, King County, Washington. It is situated between the main body of the lake and Fairweather Bay. Most notable for being the namesake of the Evergreen Point Floating Bridge, it is part of the city of Medina.

== See also ==
- Hunts Point
- Yarrow Point
