= Bellevue School District =

School district in Washington, United States

Address
- 12111 NE 1st St Bellevue, Washington, 98005; United States

District information
- Type: Public
- Grades: Pre-K through High school
- Established: 1942; 84 years ago
- Superintendent: Dr. Kelly Aramaki
- NCES District ID: 5300390

Students and staff
- Students: 19,510 (2021-2022)
- Teachers: 1035.69
- Staff: 1579.72
- Student–teacher ratio: 18.84

Other information
- Website: www.bsd405.org

Location of Bellevue in King County, Washington (not co-terminous with the district boundaries)

Location of Washington within the United States

Bellevue School District No. 405 (BSD) is a public school district in King County, headquartered in Bellevue. As of October 1, 2016, the district has an enrollment of 19,974 students.

The Bellevue School District includes 28 schools: 15 elementary schools, 1 Spanish immersion elementary school, 1 Chinese immersion elementary school, 5 regular middle schools, 4 regular high schools, and two district-wide choice schools (grades 6–12). The district has a staff of about 2,900 employees, including about 1,500 teachers.

In 2013, Newsweek magazine named Bellevue, Interlake, International, Newport and Sammamish to its list of "America's Best High Schools". In 2013, The Washington Post placed Bellevue, Interlake, International, Newport and Sammamish on its list of "America's Most Challenging High Schools". In 2013, U.S. News & World Report ranked Bellevue, Interlake, International and Newport among its "Best High Schools".

== Boundary ==
It includes the majority of Bellevue. Additionally it includes Beaux Arts Village, Clyde Hill, Hunts Point, Medina, and Yarrow Point. It also has a portion of Redmond and a very small portion of Kirkland.

== Demographics ==
As of October 2020, there were 19,545 students enrolled in the district. 100 languages are spoken in the district, with 42.5% of students speaking a first language other than English. 17.2% of students receive MLL (Multi-Language Learner) Services. 19.0% of students qualify for free or reduced lunch. The racial demographics of the district are: 3.8% Black/African American, 43.9% Asian, 14.2% Hispanic, 10.1% Multi-Ethnic, 0.2% Native American/American Indian/Alaska Native, 0.3% Native Hawaiian/Pacific Islander, and 27.0% White.

By February 2015 the district experienced an influx of highly educated immigrant families from East Asia and South Asia who selected the district due to its reputation for strong academics and testimonials from foreign sources. The district's number of Indian language-speaking students was 185 in 2004. As of 2015 the district had about 1,600 students who spoke Mandarin Chinese, Cantonese, and/or Taiwanese Min-Nan; and the district also had over 800 speakers of Indian languages. The speakers of Chinese had increased by 91% in a ten-year span beginning around 2004, and speakers of Indian languages had increased around 400% during the same period.

== Schools ==
Students attend elementary (primary) school from kindergarten to fifth grade, middle school from sixth to eighth grade, and high school from ninth to twelfth grade. Each of the school, except Choice schools, have a defined geographic attendance area. Students are assigned to a school based on the attendance area in which they reside. With three exceptions, these schools are located in the city of Bellevue. Clyde Hill Elementary and Chinook Middle School are located in the city of Clyde Hill.

=== High schools (grades 9–12) ===
- Bellevue High School
- Interlake High School
- Newport High School
- Sammamish High School

=== Middle schools (grades 6–8) ===
- Chinook Middle School
- Highland Middle School
- Odle Middle School
- Tillicum Middle School
- Tyee Middle School

=== Elementary schools (Pre-K to 5th grade) ===
- Ardmore Elementary School
- Bennett Elementary School
- Cherry Crest Elementary School
- Clyde Hill Elementary School
- Enatai Elementary School
- Lake Hills Elementary School
- Medina Elementary School
- Newport Heights Elementary School
- Phantom Lake Elementary School
- Sherwood Forest Elementary School
- Somerset Elementary School
- Spiritridge Elementary School
- Stevenson Elementary School
- Woodridge Elementary School

=== Choice schools ===
- Bellevue Big Picture School (6–12)
- International School (6–12)
- Puesta del Sol Elementary School (K-5 Spanish immersion)
- Jing Mei Elementary School (K-5 Chinese immersion)
- Bellevue Digital Discovery (K-12 All Online)

=== Former schools ===
Over the years, the district closed several schools. In many cases, declining enrollment after the baby boomers graduated led to closure. The district leased some schools to private schools or non-profit organizations. Some properties were transferred to other local governments.

- Ashwood Elementary School is the Bellevue Regional Library and two sports fields.
- Eastgate Elementary School was closed in 2023 and the Big Picture School moved into its facilities in 2026.
- Ivanhoe Elementary School is a performing arts center and public park. Ivanhoe Elementary School opened in 1962 and closed in 1981.
- Kelsey Creek Home School Center (1–12) closed in June 2012.
- Lake Heights Elementary School became a YMCA location. In 2008, it traded sites with Newport Heights Elementary.
- Ringdall Junior High School was Eastside Catholic School and is now used as a temporary location for schools whose regular buildings are under construction. Ringdall was also the temporary home of Cougar Mountain Middle School of the Issaquah School District during the 2021-2022 school year.
- Robinswood Middle School and Robinswood High School were closed and the Big Picture School moved into its facilities in 2011 until it moved again in 2026.
- Surrey Downs School is now a local park for the neighborhood as of 2020.
- Three Points Elementary School, located in Medina, is now an elementary school for Bellevue Christian Schools.
- Union S High School is now Bellevue Downtown Park. It was once known as Overlake High School.
- Wilburton Elementary School's original 1963 site closed in 1983 and is now the district's Wilburton Instructional Service Center. Its later 2018 site closed in 2023, after which Jing Mei Elementary School moved into its facilities.

== 2008 strike ==
On June 10, 2008, Bellevue teachers voted almost unanimously to go on strike if a new contract could not be reached by the end of the summer. On the evening of September 1, the day before classes would have started, the Bellevue Education Association (BEA) announced the beginning of the strike. On September 14, BEA members agreed to the tentative agreement that school was to begin on September 15. The dispute between the BEA and BSD had three main issues: compensation; benefits; and use of the Curriculum Web, a strictly enforced curriculum for all teachers to follow.

== 2023 Consolidation Request ==
In 2023, the Bellevue School Board considered merging 3 schools; Ardmore, Wilburton and Eastgate into other schools following low fertility rates and lack of students. The request was to move students from Ardmore to Bennett, Cherry Crest and Sherwood Elementary, move students from Eastgate to Spiritridge and Somerset Elementary, and moving the Spiritridge AL program to Woodridge, and finally moving Wilburton students to Clyde Hill and Enatai Elementary. The Board rejected the Ardmore request but finally accepted the Eastgate and Wilburton request. The move was scheduled for the 2023–2024 school year.

== Honors ==
President Barack Obama visited Medina Elementary School on February 17, 2012. He spent 10 minutes at the school, greeting about 450 students with hand shakes and high fives.

== Legal Issues ==
In March 1967, the school district acquired 30 acres of private land through condemnation and eminent domain action. The land owners sued and lost.

In 2008, the school district was involved in a truancy action in which the student had no representation at their initial hearing. The processes proceeded without representation which drew the attention of the ACLU and the Juvenile Law Center and went to the Supreme Court of Washington State.

In 2024, Robert Scroggs, formerly a special-education teacher in the district, was arrested for multiple counts of child molestation.

A student who was the victim of bullying at school in 2022 filed a lawsuit against the district for its failure to act against the bully, who was his ex-girlfriend.
