= Dean Hachamovitch =

American businessman and manager

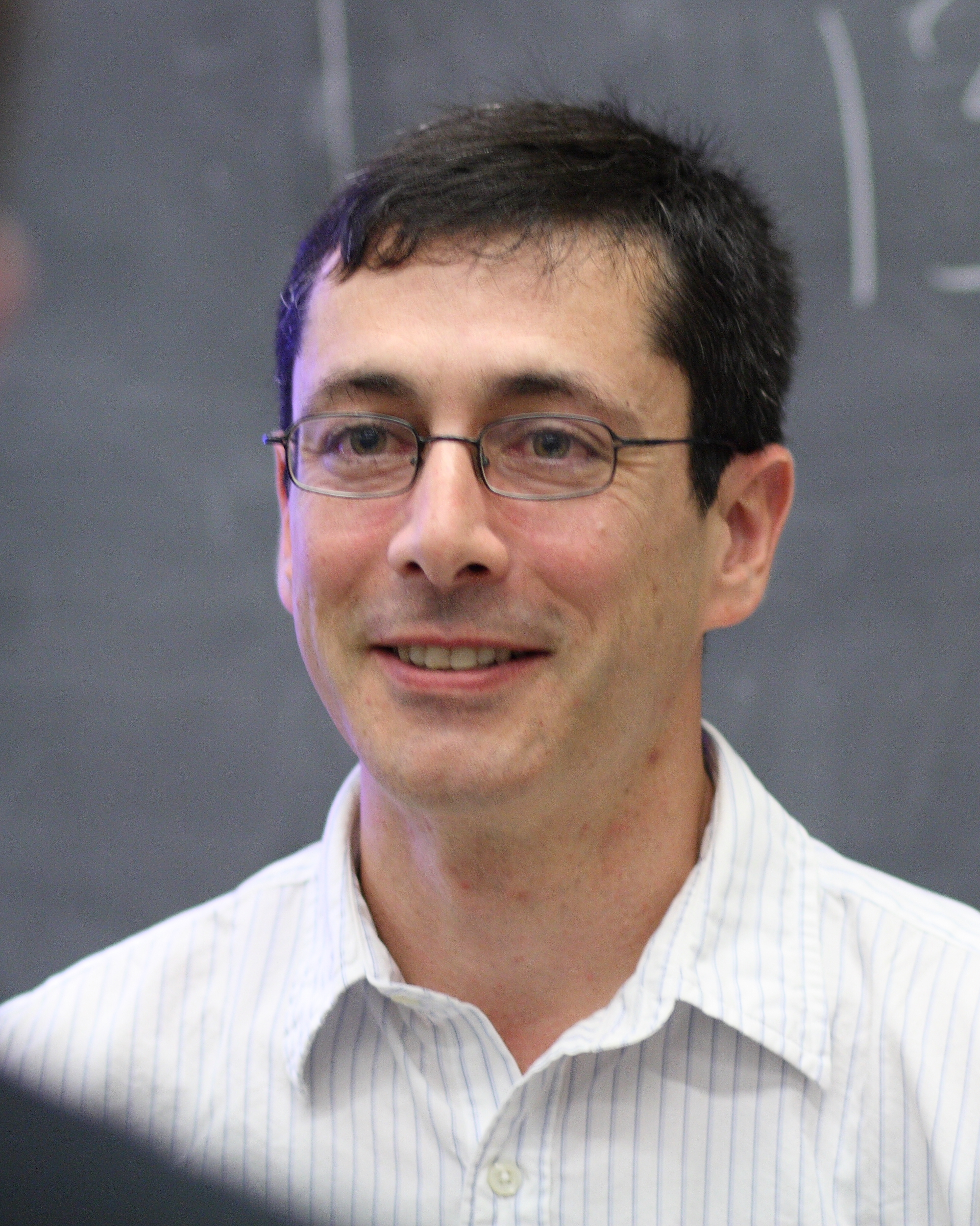
- Hachamovitch after a talk at Yale University in 2008
- Born: New York City, United States
- Education: Harvard University (BA)
- Occupation: Corporate Vice President
- Employer: Microsoft
- Spouse: Joan Morse (1993–present)
- Parent(s): Moshe Hachamovitch; Shoshana Hachamovitch
- Website: Internet Explorer weblog

Dean Jacob Hachamovitch (/həˈkɑːmoʊvɪtʃ/) is a former corporate vice president in charge of the Internet Explorer team at Microsoft.

As of December 2025, he was appointed the mayor of Clyde Hill, Washington by the City Council, having previously been a City Councillor.

== Early life and education ==
Dean Hachamovitch was born to Shoshana and Dr. Moshe Hachamovitch in New York City. His mother was an office manager at Alpha Surgical Enterprises, while his father was an obstetrician and gynaecologist and an assistant professor at Albert Einstein College of Medicine.

Dean Hachamovitch holds a Bachelor of Arts in mathematics from Harvard University.

== Career ==
Hachamovitch joined Microsoft after graduating from Harvard in 1990. He has worked as a product unit manager for Zone.com, part of Microsoft's online gaming branch. He had also worked on Microsoft Office, developing the first version of Microsoft Word's AutoCorrect feature. Later, he became the general manager of the Internet Explorer Team. During his time on the IE team, he was promoted to corporate vice president before later leaving for an unspecified new role at Microsoft in November 2013.

During his career at Microsoft, Hachamovitch has been involved in the invention of several technologies which were subsequently patented by Microsoft, including AutoComplete, AutoCorrect and progress animation.

== Personal life ==
Dean Hachamovitch married Joan Morse in October 1993, when they both worked at Microsoft. The couple has three children.
