= King County Library System =

Public library in Washington state, U.S.

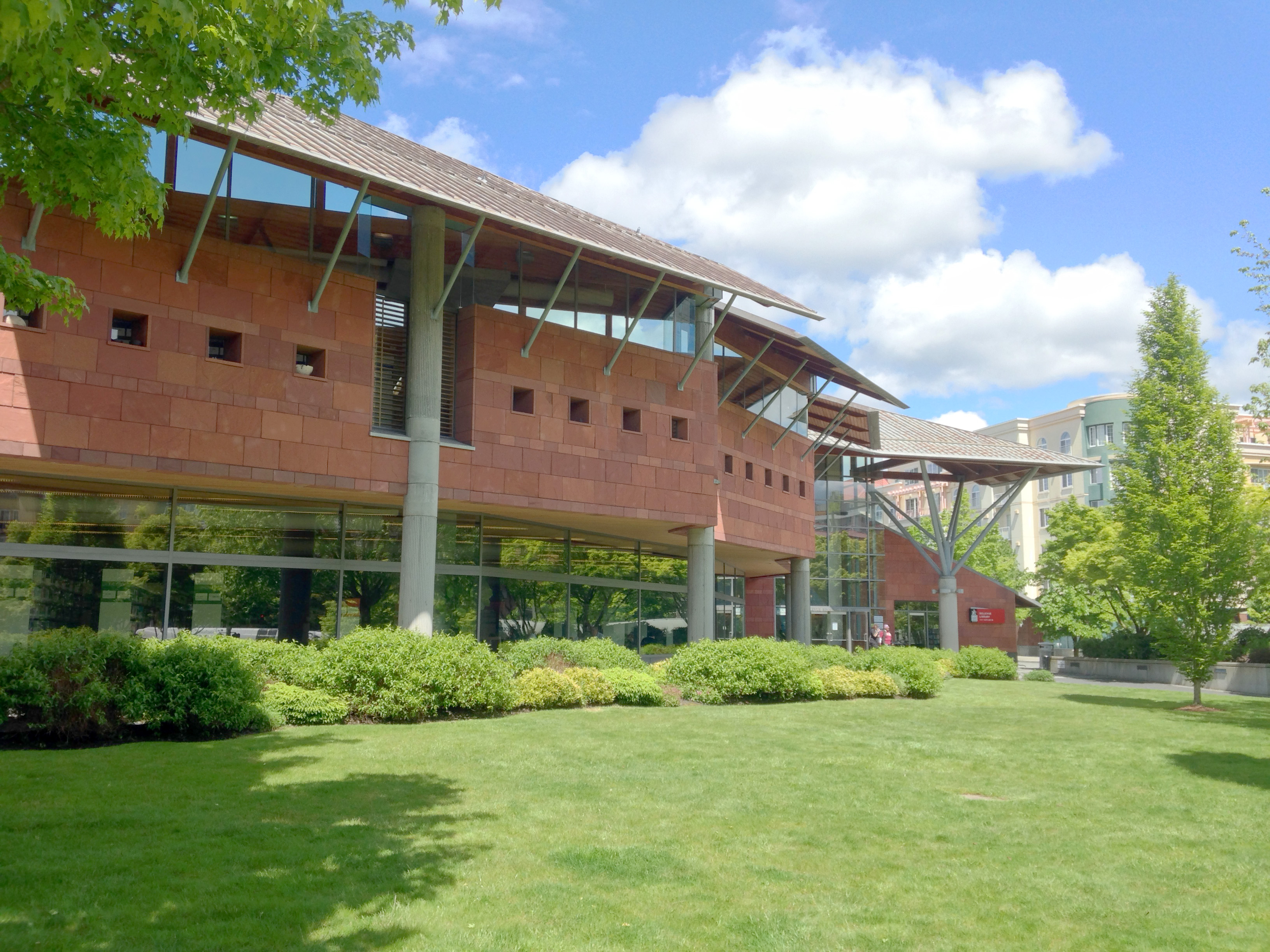
- Bellevue Regional Library, the largest library in the system
- Location: King County, Washington, U.S.
- Type: Public library
- Established: 1942
- Branches: 49

Collection
- Size: 3.7 million items

Access and use
- Access requirements: Residence in King County except the city of Seattle and the towns of Hunts Point and Yarrow Point
- Circulation: 21.5 million
- Population served: 1.6 million
- Members: 630,566

Other information
- Budget: $164.6 million (2025)
- Director: Heidi Daniel
- Employees: 842
- Website: kcls.org
- References: Washington Public Library Statistical Report, 2023

The King County Rural Library District, doing business as the King County Library System (KCLS), is a public library system serving King County, Washington, United States. It has 49 locations in the areas of the county around Seattle, which has a separate city library system. KCLS is headquartered in Issaquah, Washington, and was the busiest library system in the United States in 2010 with a circulation of 22.4 million items. As of 2023, the library system serves a population of 1.6 million residents and has 3.7 million items in its collection, which includes books, periodicals, audio and videotapes, films, disc media, and online resources.

== History ==
The library system began in 1942 when voters in King County established the King County Rural Library District in order to provide library services to people in rural areas with no easy access to city libraries. Funding for the library system is provided from property taxes. Funding measures for the system passed in 1966, 1977, 1980, 1988, 2002, 2004, and 2010. Property taxes account for 94% of revenue today. The name of the organization was changed from the King County Rural Library District to the present-day King County Library System in 1978, although the previous name of "Rural Library District" is still part of the organization's legal name. The system received a $172 million capital bond in 2004 to rebuild, renovate, and expand most of its existing libraries, as well as building new libraries.

KCLS extends access privileges to residents of its service area, which includes all unincorporated areas of King County as well as residents of every city in the county except Hunts Point and Yarrow Point, which do not offer any library service at all. Residents of Seattle—which maintains its own library system—are allowed access to KCLS collections under reciprocal borrowing agreements between KCLS and Seattle's libraries. KCLS also extends reciprocal borrowing privileges to residents of many other library systems in Western and North Central Washington. KCLS annexed Renton's public library system in 2010 following a vote by the city's residents.

In 2011, KCLS won the Gale/Library Journal "Library of the Year" award. The library eliminated its late fines in 2023 after finding it discouraged borrowing and cost more to collect and process. Replacement fees were instead levied for lost items.

== Facilities ==
KCLS consists of 49 branches, one standalone book locker, the Traveling Library Center, ABC Express Vans, a mobile TechLab, and 11 bookmobiles. A service center located in Issaquah also houses the library's administrative offices. A program to build 17 new libraries and renovate or expand 26 other libraries was completed in 2019 with the opening of the Panther Lake Library in Kent. The system's Renton sorting facility and warehouse opened in June 2026 and is able to handle up to 8,000 items per hour.

=== Branches ===
Map of KCLS branches

List of King County Library System locations
Image	Branch Name	Square Footage
More images	Algona-Pacific Library	5,250
More images	Auburn Library	20,000
More images	Bellevue Regional Library (largest)	80,000
	Black Diamond Library	5,000
More images	Bothell Regional Library	22,500
	Boulevard Park Library	6,536
	Burien Library	32,000
	Carnation Library	5,000
	Covington Library	23,000
	Des Moines Library	10,320
	Duvall Library	8,000
	Fairwood Library	10,541
More images	Enumclaw Library	20,000
	Fall City Library	5,000
More images	Federal Way Regional Library	34,500
More images	Federal Way 320th Library	15,000
	Greenbridge Library (White Center)	2,300
More images	Issaquah Library	15,000
	Kenmore Library	10,000
More images	Kent Regional Library	22,600
	Kent Panther Lake Library	5,000
	Kingsgate Library (Kirkland)	10,235
	Kirkland Library	19,500
	Lake Forest Park Library	5,840
	Lake Hills Library (Bellevue)	10,000
	Library Connection at Crossroads (Bellevue)	3,740
	Library Connection at Southcenter (Tukwila)	5,085
	Library Express at Redmond Ridge (Redmond)	300
	Maple Valley Library	10,000
	Mercer Island Library	14,886
	Muckleshoot Library	6,000
	Newcastle Library	11,000
	Newport Way Library (Bellevue)	8,690
	North Bend Library	9,600
	Redmond Regional Library	30,000
More images	Renton Public Library	19,500
	Renton Highlands Library	15,000
	Richmond Beach Library (Shoreline)	5,250
	Sammamish Library	19,500
	Shoreline Library	20,954
	Skykomish Library	1,042
	Skyway Library	8,000
	Snoqualmie Library	6,000
	Tukwila Library	10,000
	Valley View Library (SeaTac)	6,558
	Vashon Library	10,000
	White Center Library	10,000
	Woodinville Library	15,000
	Woodmont Library (Des Moines)	9,850

=== Mobile services ===
- ABC Express
- Traveling Library Center
- Techlab
- Library2Go

== Services ==
In 2016, KCLS circulated 20.8 million items, the third-most in the United States. The KCLS budget for 2025 is $164.4 million.

KCLS is subscribed to OverDrive, an online service that offers digital e-book, audiobook, and magazine checkouts for library patrons. In 2023, the library system had 8.8 million digital checkouts—the third most of any system in OverDrive worldwide.
