= Bellevue High School (Bellevue, Washington) =

American public high school

Location
- 10416 Wolverine Way; Bellevue, Washington 98004; United States; 47°36′15″N 122°11′56″W

Information
- Type: Public secondary school
- Established: 1923
- Principal: Victor Anderson
- Teaching staff: 74.65 (FTE)
- Enrollment: 1,634 (2023–2024)
- Student to teacher ratio: 21.89
- Colors: Blue and gold
- Mascot: Wolverine
- Rival: Mercer Island High School, Newport High School
- Website: Bellevue H.S.

Bellevue High School is a public secondary school located in Bellevue, Washington. Bellevue has 1632 students enrolled in grades 9 through 12.

The school principal is Dr. Victor J. Anderson. The school's mascot is the wolverine.

Bellevue High School generally serves students in Bellevue School District's West Zone, which includes the towns of Medina, Yarrow Point, Clyde Hill, Hunts Point and Beaux Arts, and the neighborhoods of Enatai, Woodridge, Wilburton and Downtown Bellevue.

== History ==
Bellevue High School's history can be traced back to 1923, when it first became an accredited four-year high school. Classes were held in a two-room school built in 1892 at the southeast corner of 100th Avenue and Main Street. It was at this location that The Beacon (the school annual) and The Barque (the student newspaper) began publication in 1925 and 1926, respectively.

From 1930 until 1949, the school was located on 102nd Avenue Northeast between Northeast 1st and 4th Streets, a site which is now part of Bellevue Downtown Park. The school was known as Overlake High School during part of this era. Bellevue's award-winning chapter of the Future Farmers of America formed an important part of student and community life until the area's rapid urbanization led to the chapter disbanding in 1950.

The high school moved once again in January 1949 to its current hilltop campus on Kilmarnock Street (renamed "Wolverine Way" as the result of a campaign led by the Class of 2000). The Bellevue Memorial Athletic Field opened on September 15 of the following year, dedicated to "the men and women of the Overlake area, living and dead, who faithfully served their country at home and abroad during World War II." The building underwent four major additions and renovations between 1952 and 1978. By the late 2000s, school officials felt that the heating and lighting systems, the Performing Arts Center, and the building in general were outdated; in June 2010, Bellevue High began a major construction project to address these concerns. Designed by NAC Architecture, the project was a phased addition and modernization to the 1949 school, building new academic classrooms, commons, administration and library before demolishing most of the existing facilities, leaving only the PE and athletic facilities to be modernized. A new performing arts center with music and drama classrooms and new parking lots were built where the existing structures were removed. In order to maintain a sense of continuity and respect for the legacy of the school, the red brick and elements of the original design are reinterpreted in the new building.

== Academics ==
Newsweek magazine has ranked Bellevue High School among the best public and private high schools in the nation since it initiated its ranking of U.S. high schools in 2003 as measured by the number of AP tests taken divided by the number of seniors. The subsequent publicity resulted in the school reaching its building population limit and closing the formerly open enrollment policy. For the 2007–2008 school year, only students living within its zones may newly enroll.

Bellevue High School also has a number of special vocational programs in areas such as automotive technology, as well as a class that is responsible for the KASB radio station.

== Activities ==
The largest extracurricular organization at Bellevue is Key Club, with over 100 members. The chapter is part of Pacific Northwest Division 28, which is the largest division in the Pacific Northwest and has a record of winning the Spirit Award at district conventions.

Many other clubs at the school are noteworthy, such as the DECA Team which has won Nationals three times and the school's dedicated FIRST Robotics Competition Team which has won the district competition in 2008. Bellevue high school also has a chess team, who won the 2018 WA State High School Team Chess Championship. The school also has a chapter of the Japanese National Honor Society, which inducted its first members in 2019. A campus tradition is Soup 4 Simpson, a charity event that happens every year to donate money to homeless shelters.

The Bellevue High School Band program has also received national recognition. The 2016-2017 jazz band was selected as finalists for the Swing Central Jazz Festival in Savannah, Georgia, where twelve of the nation’s top bands are invited. They have also been selected for the Hot Java Cool Jazz Concert, which features live sets by award-winning jazz bands from five local high schools.

== Athletics ==
Bellevue has 20 varsity teams and 45 other teams that provide a range of team and individual sports. The school has won state titles in multiple individual and team sports including boys and girls cross country, lacrosse, tennis, soccer, swimming, water polo, track, wrestling, and football, as well as several team academic championships. Of particular note is Bellevue's Girls swim and dive team whose 2007 3A Championship represents its sixth in seven years, and seventh in nine years.

BHS Girls Soccer won: 3A KingCo League Champions 2013, 2014, 2015, 2016, 2021, 2022, 2023

3A State Tournament 2013, 2014, 2015, 2016, 2017, 2019, 2021, 2022, 2023

3A Final Four 2013, 2014, 2016, 2017, 2019, 2022

3A State Champions: 2016 and 2022

Bellevue's football team has gained significant attention, winning the Washington State 3A championship 11 times between 2001 and 2013. Under the coaching of Butch Goncharoff, Although there have been multiple calls to move the school to Class 4A, the school has refused. The team has become nationally recognized according to USAToday for its precision use of the Wing T offense.

The Bellevue football team's 67 game win streak ended in with a 35-13 defeat by Eastside Catholic in the 2014 Class 3A state championship game.

The 2004 Bellevue team finished the season ranked No. 8 in the nation by USA Today and ended De La Salle High School's record 151 game winning streak. The 2004 team went on to win their fourth consecutive state title, a Washington State record for large schools, and completing a 51 win, 2 loss span, led by Washington State Player of the Year J.R. Hasty as well as first team all-state players E.J. Savannah, Stephen Schilling, Connor Mawhinney, and Keith Rosenburg. Other Bellevue players to receive Associated Press First Team all-state honors during the 4 consecutive title streak include Gavin Smith, Pat Mutzel, Jay Johnson, Jeff Dicks, Matt Coombs, Mike Braund, and Lee Driftmier.

Bellevue's 2008 state 3A football championship was the school's sixth state championship in eight years and seventh state football championship in school history. Prior to winning the 2008 state championship, the Bellevue football team was involved in a rollover bus crash several hours prior to playing the Capital Cougars (Olympia, WA) in the state semi-finals in the Tacoma Dome. The accident delayed the game for three days as the Bellevue Wolverines went on to defeat the Cougars in the state semi-finals. Bellevue holds multiple other Washington State records including the record for most consecutive championship tournament wins at 17. The 2009 team went on and had a 12–2 record and again won the WIAA 3A state title. In 2010, the Bellevue Wolverines won the state 3A football championship for a 3rd straight year (and 8 out of the previous 10 years), defeating Kamiakin High School 38–0 in the championship game.

On May 26, 2012, the boys track and field team won the Class 3A state title, winning the 400 and 1600 meter relays en route to a 20-point victory over second place Lakes High School. Bellevue again won the boys track and field state championship in 2013, 2014 and 2015, making it four years in a row.

Bellevue's 2010 lacrosse team beat Mercer Island 8–7 in overtime for the state title.

In 2011, the Bellevue boys water polo team beat the Newport Knights 15-8 to win the team's first ever state championship. In 2012, the Bellevue water polo team won its second consecutive state championship with a 7-3 victory over the Curtis Vikings. In 2013, the Bellevue boys water polo team won its third consecutive state championship with a 12-9 victory over the Mercer Island Islanders. Bellevue boys water polo won a fourth consecutive state championship in 2014.

On June 6, 2016, the football program received a 4-year post-season ban, as well as no nonleague games, no out-of-state opponents, no receiving donations from outside entities. These sanctions were put in place for violations including creating false addresses for athletes to gain eligibility, having boosters pay athletes’ tuition and coaches coordinating payments for athletes.

== Demographics ==
In the 2017-2018 school year, the total student enrollment was 1,497. The racial demographics are: 2% Black/African American, 32% Asian, 6% Hispanic, 10% Multi-Ethnic and 50% White. 27% of students speak another first language besides English. 7% of students receive special education services or 504 Plans. 10% qualify for free or reduced lunches.

== Notable alumni ==
- Jane Adams, actress, 1994 Tony Award winner
- Daryl Anderson, actor
- Budda Baker, safety for the Arizona Cardinals, formerly for Pac-12 champion Washington Huskies
- Kevin Bleyer, Emmy Award-winning television writer
- Ned Brower, actor
- Bill Cahill, football player, Buffalo Bills
- Joshua Caldwell, filmmaker
- David DeCastro, American football guard
- Jennifer Dunn, former U.S. Representative
- Etty Lau Farrell, singer, dancer, Satellite Party, PerryEtty vs. Star of E! series "Married to Rock"
- Marcus Henry, center for the Dallas Cowboys, formerly for Boise State University
- Myles Jack, linebacker
- Taylor Jacobs, producer and host at 710 AM ESPN of Seattle
- Bernie James, soccer player and coach
- Michael Katsuhisa, professional basketball player, coach
- Jeff Moss, founder of Black Hat & DEF CON computer hacker conferences
- Bre Pettis, co-founder and former CEO of MakerBot Industries
- Ann Reinking, dancer, actress, 1997 Tony Award winner
- Roger Robinson, actor, 2009 Tony Award winner
- Stephen Schilling, football player
- Luke Sikma, basketball player
- Jim Taylor, screenwriter, 2004 Academy Award winner
- Cuong Vu, jazz trumpeter
- Anna Wilson, basketball player
- Rufus Yerxa, Deputy Director-General, World Trade Organization
