= Eastside (King County, Washington) =

Suburbs of Seattle located on the east side of Lake Washington

Coordinates: 47°36′N 122°10′W

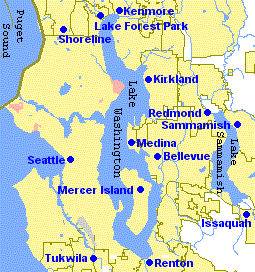
The Eastside is to the right (east) of Seattle.

The Eastside of the King County, Washington area in the United States is a collective term for the suburbs of Seattle located on the east side of Lake Washington.

The most common definitions of the Eastside include the cities of Bellevue, Kirkland, Redmond, Sammamish, Issaquah, Newcastle, and Mercer Island.

The towns west of Bellevue, collectively known as the Gold Coast, are usually considered part of the Eastside. These include Beaux Arts Village, Clyde Hill, Hunts Point, Medina, and Yarrow Point.

The Northshore cities of Kenmore, Bothell, and Woodinville, and the Cottage Lake community, may be considered part of the Eastside, as each contains portions that are east of the lake and south of its northernmost tip. Similarly, on the southeast tip of Lake Washington, Renton may also be included.

The most expansive definitions of the Eastside can include cities in the Snoqualmie Valley, including Duvall, Carnation, Fall City, Snoqualmie, and North Bend.

In politics, the area is sometimes referred to as the "suburban crescent".

== History ==
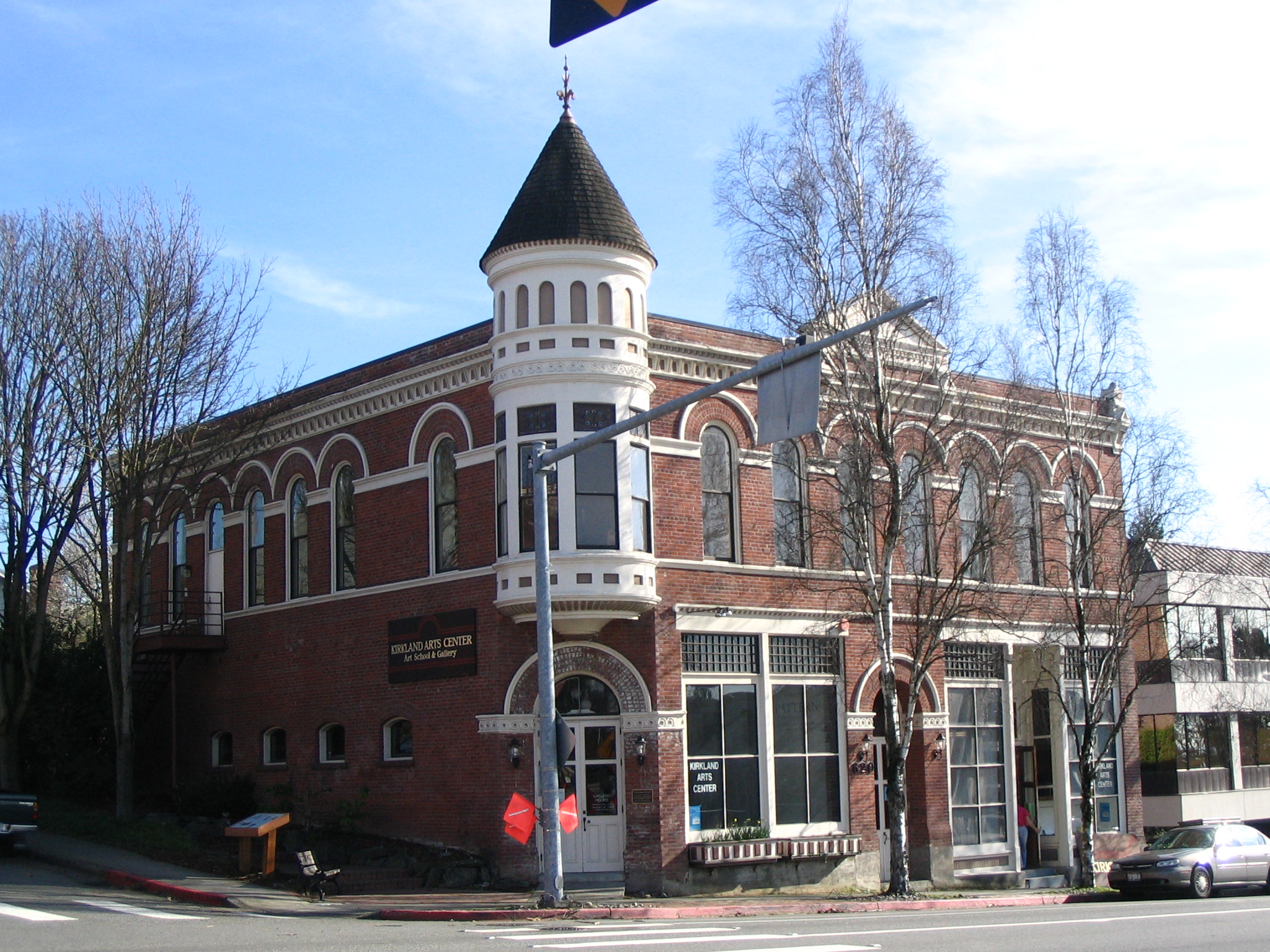
Peter Kirk Building, built 1889–1890 as the Kirkland Investment Company Building. Now Kirkland Arts Center.

Several Indigenous peoples have lived on the Eastside for thousands of years prior to American colonization. The various subgroups of the Hachuamish, as well as the Sammamish, had many villages along the eastern coast of Lake Washington and the Sammamish River. Although they were more contained to the southernmost reaches of the Eastside, the modern-day site of Renton was the center of Duwamish society. Farther out in the Snoqualmie Valley, the Snoqualmie were historically one of the most populous tribes in the Puget Sound region.

The cities on the Eastside mostly began as centers of logging or mining in the late 19th and early 20th centuries. Once logged, the land was eventually cleared (supplemented by some Japanese immigrant labor) to support farming. In the years prior to World War II they became centers of dairy and berry farming.

During the post-war boom, they became bedroom communities for Seattle. This was made possible by the 1940 construction of the Lacey V. Murrow Memorial Bridge across Lake Washington, as well as the later construction of the Evergreen Point Floating Bridge in 1963; additional traffic later led to the construction of an additional bridge paralleling the Murrow bridge, Homer M. Hadley Memorial Bridge, as well as the replacement of the Evergreen Point Floating Bridge. Currently, the area is growing several edge cities.

== Economy ==
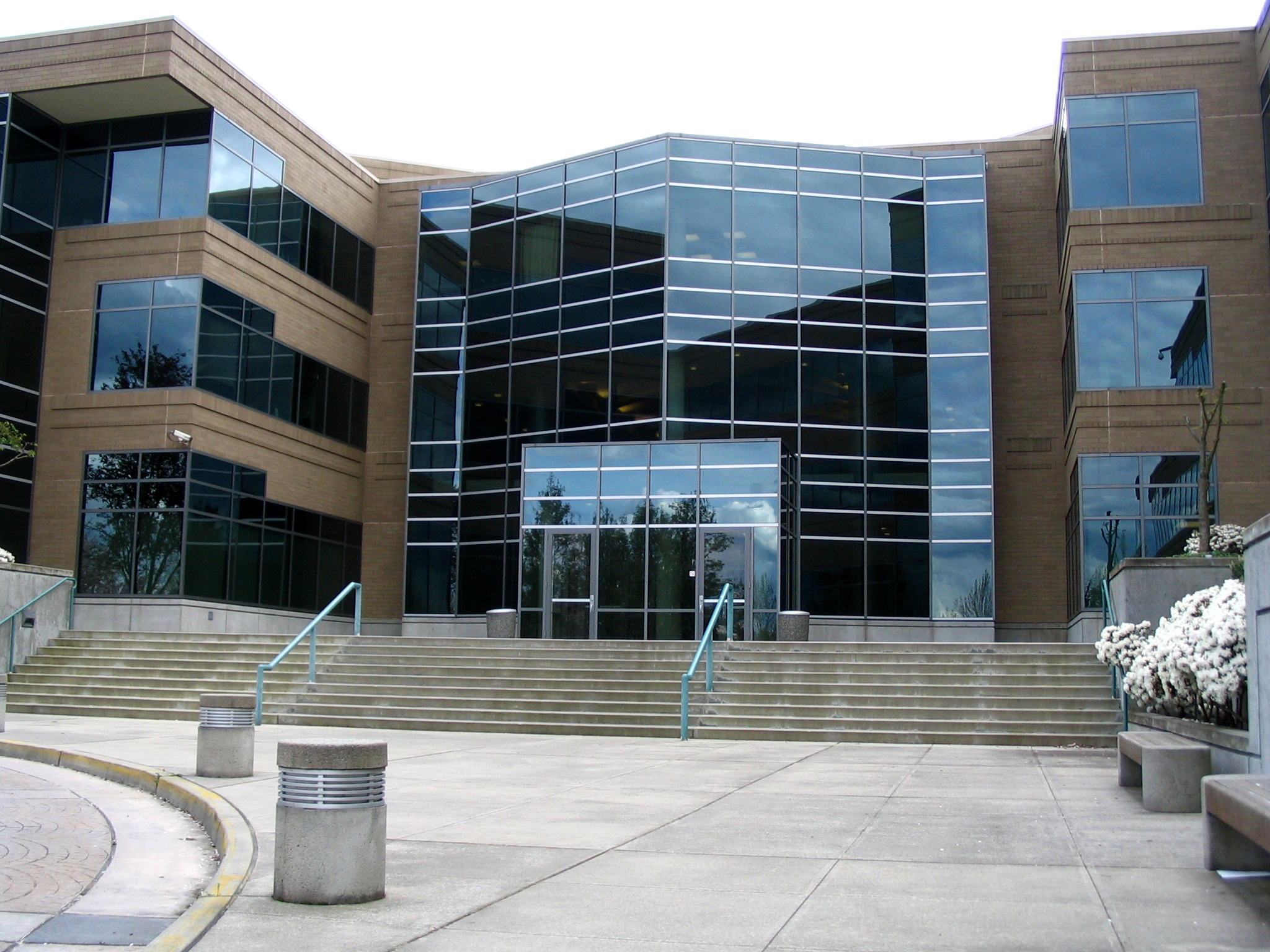
Microsoft Building 17

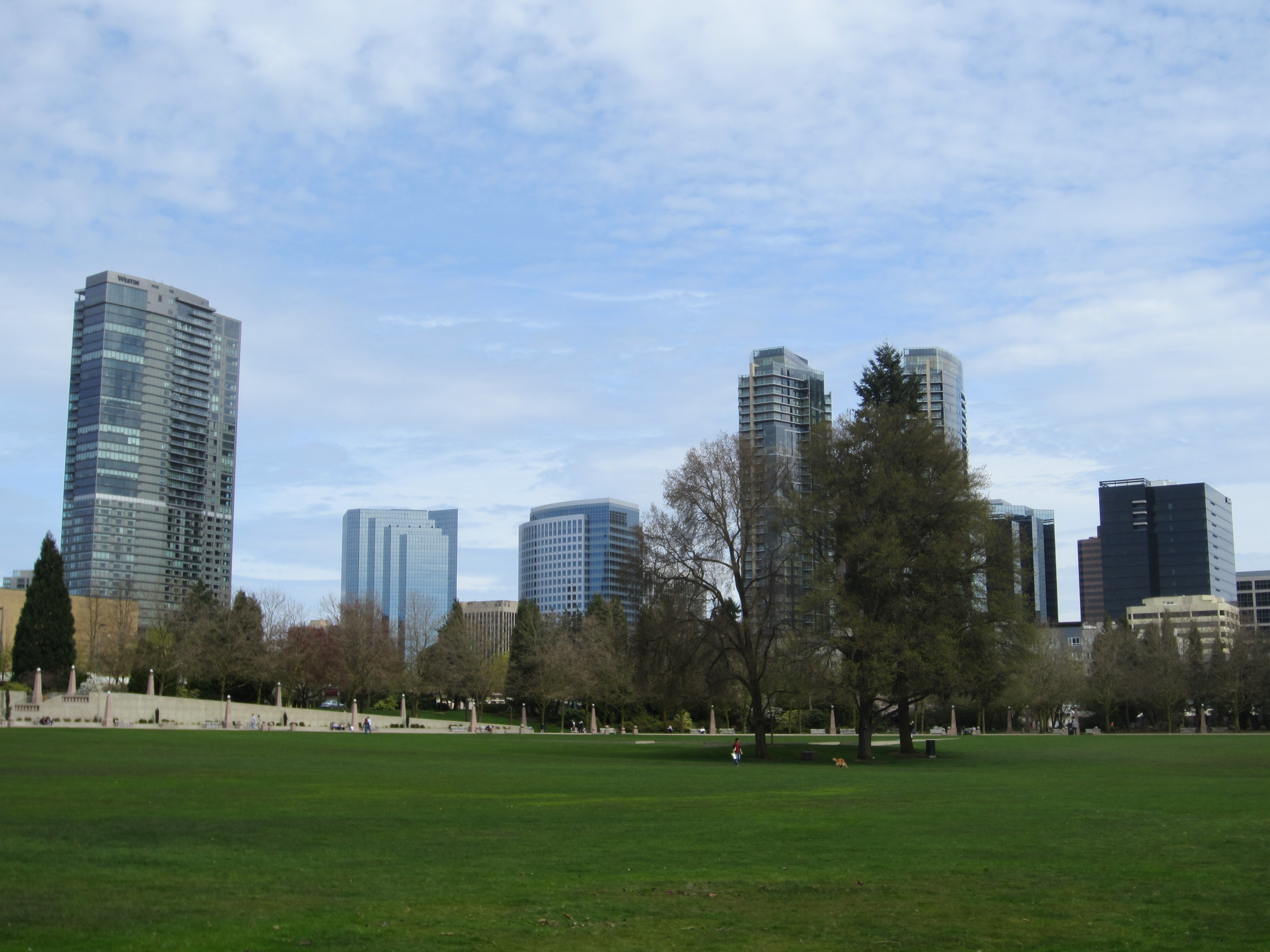
View from Bellevue Downtown Park

Bellevue is the largest city on the Eastside and fifth largest in the state. A major technology center, the Eastside is home to many large high-tech companies, mainly in the software and Wireless industries, including Microsoft, T-Mobile US, Nintendo of America, AT&T Mobility (formerly Cingular), the former Western Wireless (now part of Verizon Wireless), Vulcan Ventures, 180 Solutions and InfoSpace. Companies like Paccar, Puget Sound Energy, Symetra Insurance, Boeing, Verizon Wireless, Google, Amazon, Yahoo, Walt Disney, and Fox Sports also have national, major divisional or regional offices in the Eastside. The Eastside is also a hub for biotech and medical companies including Amgen, Icos, and Merck. Many local magnates, including Bill Gates, Steve Ballmer, John Stanton, and Craig McCaw, live in the Eastside's cities. The Eastside is also home to many video game and interactive media companies. These include Bungie, Valve, ArenaNet, Sucker Punch, Monolith Productions, Sony Online Entertainment, Warner Brothers Entertainment, Microsoft Game Studios, Epic Games, Unity Technologies and DigiPen Institute of Technology.

Kirkland hosts the annual Junior League Softball World Series. Kirkland Signature is also the own brand of Costco, which founded its first warehouse in Seattle (#1), and operates from its corporate headquarters in the Eastside city of Issaquah.

== Demographics ==
For the purposes of population estimates, Eastside includes Bellevue, Kirkland, Redmond, Sammamish, Issaquah, Newcastle, Mercer Island, Woodinville, Kenmore, and Bothell.

| City | Population (Jan 1, 2026) | 2020 | ! 2010 | ! 2000 | ! 1990 | ! 1980 | ! 1970 | ! 1960 |
|---|---|---|---|---|---|---|---|---|
| Bellevue | 159,532 | 151,854 | 122,363 | 109,569 | 86,874 | 73,903 | 61,196 | 12,809 |
| Kirkland | 98,418 | 92,175 | 48,787 | 45,054 | 40,052 | 18,785 | 14,970 | 6,025 |
| Redmond | 83,581 | 73,256 | 54,144 | 45,256 | 35,800 | 23,318 | 11,020 | 1,426 |
| Sammamish | 68,514 | 67,455 | 45,780 | 34,104 | – | – | – | – |
| Bothell | 31,886 | 48,161 | 33,505 | 30,150 | 12,345 | 7,943 | 5,420 | 2,237 |
| Issaquah | 41,591 | 40,051 | 30,434 | 11,212 | 7,786 | 5,536 | 4,313 | 1,870 |
| Mercer Island | 25,860 | 25,748 | 22,699 | 22,036 | 20,816 | 21,522 | 19,047 | – |
| Kenmore | 24,605 | 23,914 | 20,460 | 18,678 | 8,917 | 7,281 | – | – |
| Woodinville | 14,142 | 13,069 | 10,938 | 9,194 | – | – | – | – |
| Newcastle | 14,046 | 13,017 | 10,380 | 7,737 | 14,736 | 12,245 | – | – |
| Eastside altogether | 562,175 | 548,700 | 399,490 | 332,990 | 227,326 | 170,533 | 115,966 | 24,367 |
| King County | – | 2,269,675 | 1,931,249 | 1,737,034 | 1,507,319 | 1,269,749 | 1,156,633 | 935,014 |
| Eastside as percent of King County | – | 24.18% | 20.69% | 19.17% | 15.08% | 13.43% | 10.03% | 2.61% |
| Seattle | – | 737,015 | 608,660 | 563,374 | 516,259 | 493,846 | 530,831 | 557,087 |
| Seattle as percent of King County | – | 32.47% | 31.52% | 32.43% | 34.25% | 38.89% | 45.89% | 59.58% |

== Transportation ==
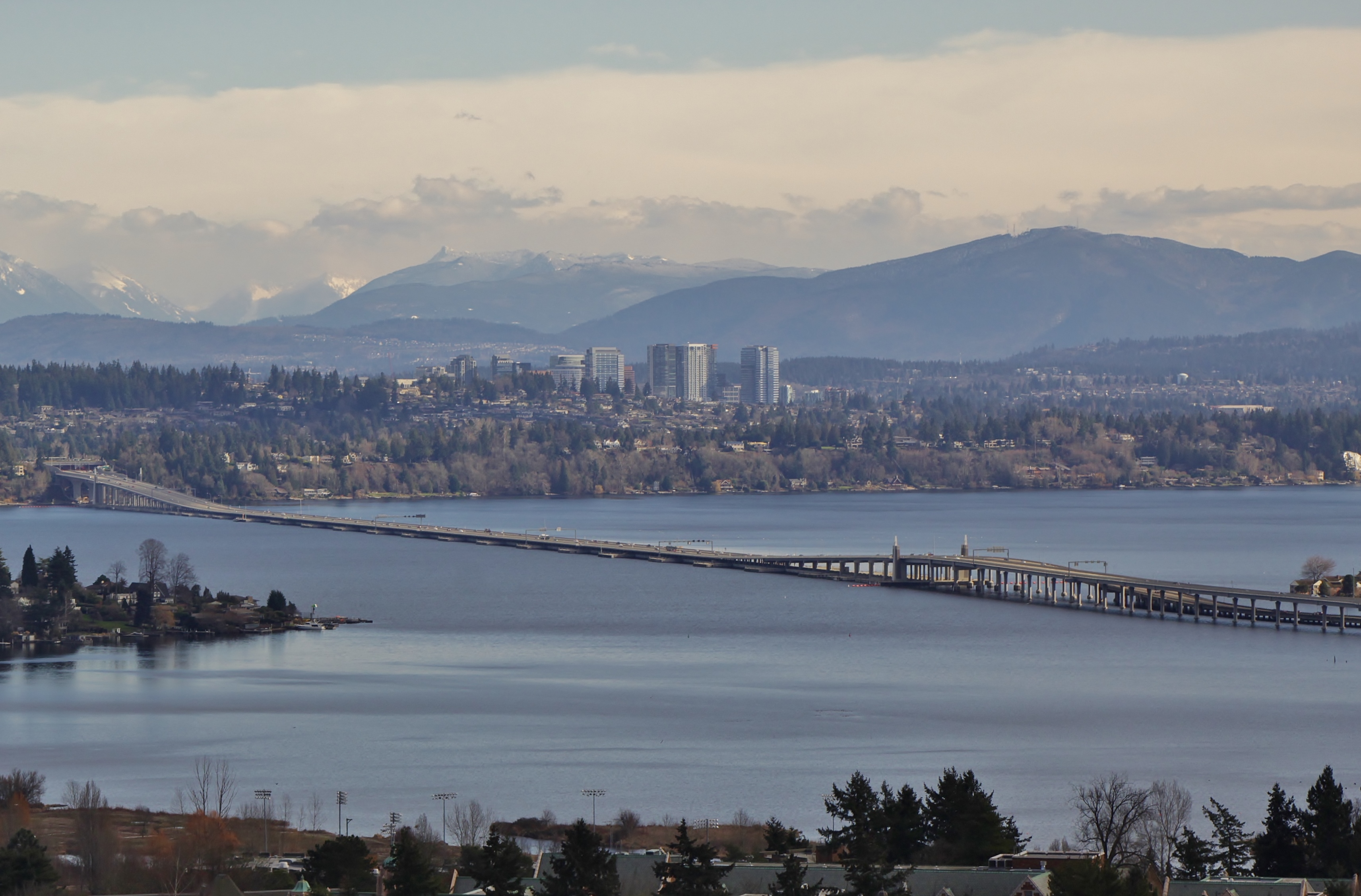
The Evergreen Point Floating Bridge on Lake Washington with Downtown Bellevue in the background

=== Air ===
There are public and private airfields on the Eastside. Major facilities include:

- Kenmore Air Harbor provides scheduled seaplane service to various points in the Northwest United States and southwest British Columbia.
- Renton Municipal Airport adjacent to the Boeing factory has a 1-mile (1.6 km) runway.
- Bellevue Airfield was closed in 1983.

There is also a landing zone for paragliding at the base of Tiger Mountain.

=== Rail ===
The Woodinville Subdivision is a rail line built in the late 19th century. In 2008, the Wilburton Tunnel was eliminated, severing the line. The right-of-way was purchased the same year by the Port of Seattle. Eastside cities and King County purchased portions of the Port property for conversion to a rail trail called the Eastside Rail Corridor.

=== Road ===
The Eastside is connected to Seattle by the Evergreen Point Floating Bridge from Medina (State Route 520) and the Lacey V. Murrow Memorial Bridge and Third Lake Washington Bridge from Bellevue via Mercer Island (Interstate 90). It is also served by Interstate 405, a loop route of Interstate 5 that runs to the east of Lake Washington from Tukwila to Lynnwood.
