= Clyde Hill, Washington =

- City
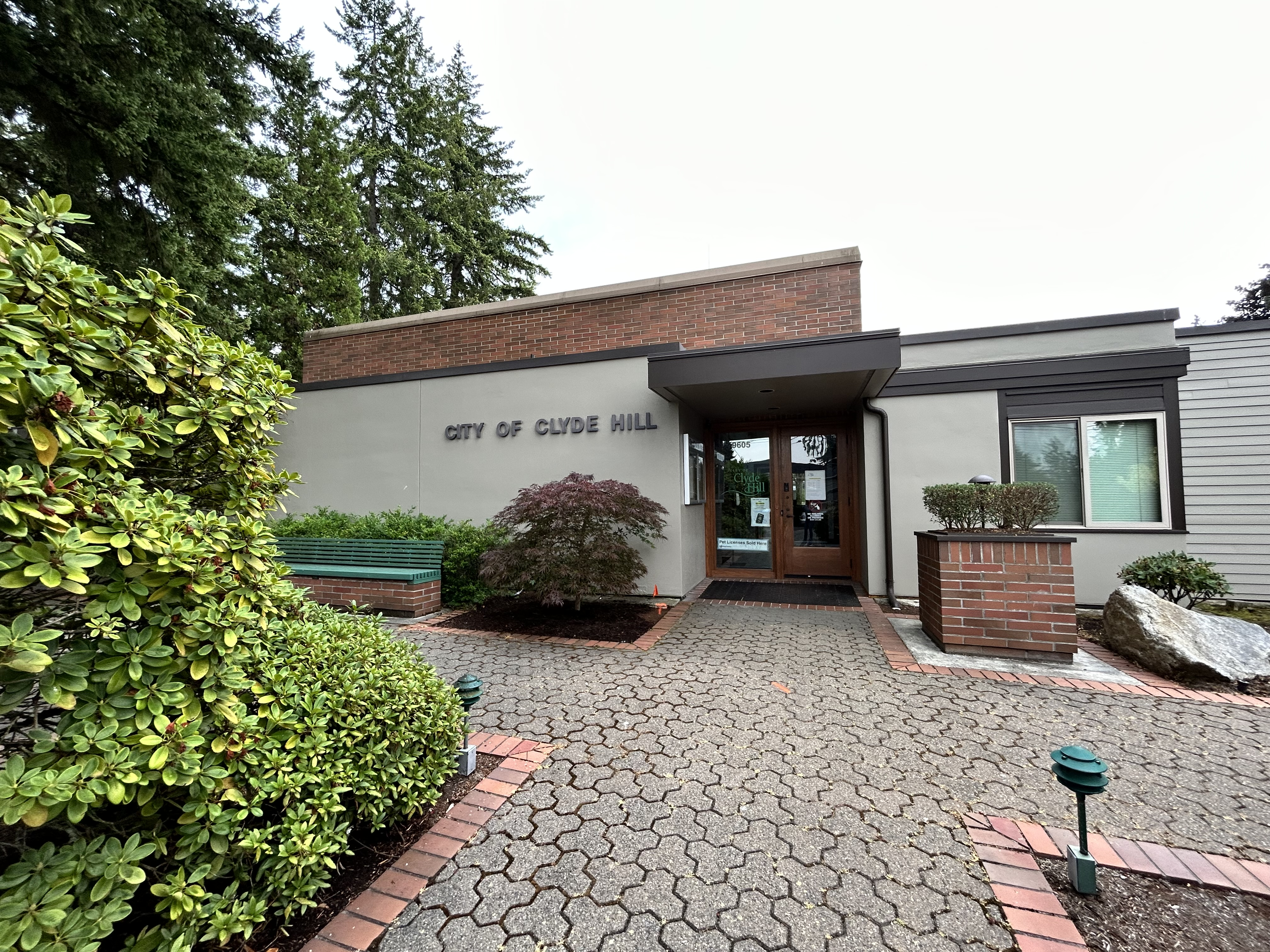
- Clyde Hill City Hall

- Location of Clyde Hill, Washington
- Coordinates: 47°37′36″N 122°13′06″W
- Country: United States
- State: Washington
- County: King

Government
  - Type: Mayor–council
  - Mayor: Dean Hachamovitch

Area
  - Total: 1.05 sq mi (2.73 km^{2})
  - Land: 1.05 sq mi (2.73 km^{2})
  - Water: 0 sq mi (0.00 km^{2})
- Elevation: 308 ft (94 m)

Population (2020)
  - Total: 3,126
  - Density: 3,208.3/sq mi (1,238.72/km^{2})
- Time zone: UTC-8 (Pacific (PST))
  - Summer (DST): UTC-7 (PDT)
- ZIP code: 98004
- Area code: 425
- FIPS code: 53-13365
- GNIS feature ID: 2409492
- Website: www.clydehill.org

Clyde Hill is a city located in King County, Washington. It is part of the Eastside region, located to the east of Seattle, and is bordered by the cities and towns of Bellevue, Kirkland, Medina, Yarrow Point and Hunts Point. The population was 3,126 at the 2020 census.

The majority of Clyde Hill is zoned for single-family use with the exception of two commercially zoned areas: a gas station and a coffee shop. In addition to a small government zone, the city is home to four schools: two public schools - Clyde Hill Elementary and Chinook Middle School; and two private schools: Bellevue Christian School and Sacred Heart School. The city's minimum lot size is 20,000 square feet, although many smaller lots exist that pre-date the incorporation of the city.

== Geography ==
The highest point in Clyde Hill (the summit of Clyde Hill) is 392 feet above sea level. There are approximately 21 miles of public roadways in Clyde Hill.

According to the United States Census Bureau, the city has a total area of 1.06 square miles (2.75 km^{2}), all of it land.

== History ==
Between 1946 and 1948, J. Gordon and Mary Schneidler subdivided and sold more than a dozen lots in a five-acre subdivision in Clyde Hill. Like many US housing projects following World War II, each deed of sale included an exclusionary racial covenant: "This property shall not be resold, leased, rented or occupied except to or by persons of the Aryan race."

In response to the community's desire to control land use development such as lot size and commercial zoning, Clyde Hill was officially incorporated as a Town on March 31, 1953. On November 10, 1998, the Council voted to organize Clyde Hill as a non-charter Code City.

In 1953 area residents voted to become an incorporated Town by a vote of 145 to 117. Ken Day defeated Don Clark for the first Clyde Hill Mayors position, 91 to 58. All initial councilmembers were elected on write-in votes.

The 1975 mayoral election between incumbent Liberino "Lib" Tufarolo and challenger Miles Nelson ended in a tie with 576 votes for each candidate. Per state law, the winner was decided through a coin flip, which brought national media attention. Nelson won the seat as he called heads.

== Politics ==
Presidential Elections Results
Year	Republican	Democratic	Third Parties
2020	33.19% 636	63.73% 1,221	3.08% 59
2016	32.53% 582	56.18% 1,005	11.29% 202
2012	52.79% 1,031	45.47% 888	1.74% 34

Clyde Hill leans liberal in its politics, though less so than neighboring Bellevue. In the 2016 presidential election, of the 1,789 residents who voted, 56.18% voted for Hillary Clinton compared to 32.53% for Donald Trump.

== Demographics ==
Historical population
Census	Pop.	Note	%±
1960	1,871		—
1970	2,987		59.6%
1980	3,229		8.1%
1990	2,972		−8.0%
2000	2,890		−2.8%
2010	2,984		3.3%
2020	3,126		4.8%
2021 (est.)	3,108		−0.6%
U.S. Decennial Census; 2015 Estimate

=== 2020 census ===
As of the 2020 census, Clyde Hill had a population of 3,126. The median age was 44.7 years. 28.3% of residents were under the age of 18 and 16.4% of residents were 65 years of age or older. For every 100 females there were 98.5 males, and for every 100 females age 18 or over there were 92.6 males age 18 and over.

100.0% of residents lived in urban areas, while 0.0% lived in rural areas.

There were 1,029 households in Clyde Hill, of which 48.7% had children under the age of 18 living in them. Of all households, 75.2% were married-couple households, 8.5% were households with a male householder and no spouse or partner present, and 14.4% were households with a female householder and no spouse or partner present. About 11.4% of all households were made up of individuals and 7.1% had someone living alone who was 65 years of age or older.

There were 1,098 housing units, of which 6.3% were vacant. The homeowner vacancy rate was 1.0% and the rental vacancy rate was 4.5%.

Racial composition as of the 2020 census
Race	Number	Percent
White	1,876	60.0%
Black or African American	1	0.0%
American Indian and Alaska Native	5	0.2%
Asian	1,019	32.6%
Native Hawaiian and Other Pacific Islander	0	0.0%
Some other race	34	1.1%
Two or more races	191	6.1%
Hispanic or Latino (of any race)	95	3.0%

=== 2010 census ===
At the 2010 census, there were 2,984 people in 1,028 households, including 887 families, in the city. The population density was 2,815.1 inhabitants per square mile (1,086.9/km^{2}). There were 1,099 housing units at an average density of 1,036.8 per square mile (400.3/km^{2}). The racial makeup of the city was 84.3% White, 0.6% African American, 0.2% Native American, 12.1% Asian, 0.5% from other races, and 2.2% from two or more races. Hispanic or Latino of any race were 2.3%.

Of the 1,028 households 43.0% had children under the age of 18 living with them, 79.2% were married couples living together, 4.8% had a female householder with no husband present, 2.3% had a male householder with no wife present, and 13.7% were non-families. 12.2% of households were one person and 7.8% were one person aged 65 or older. The average household size was 2.90 and the average family size was 3.17.

The median age was 44.8 years. 29.4% of residents were under the age of 18; 4.2% were between the ages of 18 and 24; 16.8% were from 25 to 44; 31.4% were from 45 to 64; and 18.4% were 65 or older. The gender makeup of the city was 48.9% male and 51.1% female.

== Education ==
The city is in the Bellevue School District.

Most residents are zoned to Clyde Hill Elementary School while some are zoned to Medina Elementary School. All residents are zoned to Chinook Middle School and Bellevue High School.

== Notable people ==
- Félix Hernández, Seattle Mariners pitcher
- Satya Nadella, CEO of Microsoft
- John Olerud, retired former MLB first baseman
- Alexey Pajitnov, creator of Tetris
