= Medina, Washington =

City in Washington, United States

Medina
- City
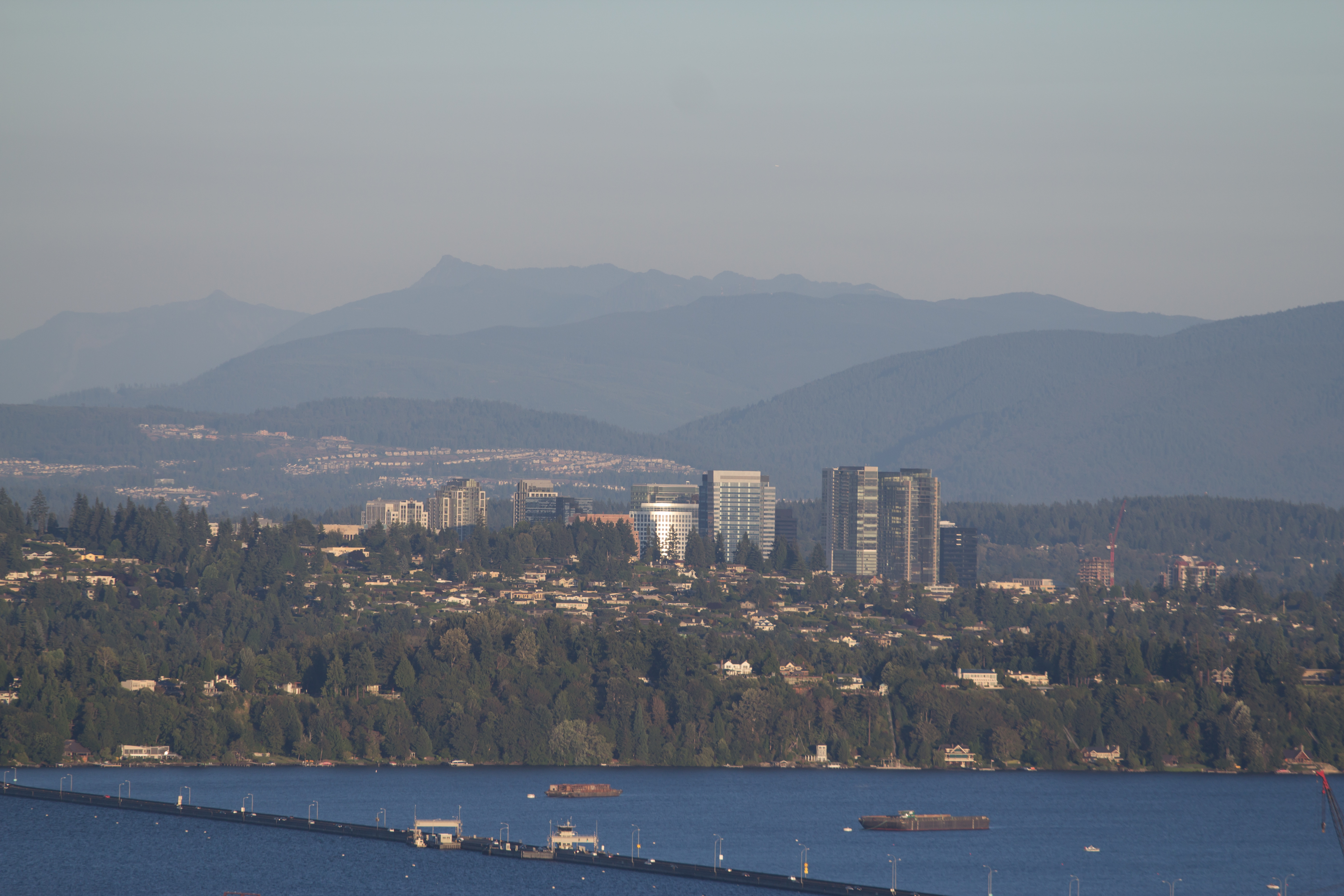
- Medina, pictured front just after the Evergreen Point Floating Bridge, with the Bellevue skyline behind

- Logo

- Location of Medina, Washington

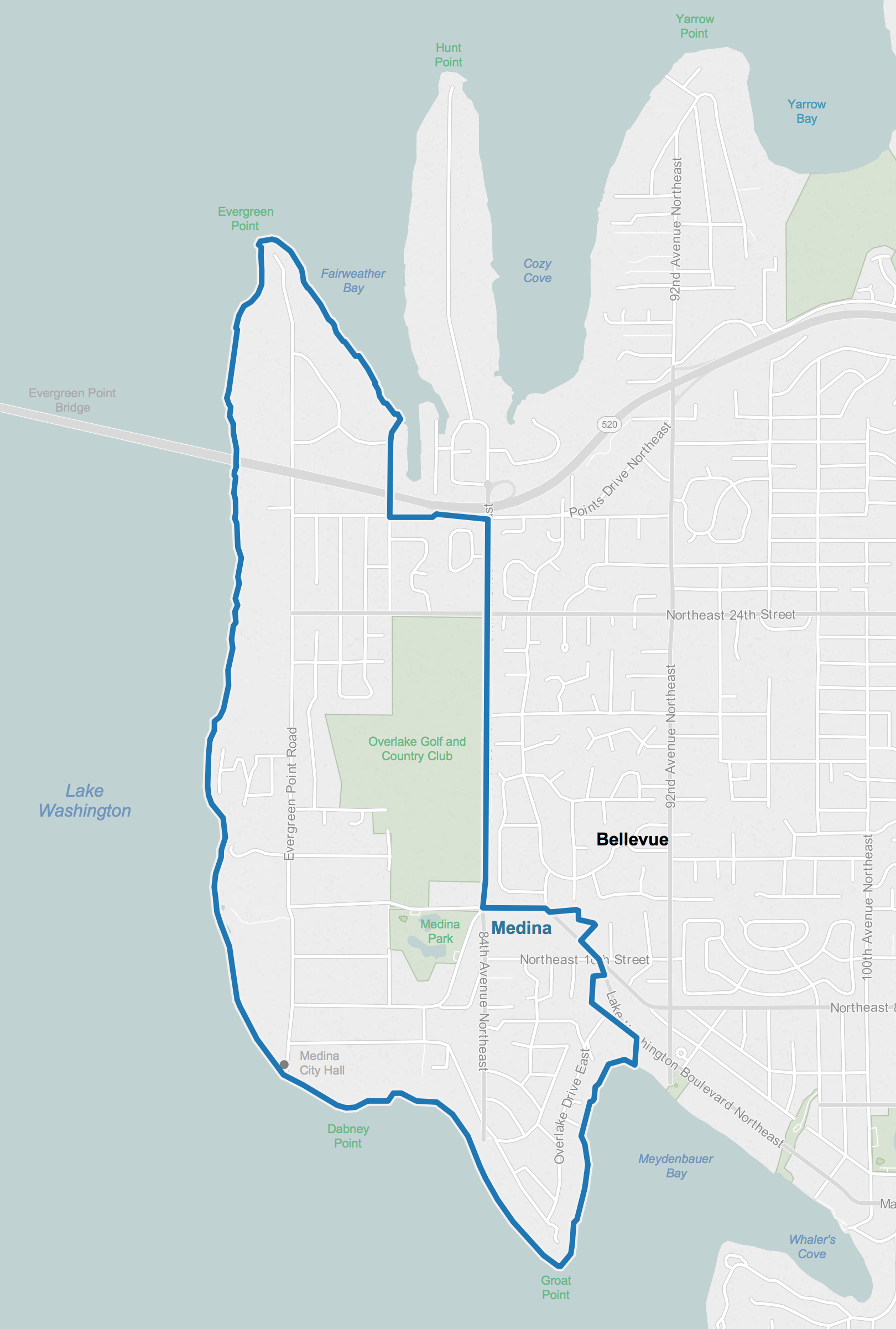
- City limits of Medina
- Coordinates: 47°37′36″N 122°13′58″W
- Country: United States
- State: Washington
- County: King
- Platted: 1914
- Incorporated: August 19, 1955
- Named for: Medina, Saudi Arabia

Government
  - Type: Council–manager
  - Mayor: Jessica Rossman
  - Deputy Mayor: Randy Reeves
  - City manager: Jeff Swanson

Area
  - Total: 4.83 sq mi (12.51 km^{2})
  - Land: 1.44 sq mi (3.72 km^{2})
  - Water: 3.39 sq mi (8.79 km^{2})
- Elevation: 30 ft (9.1 m)

Population (2020)
  - Total: 2,915
  - Density: 2,290.7/sq mi (884.44/km^{2})
- Time zone: UTC-8 (Pacific (PST))
  - Summer (DST): UTC-7 (PDT)
- ZIP code: 98039
- Area code: 425
- FIPS code: 53-44725
- GNIS feature ID: 2411071
- Website: www.medina-wa.gov

Medina (/məˈdaɪnə/) is a city in the Eastside region of King County, Washington in greater Seattle, United States. The mostly residential city is on a peninsula in Lake Washington, on the opposite shore from Seattle, bordered by Clyde Hill and Hunts Point to the east and water on all other sides. The city's population was 2,915 at the 2020 census. Bill Gates and Jeff Bezos, along with a number of billionaires and executives for tech companies, have homes in Medina.

== History ==
The eastern shore of Lake Washington between Meydenbauer Bay and Evergreen Point was a sparsely populated area that was cleared for its timber in the 1870s. Seattle businessman Thomas Dabney established a claim on the south side of modern-day Medina in 1886, becoming the area's first permanent white settler. Dabney built a ferry dock in 1890, naming it Dabney's Landing, while the surrounding area was turned into berry farms and fruit orchards. Other settlers arrived at Dabney's Landing, which was briefly named Flordeline by its founder until objections were raised by a group of women who proposed the Arabic name "Medina" in 1891. After a series of debates and sign-switching incidents, Medina won and was adopted as the name of the town.

Medina was platted in 1914 and officially incorporated on August 19, 1955. The town's first mansions were built in the 1920s by wealthy Seattle businessmen, encouraged by the arrival of direct ferry service, and led to the nickname of Washington's "Gold Coast". The area's farmers, mostly of Japanese descent, were evicted during the 1940s internment and their farms were turned over for redevelopment.

== Surveillance ==
In 2009, Medina, with the "wide support of residents", installed cameras at intersections along roads entering the city. The cameras are used to capture the license plate number of every car, and a security system automatically notifies local police if the captured number is recorded in a database. Travelers are notified of the presence of the system with signs that read "You Are Entering a 24 Hour Video Surveillance Area"; according to Medina's police chief, all captured information is stored for 60 days even if nothing negative is found in the database, allowing police to mine data if a crime occurs later. One of the city's council members said the system was motivated by the belief that the need for crime prevention "outweighs concern over privacy". The system was inspired by that used in adjacent Hunts Point, a town of about 500 residents which has not had a break-in for more than three years after installing their system.

== Tree Code ==
Designated as a Tree City USA by the Arbor Day Foundation since 2006, Medina has always been a leader in urban tree codes. Since 1972, the City of Medina has codified the value that trees bring to a community, and the Tree Code ordinances have consistently been modified throughout the years. Major revisions in 2000, 2003 and 2006 have improved the code such that it is one of the most extensive in the region. The current code (2006 edition) protects large trees and requires significant mitigation if they are removed.

In 2011, the City Council directed the Planning Commission to update the existing tree code. Dividing the task into two phases, the Planning Commission brought Phase I, which were largely administrative changes, to Council in 2014, where it was passed into law. Phase II changes have been underway since then, with much work and input from the community, an ad hoc tree committee, the Planning Commission and City Council. It is anticipated that the new code will be adopted in mid-2015.

== Geography ==
According to the United States Census Bureau, the city has a total area of 4.79 square miles (12.41 km^{2}), of which, 1.44 square miles (3.73 km^{2}) is land and 3.35 square miles (8.68 km^{2}) is water.

Medina is connected to Seattle, on the western shore of Lake Washington, by State Route 520 on the Evergreen Point Floating Bridge, the longest floating bridge in the world.

=== Climate ===
This region experiences warm (but not hot) and dry summers, with no average monthly temperatures above 71.6 °F. According to the Köppen Climate Classification system, Medina has a warm-summer Mediterranean climate, abbreviated "Csb" on climate maps.

== Government and politics ==
The City of Medina is a non-charter code city with a council–manager government. The city council is composed of seven members elected in non-partisan, at-large elections to four-year terms. The council elects a ceremonial mayor and deputy mayor from its members, serving a two-year term, and appoint a city manager to execute its legislative policies and oversee the government. The current city manager is Jeff Swanson. Despite its wealthy residents, the city government had a budget shortfall of 8 percent forecast for 2020. A property tax increase was approved by a narrow margin in the November 2019 elections.

Medina has traditionally been a Republican stronghold at the local and national levels. However, like neighboring communities, it has become more competitive between the two major parties in recent elections.

=== State level ===
Medina is part of the 48th Legislative District, and its current legislators in the Washington State Legislature are:

- Senator Vandana Slatter
- Representative Osman Salahuddin
- Representative Amy Walen

The 48th district also includes the more Democratic leaning area of adjacent Bellevue.

=== Nationally ===
Medina is part of the 1st Congressional District. Its current Representative is Suzan DelBene.

As part of Washington, Medina is represented by Senators Patty Murray and Maria Cantwell.

In the 2008 US Presidential Election, Barack Obama received more votes than the Republican nominee, John McCain, and carried all 4 precincts. In the 2012 US Presidential Election, the Republican nominee, Mitt Romney, received 1025 votes, while Barack Obama, the Democratic incumbent received 934 votes. Mitt Romney carried 3 out of the 4 precincts in Medina. In the 2016 US Presidential Election, of the 1,856 who cast votes, 57.49% voted for Hillary Clinton and 33.19% for Donald Trump.

== Demographics ==
Historical population
Census	Pop.	Note	%±
1960	2,285		—
1970	3,455		51.2%
1980	3,220		−6.8%
1990	2,981		−7.4%
2000	3,011		1.0%
2010	2,969		−1.4%
2020	2,915		−1.8%
2021 (est.)	2,886		−1.0%
U.S. Decennial Census; 2015 Estimate

Medina in 1915

=== 2020 census ===
As of the 2020 census, Medina had a population of 2,915. The median age was 46.6 years. 25.7% of residents were under the age of 18 and 18.7% of residents were 65 years of age or older. For every 100 females there were 94.1 males, and for every 100 females age 18 and over there were 91.7 males age 18 and over.

100.0% of residents lived in urban areas, while 0.0% lived in rural areas.

There were 1,015 households in Medina, of which 42.4% had children under the age of 18 living in them. Of all households, 72.6% were married-couple households, 7.8% were households with a male householder and no spouse or partner present, and 17.3% were households with a female householder and no spouse or partner present. About 14.5% of all households were made up of individuals and 8.7% had someone living alone who was 65 years of age or older.

There were 1,131 housing units, of which 10.3% were vacant. The homeowner vacancy rate was 2.5% and the rental vacancy rate was 10.3%.

Racial composition as of the 2020 census
Race	Number	Percent
White	1,851	63.5%
Black or African American	13	0.4%
American Indian and Alaska Native	5	0.2%
Asian	851	29.2%
Native Hawaiian and Other Pacific Islander	0	0.0%
Some other race	18	0.6%
Two or more races	177	6.1%
Hispanic or Latino (of any race)	93	3.2%

=== 2010 census ===
As of the 2010 census, there were 2,969 people, 1,061 households, and 865 families residing in the city. The population density was 2,061.8 inhabitants per square mile (796.1/km^{2}). There were 1,162 housing units at an average density of 806.9 per square mile (311.5/km^{2}). The racial makeup of the city was 83.5% White, 0.3% African American, 0.2% Native American, 11.7% Asian, 0.1% Pacific Islander, 0.5% from other races, and 3.8% from two or more races. Hispanic or Latino of any race were 2.6% of the population.

There were 1,061 households, of which 40.0% had children under the age of 18 living with them, 73.1% were married couples living together, 5.7% had a female householder with no husband present, 2.6% had a male householder with no wife present, and 18.5% were non-families. 16.2% of all households were made up of individuals, and 8.6% had someone living alone who was 65 years of age or older. The average household size was 2.80 and the average family size was 3.13.

The median age in the city was 45.5 years. 29% of residents were under the age of 18; 4.7% were between the ages of 18 and 24; 15.1% were from 25 to 44; 32.8% were from 45 to 64; and 18.2% were 65 years of age or older. The gender makeup of the city was 49.4% male and 50.6% female.

=== 2000 census ===
As of the 2000 census, there were 3,011 people, 1,111 households, and 905 families residing in the city. The population density was 2,102.3 people per square mile (813.0/km^{2}). There were 1,165 housing units at an average density of 813.4 per square mile (314.6/km^{2}). The racial makeup of the city was 92.63% White, 4.88% Asian, 0.27% Native American, 0.17% African American, 0.07% Pacific Islander, 0.33% from other races, and 1.66% from two or more races. Hispanics or Latinos of any race were 1.39% of the population.

There were 1,111 households, out of which 38.1% had children under the age of 18 living with them, 74.6% were married couples living together, 5.3% had a female householder with no husband present, and 18.5% were non-families. 14.7% of all households were made up of individuals, and 7.0% had someone living alone who was 65 years of age or older. The average household size was 2.71 and the average family size was 3.00.

The age distribution was 30.1% under the age of 18, 3.5% from 18 to 24, 23.5% from 25 to 44, 29.6% from 45 to 64, and 16.2% who were 65 years of age or older. The median age was 43 years. For every 100 females, there were 96.2 males. For every 100 females age 18 and over, there were 93.6 males.

The median income for a household in the city was $133,756, and the median income for a family was $149,637. Males had a median income of $100,000 versus $50,893 for females. The per capita income for the city was $81,742. About 0.2% of families and 0.8% of the population were below the poverty line, including none of those under age 18 and 1.0% of those age 65 or over.

== Notable people ==
- Jeff Bezos, founder and executive chairman of Amazon
- Jeffrey Brotman, attorney, businessman and the co-founder of Costco Wholesale Corporation
- Jeff Cirillo, former MLB third baseman, currently MLB Scout with the Los Angeles Angels of Anaheim
- Norton Clapp, former chairman of Weyerhaeuser
- Suzan DelBene, U.S. representative
- Bill Gates, co-founder and former chairman of Microsoft, philanthropist
- Melinda French Gates, co-founder of Gates Foundation and philanthropist
- Gerald Grinstein, former CEO of Delta Air Lines
- Nathan Myhrvold, formerly chief technology officer at Microsoft, is co-founder of Intellectual Ventures and the principal author of Modernist Cuisine
- Wayne M. Perry, former president McCaw Cellular, vice-chairman of AT&T Wireless Services, founder Edge Wireless, former national president of the Boy Scouts of America
- Mark Pigott, executive chairman of the board of directors of Paccar
- William Ruckelshaus, former administrator of the Environmental Protection Agency, former acting director of the Federal Bureau of Investigation (FBI), and former United States Deputy Attorney General
- MacKenzie Scott, author and philanthropist
- Jon Shirley, former Microsoft president and noted art collector
- Jack Sikma, Hall of Fame NBA center for the Seattle SuperSonics
- Charles Simonyi, former Microsoft executive
- Lenny Wilkens, former NBA basketball player and former coach of the Seattle SuperSonics

== Education ==
Public education is provided by the Bellevue School District, with schools within Medina and in nearby Bellevue.

Residents are zoned to Medina Elementary School (K to 5), Chinook Middle School, and Bellevue High School.

There are two private schools in Medina:

- Bellevue Christian School – Three Points Elementary (private, K to 6)
- Saint Thomas School (private, pre-K to 8)
