= Hunts Point, Washington =

- Town
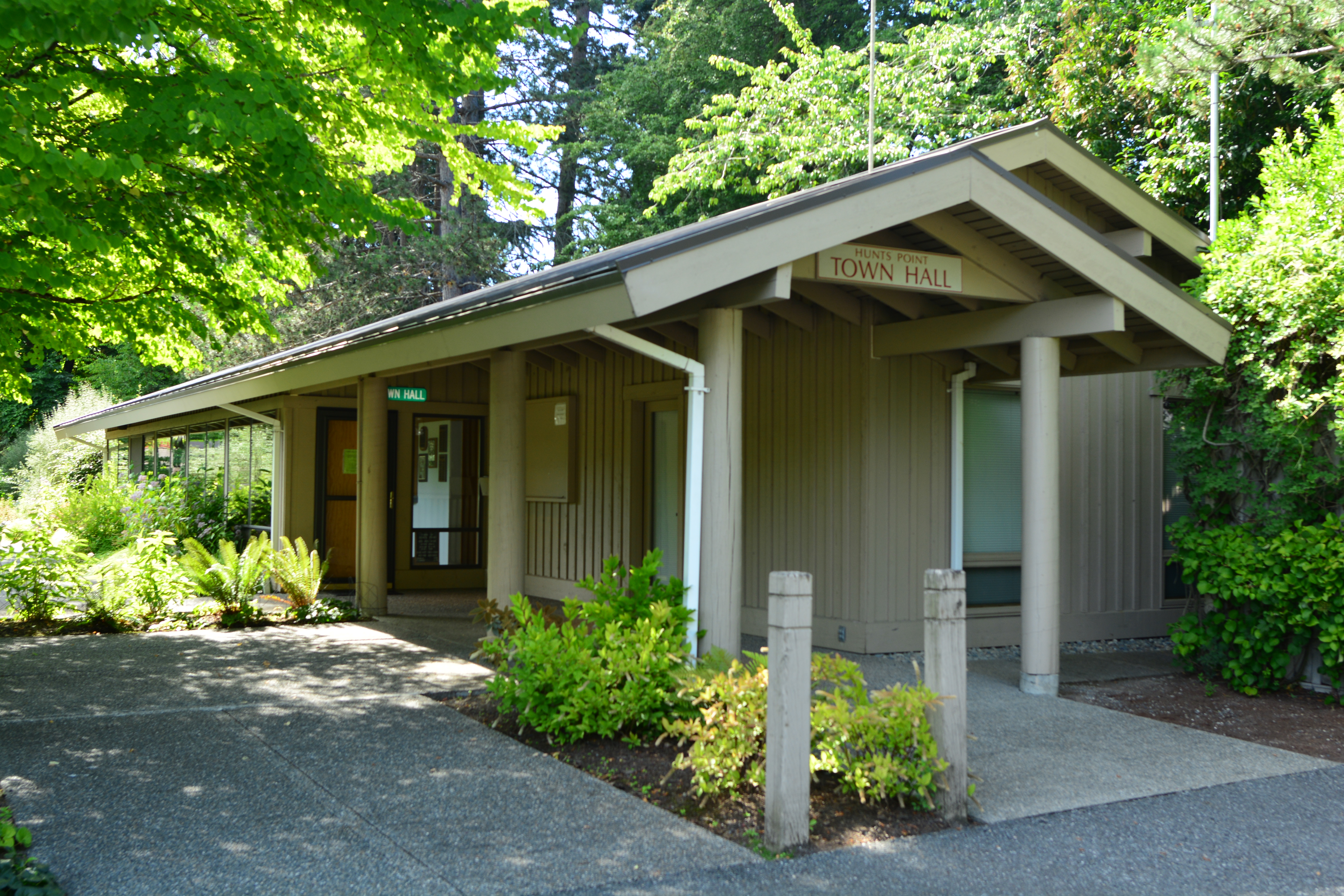
- Town hall

- Location of Hunts Point, Washington
- Coordinates: 47°38′49″N 122°13′50″W
- Country: United States
- State: Washington
- County: King

Government
  - Type: Mayor–council
  - Mayor: Joe Sabey

Area
  - Total: 0.75 sq mi (1.94 km^{2})
  - Land: 0.31 sq mi (0.79 km^{2})
  - Water: 0.44 sq mi (1.15 km^{2})
- Elevation: 49 ft (15 m)

Population (2020)
  - Total: 457
  - Density: 1,417.7/sq mi (547.37/km^{2})
- Time zone: UTC-8 (Pacific (PST))
  - Summer (DST): UTC-7 (PDT)
- ZIP code: 98004
- Area code: 425
- FIPS code: 53-32755
- GNIS feature ID: 2412782
- Website: huntspoint-wa.gov

Hunts Point is a town in the Eastside, a region of King County, Washington, United States, and part of the Seattle metropolitan area. The town is on a small peninsula surrounded by Lake Washington, and is near the suburbs of Medina (to the southwest), Clyde Hill (to the south), Yarrow Point (on another peninsula to the east), and Kirkland (to the northeast), as well as the city of Bellevue (to the east). As of the 2020 census, the town had a total population of 457.

== History ==
Leigh S. J. Hunt, a resident of nearby Yarrow Point, purchased the yet-to-be-named property of Hunts Point on March 13, 1890. He wanted the property so that he could cut down the tall evergreen trees that grew out at the end, obstructing his view of Lake Washington. Around 1900, the property was taken over by Puget Sound National Bank and sold to a group of Seattle men who used it as a family retreat for Sunday picnics and summer camping.

Before the creation of the Evergreen Point Floating Bridge, Lacey V. Murrow Memorial Bridge, and Homer M. Hadley Memorial Bridge across Lake Washington, residents commuted to Seattle via the Gazelle, one of several ferries on Lake Washington. The Gazelle arrived at Cozy Cove (between Hunts Point and Yarrow Points) each morning at 7:15 a.m.

A clubhouse was built in 1913 at what is now 3655 Hunts Point Road. It became the center of Hunts Point's social activity through the 1920s. That same year, the women of Hunts Point formed a charitable organization called the "Eastside Circle of the Seattle Fruit and Flower Mission" (later called the Overlake Service League), which continues to this day.

Hunts Point was incorporated as a city on August 22, 1955. The Fairweather Basin was developed from marshland into residential property in 1957. The city's first sewers were installed in 1960. The original Evergreen Point Floating Bridge, connecting Hunts Point to Seattle, was opened on August 28, 1963. The Wetherill Nature Preserve was created by a donation of land in 1988.

In the 1950s, Stan Sayres, owner of the famous Slo Mo unlimited hydroplane, housed the boat at the end of Hunts Point Road.

== Geography ==
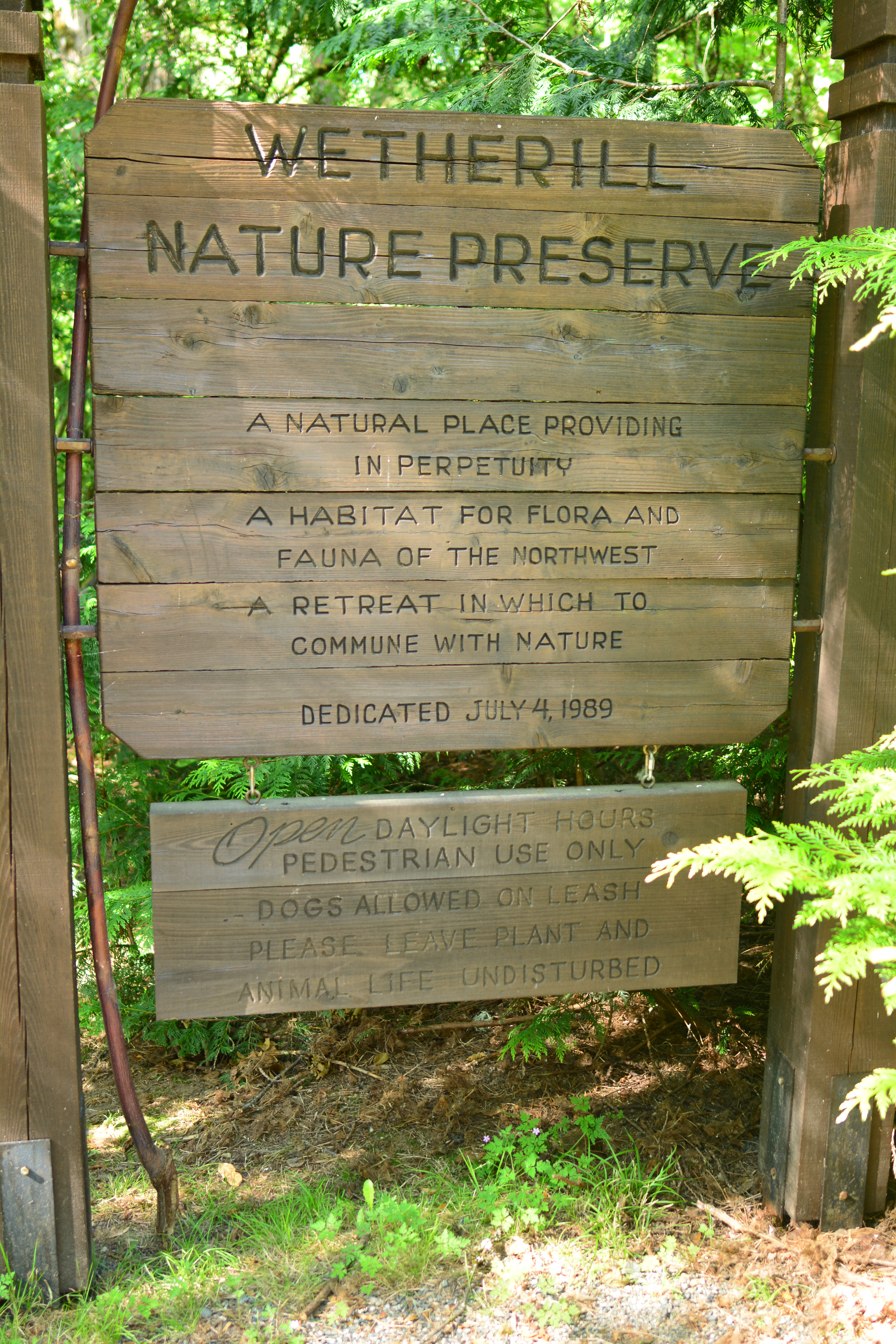
Wetherill Nature Preserve in Hunts Point

According to the United States Census Bureau, the town has a total area of 0.30 square miles (0.78 km^{2}), of which, 0.29 square miles (0.75 km^{2}) is land and 0.01 square miles (0.03 km^{2}) is water.

== Government and politics ==
Presidential Elections Results
Year	Republican	Democratic	Third Parties
2020	39.29% 121	59.42% 183	1.30% 4

Hunts Point is part of the 48th Legislative District of Washington. The district's legislators are:

- Senator Patty Kuderer, Democrat
- Representative Vandana Slatter, Democrat
- Representative Joan McBride, Democrat

Hunts Point is part of Washington's 1st congressional district, represented by Suzan DelBene, Democrat.

George W. Bush made a fund-raising stop in the town during each of his presidential campaigns. The August 22, 2003, visit cost the town $23,634.25 for police security.

The town of Hunts Point, along with neighboring Yarrow Point, has no agreement to participate in the King County Library System, which precludes residents from holding library cards or using library services.

In the 2016 presidential election, Hillary Clinton defeated Donald Trump 161 votes to 116 in Hunts Point.

== Demographics ==
Historical population
Census	Pop.	Note	%±
1960	428		—
1970	578		35.0%
1980	480		−17.0%
1990	513		6.9%
2000	443		−13.6%
2010	394		−11.1%
2020	457		16.0%
2021 (est.)	449	▼	−1.8%
U.S. Decennial Census

=== 2010 census ===
At the 2010 census there were 394 people, 151 households, and 124 families living in the town. The population density was 1,358.6 inhabitants per square mile (524.6/km^{2}). There were 181 housing units at an average density of 624.1 per square mile (241.0/km^{2}). The racial makeup of the town was 80.2% White, 1.3% African American, 0.5% Native American, 10.9% Asian, and 7.1% from two or more races. Hispanic or Latino of any race were 0.5%.

Of the 151 households 31.1% had children under the age of 18 living with them, 74.8% were married couples living together, 4.0% had a female householder with no husband present, 3.3% had a male householder with no wife present, and 17.9% were non-families. 16.6% of households were one person and 10.6% were one person aged 65 or older. The average household size was 2.61 and the average family size was 2.90.

The median age in the town was 49.5 years. 23.1% of residents were under the age of 18; 5.8% were between the ages of 18 and 24; 15.2% were from 25 to 44; 31.4% were from 45 to 64; and 24.4% were 65 or older. The gender makeup of the town was 53.8% male and 46.2% female.

=== 2000 census ===
At the 2000 census, there were 443 people, 165 households, and 131 families living in the town. The population density was 1,516.6 people per square mile (589.8/km^{2}). There were 186 housing units at an average density of 636.8 per square mile (247.6/km^{2}). The racial makeup of the town was 94.81% White, 0.45% African American, 2.71% Asian, 0.23% from other races, and 1.81% from two or more races. Hispanic or Latino of any race were 2.26% of the population. 21.4% were of English, 11.5% German, 10.9% European, 5.9% Swedish and 5.0% Dutch ancestry according to Census 2000.

Of the 165 households 32.1% had children under the age of 18 living with them, 73.3% were married couples living together, 3.6% had a female householder with no husband present, and 20.6% were non-families. 15.2% of households were one person and 7.9% were one person aged 65 or older. The average household size was 2.68 and the average family size was 2.98.

The age distribution was 26.0% under the age of 18, 3.8% from 18 to 24, 20.3% from 25 to 44, 34.1% from 45 to 64, and 15.8% 65 or older. The median age was 45 years. For every 100 females, there were 102.3 males. For every 100 females age 18 and over, there were 98.8 males.

The median household income was $179,898 and the median family income was $200,000. Males had a median income of $100,000 versus $40,417 for females. The per capita income for the town was $113,816. None of the families and 1.1% of the population were living below the poverty line, including no under eighteens and 2.6% of those over 64.

== Notable residents, past and present ==
- Eric C. Anderson, co-founder of Planetary Resources
- Steve Ballmer, former CEO of Microsoft
- Jeff Bezos, founder and former CEO of Amazon.com
- Pete Carroll, former head coach of Seattle Seahawks
- Kenny G, American adult contemporary and smooth jazz saxophonist
- Bruce McCaw (born 1946), businessman
- Craig McCaw, founder of McCaw Cellular
- Blake Nordstrom, former president of Nordstrom
- Scott Oki, former senior vice-president of sales and marketing of Microsoft
- Jim Sinegal, former CEO and co-founder of Costco Wholesale
- B. Kevin Turner, former COO of Microsoft

== Education ==
The city is in the Bellevue School District.

Residents are zoned to: Clyde Hill Elementary School, Chinook Middle School, and Bellevue High School.
