= Yarrow Point, Washington =

- Town
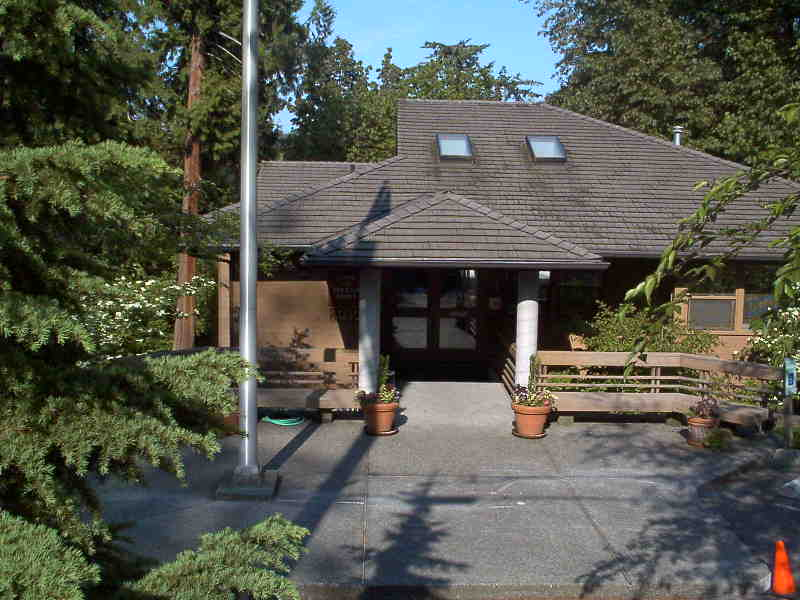
- Yarrow Point Town Hall

- Location of Yarrow Point, Washington
- Coordinates: 47°38′57″N 122°13′09″W
- Country: United States
- State: Washington
- County: King

Government
  - Mayor: Katy Kinney Harris

Area
  - Total: 0.80 sq mi (2.08 km^{2})
  - Land: 0.37 sq mi (0.95 km^{2})
  - Water: 0.44 sq mi (1.14 km^{2})
- Elevation: 56 ft (17 m)

Population (2020)
  - Total: 1,134
  - Density: 3,137.4/sq mi (1,211.34/km^{2})
- Time zone: UTC-8 (Pacific (PST))
  - Summer (DST): UTC-7 (PDT)
- ZIP code: 98004
- Area code: 425
- FIPS code: 53-80150
- GNIS feature ID: 2413520
- Website: yarrowpointwa.gov

Yarrow Point is a town in King County, Washington, United States. The population was 1,134 at the 2020 census.

== History ==
Before the arrival of settlers the Duwamish set up two longhouses along Yarrow Bay, although most of the tribe lived in the area occupied by the present day cities of Renton and Seattle. The town was named by newspaper publisher Leigh S. J. Hunt, who lived there from 1886 to 1895, after William Wordsworth's Yarrow poems, which describe the Yarrow Water of Scotland.

== Geography ==
Yarrow Point occupies a peninsula near the eastern edge of Lake Washington, lying between the lake's Cozy Cove and Yarrow Bay and nearly all of it north of Washington State Route 520. It is bordered by Hunts Point on the west, Clyde Hill on the south, and by Kirkland on the east.

According to the United States Census Bureau, the town has a total area of 0.36 square miles (0.93 km^{2}).

== Politics ==
On the national level, Yarrow Point previously leaned toward the Republican Party. In 2004, Republican George W. Bush received 52 percent of the vote, defeating Democrat John Kerry, who received around 47 percent. However, in the 2016 presidential election, of the 694 residents who voted, 58.93% voted for Hillary Clinton and 29.83% for Donald Trump. The town moved further into the Democratic column in the 2020 presidential election, as 70.69% of those who voted voted for Joe Biden, while 26.29% voted for Donald Trump.

United States presidential election results for Yarrow Point, Washington
Year	Republican		Democratic		Third party(ies)	
Year	No.	%	No.	%	No.	%
2016	207	29.83%	409	58.93%	78	11.24%
2020	209	26.29%	562	70.69%	24	3.02%
2024	153	29.82%	347	67.64%	13	2.53%

== Demographics ==
Historical population
Census	Pop.	Note	%±
1960	766		—
1970	1,101		43.7%
1980	1,064		−3.4%
1990	962		−9.6%
2000	1,008		4.8%
2010	1,001		−0.7%
2020	1,134		13.3%
2021 (est.)	1,117	▼	−1.5%
U.S. Decennial Census

=== 2020 census ===
As of the 2020 census, there were 1,134 people, 479 households, and 414 families living in the town. The population density was 2,577.3 inhabitants per square mile (995.1/km^{2}). There were 500 housing units at an average density of 1,136.4 per square mile (438.8/km^{2}). The racial makeup of the town was 68.7% White, 0.1% African American, 0.1% Native American, 23.0% Asian, 0.8% from other races, and 7.3% from two or more races. Hispanic or Latino of any race were 3.0% of the population.

There were 387 households, of which 41.9% had children under the age of 18 living with them and 38.5% had an individual over the age of 65. 77.5% were married couples living together, 11.6% had a female householder with no husband present, 8.3% had a male householder with no wife present, and 2.6% were cohabitating couples. The average household size was 2.82 and the average family size was 2.95.

The median age in the town was 47.9 years. 25.0% of residents were under the age of 18; The gender makeup of the town was 49.2% male and 50.8% female.

=== 2010 census ===
As of the 2010 census, there were 1,001 people, 374 households, and 299 families living in the town. The population density was 2,780.6 inhabitants per square mile (1,073.6/km^{2}). There were 407 housing units at an average density of 1,130.6 per square mile (436.5/km^{2}). The racial makeup of the town was 86.4% White, 0.1% African American, 0.2% Native American, 8.8% Asian, 0.7% from other races, and 3.8% from two or more races. Hispanic or Latino of any race were 1.6% of the population.

There were 374 households, of which 39.8% had children under the age of 18 living with them, 72.5% were married couples living together, 5.6% had a female householder with no husband present, 1.9% had a male householder with no wife present, and 20.1% were non-families. 17.4% of all households were made up of individuals, and 10.4% had someone living alone who was 65 years of age or older. The average household size was 2.68 and the average family size was 3.04.

The median age in the town was 46.8 years. 27.7% of residents were under the age of 18; 3.6% were between the ages of 18 and 24; 15.7% were from 25 to 44; 33.5% were from 45 to 64; and 19.6% were 65 years of age or older. The gender makeup of the town was 49.6% male and 50.4% female.

== Education ==
The city is in the Bellevue School District.

Residents are zoned to: Clyde Hill Elementary School, Chinook Middle School, and Bellevue High School.

Yarrow Point does not have library access.

== Notable people ==
- Chris Ballew, musician

== Gallery ==
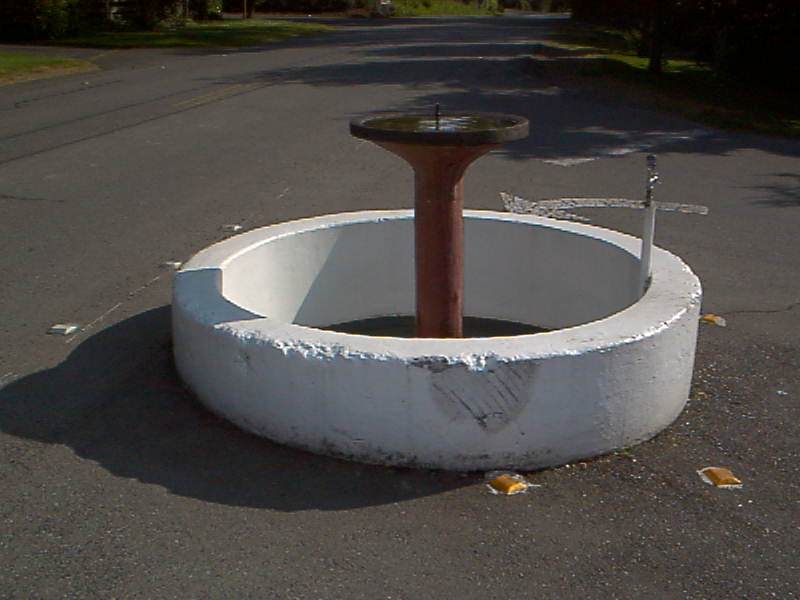
Yarrow Point Water Fountain

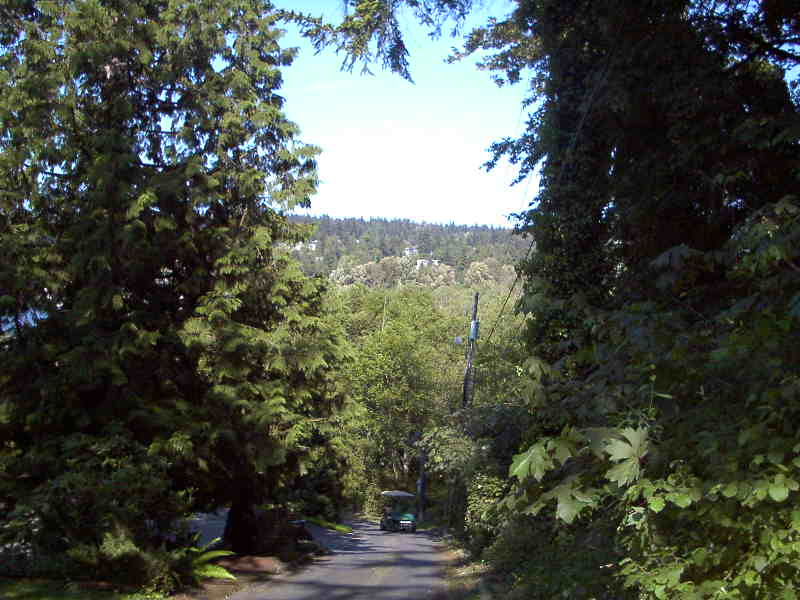
On NE 42nd Pl. looking east near a dock

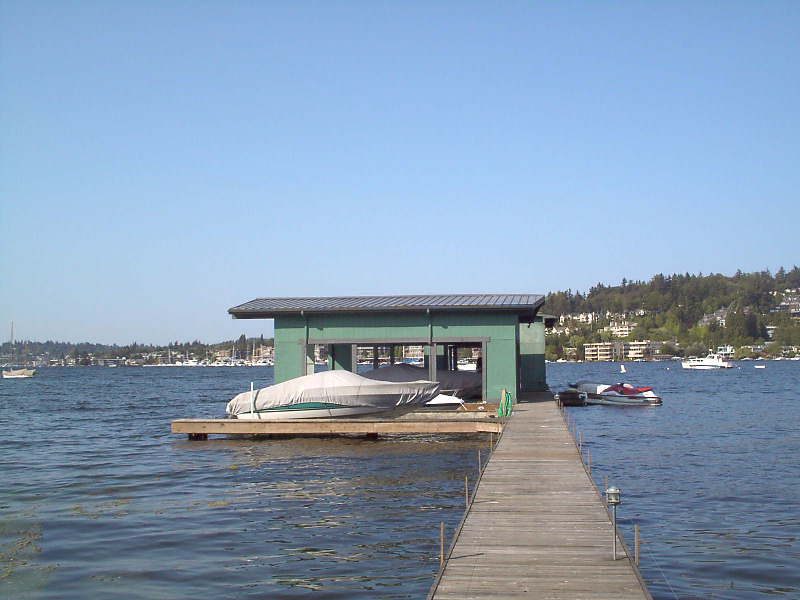
At a dock at the end of NE 42nd Pl. in Yarrow Point.
