= Newport High School (Bellevue, Washington) =

Location
- 4333 Factoria Boulevard SE; Bellevue, Washington 98006; United States; 47°34′05″N 122°10′19″W

Information
- Type: Public, Coeducational
- Established: 1964; 62 years ago
- School district: Bellevue School District
- NCES School ID: 530039000078
- Principal: Dion Yahoudy
- Teaching staff: 89.89 (2024–2025)
- Grades: 9–12
- Enrollment: 1,850 (2024–2025)
- Student to teacher ratio: 20.58 (2024–2025)
- Campus: Suburban
- Campus size: 12.71 acres (51,400 m^{2})
- Colors: Scarlet; Gold
- Mascot: Knight
- Nickname: Knights
- Rival: Bellevue Wolverines, Skyline Spartans, Issaquah Eagles
- Newspaper: Knightlife
- Communities served: Somerset, Newport Hills, Newcastle, Factoria, Eastgate, Newport Shores
- Feeder schools: Tyee Middle School, Tillicum Middle School
- Website: newporthigh.bsd405.org

Newport High School (NHS) is a public high school in Bellevue, Washington, United States. It serves students in grades 9–12 in the southern part of the Bellevue School District, including the neighborhoods of Eastgate, Factoria, Newport Hills, Newport Shores, Somerset, The Summit, and Sunset. As of the 2025–26 school year, the principal is Dion Yahoudy. The mascot is the Knight, and the school colors are scarlet and gold.

== History ==
Newport High School was built in 1963 and opened in the fall of 1964 to accommodate Bellevue's growing population. Prior to construction, students in the Eastgate, Somerset and Newport Hills neighborhoods went to Sammamish High School and Bellevue High School. The first graduating class was of 1966.

From 2005 to 2008, the school went through a major construction project. A new three story building replaced the original classrooms, library, and offices. The original buildings remained in use during construction of the new building. The project included extensive remodeling of the gyms and locker rooms. In early 2007, students and teachers moved into the new building. The old buildings were demolished to replace a baseball field and a softball field displaced by the new building. The project cost $54 million.

=== 2021 student demonstration ===
On November 19, 2021, at 10:50 a.m., a walkout protest involving hundreds of students unfolded over the school administration's perceived failure to respond to a sexual harassment allegation. Due to the "substantial" disruption to the education process, which the district considered far exceeding the parameters of its policies concerning the freedom of assembly, the school administration ordered a school-wide lockdown, and law enforcement were called to the site. Multiple student leaders involved with the demonstration were suspended. No injuries were reported.

Bellevue School District interim superintendent Art Jarvis said in a statement, "There is no tolerance for sexual assault or sexual harassment in the policies or practices of the Bellevue school system." Jarvis reiterated that the school district cannot disclose any private information about student disputes and "will continue to investigate any charges or allegation." The statement further condemned drawing premature conclusions without due process.

== Demographics ==
In the 2017–18 school year, the total student enrollment was 1,772. The demographics are: 1% Black/African American, 6% Hispanic, 8% Multi-Ethnic, 48% Asian and 36% White. 35% of students speak a first language other than English. 6% of students receive ELL service, and 13% of students qualify for free/reduced lunch.

== Achievements ==
Newport High School has been ranked in the Top 100 List of Best High Schools by Newsweek Magazine as measured by the number of AP tests taken divided by the number of seniors in the school, ranking 37th as of 2006, 31st as of 2008, 34th in 2009. It was ranked 118 in 2014. Newport was also selected as a Blue Ribbon School of Excellence in 2003 by the United States Department of Education. In 2005 Newport High School's World History program was recognized as exemplary in the College Board's Report To The Nation based on its top-ranking pass rate on the national AP World History exam. Another achievement includes the DECA (Distributive Education Classes of America) program, which is a competition offered through Newport's Marketing Classes.

== Technology ==
During the 2004–2005 school year, the Bellevue School District made a push to buy Smart Boards for all classrooms, accompanied by Dell projectors which are mounted onto the ceiling. In the 2016-17 school year the Bellevue School District decided to hand out Lenovo Yoga laptops known as the One-to-One Technology program. This includes teaching with Microsoft OneNote.

Some of the technology related courses include the NHS Cisco academy, including CCNP classes, and Advanced Placement Computer Science.

One technical class is the advanced video production program. The production studio has a professional level green room, studio cameras, Apple computers for editing, and a fully equipped audio room. The program also has access to cinema grade cameras, however, students in the program are yet to be allowed access.

== Students ==
Newport High School hosts a large variety of clubs, including language/culture clubs in Spanish and Chinese, as well as a branch of the National Honor Society, Gay-Straight Alliance, Debate, Junior Statesmen of America, DECA, Key Club, a community-service organization called ACE, a robotics club, a math club, a snowboarding club called Snow Riders, a sports debating club called Sports Debate Club, a Jewish club, a dancing club called Cover & Choreography, a speech and debate club and Forensics team, and a Spirit Squads like Cheer, Drill, and Color Guard.

Multiple classes are designed to teach students to perform at their personal best, including ASPEN, AVID, leadership and link-crew. Link-crew is a semester-long class for Juniors and Seniors, where everyone is assigned a group of freshmen, and these students help the freshmen adjust to high school life. Leadership is either semester- or year-long, and in this class students (Sophomore standing or above) learn various leadership techniques which they put to use in projects such as Adopt-a-Family, which raises money for local needy families during the holiday season. ASPEN, which stands for AIDS, Student Peer Educators at Newport, is Newport's advanced health class, in which students learn extensively about HIV/AIDS, and then teach other students about STDs, HIV/AIDS, and safe sex practices. In 2009, they raised over $44,000 for Lifelong AIDS Alliance, making them the second biggest contributors only behind Microsoft, and in 2010 they raised over $51,000 easily the largest amount of any team in the walk. AVID (advancement via individual determination) is designed for students who are taking courses the students feel are challenging. This class teaches study skills, and students practice college entrance examinations and essays.

== Music ==
The Newport Jazz Ensemble has competed in the Essentially Ellington Jazz Festival and Competition in New York. The Jazz Ensemble participates in many festivals including Clark College Jazz Festival, Bellevue College Jazz Festival, Lionel Hampton Jazz Festival, and the Swing Central Jazz Festival in Savannah, Georgia, placing second in 2011. Other activities include the KPLU School of Jazz Recording Project and performing at the Paramount Theatre.

The Marching Band performs at home football games, assemblies and parades all across Washington State.

The Newport Orchestra program features a select chamber orchestra for top orchestral instrumentalists. The program won second place at the 2015 ASTA National Music Festival in Salt Lake City and first place at the 2016 National Orchestra Cup in New York City. Newport's Chamber Orchestra received third place in the 2025 American String Teachers Association (ASTA) National Orchestra Festival behind Redmond High School.

== Robotics ==
The Newport Robotics Group, also known as NRG or NRG948, is the official FIRST team of Newport High School. They have been participating in the FIRST Robotics Competition since 2002. They are officially sponsored by The Intuitive Foundation, FIRST Washington, Google, SPEEA, Microsoft, Boeing, the Washington OSPI, Gene Haas Foundation, Harbor Freight Tools for Schools, XTool, Polymaker, Hatchx and the Bellevue Schools Foundation.

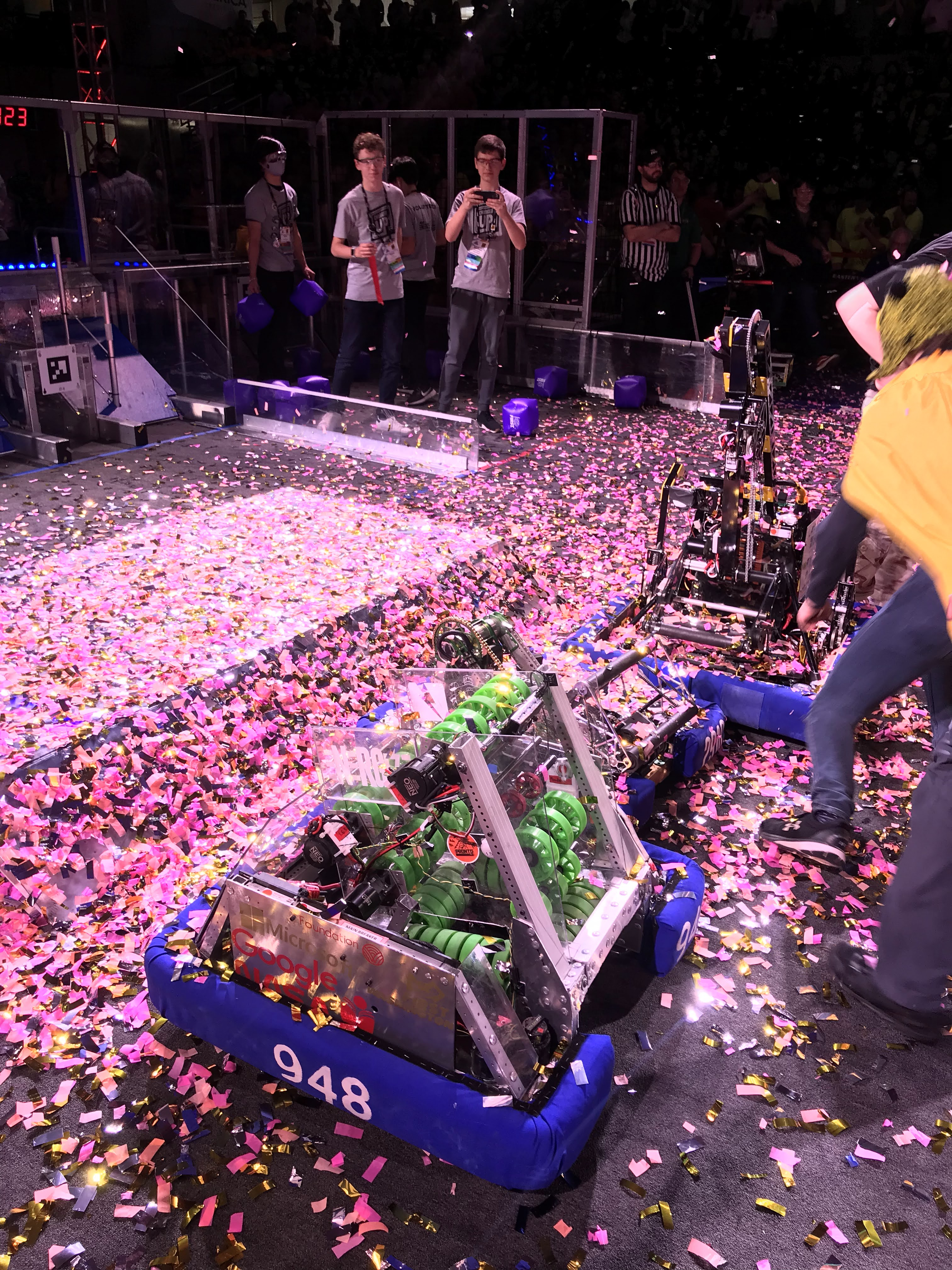
NRG's 2023 Robot "Dodo" shortly after winning the 2023 PNW Championship

NRG's official website is nrg948.com, and NRG's FIRST scouting app, nicknamed LightHouse, is available on the Play Store.

Like the school, NRG uses a knight as its official mascot. However, NRG also represents their brand with a lightning bolt, and their official colors are NRG Red and Knight Gold.

=== 2023 (CHARGED UP) ===
During the 2023 season, NRG was 33-24-0 in official play, placing 22nd in the Pacific Northwest District. They won the Pacific Northwest FIRST District Championship along with teams 1983, 2046, and 2910, advancing them to the FIRST Championship in Houston, Texas. In Houston, they made it to the Galileo Division semifinals before being eliminated.

NRG won a total of 3 sustainability awards this season.

=== 2024 (CRESCENDO) ===
During the 2024 season, NRG was 15-16-0 in official play, placing 59th overall in the Pacific Northwest District. They participated in the Glacier Peak and Sammamish events before being eliminated from further official play. This season, NRG won an Excellence in Engineering award and a Team Sustainability award.

=== 2025 (REEFSCAPE) ===
During the 2025 season, NRG was 30-32-0 in official play, placing 16th overall in the Pacific Northwest District. They were the Pacific Northwest FIRST District Championship finalists with teams 1778 and 9450, advancing them to the FIRST Championship Newton Division before being eliminated from official play.

NRG won an Excellence in Engineering award and a District Engineering Inspiration award this season.

=== 2026 (REBUILT) ===
During the 2026 season, NRG was 44-20-0 in official play, placing 5th in the Pacific Northwest District. They were the Pacific Northwest FIRST District Championship finalists with teams 1540 and 2412, advancing them to the FIRST Championship Newton Division before being eliminated from official play.

NRG won a Quality award and an Excellence in Engineering award this season.

== Math Club ==
Newport's math team placed third and second in the state at the 2009 and 2012 Washington State Mu Alpha Theta contest. Newport Math Club hosts the Knights of Pi Math Tournament for students in grades 5–8.

== Forensics ==
Newport High has had a Debate team since January 10, 1966. The team is affiliated with the National Speech and Debate Association, the national honor society for competitive speech and debate. In 1976, Newport won the Whitman College Invitational, and in 1988, two of the team's policy debate teams broke into the quarterfinal rounds of the California High School Forensics Tournament hosted by the University of California at Berkeley. Newport Debate has qualified to attend the National Championships 18 times since its founding.

In 2009, the club expanded its event offerings to include Individual Event speeches, Public Forum, Oxford- and Congressional-style Debate. By the spring of 2010, Newport was officially recognized by the NFL as a charter chapter after finishing the season ranked 7th nationally among affiliate NFL chapters. Charter status give the club voting membership in the national organization, and allowed the team increased entrants to the National Qualifiers.

== Weekend programs ==
The Northwest Chinese School (simplified Chinese: 西北中文学校; traditional Chinese: 西北中文; pinyin: Xīběi Zhōngwén Xuéxiào), which teaches Chinese, mathematics, and other classes to students aged 4–18, is held at Newport High. It is the largest weekend Chinese school in the United States.

== Notable alumni ==
- Scott Anderson, former Major League Baseball pitcher
- Josh Atencio, MLS player (Seattle Sounders, Colorado Rapids)
- Naomi Bashkansky, World Schools Chess Champion (Girls U13), North American Junior Girls Under 20 Champion, Woman International Master
- Mike Campbell, former MLB player (Seattle Mariners, Texas Rangers, San Diego Padres, Chicago Cubs)
- Hannah Lux Davis, Music Video Director
- Steve Gajkowski, former MLB player (Seattle Mariners)
- India Gants, winner of 2017 America's Next Top Model
- Marcus Hahnemann, former goalkeeper for Seattle Sounders FC
- Chip Hanauer, World Champion hydroplane driver
- Martin Harrison, NFL player 1990–1999; University of Washington 1985–1990
- Jo Harshbarger, 1972 Olympic Swim Team, set four world records - 800 Free (1972),1500 Free (1973) and 800 Free (1974 twice)
- Todd Hollandsworth, former Major League Baseball outfielder, 1996 National League Rookie of the Year
- Megan Lee (chess player), Washington State Champion, U.S. Women's Open winner, North American Youth U18 Girls Champion, Woman International Master
- Richard H. Lee, professional golfer on PGA Tour
- Rommie Lewis, former Major League Baseball pitcher for the Toronto Blue Jays
- Peter Line, professional snowboarder, co-founder Forum Snowboarding
- Anna Mastro, film, television, music video director
- Anna Mickelson, 2008 Beijing Olympic gold medalist (rowing)
- Cliff Pastornicky, former Major League Baseball infielder for the Kansas City Royals
- Erik Plantenberg, former Major League Baseball pitcher
- Mark Pope, former National Basketball Association forward, head men's basketball coach at the University of Kentucky
- Jeff Probst, host of Survivor
- Ron Romanick, former Major League Baseball pitcher with California Angels
- Drew Sample, NFL tight end
- Jackson Slater, NFL offensive guard for the Tennessee Titans
- John Stanton, Owner and CEO of Seattle Mariners Major League Baseball Team
- Jeff Stewart, former MLS player with Colorado Rapids
- Jeremy Taiwo, world record high-jumper in heptathlon
- Uğur Taner, 1992 and 2000 Summer Olympics competitor in swimming
- Calvin Throckmorton, NFL offensive guard for the Denver Broncos
- Dale Turner, singer-songwriter, multi-instrumentalist, producer/arranger
- Steve Wiebe, classic arcade coin-op world record holder and subject of documentary film The King of Kong
- David Wu, Chinese American film actor and former MTV Asia VJ
