= Eastgate, Bellevue =

Eastgate
- Neighborhood
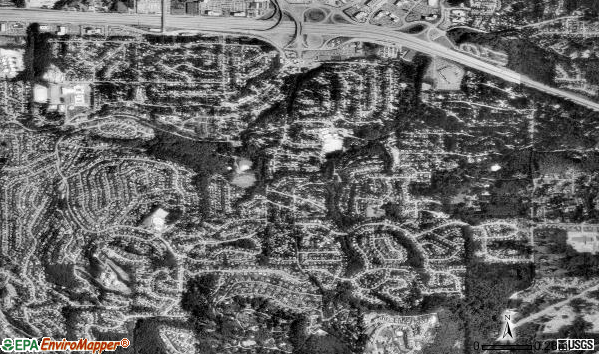
- Aerial view of Eastgate

- Location of Eastgate, Washington

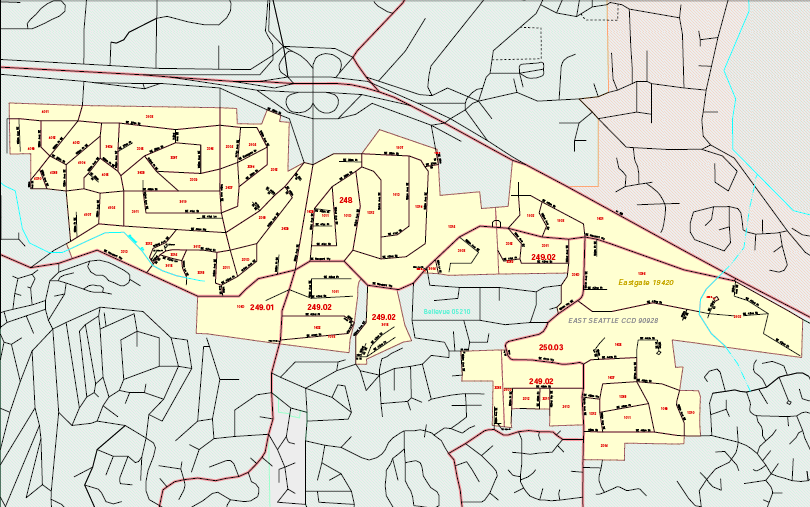
- Map of Eastgate, Washington
- Coordinates: 47°34′19″N 122°08′19″W
- Country: United States
- State: Washington
- County: King
- City: Bellevue
- Established: 1954

Government
  - Type: Annexed in June, 2012

Area
  - Total: 1.2 sq mi (3.0 km^{2})
  - Land: 1.2 sq mi (3.0 km^{2})
  - Water: 0 sq mi (0 km^{2})
- Elevation: 400 ft (122 m)

Population (2010 Census)
  - Total: 4,958
  - Density: 3,617/sq mi (1,396.7/km^{2})
- Time zone: UTC−8 (Pacific)
  - Summer (DST): UTC−7 (Pacific)
- ZIP code: 98006
- Area code: 425
- FIPS code: 53-19420
- GNIS feature ID: 1512174

Eastgate is a neighborhood of Bellevue, Washington, United States. The population was 4,958 at the 2010 census. It was annexed by Bellevue in 2012.

Based on per capita income, one of the more reliable measures of affluence, Eastgate ranked 38th of 522 areas in the state of Washington.

== Geography ==
Eastgate is located at 47°34′19″N 122°8′19″W (47.572005, -122.138509) and is a residential neighborhood of Bellevue.

Eastgate is located south of exit 11-A along I-90, which runs east-west along Eastgate's north side. Issaquah is to the east along I-90, and I-405 is a short distance to the west. Much of Eastgate is on the northwest flank of Cougar Mountain. Immediately to the west is Factoria. Immediately to the south is Somerset. To the north is the I-90 Corridor. According to the United States Census Bureau, the CDP has a total area of 1.3 square miles (3.3 km^{2}), all of it land.

== Economy ==
Eastgate is nearly completely residential. Eastgate lies within the boundaries of the Bellevue and Issaquah School Districts.

== Demographics ==
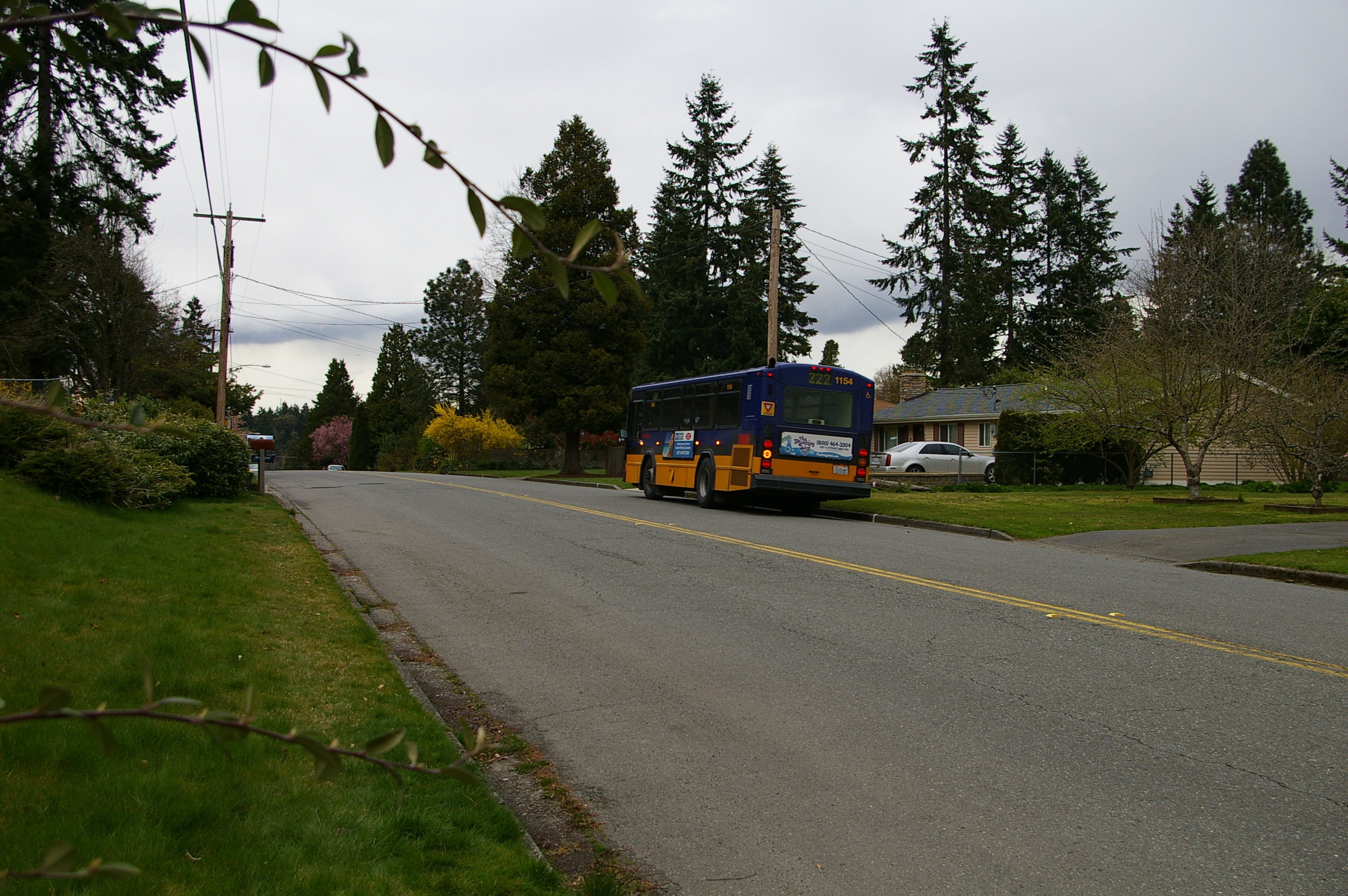

As of the census of 2000, there were 4,558 people, 1,708 households, and 1,233 families residing in the CDP. The population density was 3,629.7 people per square mile (1,396.7/km^{2}). There were 1,743 housing units at an average density of 1,388.0/sq mi (534.1/km^{2}). The racial makeup of the CDP was 83.11% White, 1.62% African American, 0.57% Native American, 9.68% Asian, 0.35% Pacific Islander, 1.97% from other races, and 2.70% from two or more races. Hispanic or Latino of any race were 4.45% of the population.

There were 1,708 households, out of which 32.4% had children under the age of 18 living with them, 59.2% were married couples living together, 8.5% had a female householder with no husband present, and 27.8% were non-families. 18.7% of all households were made up of individuals, and 4.9% had someone living alone who was 65 years of age or older. The average household size was 2.66 and the average family size was 3.04.

In the CDP, the population was spread out, with 23.9% under the age of 18, 6.9% from 18 to 24, 34.9% from 25 to 44, 23.2% from 45 to 64, and 11.1% who were 65 years of age or older. The median age was 37 years. For every 100 females, there were 104.2 males. For every 100 females age 18 and over, there were 103.6 males.

The median income for a household in the CDP was $65,598, and the median income for a family was $67,288. Males had a median income of $52,090 versus $37,547 for females. The per capita income for the CDP was $29,878. About 0.8% of families and 3.4% of the population were below the poverty line, including 3.6% of those under age 18 and 2.0% of those age 65 or over.

== Schools ==
Eastgate is served by two school districts - School District 405 Bellevue which includes Somerset Elementary, Eastgate Elementary, Puesta Del Sol Elementary, Tyee Middle School, Tillicum Middle School and Newport High School, and School District 411 Issaquah which includes Sunset Elementary and Cougar Ridge Elementary.

== Bus routes ==
Eastgate is served by the following King County Metro bus routes: 241 and 271.

== Politics ==
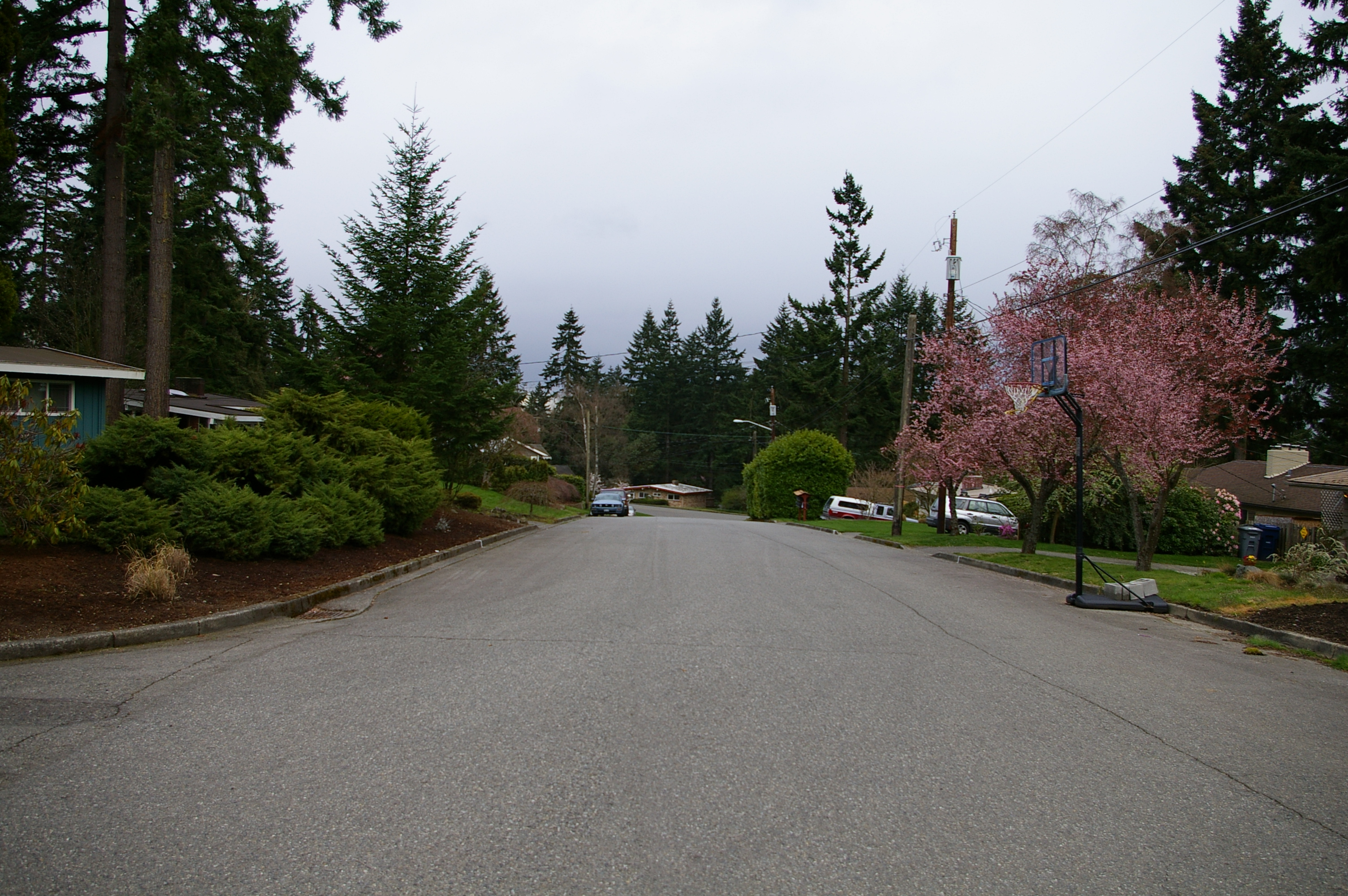

Eastgate is in the 41st Legislative District and has the following precincts: Allen, Vivian, Martha, Horizon, Roanoke, and Eastmont, and is in the 8th Congressional district. It's in the 6th King County Council district.

=== National elections ===
On the national level, Eastgate is a stronghold for the Democratic Party. In 2004, Democrat John Kerry received just under 60 percent of the area's vote, while Republican George W. Bush came in just short of 39 percent.

=== Annexation initiative ===
Eastgate has tried to get annexed by Bellevue several times in the past. In 1990, the area citizens voted to annex to the city of Bellevue and won by a majority. On the same ballot there was an additional vote for Eastgate accepting a portion of Bellevue's bonded indebtedness. The area's voters rejected that measure. As a result, Bellevue chose not to incorporate Eastgate at that time. Then in 2002, the state Supreme Court decision threw out the main method cities have used for decades to expand. In addition, budget implications further postponed annexation of Eastgate with hopes of trying again in a year or two. According to the 2004's Bellevue's Comprehensive plan, it is a policy to annex all land in the Potential Annexation Area expeditiously. Discussions with Bellevue have been aided by the county's agreement to give the city Coal Creek Park and the Surrey Downs district court property. The city projected an operating deficit of $300,000. Later in November of the same year, a budget was proposed to develop urban design and development alternatives for the Eastgate area and to conduct the first major update of the Eastgate Subarea Plan in 14 years. The Mayor of Bellevue suggested working toward annexation of the remaining unincorporated portion of the Eastgate area and making an effort to update the subarea plan. He also asked staff to develop a cost estimate for annexing Eastgate. The neighborhoods of Eastgate, Tamara Hills, and Horizon View were annexed by the City of Bellevue on June 1, 2012, adding "about 5,400 new residents, 1,850 residences and 700 acres" to Bellevue.

== See also ==
- Bellevue, Washington
- King County, Washington
