= Sammamish High School =

Public school in Bellevue, Washington, US

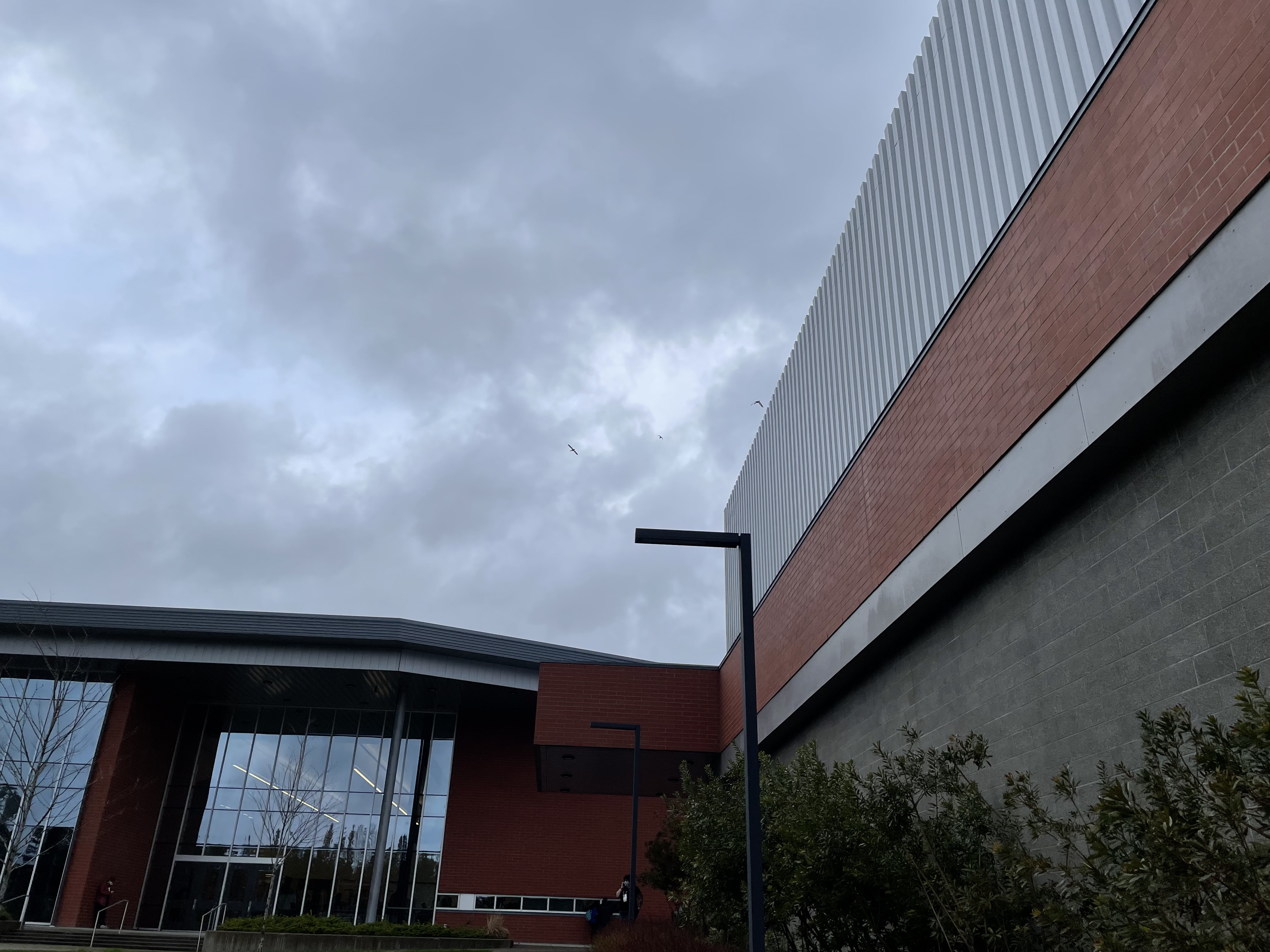

Location
- 100 140th Ave. SE; Bellevue, Washington 98005; United States; 47°36′29″N 122°09′07″W

Information
- Type: Public high school
- Established: 1959; 67 years ago (renovated: 2004; 22 years ago; rebuilt: 2017; 9 years ago)
- School district: Bellevue School District
- NCES School ID: 530039000085
- Principal: Drew Thomas
- Teaching staff: 62.00 (FTE))
- Grades: 9–12
- Enrollment: 1,363 (2024-2025)
- Student to teacher ratio: 21.98
- Colors: Red; Black; White
- Athletics: WIAA Class 2A, SeaKing District Two
- Athletics conference: KingCo 2A
- Mascot: Hawk
- Nickname: Redhawks
- Rivals: Interlake
- Newspaper: Redhawk Talk
- Yearbook: Redhawks
- Website: sammamishhigh.bsd405.org

Sammamish High School (commonly Sammamish or SHS) is a public secondary school in Bellevue, Washington, United States, serving students in grades 9–12. Opened in 1959, the school was the second of the four traditional high schools in the Bellevue School District, with admission based primarily on the locations of students' homes. The school was entirely rebuilt over two renovations completed, respectively, in 2004 and 2017. The school's nickname is the Redhawks, the mascot is the Bird, and its colors are red, black, and white.

Sammamish generally serves students from the east zone of the district, but students from outside its attendance area can enroll at the school through its open enrollment policy. Sammamish High's feeder elementary schools are Cherry Crest, Stevenson, Lake Hills, Phantom Lake, and Spiritridge. Its feeder middle schools are Odle and Tillicum.

== Demographics ==
In the 2017–18 school year, the total student enrollment was 1,105. The racial demographics are: 6% Black/African American, 21% Asian, 19% Hispanic, 7% Multi-Ethnic, 46% white, and less than 1% American Indian, Alaska native, Native Hawaiian, and Pacific Islander. 36% qualify for free or reduced lunches. 33% of students speak a first language other than English.

== Academics ==
Sammamish is well known for its magnet programs (Sammamish Visual and Performing Arts Center), Advanced Placement classes, and career and technical programs (commonly referred to as CTE classes) Sammamish was named the Washington state recipient of 2006–07 Siemens Awards of Advanced Placement. This award recognizes the excellence of Sammamish's Advanced Placement instruction and student performances.

Starting with the 2007–08 academic year, Sammamish switched from a 4-period daily block schedule to a 7-period schedule. Then-principal Laura Bang-Knudsen and Program Delivery Council Facilitator George Westergaard cited the need for a waiver, lack of sufficient faculty, parent or student support to get the waiver and inability to come up with a schedule that would not require a waiver and would not sacrifice curriculum coverage time.

During the 2022-23 academic year, Sammamish administration announced plans to implement a phone locker system to decrease distractions in the classroom and increase academic achievements. This has been widely criticized as ridiculous and completely stupid by less than 200 of students who responded a survey.

=== Advanced Placement ===

Sammamish offers Advanced Placement classes. 9th graders are required to take AP Human Geography. From 2002 through 2006, Sammamish students' scores counted for over 50% of all the passing exams in AP Calculus BC for the entire state.

Sammamish was ranked as #168 in 2008, #108 in 2007, #193 in 2006, #225 in 2005, and #141 in 2003 out of all the high schools in United States by Newsweek Magazine. The ranking is based on the number of Advanced Placement and/or International Baccalaureate tests taken divided by number of graduating seniors. All five high schools in the district are consistently ranked as the top five high schools in Washington state since the inception of the Newsweek ranking. The validity of these rankings is disputed for various reasons, such as that Sammamish's lack of an IB program deflates its rating as compared to its neighbor Interlake High School.

== Athletics ==
Sammamish is a member of the Kingco Athletic Conference, in WIAA Class 2A (formerly 3A and 4A). Twenty-two sports are played over the course of three seasons at Sammamish, with cheer and drill active year-round. Past statistics can be found at the WIAA website.

Sammamish High School State Championship Games; WIAA State Tournament History, inquire by selecting Sammamish HS
Year	Sport	Winning Team		Losing Team		Location (all in Washington)	Class
1964	Boys' Golf	Everett	310	Sammamish	294		4A
1970	State Frisbee Championship	Sammamish	3 gms	O'Dea (Seattle)	2 gms	Bellevue	4A
1976	Girls' Basketball	Sammamish	45	Walla Walla	34	Pacific Lutheran University	4A
1977	Girls' Basketball	Sammamish	53	Garfield	30	Pacific Lutheran University	4A
1977	Girls' Track and Field	Sammamish	64	Roosevelt	56		4A
1978	Boys' Basketball	Garfield	58	Sammamish	56	Seattle Coliseum, Seattle	4A
1978	Boys' Soccer	Shorewood	2	Sammamish	0	Seattle	4A
1978	Girls' Track and Field	Sammamish	55	Roosevelt	26		4A
1978	Girls' Cross Country	Bellarmine Prep	106	Sammamish	80		4A
1979	Boys' Soccer	Sammamish	6	O'Dea	2	Seattle	4A
1979	Girls' Track and Field	Sammamish	44	Lincoln (Tacoma)	38		4A
1981	Boys' Soccer	Highline	2	Sammamish	0	Seattle	4A
1985	Boys' Cross Country	Redmond	111	Sammamish	51		4A
1989	Girls' Tennis	Sammamish	tie-breaker	Bellarmine Prep			4A
1989	Girls' Soccer	Jefferson	3	Sammamish	1	Renton	4A
1990	Girls' Tennis	Sammamish	tie-breaker	Bellarmine Prep			4A
1990	Girls' Track and Field	Sammamish	74	Lake Washington	54		4A
1990	Girls' Soccer	Sammamish	1	Federal Way	0	Shoreline	4A
1992	Girls' Soccer	Federal Way	3	Sammamish	0	Shoreline	4A
1995	Boys' Basketball	Evergreen	64	Sammamish	59 (OT)	Kingdome, Seattle	4A
1996	Girls' Tennis	Sammamish					4A
1999	Boys' Football	Prosser	42	Sammamish	38	Tacoma Dome	3A
1999	Boys' Water Polo	Sammamish	11	Mercer Island	10	King County Aquatics Center	3A
2000	Boys' Water Polo	Mercer Island	16	Sammamish	8	King County Aquatics Center	3A
2002	Drill Team	Sammamish	S			Sun Dome, Yakima	3A
2015	Boys Golf	Sammamish				Liberty Lake Golf Course	2A
2020	Boys Swim and Dive	Sammamish				King County Aquatic Center	2A
2020	Girls Gymnastics	Lake Washington		Sammamish		Sammamish High School	3A

This list only includes school championship games and does not include the 55 individual and group first place championships and 11 second-place finishes in track and field, cross country, swimming, golf, gymnastics, tennis, and wrestling.

== Activities ==
Sammamish High School is home to a variety of extracurricular activities. Associated Student Body and administrators coordinate these throughout the schoolyear. Academically, the school houses chapters of the National Honor Society, National Arts Honor Society, Tri-M (Music Honor Society), Mu Alpha Theta (National Math Honor Society), and as of the 2006–07 school year, a successful and competitive Policy/Lincoln Douglas Debate team, which has competed at the semi-final level of the Auburn Regional Forensics Invitational.

An active Multicultural Club conducts events to demonstrate the diversity of the student body and coordinates the annual "Taste of Sammamish" culinary festival. Also, the Arts Magnet Program creates opportunities for students to participate in actual production. In addition, its Art Club has earned it the reputation as the art school of the Bellevue school district through the dismemberment of a bee. Other clubs include the Black Student Union and the LGBTQ club. Sammamish is home to Thespian Troupe 2241. The school's theater opened early in 2005 and cost the district $4.5 million. It is now home to at least two student productions each year. The theater contains professional equipment and is sometimes available to outside groups for rent, making it the third professional-quality theater in King County, Washington.

Sammamish Graphic Arts students often participate in state and regional graphics competitions. The school offers a fully functional hot glass studio and extensive programs centered on Health care. The jazz choir has won numerous awards, and along with jazz band competes in the Lionel Hampton Jazz Festival each year. Jazz choir was recently featured in Bellevue Community College's Vocal Jazz Invitational with its award-winning vocal jazz ensemble Celebration!. In February 2007, Sammamish won 1st Runner-up in the most competitive Multi-Mic Division at Lionel Hampton Jazz Festival. Sammamish also houses a FIRST Robotics Competition team, and a FIRST Tech Challenge team, 2412 (Robototes), and 16750 (Technototes) respectively. In April 2022, Sammamish students won the 2022 WSU Business Plan Competition with their pillow company, Perfect Pillow.

== Notable alumni ==
- Chance Fry, professional soccer player
- Megan Hilty, Tony nominated Broadway actress (attended Sammamish, but later transferred to the Washington Academy of Performing Arts in Redmond and later the Chrysalis School in Woodinville)
- Linea Johnson, author of Perfect Chaos and mental health advocate
- John LeRoy, professional baseball player (1997)
- Dayyan Eng, award-winning film director, attended in his sophomore and junior year.
- Rob McKenna, Attorney General of Washington (2005–2013)
- Carol Sealey, Canadian Olympic basketball player
- Ann Wilson, musician, co-founder of Heart
