= Naomi Bashkansky =

American chess player (born 2003)

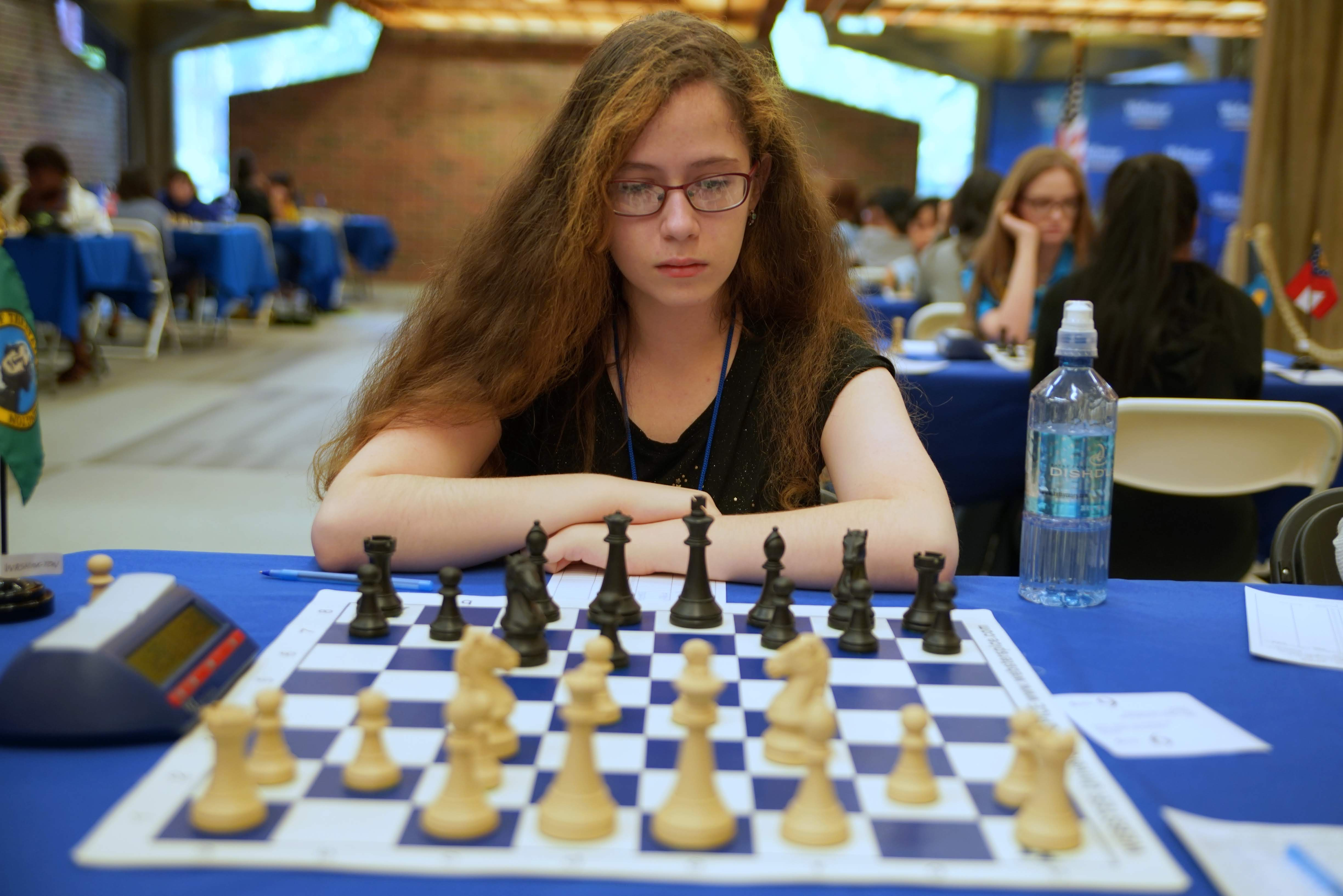

Personal information
- Born: 2003 (age 22–23)

Chess career
- Country: United States
- Title: Woman International Master (2017)
- Peak rating: 2095 (May 2018)

Naomi Bashkansky (born 2003), is an American chess player, a World Schools Chess Champion (Girls U13), a North American Junior Girls Under 20 Champion, and a Woman International Master. She currently works in the artificial intelligence field.

== Education ==
Bashkansky graduated from Odle Middle School in 2017, from Newport High School (Bellevue, Washington) in 2021, and from 2021 to 2024 was pursuing a concurrent bachelor's and master's degree in Computer Science at Harvard University.

== Chess career ==
Bashkansky won first place in the 2016 World Schools Chess Championship in Sochi, and became the 2017 North American Junior Girls Under 20 Champion in Dallas, Texas.

Bashkansky won the US All-Girls National Chess Championships U10 (in 2013) and U12 (in 2015). She tied for first place in the 2013 Pan-American Youth Chess Championship in Brazil, in the Girls U10 category. In 2018 Bashkansky won the North American All Girls Championship.

== Professional career ==
She worked at OpenAI from January 2025 to June 2026. She joined Conduit Intelligence, a company that describes itself as a "thought-to-text startup", in July 2026.
