= Martin Harrison (American football) =

American football player (born 1967)

No. 57, 56, 91, 92, 95
- Positions: Defensive end, linebacker

Personal information
- Born: September 20, 1967 (age 59); Livermore, California, U.S.
- Listed height: 6 ft 5 in (1.96 m)
- Listed weight: 258 lb (117 kg)

Career information
- High school: Bellevue (WA) Newport
- College: Washington
- NFL draft: 1990: 10th round, 276th overall pick

Career history
- San Francisco 49ers (1990–1993); Minnesota Vikings (1994–1996); Seattle Seahawks (1997); Denver Broncos (1998)*; Chicago Bears (1998)*; Minnesota Vikings (1999)
- * Offseason or practice squad member only

Career NFL statistics
- Tackles: 90
- Sacks: 21
- Forced fumbles: 3
- Stats at Pro Football Reference

Martin Allen Harrison (born September 20, 1967) is an American former professional football player who was a defensive end for 10 seasons in the National Football League (NFL) with the San Francisco 49ers, the Minnesota Vikings, and the Seattle Seahawks. He played college football for the Washington Huskies. Harrison attended Newport High School in Bellevue, Washington and was a multiple letter winner in both football and track and field. In 1983, when he was 15 years old, he placed sixth in the national AAU Junior Olympics in the decathlon.

He received a Bachelor of Arts degree from the University of Washington.

== College ==
=== University of Washington (1985–1990) ===
==== Honors, awards, and highlights ====
- Sophomore, Honorable Mention All-American Team – The Sporting News.
- Three-year starter.
- Co-captain in 1989. Defensive Lineman Of The Year in 1989.
- Senior year- received league honors "Honorable Mention" as outside linebacker behind Junior Seau and Carnell Lake, both first round NFL draft picks.
- 4 quarterback sacks vs Oregon, 5 tackles for loss vs. Washington State University, 21 tackles for loss during the 1989 season.
- 38 career tackles for loss, 275 career tackles, and 34 career starts.

== NFL career ==
=== San Francisco 49ers (1990–1993) ===
In 1990, Harrison made the 49ers as a tenth round draft pick (276th overall). That year the team finished the season with a 14–2 regular season record. Because of injury, he saw limited action. In 1991 Harrison was released on the final cut then re-signed the next day to the practice squad, where he spent the entire season. However, in the next two years, he played in 27 games, starting two of them.

While with the 49ers Harrison made it to the National Football Conference championship game three times, in 1990, 1992 and 1993. However, the team lost each year, once to the New York Giants (1990) and twice to the Dallas Cowboys (1992 and 1993).

He finished his tenure with the 49ers with a total of 9.5 sacks, 2 forced fumbles, and 39 tackles.

=== Minnesota Vikings (1994–1996) ===
==== 1994–1995 ====
At age 27, Harrison switched teams in hopes of getting more playing time. In his first season with the Vikings he played in 13 games, mostly on special teams. Harrison had more playing time and made a bigger impact the next season, getting to the quarterback 4.5 times, making 10 tackles and getting his only career interception, which he returned for ten yards.

==== 1996 ====
Harrison was named the starter at right defensive end in 1996. He managed his best season statistically, racking up 7 sacks and 21 tackles while starting in only 8 games.

=== Minnesota Vikings (1999) ===
Harrison spent his last year in the NFL with the Minnesota Vikings in 1999. Due to a knee injury, he did not see much action that year, playing in only four games.

=== Career highlights ===
He completed his career with a total of 21 sacks, 1 interception, 3 forced fumbles, 1 fumble recovered and 90 tackles – 77 unassisted and 13 assisted.

=== NFL Statistics ===
Martin Harrison career defensive statistics
Year	Age	Team	GP	GS	Sacks	FF	TK	INT
1990	23	SFO	2	0	0	0	4	0
1991	24	SFO*	0	0	0	0	0	0
1992	25	SFO	16	1	3.5	0	12	0
1993	26	SFO	11	1	6	2	23	0
1994	27	MIN	13	0	0	0	2	0
1995	28	MIN	11	0	4.5	0	10	1
1996	29	MIN	16	8	7	1	21	0
1997	30	SEA	8	0	0	0	3	0
1999	32	MIN	4	0	0	0	2	0
Career			81	10	21	3	77	1

Key:(GP) games played - (GS) games started - (FF) forced fumbles - (TK) tackles - (INT) interceptions

- 1991 SFO practice squad

== See also ==
- Washington Huskies football statistical leaders
