= Frank Church High School =

Location
- 8051 West Salt Creek Court; Boise, Idaho 83709; United States; 43.5708°N 116.2827°W

Information
- Type: Alternative
- Established: 2008
- School district: Boise
- Principal: Savannah Thompson
- Faculty: 42.34 (FTE)
- Grades: 9–12
- Enrollment: 386 (2023-2024)
- Student to teacher ratio: 9.12
- Colors: Maroon and Black
- Mascot: Cougar
- Newspaper: The Cougar Chronicles
- Website: Frank Church H.S.

Frank Church High School is an alternative public secondary school in Boise, Idaho, operated by the Boise School District. Opened in 2008, it was formed from the merger of Mountain Cove High School and Fort Boise Mid High School. It serves grades 9–12, with the majority of the enrollment in the upper grades.

FCHS is named after Frank Church, a prominent U.S. Senator from 1957 to 1981, and an alumnus of Boise High School, class of 1942. The school is located in southwest Boise, immediately east of the new West Junior High School, also opened in 2008. FCHS also hosts the Boise Evening School program and B.A.S.E (Boise Alternative to Suspension and Expulsion) formerly known as the Victory Academy.

== Principals ==
- In 2008–2009, the principal was Robert Thompson.
- In 2010–2011 the principal was former vice principal Cedric Minter.
- In 2019–2020, the principal was Nathan Dennis.
