= Brian Wood (journalist) =

American journalist

- Education: University of Washington
- Occupation: Journalist
- Television: KATU (2008–2021); WMAR-TV (2002–2008); KIRO-TV (1982–2001); KLAS-TV (1981–1982)

Brian Wood is an American journalist. He has spent most of his career working for news outlets in the Pacific Northwest of the United States.

== Early life ==
Wood grew up in Bellevue, Washington, and attended Interlake High School, before graduating from the University of Washington with an honors degree in Political Science and Communications.

== Journalism career ==
He shared the 1992 Peabody Award for reporting the documentary When the Salmon Runs Dry which explored the causes and effects of the declining population of wild salmon in the Columbia River system.

His work during the 1998 Olympics in Nagano, Japan was featured in The Seattle Times.

Wood's live reporting as the 2001 Nisqually earthquake hit Seattle on February 28, was broadcast internationally.

Wood was an anchor and reporter for KATU (TV) in Portland, Oregon. From 2002 to 2008 he was the main anchor and managing editor at WMAR-TV in Baltimore, Maryland.

He has also anchored and reported at KIRO-TV in Seattle, Washington, and KLAS-TV in Las Vegas, Nevada.

=== Awards and recognition ===
Wood has earned four Emmy awards and several AP and Society of Professional Journalists awards for his reporting on, among other subjects, the Green River Killer, the deadly immigrant smuggling on container ships from Hong Kong and the sinking of the Interstate 90 floating bridge in November 1990.
