= Winston Churchill Middle School =

Middle school in California

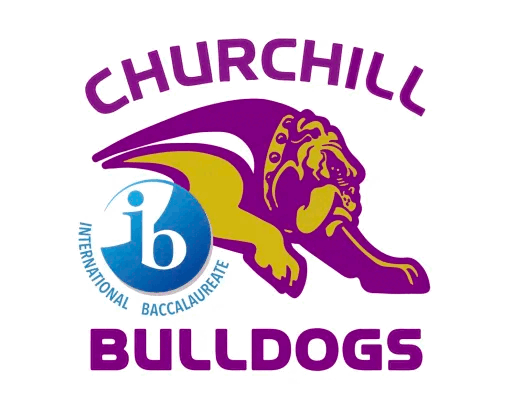

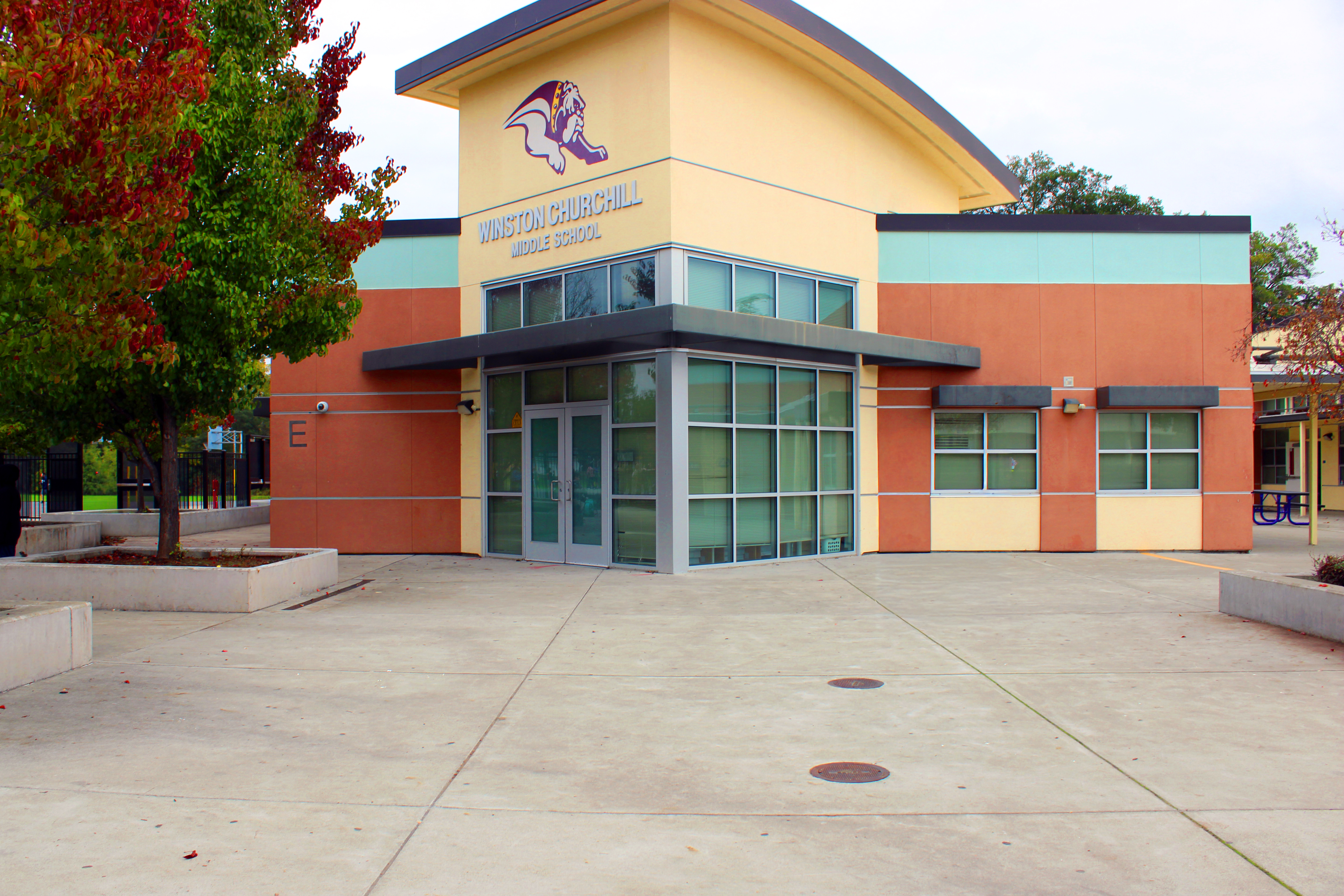

Location
- 4900 Whitney Ave; Carmichael, California 95608; United States; 38°37′36″N 121°21′04″W

Information
- Established: 1963
- School district: San Juan Unified School District
- Grades: 6–8
- Enrollment: 987 (2023–2024)
- Student to teacher ratio: 21.69
- Colors: Purple & Gold
- Mascot: Bulldogs
- Newspaper: www.youtube.com/@Bulldogtelevisionwcms/
- Website: churchill.sanjuan.edu

Winston Churchill Middle School is a public middle school located in Carmichael, California, United States. It is part of the San Juan Unified School District and serves students in grades 6 through 8.

The school is named after former British Prime Minister Winston Churchill. Winston Churchill Middle School is recognized regionally for its academic competition programs, particularly Science Bowl and Quiz Bowl.

== History ==
Winston Churchill Middle School opened in 1963 as part of the postwar expansion of schools within the San Juan Unified School District. The school was constructed to serve the growing suburban population of Carmichael and surrounding communities in Sacramento County.

Over the decades, the campus has undergone renovations and modernization projects, including classroom technology upgrades and improvements to athletic and student facilities.

== Education ==
Winston Churchill Middle School follows the curriculum standards established by the California Department of Education and the San Juan Unified School District. Core subjects include mathematics, science, English language arts, and social studies.

The school also offers elective courses including visual arts, music, computer applications, leadership, and physical education. Advanced and accelerated mathematics courses are available for eligible students preparing for high school honors coursework.

== Students ==
Winston Churchill Middle School serves students primarily from Carmichael and neighboring communities within the San Juan Unified attendance area.

=== Demographics ===
Race/Ethnicity	Percentage
White	39%
Hispanic	29%
Asian	14%
Black	8%
Two or More Races	7%
Other	3%

== Extracurricular activities ==
Winston Churchill Middle School offers a variety of extracurricular activities and student organizations, including leadership programs, music ensembles, robotics, and academic clubs.

=== Academic competition ===
The school's academic competition programs are among the most recognized middle school activities in the Sacramento region.

The Winston Churchill National Science Bowl team has participated in regional competitions hosted by the United States Department of Energy.

Churchill is also known for its Quiz Bowl program. The school's teams have competed in regional and national academic tournaments, including events organized by National Academic Quiz Tournaments (NAQT) and the Middle School National Championship Tournament (MSNCT). The Winston Churchill National Science Bowl team placed third at the national competition in both 2025 and 2026, qualifying among the top middle school teams in the country.. The Quiz Bowl team won first place at MSNCT in 2021.. Students in both programs compete in buzzer-based academic matches covering science, mathematics, literature, history, geography, and current events.

The Winston Churchill Science Olympiad team competes annually in regional tournaments, participating in events ranging from biology and chemistry to engineering and physics-based challenges.

=== Music and arts ===
The school maintains band, choir, and visual arts programs that participate in district performances and community events.

=== Leadership ===
Associated Student Body (ASB) students organize rallies, dances, spirit weeks, and campus activities throughout the school year.

== Athletics ==
Winston Churchill Middle School participates in middle school athletics within the San Juan Unified School District. Sports programs have included basketball, volleyball, soccer, cross country, and track and field.

School athletic teams compete under the Bulldogs mascot and the school colors of purple and gold.

== Campus ==
The Winston Churchill Middle School campus includes classroom buildings, science laboratories, a library, a gymnasium, athletic fields, and multipurpose facilities used for assemblies and student activities.

The campus is located near the intersection of Whitney Avenue and Mission Avenue in Carmichael, California.
