= Megan Lee (chess player) =

American chess player (born 1996)

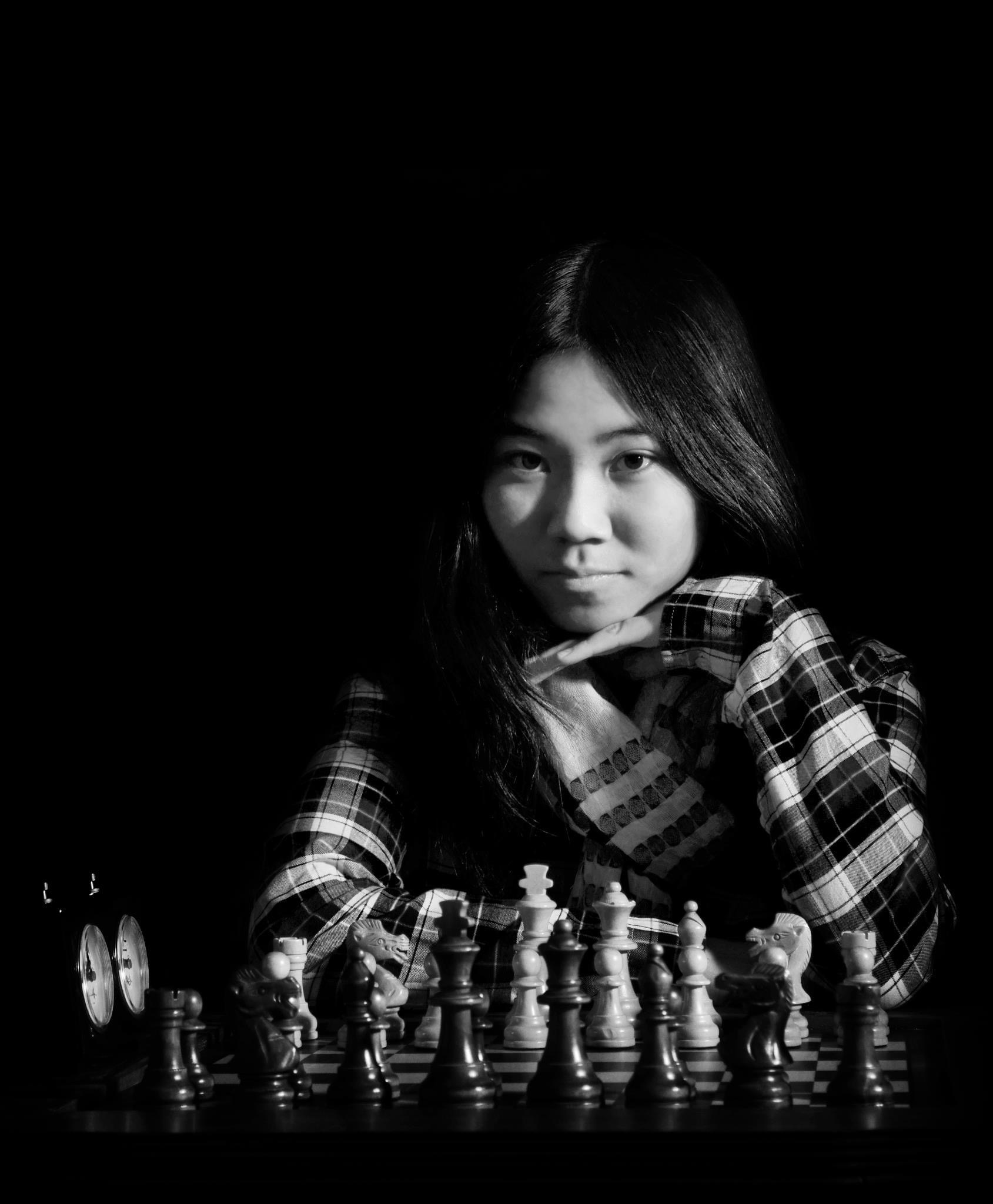

Personal information
- Born: July 13, 1996 (age 29) Bellevue, Washington

Chess career
- Country: United States
- Title: FIDE Master (2024); Woman International Master (2013)
- Peak rating: 2297 (June 2024)

Megan Lee is an American chess Woman International Master. She won the Washington State Championship in 2020 and 2022, and the 2019 U.S. Women's Open. Previously, Lee won the 2013 North American Youth U18 Girls Championship and the 2009 Kasparov All-Girls Nationals Championship.

She graduated from Newport High School (Bellevue, Washington), having led its chess team to win the 2014 Washington High School State Team Championship. Lee completed her BFA in Industrial Design at the Rhode Island School of Design with a minor in Art History. Outside of chess, she runs two small businesses, an embroidery shop and a lifestyle brand, Snippet Studios.

== Chess career ==
Megan tied for 10th place at the 2021 US Women's Chess Championship with a score of 4/11 points. In 2022, she tied for 5th place at the US Women's Chess Championship with a score of 7/13 points. In 2024, she achieved clear 4th place at the US Women's Chess Championship after breaking Carissa Yip's 8 game winning streak in the tournament.
