= Factoria, Bellevue =

Neighborhood in Washington, US

Coordinates: 47°34′34″N 122°10′08″W

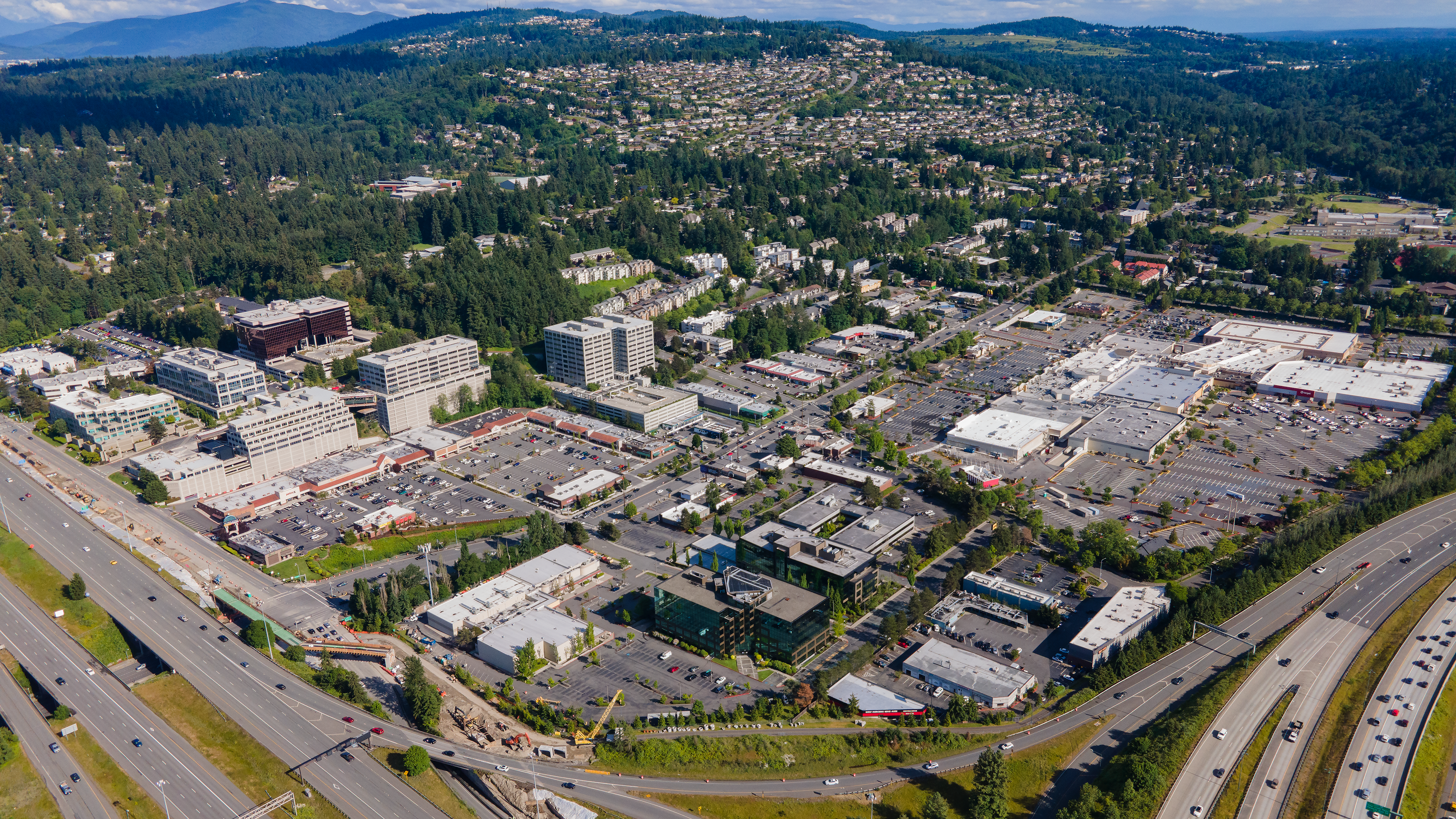
T-Mobile US headquarters (left), Somerset (distant middle), The Marketplace at Factoria (right)

Factoria is a mixed-use suburban neighborhood in south Bellevue, Washington and is one of the city's significant commercial districts. Originally timberland from the 1890s to 1920s and later envisioned as an industrial center, Factoria has since the 1960s evolved into commercial and residential development. Factoria was annexed into Bellevue in 1993. The core neighborhood is bounded by Interstate 90 to the north, Interstate 405 to the west, Newport Way to the east, and Coal Creek Parkway to the south.

== History ==
Factoria is part of the Duwamish Tribal Territory. "During the 1890s, loggers cut large stands of timber on land now known as Woodridge Hill, Richards Valley, Greenwich Crest, Mockingbird Hill, Monthaven, Newport Shores, and the commercial area of Factoria."

In the late 1890s, the Northern Pacific Railway laid tracks through the largely uninhabited area along the shores of Lake Washington near Mercer Island. In the early 1900s a large industrial center was envisioned by a group of Seattle investors led by E. L. Skeel on what is now the interchange of Interstate 405 and I-90. In 1908 Skeel formed the Mercer Land Company and platted several blocks adjoining the railroad tracks. The new community was to be named Mercer. A stove factory was constructed at the town-site but never manufactured a single stove. By 1911, development of the community was at a standstill and the company, now run by a Sarah Kendall with Skeel as secretary, filed a new plat featuring more blocks and public space. The project was now called Factoria, a name that would hopefully attract major industries, which it never did.

According to, Factoria

was promoted as an industrial center with coal smoke "belching from hundreds of smokestacks." Promoters expected at least 20 plants, in addition to the existing Factoria Stove and Range Co., to locate there. But some 15 years after the promoter’s pitch, only the Factoria School had been built and the proposed industrial town of Factoria never got off the ground. The present day Factoria Mall is located on the original Factoria property.

In the late 1920s Factoria became the headquarters for the burgeoning rabbit industry on the East Side. In 1927, an abandoned local factory was converted into a processing plant for canned rabbit meat and fur as well as a marketing headquarters for the industry. In 1939, construction began on a new $800,000 highway project that straightened out the Sunset Highway between Issaquah and Mercer Island and eventually led to the construction of the Lacey V. Murrow Memorial Bridge across Lake Washington. The new four-lane highway passed directly through Factoria and intersected with Lake Washington Boulevard, then the major north–south highway on the East side.

Following the opening of the bridge and highway in 1940, Factoria became a major crossroads. In 1950, the 900-car Sunset Outdoor Theatre was constructed near the intersection by Sterling Theatres, Inc.

Factoria remained largely undeveloped up until the 1960s, when freeway construction put the area at the intersection of two major arterials, Interstate 405 and Interstate 90, which would replace most of the original town-site and create a major suburban retail center. The construction of a 42-acre (17 ha) shopping center was announced in July 1961. Since the 2010s, the area has undergone significant gentrification due to an influx of tech and other white-collar workers.

== Commerce and industry ==
Factoria's commercial development is centered on Marketplace at Factoria, a nearby AMC movie theater, and several grocery stores and office buildings, including the six-tower Newport Corporate Center, occupied primarily by T-Mobile USA. The "Factoria Campus" development situated directly north of The Marketplace at Factoria, consists of three office buildings plus a cinema and some retail businesses, standing where the Sunset Outdoor Theater formerly existed.

== Geography ==
Factoria serves as a commercial center for surrounding residential neighborhoods, such as Eastgate, Somerset, Newport Hills, Newport Shores, Mockingbird Hill, Greenwich Crest, and Woodridge. The Factoria area represents a community of about 2,100 acres (8.5 km^{2}) bounded by Interstate 90 to the north, Lake Washington to the west, the Somerset Hills to the east, the Newport Hills to the south. The area contains about 5,000 residential units, 11,000,000 square feet (1,000,000 m^{2}) of commercial space, and offices employing 7,500 people. Public transportation in Factoria is served by King County Metro buses, primarily routes 240, 241, 245 (frequent), and 246, with service to much of the Eastside. Nearby Eastgate Park and Ride provides additional service into Seattle. Factoria Boulevard, Richards Road, Eastgate Way, Newport Way, and Coal Creek Parkway are major arterials that lead to or through the Factoria area.

== The Marketplace at Factoria ==
The Marketplace at Factoria first opened in 1977 under the name Factoria Square, later renamed Factoria Mall. It originally contained about 20 retailers and was anchored by Ernst Home Centers, Lamonts, Pay 'n Save, and Safeway. In 2008, the mall was slated for new urbanist redevelopment under current owner Kimco Realty, likely a result of being labeled a dead mall as anchors such as Mervyn's moved out. It was renamed the Marketplace at Factoria.

As of 2023, the Marketplace at Factoria has 69 retail spaces anchored by Old Navy, Target, TJ Maxx, DSW, and Nordstrom Rack. Walmart, which opened in the former Mervyn's space in 2012, closed its Factoria store on April 22, 2022, due to poor financial performance partly induced by competition with the neighboring Target. The Walmart space was replaced on December 5, 2024 by the first U.S. location for T&T Supermarket, a Canadian company which operates Asian grocery stores. The Rite Aid location shut down on August 28, 2025, and Amazon Fresh shut down on February 1, 2026.
