= Alex Love =

American boxer (born 1989)

Alex Love (born June 2, 1989) is an American boxer in the flyweight class.

== Biography ==
Love was born on June 2, 1989, in Monroe, Washington, a small town about 35 miles northeast of Seattle. She attended Interlake High School in Bellevue, Washington. While in school she played for the girls' basketball team. When Love was a sophomore in high school she was determined to build up her endurance for basketball and decided to pick up boxing as a cross-training tool. The gym she began training at was Ring Sports United, owned by four time boxing/kickboxing world champion Kim Messer who began mentoring Love, which is when she says she fell in love with the sport. Before Love took on boxing as a full-time endeavor she worked for the City of Bellevue's Parks and Recreation Department coaching youth sports. She was also attending college where her interest was focused on a possible degree in Criminal Justice. Her other passions include playing guitar and hiking.

Love received the silver medal at the Golden Gloves, her first championship fight. In 2010, she defeated the Polish World champion Karolina Michalczuk. It was her closest fight ever, 17-16. She has also been the recipient of the outstanding athlete award at the Woman's International Dual.

On March 4, 2012 Alex won the 2012 USA Boxing National Chamtionships at 106 pounds.

== Olympics ==
In 2012 Summer Olympics women's boxing was included in the Olympic games. When female boxer Alex Love heard the news that women's boxing was now an Olympic sport she put everything on hold, her job and college, to devote herself entirely to training for the Olympics. At 21 years old she is only 112 pounds and 5'1" tall. Her coaches believe it's her speed and strong defense that will make her an Olympic champion for 2012.

The International Olympic Committee (IOC) announced 36 places would be available to the world's top female fighters in three weight classes: flyweight (112 lbs), lightweight (132 lbs) and middleweight (165 lbs). Love is currently working on getting one of those slots in the flyweight class. She is training in both Washington and Arizona.

== Major results ==
2010 Silver Medalist National Golden Gloves
2010 Ringside World Champion
2010 Bronze Medalist National PALS
2010 International Dual Champion + Outstanding Athlete
2010 State Golden Gloves Champ
2010 Regional Champ
2011 Regional Champ
2011 State Golden Gloves Champ
2011 Bronze Medalist National PALS
2012 USA Boxing National Championships
