= Odle Middle School =

Public middle school in Bellevue, Washington, US

Coordinates: 47°37′1.54″N 122°8′53.95″W

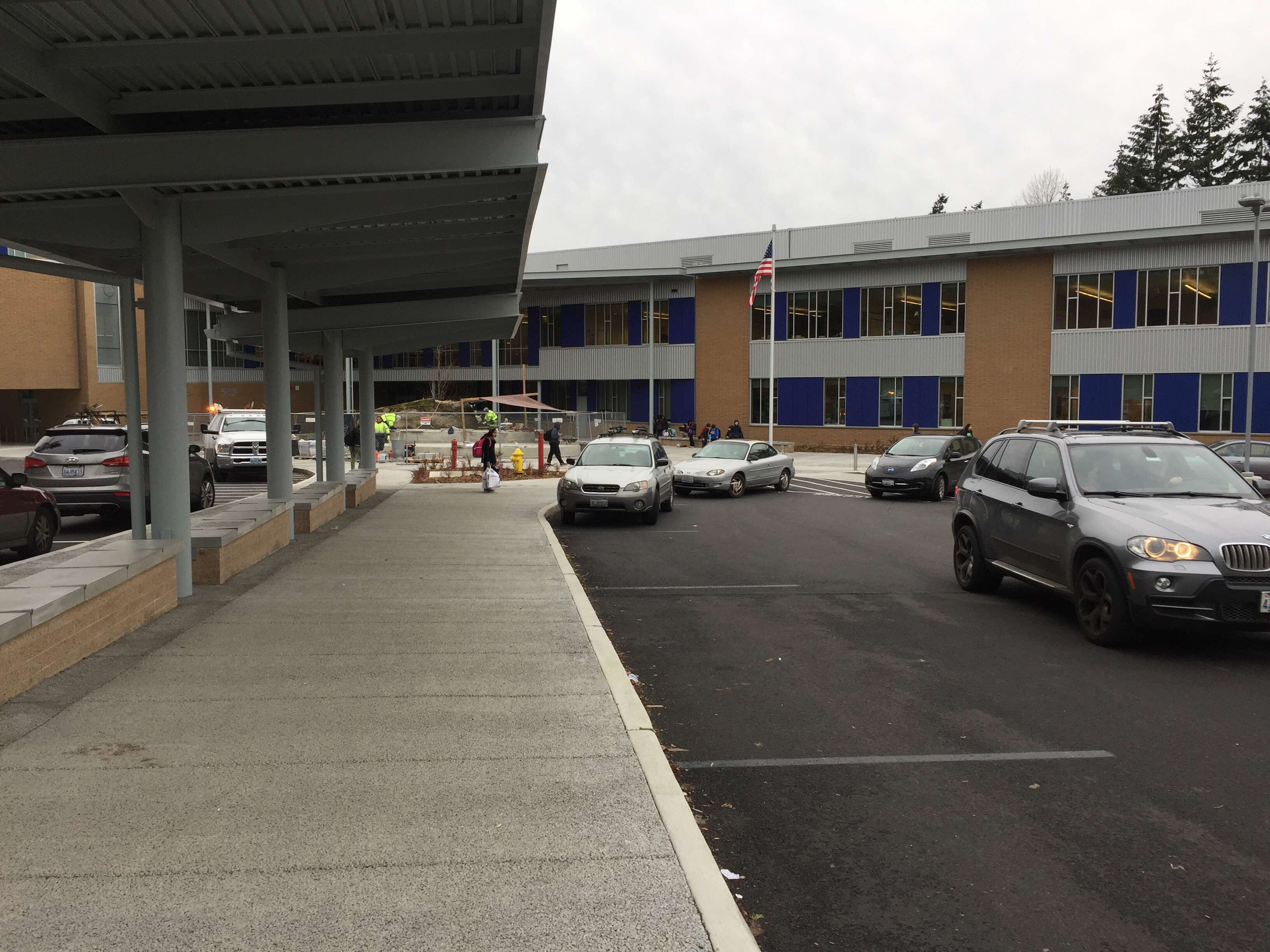
- Odle Middle School during construction
- 502 143rd Ave NE; Bellevue, WA 98007

Information
- Type: Public middle school
- Motto: One Dynamic Learning Environment
- Established: 1969
- School district: Bellevue School District
- Principal: Joseph Potts
- Faculty: 84 (on FTE basis)
- Grades: 6–8
- Enrollment: 964 (2016-17)
- Student to teacher ratio: 18.5
- Colors: Red, blue
- Nickname: Vikings
- Rival: Highland
- Feeder to: Sammamish High School
- Website: School website

Odle Middle School is a public middle school in the Crossroads neighborhood of Bellevue, Washington, United States. The school is one of seven middle schools in the Bellevue School District and was named posthumously after Frank Odle, who taught in the district for 55 years before retiring in 1968. Odle is located near Stevenson Elementary, formerly a primary feeder elementary school for Odle. Odle is primarily known for its hosting of the ALS program, a gifted program for high-performing children. As of the 2025–26 school year, the school's principal is Joseph Potts.

In the 2001–02 school year, Odle Middle School was one of two schools in the state to be awarded a Blue Ribbon by the U.S. Department of Education

== Demographics ==
As of the 2025-2026 school year, the school had an enrollment of 987 students. 66% of the students are Asian, 13% are Caucasian, 8% are Hispanic, 8% are multi-ethnic, and 5% are African American. 45% speak a first language other than English, and 20% are eligible to receive free/reduced price meals.

== Academics ==
=== Advanced Learning Program ===
The Advanced Leaning, or AL program at Odle is part of the Advanced Learning program offered in the Bellevue School District for grades 2 through 12.

GT is a selective program; applicants must have a minimum score of 144 on the Cognitive Abilities Test. Reading and Quantitative scores must be of the 90th percentile or higher, one of which must be at or above the 97th percentile.

=== High school extension ===
The high school AL program extends the science, English and social studies classes further in the International Baccalaureate (IB) program at Interlake High School. In the IB program, AL students complete the IB diploma during 10th and 11th grade, rather than the usual 11th and 12th grade.

== Extracurriculars ==
=== Rocketry ===
In 2016, Odle Middle School's rocketry club sponsored three teams in the Team America Rocketry Challenge (TARC). In the competition's qualifying round, two of the teams placed in the top 100 teams in the nation, earning them a spot at the TARC national finals, the third team placed as a second alternate. One of the teams, the Odle Middle School "Space Potatoes," won the 2016 Team America Rocketry Challenge, earning more than $20,000 in prizes and scholarships and a trip to London to compete in the International Rocketry Challenge. The team went on to win International Rocketry Challenge at the Farnborough International Airshow on July 15, besting the top student rocketry teams from the United Kingdom, France and Japan.

=== Chess ===
Odle Middle School earned first place in the 2006 national K–8 chess championship and got seventh place in Chess Supernationals 2013 K-8 chess championship. The chess team has also claimed first place in the Washington Middle School Team Championship for the school years 2005–06, 2006–07, 2007–08, 2008–09, 2009–10, and 2010–11. In April 2014, members of the Odle Chess Team went to Atlanta, Georgia, to compete in the National Junior High Chess Championship. The team is currently has the highest average rating as a team for the K-8 division.

Odle Middle School tied for 1st place in the national 2016 K-8 chess championship.

Odle Middle School 2017 graduate Naomi Bashkansky is a 2016 World Schools Chess Champion (Girls U13), a 2017 North American Junior Girls Under 20 Champion, and a Woman International Master.

=== Science Bowl Club ===
The Odle Science Bowl Club has participated in the U.S. Department of Energy's National Science Bowl since 2017. Over the years, it has gotten:
- National 2nd Place in 2017
- National 1st Place in 2018
- National 3rd Place in 2021
- National 1st Place in 2022

=== History ===
The Odle History Club has participated in the International Academic Competitions' (IAC) National History Bee.

== 2014-2016 remodeling ==
In 2014, Odle Middle School decided to remodel the old building; implement about 200 kW worth of new solar panels, the most solar power put on any BSD school building to date. The solar panels were built specifically for the newly designed classrooms created for classes involving STEM and the arts. Alongside solar panels, expansive athletics infrastructure, thermal floors, etc were also implemented. During the two year construction period of the new building, which is next to Stevenson Elementary School, Odle Middle School was moved to the Bellevue School District's designated swing school, Ringdall Middle School.
