= Linea Johnson =

American author and mental health advocate

- Born: 1985 or 1986 (age 39–40)
- Education: Seattle University; Brown University
- Writing career
- Genres: Non-fiction, memoir
- Subject: Mental Health
- Notable work: Perfect Chaos

Linea Johnson (born 1985 or 1986) is the American co-author of the 2012 memoir Perfect Chaos and a mental health advocate.

== Early life and education ==
Linea Johnson grew up in Chelan, Washington with her sister Jordan and mental health professional mother and father, Cinda and Curt. While Johnson was in middle school, her family moved to Bellevue, Washington. She graduated from Sammamish High School, where she and her mother say was a high achiever. Johnson played fastpitch softball and basketball throughout school, and played piano and took voice lessons for choir. Johnson was diagnosed with depression after her first "crash" during high school, after she quit her activities, and prescribed antidepressants. She said that the medication helped with the sadness, but also "robbed [her] of the euphoria of joy", so she stopped taking them.

After graduating, Johnson moved to Chicago, Illinois to attend Columbia College majoring in music performance on a scholarship. Halfway through her freshman year, Johnson had another major depressive episode, prompting her to seek counseling. She was diagnosed with bipolar disorder, which she and her mother did not believe as Johnson did not experience mania, and Johnson turned to alcohol and marijuana to deal with her depression and anxiety instead. After a trip to Scotland and England, and a summer internship, Johnson experienced another depressive episode during her sophomore year of college, prompting her to seek out a psychiatrist, who diagnosed her with bipolar II disorder, explaining that it was different than bipolar I disorder, accompanied only by hypomania and severe depressive mood swings Johnson was familiar with. He prescribed her hypnotics, which Johnson said she never filled because she was constantly obsessing over suicide. Johnson subsequently dropped out of Columbia and moved back to Washington with her parents to seek treatment.

Johnson's mother said that because she and Johnson's father were well connected in Seattle's mental health professional community it only took a couple of weeks to set Johnson up with treatment, but recognized the "mental-health maze" was inaccessible and inequitable for most patients. After starting treatment, Johnson moved into her own apartment in Capitol Hill, a neighborhood in Seattle. Soon after, she experienced another episode and planned a suicide attempt. She alerted her doctor and was transported to Harborview Medical Center and transferred to the University of Washington Medical Center's psychiatric unit where she underwent electroconvulsive therapy, a treatment that induces seizures, and an intense six-week treatment cycle that ultimately relieved her of her suicidal thoughts.

Following her treatment, Johnson enrolled in Seattle University where she received a Bachelor of Arts in creative writing.

Johnson also holds a Master's degree in Healthcare Leadership from Brown University.

== Career ==
Johnson started her career as an intern at the Seattle Center Foundation and later as an intern at World Health Organization working on mental health policy.

After graduating from college, she joined Harborview Medical Center.

She joined the University of Washington in 2015, where she is now the communications manager of the ADA National Network Knowledge Translation Center.

Johnson delivers talks and volunteers in the mental health community and advocates for better mental healthcare in the United States.

== Selected works ==
- Johnson, Linea; Johnson, Cinda (2012). Perfect chaos : a daughter's journey to survive bipolar, a mother's struggle to save her (1st ed.). New York: St. Martin's Press. ISBN 978-0-312-58182-4. OCLC 759914168.
- Johnson, Linea (2014-08-17). "Guest: Mental illness does not mean your life is over". The Seattle Times. ISSN 0745-9696.
- Jensen, Mark P.; Galer, Peter D.; Johnson, Linea L.; George, Holly R.; Mendoza, M. Elena; Gertz, Kevin J. (2016). "The Associations Between Pain-related Beliefs, Pain Intensity, and Patient Functioning: Hypnotizability as a Moderator". The Clinical Journal of Pain. 32 (6): 506–512. doi:10.1097/AJP.0000000000000294. ISSN 1536-5409. PMC 4777683. PMID 26340655.
- Vowles, Kevin E.; Johnson, Linea E.; Gertz, Kevin J.; Jensen, Mark P. (2017). "Development and Preliminary Testing of a Screening Measure of Acceptance and Willingness in Relation to Pain, Fatigue, and Sadness in Chronic Pain". The Clinical Journal of Pain. 33 (2): 160–165. doi:10.1097/AJP.0000000000000384. ISSN 1536-5409. PMID 27022673. S2CID 37732207.
- Jensen, Mark P.; Vowles, Kevin E.; Johnson, Linea E.; Gertz, Kevin J. (2015). "Living Well with Pain: Development and Preliminary Evaluation of the Valued Living Scale". Pain Medicine (Malden, Mass.). 16 (11): 2109–2120. doi:10.1111/pme.12802. ISSN 1526-4637. PMID 26031326.
- Jensen, Mark P.; Johnson, Linea E.; Gertz, Kevin J.; Galer, Bradley S.; Gammaitoni, Arnold R. (2013). "The words patients use to describe chronic pain: implications for measuring pain quality". Pain. 154 (12): 2722–2728. doi:10.1016/j.pain.2013.08.003. ISSN 1872-6623. PMID 23933183. S2CID 20158003.
- Johnson, Cinda; Eva, Amy L; Johnson, Linea; Walker, Bridget (2011). "Don't Turn Away: Empowering Teachers to Support Students' Mental Health". The Clearing House. 84 (1): 9–14. doi:10.1080/00098655.2010.484441. ISSN 0009-8655. JSTOR 41149857. S2CID 142830068.
