= National Science Bowl =

Annual science competition held in the United States of America

- Official logo
- Nickname: NSB
- Status: Active
- Genre: Quiz bowl
- Frequency: Annual (late April)
- Location: Washington, D.C.
- Inaugurated: 1991
- Organizer: United States Department of Energy
- Website: https://science.osti.gov/wdts/nsb

The National Science Bowl (NSB) is a high school and middle school science knowledge competition, using a quiz bowl format, held in the United States. A buzzer system similar to those seen on popular television game shows is used to signal an answer. The competition has been organized and sponsored by the United States Department of Energy since its inception in 1991.

== Subject areas ==
Questions are asked in the categories of Biology, Chemistry, Earth and Space Science, Energy (dealing with DOE research), Mathematics, and Physics.

Several categories have been added, dropped, or merged throughout the years. Computer Science was dropped from the list in late 2002. Current Events was in the 2005 competition, but did not make a return. General Science was dropped and Astronomy was merged with Earth Science to create Earth and Space Science in 2011.

== Regional competitions ==
The winning team of each regional Science Bowl competition is invited to participate in the National Science Bowl finals in Washington, D.C., with all expenses paid. As of 2018, there were 65 high school regionals and 48 middle school regionals. These figures include the two "super regional" sites that are permitted to send two teams to the national competition. The two super regionals are the Kansas/Missouri Regional High School Science Bowl and the Connecticut/Northeast Regional High School Science Bowl (The Northeast Regional includes Rhode Island, Connecticut, Massachusetts, New Hampshire, Vermont, and parts of New York).

Typically, any school that meets the eligibility requirements of the National Science Bowl is permitted to register for its regional competition according to its geographic location. No school may compete in multiple regionals. In addition, most regional competitions permit schools to register up to three teams. Since 2017, club teams are no longer able to compete.

== Rules ==
This section begins with the rules for in person competitions (used by the national competition and majority of regionals) and finishes with the rules for virtual competitions.

=== General rules ===
A team consists of 4 or 5 students from a single school. Only 4 students play at any one time, while the 5th is designated as the alternate. Substitutions and switching captains may occur at halftime, between rounds, or before a tiebreaker round.

Two teams compete against each other in each match. Each student is given a designation: A1, A Captain, A2, A3, B1, B Captain, B2, or B3, according to the position they sit in. In regional competitions, each round consists of 23 questions (that is, 23 toss-ups and 23 corresponding bonuses). At the National Finals, each round consists of 25 questions. The match is over when all the toss-up questions have been read (and any bonuses related to correctly answered toss-ups), or after two halves have elapsed, whichever occurs first. The team with the most points at this time is the winner. At the regional level, all matches consist of two 8-minute halves, separated by a 2-minute break. At the national level for middle schools, all matches consist of two 10-minute halves. For high schools, all round robin and some double elimination matches consist of two 10-minute halves, with the final rounds consisting of two 12-minute halves to accommodate the longer visual bonus questions. A toss-up/bonus cycle that is begun before time expires in a half will be finished under the usual rules before the half ends. A question officially begins once its subject area is completely read.

=== Toss-ups ===
Every match begins with a toss-up question. The moderator announces the subject of the question (see "Subject Areas" above), as well as its type (Multiple Choice or Short Answer). Once the moderator completes the reading of the question, students have 5 seconds to buzz in and give an answer. Students may buzz in at any time after the category has been read—there is no need to wait for the moderator to finish. However, there is a penalty for interrupting the moderator and giving an incorrect answer. After buzzing in, a student must wait for an official to verbally recognize them by saying their designation; otherwise it is considered a blurt, resulting in the answer being ignored and the team being disqualified from answering the toss-up. Upon recognition, the student must give their response within a natural pause (up to 2 seconds); otherwise it is considered a stall and ruled incorrect. If a student buzzes in and answers incorrectly, that student's team may not buzz in again on that question, and the opposing team (if still eligible to answer) gets another 5 seconds to buzz in. Quiet nonverbal communication (e.g. in writing or by hand signals) among team members is allowed on toss-ups, but audible communication or mouthing words is not permitted and will disqualify the team from answering the toss-up.

An answer given by a student is ruled correct or incorrect by the moderator. On short answer questions, if the answer given differs from the official one, the moderator uses his or her judgment to make a ruling (which is subject to a challenge by the competitors). On multiple choice questions, students may give the letter answer (W, X, Y, or Z) or the verbal answer. A verbal answer on a multiple choice question is only correct if it matches the official answer exactly. However, when the choices are mathematical expressions that would be conventionally written in symbols, common alternate expressions of the answer shall be accepted. For example, “square root of 2” and “square root 2” would both be accepted.

=== Bonuses ===
If a student answers a toss-up question correctly, that student's team receives a bonus question. The bonus question is always in the same category as the corresponding toss-up question, though it may not always relate to the toss-up question. Since only one team has the opportunity to answer the bonus question, there is no need to buzz in to answer it. After the moderator finishes reading the question, the team has 20 seconds to answer. The timekeeper will give a 5-second warning when 5 seconds remain. Conferring between team members is permitted, but the team captain must give the team's final answer.

Visual bonuses were introduced in 2003. They are only included in the final elimination rounds. The team has 30 seconds to answer a question with the aid of a visual displayed on a monitor (for the final matches) or on a distributed worksheet (for earlier elimination matches).

The same rules apply to the judging of responses to bonus questions as apply to responses to toss-up questions. Once the team's answer has been ruled right or wrong, the moderator proceeds to the next toss-up question.

If neither team answers the toss-up question correctly, the bonus question is not read, and the moderator proceeds to the next toss-up question.

=== Scoring ===
Correct responses to toss-up questions are worth 4 points each, and correct responses to bonus questions are worth 10 points each.

If a student buzzes in on a toss-up question before the moderator has completely read the question (i.e., interrupts the moderator) and answers incorrectly (or a blurt or audible communication from the interrupting team occurs), then 4 points are awarded to the opposing team, and the question is re-read in its entirety so that the opposing team has an opportunity to buzz in. Should the opposing team interrupt during the rereading of the question and subsequently incur a penalty as in the previous rule, then 4 points are added to the first team's score, and the moderator proceeds to the next toss-up question.

=== Challenges ===
Challenges must be made before the moderator begins reading the next question, or 3 seconds after the last question of the half or game. Only the 4 actively competing members may challenge. The fifth team member, coach, and others associated with a team may not become involved in challenges or their discussion. However, beginning in 2020, anyone in the competition room can make the officials aware of scoring or clock management errors, these are known as corrections rather than challenges.

Challenges may be made either to scientific content or the administration of rules. They may not be made to judgment calls by the officials, such as whether a buzz was an interrupt, whether 20 seconds have passed before beginning to answer a bonus, or whether a stall or blurt has happened. Challenges to scientific content are limited to 2 unsuccessful challenges per round. Successful challenges do not count against this limit. Each team has unlimited challenges to administration of rules.

=== Rules for Virtual Competitions ===
For 2026, the US Department of Energy will host a nationwide virtual regional Science Bowl for schools meeting certain criteria. Additionally, in-person regional events may be required to switch to a virtual event at any time.

Beginning in 2026, virtual events will use a head-to-head format. The rules are very similar to in-person events, with the following differences:

- The rounds have 18 questions with two halves of 8 minutes.
- Each player and coach must be in different rooms.
- In order to answer a bonus question, the team captain must raise their hand and say their answer.
- On toss-up questions, team members may only communicate nonverbally using hand signals. No writing, use of the Zoom chat box, audible communication, or mouthing words is permitted.

== Competition format ==
This section is concerned with the format of the national competition only. The competition format varies greatly among the different regional competitions.

Regionals typically use round robin, single-elimination, double-elimination, or any combination of these formats. The 2026 virtual regional event managed by the US Department of energy will use a combination of round-robin and single-elimination.

The national competition always consists of two stages: round-robin and double-elimination.

=== Round-robin ===
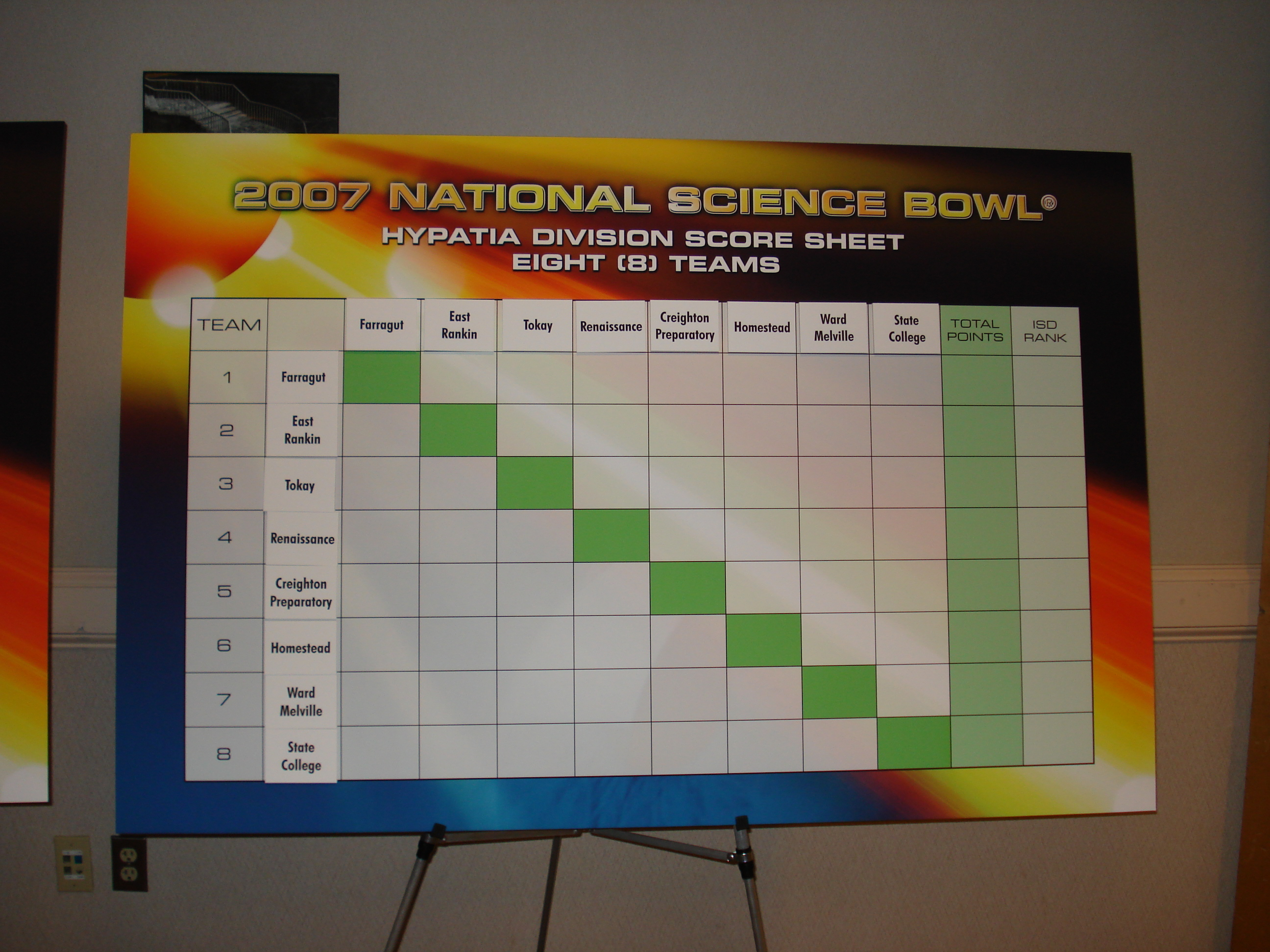
A blank score display board from the Hypatia division at the 2007 Nationals.

All competing teams are randomly arranged (each team captain randomly picks a division and position on the first day of the National Finals) into eight round-robin groups of eight or nine teams each for high school and six teams each for middle school. Every team plays every other team in its group once, receiving 2 points for a win, 1 point for a tie, or 0 points for a loss. If a team's opponent has not arrived, that team can practice instead. The rules still apply, though any win or loss is not counted. In previous years, the top two teams from each group advanced to the double-elimination stage. Starting in 2020, four teams from each group will advance.

==== Tiebreaks ====
In the event that two or more teams are tied for one of the top spots in a division, the result of the Division Team Challenge (DTC) is used as a tiebreak. This method is only used for high schools.

For middle schools, there are several tiebreak procedures, applied in the following order:

1. The head-to-head record of all the tied teams is compared. If this separates a group of two or more teams from the rest of the tied teams, the head-to-head record will be reapplied in the smaller group.
2. If the top four teams cannot be determined using head-to head records, the following procedures are used:
  - If more than two teams are still tied, each team is placed in a separate room and is read five toss-up questions. Each team's score is determined by the number of questions answered correctly minus the number answered incorrectly. The team(s) with the highest score(s) win(s) the tiebreak.
  - If two teams are still tied, the two teams compete head-to-head, receiving five toss-up questions at 4 points for each correct answer (no bonus questions are used). All the usual toss-up rules are in effect, including the interrupt penalty. The team with the higher score wins the tiebreak.

If a tie still exists after the second step, it is reapplied until the tie is resolved.

=== Single/Double-elimination ===
Starting in 2020, 32 teams advance to the double elimination stage. Prior to 2020, approximately 16 teams advanced from the round-robin (depending on the number of round robin groups). In 2006, the teams were seeded into a single-elimination tournament based on their preliminary round-robin results. In previous years, a team's position in the double-elimination tournament was determined by random draw; teams were not seeded in any way. The competition then proceeded (in 2006) like a typical single-elimination tournament. Seeding continued in the 2007 tournament: teams that won their pool were paired against teams that placed second in theirs. Unlike in the round-robin, a match in double-elimination cannot be tied. If a match is tied at the end of regulation, overtime periods of five toss-ups each are played until the tie is broken.

== Prizes ==
The top two high school teams receive trips to one of the National Parks, all-expenses paid.

The top three middle and high school teams receive a trophy, individual medals, and photographs with officials of the Department of Energy.

The top 16 middle and high schools earn a check for their school's science departments. As of 2024, the top 16 schools receive $1,000 and the top 2 schools receive $5,000. Also individually, 2nd place winners receive a $250 AMAZON gift card while 1st place receives a $500 AMAZON gift card.

Each team with the best Division Team Challenge/Cyber Challenge result in their division earns a $500 check for their school's science department.

== Car competition ==
For the middle school teams, the DOE also sponsored a car competition challenging competitors to construct a car capable of attaining high speeds. They are powered through alternative energy sources such as hydrogen fuel cells and solar panels. The winners of the car competition were awarded with $500 for their school.

== Results of the national competition ==
=== Middle school ===
Year	First place	Second place	Third place	Fourth place
2026	William Diamond Middle School	Joaquin Miller Middle School	Winston Churchill Middle School	Hopkins Junior High School
2025	Hopkins Junior High School	Fort Settlement Middle School	Winston Churchill Middle School	Evergreen Middle School
2024	BASIS Independent Bellevue	Hopkins Junior High School	Davis Drive Middle School	Glasgow Middle School
2023	BASIS Independent Bellevue	Jonas Clarke Middle School	Joaquin Miller Middle School	Minnetonka East Middle School
2022	Odle Middle School	Jonas Clarke Middle School	Joaquin Miller Middle School	The Davidson Academy of Nevada
2021 (Note: The 2020 and 2021 competitions were virtual, with modified rules, due to the COVID-19 pandemic.)	Jonas Clarke Middle School	Wisconsin Hills Middle School	Odle Middle School	Winston Churchill Middle School
2020	Preston Middle School	Jonas Clarke Middle School	Ladue Middle School	Wisconsin Hills Middle School
2019	Jonas Clarke Middle School	Joaquin Miller Middle School	Daniel Wright Junior High School	Rachel Carson Middle School
2018	Odle Middle School	Windemere Ranch Middle School	Rachel Carson Middle School	Ames Middle School
2017	Joaquin Miller Middle School	Odle Middle School	Quail Valley Middle School	Ladue Middle School
2016	Joaquin Miller Middle School	Sycamore School	Jonas Clarke Middle School	Fort Settlement Middle School
2015	Fort Settlement Middle School	Roberto Clemente Middle School	Academy for Science and Design	Hopkins Junior High School
2014	Greater Boston Science & Math	JDroids Science Club	Takoma Park Middle School	Science Infinity Club
2013	Creekside Middle School	Takoma Park Middle School	Hopkins Junior High School	Treasure Valley Math and Science Center
2012	Hopkins Junior High School	Longfellow Middle School	Seattle Science Infinity Club	Treasure Valley Math and Science Center
2011	Gale Ranch Middle School	Shahala Middle School	Hopkins Junior High School	Van Antwerp Middle School
2010	Albuquerque Academy	Gale Ranch Middle School	Hopkins Junior High School	Marshall Middle School
2009	Hopkins Junior High School	Jonas Clarke Middle School	Challenger School	Albuquerque Academy
2008	Challenger School	Hopkins Junior High School	St. Andrew's Episcopal School	
2007	Honey Creek Middle School	Challenger School	Longfellow Middle School	
2006	Honey Creek Middle School	Albuquerque Academy	Daniel Wright Junior High School	
2005	Honey Creek Middle School	St. Andrew's Episcopal School	Lincoln Middle School	
2004	Ronald McNair Magnet School	Lux Middle School	Los Alamos Middle School	
2003	College Station Middle School	Roosevelt Middle School	Albuquerque Academy	
2002	Samford Middle School			

=== High school ===
Year	Number of Teams	First place	Second place	Third place	Fourth place
2026	68	Mission San Jose High School (Fremont, California)	Davidson Academy (Reno, Nevada)	Lakeside School (Seattle, Washington)	Montgomery Blair High School (Silver Spring, Maryland)
2025	67	Montgomery Blair High School (Silver Spring, Maryland)	Lexington High School (Lexington, Massachusetts)	North Hollywood High School (North Hollywood, California)	Lakeside School (Seattle, Washington)
2024	67	Lexington High School (Lexington, Massachusetts)	North Hollywood High School (North Hollywood, California)	University High School (Irvine, California)	Clements High School (Sugar Land, Texas)
2023	68	Lexington High School (Lexington, Massachusetts)	University High School (Irvine, California)	The Westminster Schools (Atlanta, Georgia)	Enloe High School (Raleigh, North Carolina)
2022	64	Lynbrook High School (San Jose, California)	Mission San Jose High School (Fremont, California)	Tesla STEM High School (Redmond, Washington)	Montgomery Blair High School (Silver Spring, Maryland)
2021	63	North Hollywood High School (North Hollywood, California)	Naperville North High School (Naperville, Illinois)	Dougherty Valley High School (San Ramon, California)	Eastside High School (Gainesville, Florida)
2020	61	Dougherty Valley High School (San Ramon, California)	Mira Loma High School (Sacramento, California)	Lubbock High School (Lubbock, Texas)	North Hollywood High School (North Hollywood, California)
2019	64	Wayzata High School (Plymouth, Minnesota)	Dulles High School (Sugar Land, Texas)	North Hollywood High School (North Hollywood, California)	Thomas Jefferson High School for Science and Technology (Alexandria, Virginia)
2018	65	Lexington High School (Lexington, Massachusetts)	North Hollywood High School (North Hollywood, California)	Ardsley High School (Ardsley, New York)	Mira Loma High School (Sacramento, California)
2017	63	Lexington High School (Lexington, Massachusetts)	Thomas Jefferson High School for Science and Technology (Alexandria, Virginia)	Dougherty Valley High School (San Ramon, California)	Mira Loma High School (Sacramento, California)
2016	69	Montgomery Blair High School (Silver Spring, Maryland)	Lynbrook High School (San Jose, California)	Clements High School (Sugar Land, Texas)	Lexington High School (Lexington, Massachusetts)
2015	68	Mira Loma High School (Sacramento, California)	Thomas Jefferson High School for Science and Technology (Alexandria, Virginia)	E. O. Smith High School (Storrs, Connecticut)	Arcadia High School (Arcadia, California)
2014	68	Mira Loma High School (Sacramento, California)	Westview High School (Beaverton, Oregon)	Regis High School (New York City)	Baton Rouge Magnet High School (Baton Rouge, Louisiana)
2013	68	Mira Loma High School (Sacramento, California)	North Carolina School of Science and Mathematics (Durham, North Carolina)	Lexington High School (Lexington, Massachusetts)	University High School (Irvine, California)
2012	69	Lexington High School (Lexington, Massachusetts)	North Hollywood High School (North Hollywood, California)	Mira Loma High School (Sacramento, California)	Morgantown High School (Morgantown, West Virginia)
2011	69	Mira Loma High School (Sacramento, California)	Montgomery Blair High School (Silver Spring, Maryland)	Sunset High School (Portland, Oregon)	Hunter College High School (New York, New York)
2010	68	North Carolina School of Science and Mathematics (Durham, North Carolina)	Mira Loma High School (Sacramento, California)	North Hollywood High School (North Hollywood, California)	Arcadia High School (Arcadia, California)
2009	67	Mira Loma High School (Sacramento, California)	Lexington High School (Lexington, Massachusetts)	Oak Ridge High School (Oak Ridge, Tennessee)	Santa Monica High School (Santa Monica, California)
2008	67	Santa Monica High School (Santa Monica, California)	Mira Loma High School (Sacramento, California)	Thomas Jefferson High School for Science and Technology (Alexandria, Virginia)	Fairview High School (Boulder, Colorado)
2007	64	Poudre High School (Fort Collins, Colorado)	State College Area High School (State College, Pennsylvania)	East Chapel Hill High School (Chapel Hill, North Carolina)	Miami Palmetto Senior High School (Pinecrest, Florida)
2006	65	State College Area High School (State College, Pennsylvania)	North Hollywood High School (North Hollywood, California)	Santa Monica High School (Santa Monica, California)	Albany High School (Albany, California)
2005	63	Thomas Jefferson High School for Science and Technology (Alexandria, Virginia)	Mission San Jose High School (Fremont, California)	George Walton Comprehensive High School (Marietta, Georgia)	Miami Palmetto Senior High School (Pinecrest, Florida)
2004	64	Thomas Jefferson High School for Science and Technology (Alexandria, Virginia)	A&M Consolidated High School (College Station, Texas)	Baton Rouge Magnet High School (Baton Rouge, Louisiana)	Montgomery Blair High School (Silver Spring, Maryland)
2003	66	Thomas Jefferson High School for Science and Technology (Alexandria, Virginia)	Centerville High School (Centerville, Ohio)	A&M Consolidated High School (College Station, Texas)	Taylor Allderdice High School (Pittsburgh, Pennsylvania)
2002	64	Thomas Jefferson High School for Science and Technology (Alexandria, Virginia)	Boulder High School (Boulder, Colorado)	Mission San Jose High School (Fremont, California)	Sycamore High School (Cincinnati, Ohio)

The winning teams from the years 1991-2001 were

- 2001 (61 teams) North Hollywood High School (North Hollywood, California)
- 2000 (60 teams) duPont Manual High School (Louisville, Kentucky)
- 1999 (53 teams) Montgomery Blair High School (Silver Spring, Maryland)
- 1998 (48 teams) Valley High School (West Des Moines, Iowa)
- 1997 (45 teams) Venice High School (Los Angeles, California)
- 1996 (53 teams) Venice High School (Los Angeles, California)
- 1995 (55 teams) Van Nuys High School (Van Nuys, California)
- 1994 (51 teams) The Westminster Schools (Atlanta, Georgia)
- 1993 (43 teams) Albany High School (Albany, California)
- 1992 (29 teams) Lubbock High School (Lubbock, Texas)
- 1991 (18 teams) Lubbock High School (Lubbock, Texas)

== See also ==
- Quiz Bowl
