= Interlake High School =

Location
- 16245 Northeast 24th Street; Bellevue, Washington 98008; United States; 47.629°N 122.124°W

Information
- Type: Public high school
- Motto: Integrity, Humanity, Scholarship
- Established: 1967; 59 years ago
- School district: Bellevue S.D.
- CEEB code: 480069
- Principal: Bret Cochrun
- Teaching staff: 82.26 (FTE)
- Grades: 9–12
- Enrollment: 1,604 (2023–2024)
- Student to teacher ratio: 19.50
- Colors: Navy blue, Columbia blue, White
- Mascot: Saint Bernard
- Nickname: Saints
- Newspaper: The Interlake Inquirer
- Website: School website
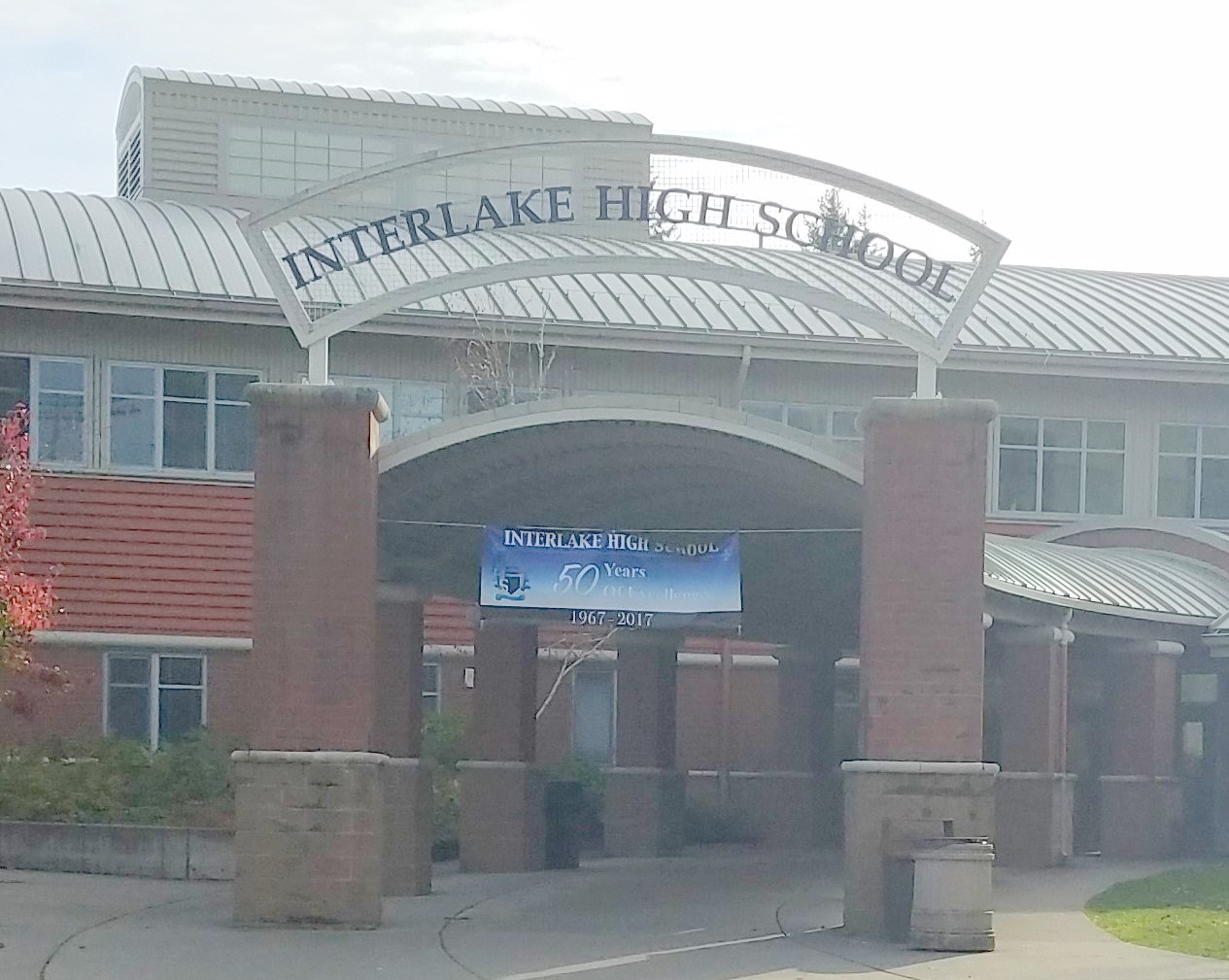
- IHS main entrance in 2017, with 50th anniversary banner

Interlake High School (IHS) is a public secondary school in Bellevue, Washington, one of the four traditional high schools in the Bellevue School District. Its mascot is a Saint Bernard named Bernie, and the school's students are known as the "Saints."

== History ==
Interlake High School opened in 1968. In 1997, Interlake began offering the International Baccalaureate program.

In 2003, most of the school was torn to the ground and rebuilt while its students continued to attend class in portables. The new building opened at the beginning of the 2005-2006 school year.

== Students ==
=== AL Program ===
The AL program at Interlake is part of the Advanced Placement program offered in the Bellevue School District for grades 2 through 12.

The AL program is a selective program; in which applicants must have a minimum score of 144 on the Cognitive Abilities Test. Reading and Quantitative scores must be of the 90th percentile or higher, one of which must be at or above the 97th percentile. Students who usually partake in the AL Program usually graduate from the middle school AL Program offered in two Bellevue School District schools; Odle Middle School and Tyee Middle School. The high school AL program continued from the middle school AL Program extends the science, English, and social studies classes further in the International Baccalaureate (IB) program. In the IB program, AL students complete the IB diploma during 10th and 11th grade, rather than the usual 11th and 12th grade.

== Notable alumni ==
- Michael Allan – former NFL tight end
- Larry Andersen – former MLB pitcher
- Brad Barquist – highest finishing American in the 10k at the 1996 Olympics and former Interlake cross country and track coach
- Chris DeGarmo – former Guitarist for the Grammy-nominated band Queensrÿche
- Luke Esser – former state senator and chairman of the Washington State Republican Party
- Tom Flick – former NFL quarterback
- Alex Love – flyweight boxer
- Bobby McAllister – soccer player and the cofounder of Sozo Sports
- Dick McCormick – former U.S. soccer midfielder
- Jim Mora – former NFL head coach
- John Olerud – former MLB first baseman
- Timothy Omundson – professional actor, currently on Psych (USA Network)
- Scott Pelluer – former NFL linebacker
- Steve Pelluer – former NFL quarterback
- Matt Pitman – former public address announcer of the NBA's Seattle SuperSonics
- Chuck Swirsky – radio play by play announcer of the NBA's Chicago Bulls
- Greg Whiteley – film director, producer, and writer
- Nancy Wilson – co-leader (with sister Ann) of the band Heart
- Michael Wilton – lead guitarist for the Grammy-nominated band Queensrÿche
- Brian Wood – anchor and reporter for KATU-TV in Portland, Oregon
