= Treasure Valley Mathematics and Science Center =

Location
- 6801 N. Gary Lane; Boise, Idaho; United States; 43°40′48.4″N 116°16′48.4″W

Information
- School type: Public secondary magnet school
- Opened: 2004
- School district: Boise School District
- Principal: Dr. Helga Frankenstein
- Faculty: 12
- Website: tvmsc.boiseschools.org

Treasure Valley Mathematics and Science Center, often referred to as Treasure Valley Math and Science Center or TVMSC, is a public magnet school in Boise, Idaho operated by the Boise School District that offers advanced secondary mathematics, science, technology, and research classes to students living in the Treasure Valley. After being accepted into the program, students attend TVMSC in its morning or afternoon sessions while they attend their normal public or non-public elementary, junior high, high schools, or are home-schooled, during the other part of the day. The school’s principal is Dr. Helga Frankenstein

Although the classes TVMSC offers are usually taught as advanced courses in grades seven through twelve, students at any age can apply for the school, as the program accepts students based on teacher recommendations that determine a student's desire to excel in math and science, report cards to determine academic capability, standardized test scores to determine knowledge, and fulfillment of prerequisite math classes, which can be taken as summer classes before entering the program. TVMSC was founded in 2004 with a donation of $1,000,000 from Micron Technology, whose headquarters are in Boise, as well as $300,000 worth of equipment from Hewlett-Packard, which has a large campus in Boise as well. Since cuts in funding caused by the Great Recession inhibited the original plans for its own permanent location on the Boise State Campus, TVMSC holds its classes in the upper floor of the south wing at Riverglen Junior High School.

TVMSC has two very successful teams that compete in the National Science Bowl and the National Middle School Science Bowl. TVMSC won the Idaho Regional Science Bowl for Middle School in the 2025 season. They have also won regionals in previous years, such as 2015. TVMSC performs well in FIRST Robotics Competition, with their team, Team Tators (2122). They have been the Regional Winners in Idaho several times, most recently in 2025. Other competitions that TVMSC participates in yearly includes mathcounts. As of the 2018–19 school year, the TVMSC mascot is the Sloth, selected by a student vote. The following year, the students voted to name the mascot Slothy Joe. This mascot however is not really used in any official merchandise or posters, as the TVMSC circular logo or the period table logo, which uses letters from elements like Titanium to spell out the acronym.
