= St. Andrew's Episcopal School (Amarillo, Texas) =

- Entrance to St. Andrew's Episcopal School

Location
- 1515 S. Georgia St. Amarillo, Potter County, Texas 79102; United States
- Coordinates: 35.197988°N 101.865908°W

Information
- Type: Private
- Denomination: Episcopal
- Patron saint: Saint Andrew
- Founded: 1951
- Status: Active
- Head of school: Jessica Morris
- Chaplain: Father Jared Houze
- Grades: Primer – 8
- Age: 3 year olds+
- Average class size: 11
- Mascot: Broncos
- Accreditation: National Association of Independent Schools, Southwestern Association of Episcopal Schools, National Association of Episcopal Schools

St. Andrew's Episcopal School is a private school located in Amarillo, Texas, United States, providing education from primer to grade 8. The school was founded in 1951. In December 2010, the Plainview (Texas) Daily Herald described St. Andrew's as "regarded among the [Texas] Panhandle's finest private schools."

== History ==
St. Andrew’s Episcopal School was founded in 1951 by Betty and Lee Bivins, who perceived a need for a faith-based kindergarten. They were the parents of Teel Bivins, born four years earlier, who was later to become a United States Ambassador to Sweden and a Texas State Senator.

The school opened as one kindergarten class conducted in the basement of St. Andrew’s Church. Betty Bivins' sister, Margaret Teel, was the first teacher. Additional grades were added in later years, until 1990 when the first eighth grade class graduated. At one time in the 1950s, student transfers from St. Andrew's to the public schools of the Amarillo Independent School District were restricted due to a school district regulation against accepting private school transfer credits for students who had been taught by a first-grade teacher over 65 years old.

By the 1980s the school purchased additional property for a new facility to accommodate its growing enrollment. A new main building was completed in 1985, including classrooms, a library, a gymnasium, a computer lab, a cafeteria, and other special purpose rooms. A second new building, named The Margaret Teel Early Childhood Building, opened in 1999. An expansion completed in January 2008 added more classrooms, an assembly hall, a new library dedicated to the middle school grades, a commons area, and areas for visual arts, orchestra, and music.

Jessica Morris became the most recent headmaster in July 2023.

== Academics ==
By the time students graduate from the 8th Grade they have accumulated at least five high school credits. Students at St. Andrews do not take the Texas Assessment of Knowledge and Skills (TAKS) that is required by all public schools in Texas but they do take the Stanford Achievement Test and the Otis-Lennon Test. In October 2010, the National Junior Honor Society inducted 18 seventh-grade and eighth-grade students into the society. To be induced the students must have maintained a 95 average in all subjects and have also demonstrated leadership, character, citizenship and service.

St. Andrew’s is a member of the National Association of Independent Schools and the National Association of Episcopal Schools. St. Andrew's is fully accredited by the Southwest Association of Episcopal Schools, an organization approved by Texas Private School Accreditation Commission (TEPSAC), and recognized by the Texas Commissioner of Education.

== National Middle School Science Bowl ==
The National Middle School Science Bowl (NMSSB) is a middle school academic competition held in the United States. It includes an academic competition, in which teams of four students compete to answer various science-related questions, and for several years it included the Hydrogen Fuel Cell Model Car Challenge, in which students design, build, and race model cars powered by hydrogen fuel cells. The NMSSB has been organized and sponsored by the United States Department of Energy since the competition's inception in 2002. St. Andrew's has won regional competitions to advance to the national science bowl in 2005, 2007, 2008, 2009, and 2010, and has placed well for several years in the national competitions. In 2005, a St. Andrews team placed second overall in the national competition; in 2008 a team from the school placed third overall.

St. Andrew's ranks in national hydrogen fuel cell car competition
2009 - First Place
2008 - First Place
2007 - First Place
2005 - Second Place

St. Andrew's ranks in national academic competition
2008 - Third Place
2005 - Second Place

== Sports ==
St. Andrew's interscholastic teams compete against other junior-high-age teams in the High Plains Christian Athletic Association in football, volleyball, basketball, golf, and track. The school terminated the employment of its athletic director, who also served as volleyball coach, in December 2010 after allegations of improper behavior, but expected to continue its sports program without interruption. The coach was later arrested and charged with a crime. In the time span of 2019-2021, the St. Andrews Broncos obtained 7 championships. 2 football, 2 basketball, 2 track, and 1 volleyball.

== Notable alumni ==
- Teel Bivins, member of the Texas State Senate and United States Ambassador to Sweden
