= Perfect Chaos =

Perfect Chaos: a daughter's journey to survive bipolar, a mother's struggle to save her
- First edition cover
- Author: Linea Johnson; Cinda Johnson
- Language: English
- Publisher: St. Martin's Press
- Publication date: May 8, 2012
- Publication place: United States
- Media type: Print (hardcover), e-book
- Pages: 336
- ISBN: 978-0-312-58182-4 (hardcover)
- OCLC: 865109474

Perfect Chaos is a 2012 memoir co-written by Linea Johnson and her mother, Cinda Johnson. The book follows a mother-daughter journey of the struggle of the diagnosis and living with bipolar disorder and depression.

== Summary and composition ==
The book chronicles author Linea Johnson's onset of depressive episodes starting in high school, and leading into her first year away from home in college, when she is hospitalized for the first time and diagnosed with bipolar II disorder. The story shares her perspective of being treated with the illness and suicide attempts, and also, the perspective of her mother, Cinda Johnson, a mental health professor at Seattle University.

Perfect Chaos is narrated by both Linea and Cinda Johnson, as well as a collection of essays and journal entries by the mother and daughter pair. The book started out as Linea Johnson's chronicling her moods as a part of her treatment and recovery, and Cinda's suggestion that they share their story after witnessing inequities in the treatment of the disorder.

== Reception ==
Perfect Chaos has received positive reviews from the literary and disability community, as well as scholars in the mental health community. Glenn Close, whose sister was diagnosed with bipolar disorder in 2004, called said the book's "emotional transparency moved [Close] to [her] core and deepened [her] empathy for all those touched by mental illness".

Kirkus Reviews said that the book is "a no-holds-barred 'biography of depression,' ... a simultaneously painful and inspiring page-turner".

In a 2012 Publishers Weekly review, the reviewer said of Perfect Chaos, "The journey for Linea and her family is a moving and hopeful one, as they better understand how she reacts to the illness, and realize that being bipolar is only a part of someone’s life, not the whole."

Patrick J. Kennedy, a former Member of Congress with bipolar disorder, received the book positively saying the authors, "brilliantly light a path to hope, understanding, and acceptance as they smash through the stigma of brain illness."

HuffPost referred to Perfect Chaos as "honest, raw and inspiring."

In an academic review, Charmaine Crockett, special projects coordinator at the Center on Disability Studies at the University of Hawaiʻi at Mānoa, examined Perfect Chaos for its criticism on mental healthcare for the uninsured and underprivileged and stigma around mental illness. Crockett referred to the book as a welcome addition to the community, saying it enriches "the intersection between disability studies, mental health and literature."
