= Matt Pitman =

American sports announcer

Matt Pitman is an American public address announcer. He was the public address announcer for the Golden State Warriors of the National Basketball Association (NBA) from 2019 to 2024, and previously for the Seattle SuperSonics and the Seattle Storm of the WNBA.

== Career ==
Pitman began his career in his native Seattle, working as a radio host and reporter for KIRO (AM). In this role, he covered Seattle's major professional sports teams, including contributing to pre- and post-game broadcasts for the Seattle Mariners.

In 2004, he became the public address announcer for the Seattle SuperSonics, replacing Jim Graci. He held this role until the team's relocation in 2008. During his time with the SuperSonics, Pitman also became the announcer for the Seattle Storm in 2006, a role he continued for 13 seasons.

In August 2019, the Golden State Warriors hired Pitman as their public address announcer for their move to the Chase Center in San Francisco. In 2022, it was announced that the video game NBA 2K22 would feature the real-life public address announcers, including Pitman, for all 30 NBA teams.

In September 2024, Pitman announced on social media that his contract with the Warriors would not be renewed for a sixth season.
