= Somerset, Washington =

Neighborhood in Bellevue, Washington, USA

Coordinates: 47.5561°N 122.1588°W

The location of King County in Washington is highlighted in red (King County is where Somerset is located).

Somerset is a neighborhood in Bellevue, Washington. It contains Forest Ridge School of the Sacred Heart, Eastgate Park, and Somerset Elementary School. The hill called Somerset tops out just under 1,000 feet.

Somerset began construction of the first of its 22 divisions incorporating more than 1,200 homes in the early 1960s. The last division was completed in the late 1970s. Somerset has nationally recognized schools, and the Somerset Recreation Club, which provides recreational and competitive swim and tennis programs.

The Somerset Community Association is a group representing neighborhood interests and offering various interest groups, including a singles group for those 50 and older, a "Sunshine Committee" to send cards and fix meals for ailing residents, and a covenant review committee. The neighborhood has an active landscape program, a Block Watch and an Emergency Preparedness Program.

Most of Somerset was annexed by Bellevue in 1967. Other neighborhoods in the Somerset area including Hilltop, Horizon View, and Tamara Hills, were unincorporated until they were annexed by Bellevue in 2012.
