= History of Link light rail =

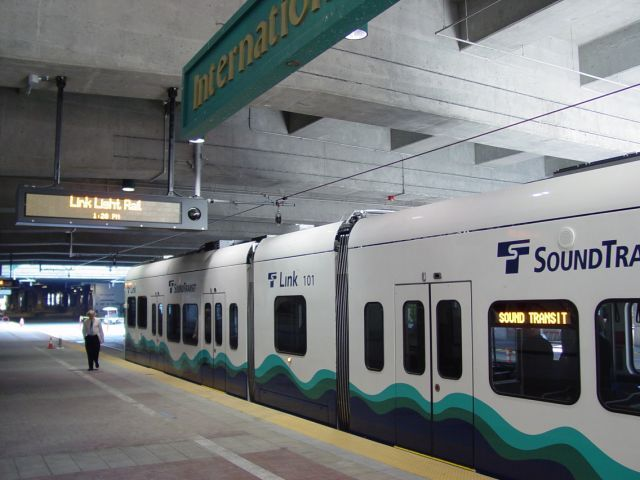
First trains on a test run in the Downtown Seattle Transit Tunnel

Link light rail in the Seattle metropolitan area of Washington is a light rail system managed by Sound Transit since its inception in 1996. As of 2025, it consists of the 1 Line, the 2 Line, and the T Line; with several extensions under construction and other lines in planning.

The first lines were approved by a ballot measure in 1996, but a series of financial missteps and planning errors resulted in escalating costs and delayed construction for Central Link (now the 1 Line). The 21-mile line was shortened to a 14-mile line running from Westlake Center in downtown Seattle south to Seattle–Tacoma International Airport, and opened in 2009. Federal grants received in 2005 funded a northern extension to the University of Washington in 2016. Further funding extended the line south to Angle Lake in 2016, and north to Northgate in 2021.

Further ballot measures Sound Transit 2 (ST2) in 2008 and Sound Transit 3 (ST3) in 2016 have funded further expansions, as well as the construction of new lines across the region that will total 116 miles (187 km) by 2041. Construction is underway on the 2 Line, which will open in two phases: from South Bellevue to the Microsoft campus in Redmond in 2024; and to Seattle in 2026. Other ST2 projects include an extension north to Lynnwood to open in 2024 and south to Federal Way in 2025. Future extensions to be built with ST3 funding to Tacoma, Issaquah, and Everett are scheduled to open by 2044.

== Predecessors ==
Attempts to finance the construction of a rapid transit system to connect Seattle's neighborhoods, and later other cities in the region, first emerged with civil engineer Virgil Bogue's comprehensive plan in 1911. A referendum on the plan, which included 33 miles (53 km) of subway tunnels and 27 miles (43 km) of elevated tracks, was rejected by city voters the following year. The region's transit system faced chronic under-investment and declining bus ridership as new highways and freeways, including Interstate 5 through Seattle, were constructed to serve a growing number of automobile users.

Rapid transit in Seattle was reconsidered as part of the Forward Thrust ballot measures placed on the ballot in 1968. The 1968 vote featured 13 different ballot measures, including options for only Seattle and for all of King County. The rapid transit ballot measure failed at the ballot box. Four of these measures, including the rapid transit measure, was placed on the ballot again in 1970, but all four failed a second time. After the failed vote in 1970, the federal transit funding instead went to build the MARTA system in Atlanta.

The Seattle Transit System, which operated buses within the city, launched one of the nation's first express bus systems in 1970. The program drew new suburban riders but the system continued to face financial issues. King County voters approved a ballot measure in 1972 to acquire the Seattle Transit System and a private suburban operator to form a new countywide bus system that would be managed by the Municipality of Metropolitan Seattle, an existing water treatment and sewage agency. The bus system, named Metro Transit (now King County Metro), began operations in January 1973 and increased ridership from 30 million with Seattle Transit in 1971 to 66 million in 1980.

Prior to the inauguration of the Link system, King County built a system of large underground tunnels beneath the city of Seattle. At the time of their construction, these tunnels carried the busses operated by King County Metro Transit. These tunnels provided a convenient grade-separated alignment for transit through downtown Seattle.

== Early years ==
In 1990, the state of Washington allowed transit agencies in the Puget Sound region to form regional transit committees by the January 1, 1991. The State further enabled these regional transit committees to form regional transit authorities to succeed the committees. It pushed for the development of the structure and financing plan underpinning these authorities to be finalized by September 1, 1992. The same law also required subsequent approval by county authorities and voters. Sound Transit was formed in 1993 as a Regional Transit Authority (RTA) spanning the urban areas of King, Pierce, and Snohomish counties.

=== Light rail ===
==== Creation ====
Sound Transit submitted its first transit plan and associated tax increases for voter approval on March 14, 1995. This plan was rejected by voters. On November 5, 1996, a scaled-back plan, called "Sound Move" was submitted for voter approval. This plan was approved by voters. The approved plan included increases in sales taxes and vehicle excise taxes to pay for a US$3.9 billion transit package that included $1.7 billion for a 25-mile light rail system. The system included a streetcar in Tacoma, Washington which would become the T Line, and another line from the University District in north Seattle to Sea-Tac Airport south of Seattle, originally planned to open in 2006. Sound Transit released an environmental impact study in 1998 which saw costs for the system rise to US$2.2 billion, and which added three miles to the line by extending it to Northgate.

==== Designing the system ====
The feasibility of regional light rail in the Puget Sound was studied throughout the 1980s. Alternative transit systems, such as heavy rail, which had been the centerpiece of the Forward Thrust measure, were subsequently reassessed. Light rail was ultimately chosen over heavy rail for its comparative cost-effectiveness and versatility.

While the Link system was initially designed around a 750 VDC traction electrification system., Sound Transit later instead opted to design the system around a 1500 VDC system, though it retained traction electrification. Few transit systems in the United States use 1500 VDC despite prevalence internationally. This system was chosen because some initial Link stations were expected to experience unusually high daily ridership numbers despite system limitations on the number of cars per train and a lack of grade separation along parts of the line. Sound Transit calculated that the use of 1500 VDC rather than 750 VDC would result in an increase in the cost of acquisition of train cars to be 3% higher, though the change also resulted in cost savings in other respects, including the need for a reduced number of substations.

== Early Issues ==
The decision to have the line run at grade through the Rainier Valley was met with objections from some local residents, who formed a group called Save Our Valley, which advocated for the Link to run below ground like much of the rest of the route starting at Beacon Hill. Save Our Valley alleged in a lawsuit that the decision to go with a cheaper option with greater community impacts through their majority-minority neighborhood violated federal environmental, housing, and civil rights laws. City leaders of Tukwila, also south of Seattle, were concerned that route bypassed the shopping district around Southcenter Mall.

A vote by the Sound Transit board on February 25, 1999, that made minor modifications to the route, did little to ease the concerns in Seattle's southern neighborhoods and northern suburbs. Increasing land values and changes to the route voted in by the board added hundreds of millions of dollars to the cost, requiring cuts to the plan to bring the project back to within budget. The cuts were finalized in a November vote that deferred construction on two stations, to only partially build the station under Beacon Hill, and route modifications. The Save Our Valley lawsuit was dismissed in 2003, and planning proceeded for the original street level alignment.

In late February 1999, a financial analysis stated that building light rail out as far as Northgate might not be possible for over 12 years due to decreases in federal grant money and local tax shortfalls. Sound Transit then planned to move extension of the line to Northgate to a new second phase of construction. In June of that year, Sound Transit publicly announced that the remaining planned first phase of construction would overrun its planned budget by hundreds of millions of dollars.

=== University of Washington ===
Differences between the University of Washington and Sound Transit over station locations, impacts from the route's running under several science buildings on the campus, and construction impact deferments threatened to delay the project and raise costs. After months of negotiations, university leaders and Sound Transit reached agreement in April 2000 with Sound Transit agreeing to install dampeners on the rails that run under the science buildings, install air cushions to tables in the science buildings, and mitigate environmental impacts due to construction and traffic impacts from having the station on university grounds. However, in November 2000, the Sound Transit board voted to defer construction on the tunnel to the university when the construction estimate came in $171 million over budget. This news prompted concerns that Sound Transit could lose out on $500 million in federal grants, but King County Executive Ron Sims said he had been in contact with Federal Transit Administration (FTA) officials who said the grant was still possible. This announcement coincided with the resignation of light rail's chief, Paul Bay. Two weeks later, Lyndon Wilson Jr., the man credited with turning around Portland's MAX Light Rail project, was tapped as the systems interim director.

Within days of Wilson's arrival, new estimates from Sound Transit staff increased the cost of the 21-mile project from $1.9 billion to $3.8 billion and added three years to the construction time. The report cited the frequent changes made to the route in order to appease community members, third parties, and the wishes of board members and the ambitious construction schedule as reasons for the cost increase. Just days later, Capitol Hill business and civic leaders withdrew their support from the project due to concerns that two years of construction needed to build the station on Capitol Hill would drive customers away from area businesses and force those businesses to close.

In January 2001, the Sound Transit board agreed in advance to accept a then-future fixed $500 million grant from the FTA were the FTA to approve such a grant after the review of the project; Sound Transit was required to approve the grant prior to its contingent issuance. The decision effectively locked Sound Transit into building a 7-mile route from Lander Street to the University of Washington. Days later, the chairman of the House Appropriations Transportation subcommittee, Representative Hal Rogers, sent a letter to Transportation Secretary Rodney Slater saying his committee could not approve the grant and requesting a review by the Inspector General. Despite this, Sound Transit was still optimistic that the grant would be approved later that week. Representative Jennifer Dunn, Washington's ranking House Republican, voiced her support for the independent audit, but stopped short of calling for the FTA to not approve the grant. Despite these questions, on his last day as Transportation Secretary, Rodney Slater, signed the agreement granting Sound Transit $500 million in annual installments through 2006. Shortly after obtaining the grant approval, Sound Transit's executive director, Bob White resigned, citing a need for new leadership to restore public confidence in the agency.

=== Declining support ===
On March 9, Sound Transit's citizen oversight committee criticized the agency's optimistic assumptions about building costs, its reliance on receiving an additional $931 million in federal grants, and that the agency was in danger of repeating prior mistakes. The next day, Hal Rogers summoned Sound Transit and its opponents to Washington, D.C. to testify in front of his subcommittee about the "problem" project. By the end of March, Link light rail was in danger of losing its first installment of federal grant money as Rogers noted the project's local opposition, cost overruns, and reliance on federal money as troubling.

In April, the Seattle City Council's support for the project began to falter when a proposal requesting a Sound Transit citizen panel to explore alternatives to light rail was proposed by Councilman Nick Licata. The proposal would have had little to no effect on Sound Transit's plans if it had passed in its proposed form, but by the time it passed the contents of the proposal had been replaced with language praising the agency and explaining the cost overruns as unavoidable and out of Sound Transit's control. However, the next day the US Inspector General's office recommended that federal funding be suspended until the agency was able to provide a final estimate for the project. The Inspector General's report also estimated the cost of the project at $4.1 billion, meaning the cost of the project had increased by $2.5 billion in seven months. The day after the Inspector General's report brought a suspension of the $75 million federal grant for the next year, Sound Transit learned that the $50 million grant from the current year was also in danger.

=== Shortening of the line ===
On April 9, 2001, Mayor Paul Schell sent a letter requesting that due to the challenges facing the northern segment of the route (South Lander Street to the University District), Sound Transit should focus on building the southern fourteen miles of the line. Schell's proposal was supported by mayoral election rival Greg Nickels and King County Commissioner Ron Sims, but Sims also suggested continuing the line beyond South Lander and into the Metro Bus Tunnel. However, Councilman Nick Licata was of the opinion that Schell's proposal didn't go far enough because it did not consider scrapping light rail completely and focusing the money on carpool lanes and expanding the monorail.

Part of Schell's request was for the review board to find out if it would be possible to build the southern route without federal assistance, but within days Sound Transit's acting executive director said federal assistance would still be required, an opinion that was echoed by the acting light-rail director. The day after saying the southern route could not be built without federal money, Sound Transit stated that its current plans for light rail were no longer feasible due to a decrease in the amount of money it expected to get from the federal government, which caused at least a $190 million shortfall. However, Sound Transit had hope that with modifications to the route, stations, or the amount of tunneling, the full 21 miles could still be built. By the end of the month, Sound Transit staffers revealed that it was unlikely that the whole project could be completed before the end of the decade, but some of it could be completed.

A poll conducted by Elway Research for The Seattle Times and Northwest Cable News between April 28 and May 1 revealed that 40 percent of Puget Sound voters wanted to put a stop to a project, 37 percent wanted to build a smaller line with existing funds, and 14 percent were in favor of increasing taxes to pay for the full line. This contrasts with when Sound Move passed in 1996. At that time, 54 percent of Seattle residents favored stopping the project.

By late May 2001, Sound Transit's board began to seriously consider shortening the line, including what to do with the money allocated to light rail if it was scrapped. Support in the board began to form around four alternative plans, two of which included a tunnel through Capitol Hill that divided the board, with Ron Sims saying "Taking us to Capitol Hill is fatal to any light-rail project". Sims would later join a group of current and former community leaders in sending a letter to the board urging them to develop a route through South Lake Union to avoid the tunnel through Capitol Hill.

In June, it was announced that two key staff members would be leaving the project: interim director Lyndon Wilson, and chief engineer Bill Houppermans. Two current staffers were chosen as interim replacements. The board decided to instruct staffers to focus their attention on building the southern segment of the line in late June and to provide alternatives to choose from by September. Supporters of the plan noted that by building the southern segment, Sound Transit would be showing that they were able to get infrastructure built and that once it was built, money and support would follow. Critics said that focusing on the southern segment the line wouldn't attract as many riders and that major population and job centers would not be serviced.

== Revitalization ==
The decision to shorten the line from 21 miles to 14 miles marked a turning point for the embattled project. While the path to completion would not be trouble-free, Sound Transit would at least make progress towards starting construction.

Sound Transit received some good news in July 2001 when a federal court judge dismissed a lawsuit brought by Rainier Valley residents who were opposed to the at-grade alignment through their neighborhood, alleging environmental, housing, and racial discrimination.

Light rail would soon have competition to provide mass transit to Seattle. All three of the major candidates for mayor of Seattle in 2001 endorsed a monorail project despite no details being known about the project. According to the head of the University of Washington's Transportation Research Center, "Maybe the best thing going for monorail is that it's not light rail." However, while the Seattle Monorail Project would ultimately pass a referendum in 2002, it too would be plagued by many of the same cost overruns and delays that afflicted Link Light Rail and in 2005, Seattle residents voted against a new plan and killed the monorail project.

In September 2001, the Sound Transit Board announced that they had enough money to fund a 14-mile route, later to be called Central Link, that began in Downtown Seattle at the Washington State Convention and Trade Center, proceeded through Downtown in the Metro Transit Tunnel, then through Rainier Valley and Tukwila before ending one mile short of Sea-Tac Airport. The decision to stop this "starter" line a mile short of the airport would later be criticized by light rails opponents, but the explanation provided by Sound Transit was that it was that the designs were not completed for a planned remodel of Sea-Tac and that they only had $12 million to extend the line when the projected cost to do so was between $350 million and $500 million. An audit by Deloitte & Touche discovered that while Sound Transit was much better than before, it still ran a risk of cost overruns by not having better procedures to control scope creep.

On September 25, the Sound Transit Board finally voted to approve the new, shorter, 14-mile line with an estimated cost of $2.1 billion, clearing the way for construction to begin as early as the summer of 2002. While concerns were raised that the project was wasting money, others noted that it was time to get construction started. The line was officially approved on November 29, but some opponents threatened lawsuits to stop construction.

At the end of 2001 and beginning of 2002, the project encountered more conflict. After having most of their lawsuit dismissed by a federal judge in mid-July and then dropping the remainder in August, the Rainier Valley community group filed an appeal on December 26, stating the judge had incorrectly ruled when dismissing the discrimination claims. Tim Eyman, a political activist known in Washington for filing anti-tax initiatives and referendums, filed an initiative that would remove an excise tax on car tabs that goes to transit, while another group of opponents threatened a referendum to block light rail from using the Downtown bus tunnel. The result of the initiative, if passed, would remove $67 million of funding from Sound Transit's $270 million annual income. Yet another group questioned the legality of the shortened line, urged Sound Transit to have another public vote, and threatened legal action if Sound Transit did not listen to its urging. Sound Transit declined the request citing that they would be required to pay for both their court costs and their opponents, bonds were not needed for another two years, and the legal proceedings would tie Sound Transit's hands politically.

In late January 2002, Sound Transit began working to repair their image in the nation's capital and paid a visit to federal officials to show that the project had left behind its problems from the previous year.

Ron Sims, Sound Transit's chairman, announced that it may be possible to extend the line to the University of Washington without raising taxes as long as route modifications to the route saved enough money, they were able to get help from the federal government, and their financial plans were changed to allow more borrowing. The route to the university had previously been narrowed down to two options both with tunnels under Lake Washington Ship Canal, one under Montlake Cut and another near University Bridge.

== Construction ==
=== 1 Line ===
In March 2002, Sound Transit began the process of acquiring land in the Rainier Valley, including all of 64 properties and parts of 232 others. Sound Transit was also informed that Link Light Rail received a rating of "Recommended" from the Federal Transit Administration, making it eligible for federal funding. The Seattle City Council and King County made over $50 million in investments in the neighborhood to compensate for the light rail, including paying off small business loans, burying power lines, and other community developments.

==== Temporary Link Light Rail Airport Connector Bus ====
Sound Transit contracted with Pierce Transit to operate an interim shuttle bus from the initial endpoint of Central Link at Tukwila International Blvd Station to SeaTac/Airport Station until the extension to the airport was finished. Pierce Transit was awarded the contract in February 2009, as an expansion of their contract to operate a connector bus between Tacoma Dome Station and Lakewood Station. This service ran every ten to fifteen minutes in both directions until the end of the day on December 19, 2009, when direct light rail service to the airport commenced.

==== Opening ====
The 1 Line from Tukwila International Boulevard to Downtown Seattle (Westlake) opened in July 2009, followed closely by the final station at Seattle-Tacoma International Airport in December 2009. The extension from Downtown to the University of Washington via Capitol Hill opened March 19, 2016. Angle Lake station, planned as a Sound Transit 2 project, also opened in 2016. The Northgate extension opened three stations simultaneously at the U District, Roosevelt, and Northgate in October 2021.

Construction on the Federal Way Link Extension began in 2020 and opened in December 2025.

=== 2 Line ===
Construction of Line 2 began on April 22, 2016. As part of the construction, a number of homes in the Surrey Downs neighborhood were demolished, businesses were relocated, and lanes on the Interstate 90 floating bridges across Lake Washington were adjusted. Construction was delayed by the COVID-19 pandemic, and issues with substandard concrete work on sections of the line led to further delays. A legal dispute between Microsoft and Sound Transit, as well as a strike by concrete truck workers further delayed construction in downtown Redmond specifically.

The 2 Line opened from South Bellevue to Redmond Technology in April 2024. Then, a connection across Lake Washington through Mercer Island to Seattle opened in March 2026. The Lynnwood Link Extension opened in August 2024 with three new stations and 8.5 miles of new track, connecting Lynnwood City Center to Northgate via Mountlake Terrace. An infill station on NE 130th St. (Pinehurst) is still under construction.

=== T Line ===
Construction on the T Line began in August 2000. A formal groundbreaking was held on October 18, 2000, shortly after the commencement of Sounder commuter rail service to Tacoma Dome Station. After disputes with Qwest and BNSF Railway, the T line opened on August 22, 2003. From November 2018 until September 2023, Sound Transit built an extension of the T-line to Tacoma's Hilltop Neighborhood. As of 2026, Sound Transit plans to begin work on a further extension of the T Line from its Hilltop terminus to Tacoma Community College and connect the T Line to regional light rail via Tacoma Dome Station.

== Bibliography ==
- Barnett, Erica C. (November 17, 2005). "Fast-Lane Fallacy". The Stranger.
- Boyer, Tim (December 21, 2000). "Transit doubt runs deep on Capitol Hill". The Seattle Times.
- Brune, Tom; Serrano, Barbara A.; Vinh, Tan (January 27, 1999). "The light-rail transit plan -- On wrong track? -- Many people who live and work along Martin Luther King Jr. Way South believe the current transit plan unfairly favors residents of North Seattle". The Seattle Times.
- Brunner, Jim (April 4, 2001). "Light rail survives attack: City Council rejects anti-Sound Transit move". The Seattle Times.
- Brunner, Jim (June 29, 2001). "Sound Transit looks south for its first line". The Seattle Times.
- Brunner, Jim (April 30, 2002). "Millions OK'd for Rainier Valley to mitigate effects of light rail". The Seattle Times.
- Cohen, Josh (November 28, 2017). "Sound Transit (King, Pierce, and Snohomish counties)". HistoryLink.
- Cohen, Josh (November 28, 2017). "Regional Transit Authority (RTA) board convenes for first time on September 17, 1993". HistoryLink.
- Corvin, Aaron (March 19, 2002). "Sound Transit faces safety issues with light rail". The News Tribune.
- Crowley, Walt (1993). Routes: An Interpretive History of Public Transportation in Metropolitan Seattle. Seattle: Crowley Associates. OCLC 31996584.
- Crowley, Walt (September 15, 2000). "Bus service begins in downtown Seattle transit tunnel on September 15, 1990". HistoryLink.
- Crowley, Walt (September 24, 2000). "Voters in King, Snohomish, and Pierce counties reject regional transit plan on March 14, 1995". HistoryLink.
- Fryer, Alex (November 19, 1999). "A milestone for light rail -- Regional board selects station sites, alignment". The Seattle Times.
- Garber, Andrew (April 6, 2000). "UW rail tunnel gets boost". The Seattle Times.
- Garber, Andrew (June 24, 2001). "How Sound Transit dug itself a hole with tunnel". The Seattle Times. p. A1.
- Garber, Andrew (November 17, 2000). "Price puts tunnel on hold". The Seattle Times.
- Garber, Andrew (January 12, 2001). "Sound Transit votes to take $500 million". The Seattle Times.
- Garber, Andrew (January 18, 2001). "Congressman wants to delay light-rail money". The Seattle Times.
- Garber, Andrew (January 19, 2001). "Dunn backs rail-project review". The Seattle Times.
- Garber, Andrew (January 20, 2001). "Half-billion allocated for Sound Transit". The Seattle Times.
- Garber, Andrew (March 9, 2001). "Its own watchdog bites Sound Transit; panel fears light-rail budget unrealistic". The Seattle Times.
- Garber, Andrew (March 10, 2001). "Light rail labeled 'problem' project". The Seattle Times.
- Garber, Andrew (March 30, 2001). "Federal aid in jeopardy for light rail". The Seattle Times.
- Garber, Andrew (April 5, 2001). "Suspension of light-rail funds urged". The Seattle Times.
- Garber, Andrew (April 6, 2001). "Sound Transit troubles, Day 2". The Seattle Times.
- Garber, Andrew; Brunner, Jim (April 10, 2001). "Schell: Put South End segment of light rail first". The Seattle Times.
- Garber, Andrew (April 12, 2001). "Federal help needed even if light rail starts south". The Seattle Times.
- Garber, Andrew (April 13, 2001). "Light rail can't be built as planned". The Seattle Times.
- Garber, Andrew (April 27, 2001). "Light rail can't be finished by 2009". The Seattle Times.
- Garber, Andrew (May 20, 2001). "Light-rail talk grim: Time to cut losses?". The Seattle Times.
- Garber, Andrew (May 25, 2001). "Capitol Hill tunnel splits transit panel". The Seattle Times.
- Garber, Andrew (June 15, 2001). "Rail agency is urged to skip tunnel". The Seattle Times.
- Garber, Andrew (June 6, 2001). "Sound Transit losing two of its key people". The Seattle Times.
- Garber, Andrew (July 17, 2001). "Light-rail suit cut down: Judge tosses out most claims made by Rainier Valley group". The Seattle Times.
- Garber, Andrew (August 28, 2001). "Major mayoral hopefuls climb aboard monorail". The Seattle Times.
- Garber, Andrew (September 28, 2001). "Shorter light-rail line OK'd". The Seattle Times.
- Garber, Andrew (September 26, 2001). "Light rail lite goes to vote tomorrow; 1st leg would link Seattle, Tukwila". The Seattle Times.
- Garber, Andrew (September 27, 2001). "Sound Transit's budget warning". The Seattle Times.
- Garnick, Coral (August 26, 2016). "Construction disruption: Here's some of the impact East Link light rail is having on Bellevue businesses". Puget Sound Business Journal.
- Gilmore, Susan (May 6, 2001). "Thin majority still backs some light rail". The Seattle Times.
- Grass, Michael (March 23, 2016). "With Seattle's long-awaited transit expansion now reality, it's full steam ahead". Route Fifty. Atlantic Media.
- Hagey, Jason (February 7, 2002). "Legal fight threatens to slow light rail". The News Tribune.
- HistoryLink Staff (September 19, 2002). "Voters reject rail transit plan and three other Forward Thrust bond proposals on May 19, 1970". HistoryLink.
- Hockett, Charlie (February 1, 2021). "East Link: You asked, we answer". The Platform. Sound Transit.
- Kelleher, Susan (September 13, 2001). "Sound Transit says it can build 14-mile line; light rail stops short of airport". The Seattle Times.
- Kershner, Jim (2019). Transit: The Story of Public Transportation in the Puget Sound Region. Seattle: HistoryLink. ISBN 9781933245553. OCLC 1084619121.
- Lindblom, Mike (August 23, 2003). "Sound Transit starts small with Tacoma Link system". The Seattle Times.
- Lindblom, Mike (January 26, 2016). "University Link light-rail service starts March 19". The Seattle Times.
- Lindblom, Mike (June 1, 2017). "Mercer Island braces for new I-90 bottlenecks as light-rail work begins". The Seattle Times. Archived from the original on June 19, 2017.
- Lindblom, Mike (March 24, 2020). "Sound Transit sues longtime ally Microsoft in effort to condemn land for Redmond light rail". The Seattle Times.
- Lindblom, Mike (September 26, 2021). "Light rail ready to open at Northgate, transforming more than just commutes". The Seattle Times.
- Lindblom, Mike (August 18, 2022). "More delays for light rail to Bellevue, Redmond, Federal Way, Lynnwood". The Seattle Times.
- Lindblom, Mike; Banner, Ellen (April 14, 2023). "Bad light-rail ties on I-90 bridge can't be fixed, must be rebuilt". The Seattle Times.
- McRoberts, Patrick (January 1, 1999). "King County voters on Forward Thrust bonds approve stadium and aquarium and nix transit on February 13, 1968". HistoryLink.
- Murakami, Kery (June 3, 1999). "Rising costs for light rail may require further cuts". The Seattle Times.
- Murakami, Kery (July 1, 1999). "Sound Transit is $216 million short -- Project's initial phase may be scaled back further". The Seattle Times.
- Pemberton-Butler, Lisa (January 13, 1999). "Hearings to begin on light-rail line". The Seattle Times.
- Pham, Kinh; Eacker, Richard; Burnett, Margaret; Bardsley, M. (2000). A step forward or backward? Sound Transit opts for 1500 VDC traction electrification. 2000 ASME/IEEE Joint Railroad Conference. IEEE. pp. 67–72. doi:10.1109/RRCON.2000.869989.
- Pryne, Eric (April 11, 2001). "Sims agrees: Start light rail in South End". The Seattle Times.
- Pryne, Eric (November 30, 2001). "Sound Transit adopts 14-mile route; light-rail construction could start in summer". The Seattle Times.
- Pryne, Eric (December 27, 2001). "Rail-line foes file appeal of ruling". The Seattle Times.
- Pryne, Eric (January 9, 2002). "Rail foes threaten to try referendum". The Seattle Times.
- Pryne, Eric (February 5, 2002). "Light-rail foes open new battle". The Seattle Times.
- Pryne, Eric (February 15, 2002). "Light-rail route options in north narrowed to two". The Seattle Times.
- Pryne, Eric (March 1, 2002). "Rail foes push for court ruling, but Sound Transit declines to test its own legality". The Seattle Times.
- Pryne, Eric (March 2, 2002). "Sims: Light rail might reach U District without new taxes". The Seattle Times.
- Pryne, Eric (March 15, 2002). "Sound Transit gets green light to buy land for light rail". The Seattle Times.
- Quigg, David; Wickert, David (January 31, 2003). "Big trains may yield to progress, light rail". The News Tribune.
- Sailor, Craig (July 13, 2023). "Yes, you are seeing regular trolleys on new Hilltop line. But don't try to catch a ride". The News Tribune.
- Sanchez, Roberto (January 28, 2000). "All aboard? UW dickers on light rail". The Seattle Times.
- Schaefer, David (November 8, 1996). "Voters Back Transit Plan On Fourth Try". The Seattle Times.
- Schaefer, David (December 4, 1998). "Big plans for light rail -- Sound Transit suggests 24-mile route from SeaTac to Northgate". The Seattle Times.
- Schaefer, David (February 26, 1999). "Rail route creates hard feelings -- Northern cities, Rainier Valley, Tukwila feel slighted". The Seattle Times.
- Schaefer, David (February 23, 1999). "Light rail to Northgate? Maybe not for 12 years -- Report says finances, limited taxing authority might delay expansion". The Seattle Times.
- The Seattle Times (December 13, 2000). "Light-rail cost soars $1 billion". The Seattle Times.
- The Seattle Times (January 23, 2001). "Sound Transit executive director resigns". The Seattle Times.
- The Seattle Times (January 8, 2002). "Revised I-776 launched". The Seattle Times.
- The Seattle Times (January 23, 2002). "Sound Transit officials, Seattle mayor visit nation's capital". The Seattle Times.
- Sound Transit. "East Link Extension: Project map and summary". Sound Transit.
- Sound Transit. "Lynnwood Link Extension: Project map and summary". Sound Transit.
- Sound Transit. "Federal Way Link Extension: Project map and summary". Sound Transit.
- Sound Transit. "TCC T Line Extension". Sound Transit.
- Sound Transit (November 1999). Central Link Light Rail Transit Project: Final Environmental Impact Statement (PDF) (Report). Sound Transit.
- Sound Transit (October 6, 2000). "Opening of expanded Tacoma Dome Station, start of Tacoma Link light rail construction to be celebrated" (Press release). Sound Transit.
- Sound Transit (October 2, 2001). "Federal judge dismisses final claim in SOV lawsuit" (Press release). Sound Transit.
- Sound Transit (August 20, 2002). "Federal government gives major green light to Central Link light rail project" (Press release). Sound Transit.
- Sound Transit (February 19, 2009). Motion No. M2009-20: Airport Connector Bus Service Contract (PDF) (Report). Sound Transit.
- Sound Transit (August 12, 2009). "Link light rail airport connector bus" (PDF). Sound Transit. Archived from the original (PDF) on June 17, 2011.
- Sound Transit (April 23, 2015). "Sound Transit, Bellevue moving forward with East Link" (Press release). Sound Transit. Archived from the original on September 7, 2015.
- Sound Transit (April 22, 2016). "Sound Transit kicks off East Link light rail construction" (Press release). Sound Transit. Archived from the original on April 25, 2016.
- Sound Transit (November 19, 2018). "Sound Transit breaks ground on Hilltop Tacoma Link Extension" (Press release). Sound Transit.
- Sound Transit (September 10, 2021). "Roosevelt history lives on at new light rail station". The Platform. Sound Transit.
- Sound Transit (February 2023). 2023 System Expansion Progress Report (PDF) (Report). Sound Transit.
- Sound Transit (March 28, 2026). "Link light rail opens across Lake Washington" (Press release). Sound Transit.
- Sound Transit Board (February 25, 1999). Motion M99-14: Identifying the locally preferred alternative for alignment and station locations for the Central Link light rail line (PDF) (Report).
- Szymanski, Jim (September 25, 2000). "Construction pinches Freighthouse". The News Tribune.
- Tu, Janet I. (August 10, 2001). "Rainier Valley group drops claim against Sound Transit". The Seattle Times.
- United States Court of Appeals for the Ninth Circuit (2003). "Save Our Valley v. SEPA". FindLaw.
- Viriyincy, Oran (2013). "Seattle Bus Tunnel". Back to the Future: A History of Transit Planning in the Puget Sound Region (PDF) (Report). University of Washington College of Built Environments.
- Washington State Legislature. "RCW 81.104.040: Policy development in central Puget Sound—Voter approval". Washington State Legislature.
- Washington State Legislature (March 31, 1992). "Engrossed Substitute House Bill 2610: Regional transportation authorities" (PDF).
- Wodnik, Bob (May 29, 1993). "Transit plan for region is approved". The Everett Herald – via Newspapers.com.
- Yardley, William (April 4, 2016). "Seattle continues quest to get greener as it grows with 'transformative' light-rail expansion". Los Angeles Times.
- Zetts, Cindy (November 29, 2000). "Sound Transit taps Portlander". The Seattle Times.
