= Aline =

Aline may refer to:

- Aline (given name), a feminine given name
  - Aline (footballer, born 1982) (Aline Pellegrino), Brazilian footballer
  - Aline (footballer, born 1989) (Aline Reis), Brazilian footballer
  - Aline (footballer, born 2005) (Aline Gomes), Brazilian footballer

== Places ==
- Aline, Idaho, United States, first settlement of the Latter-day Saints movement, now a ghost town
- Aline, Oklahoma, United States, a town
- Loch Aline, Scotland
- 266 Aline, a main belt asteroid

== Music ==
- Aline (band), French musical pop rock group, formerly Young Michelin
- "Aline" (song), a 1965 song by Christophe

== Other uses ==
- Aline (film), a 2021 French Canadian drama film about Céline Dion

== See also ==
- A-line (disambiguation)
