= Kent Des Moines station =

Light rail station in Kent, Washington

66 Kent Des Moines
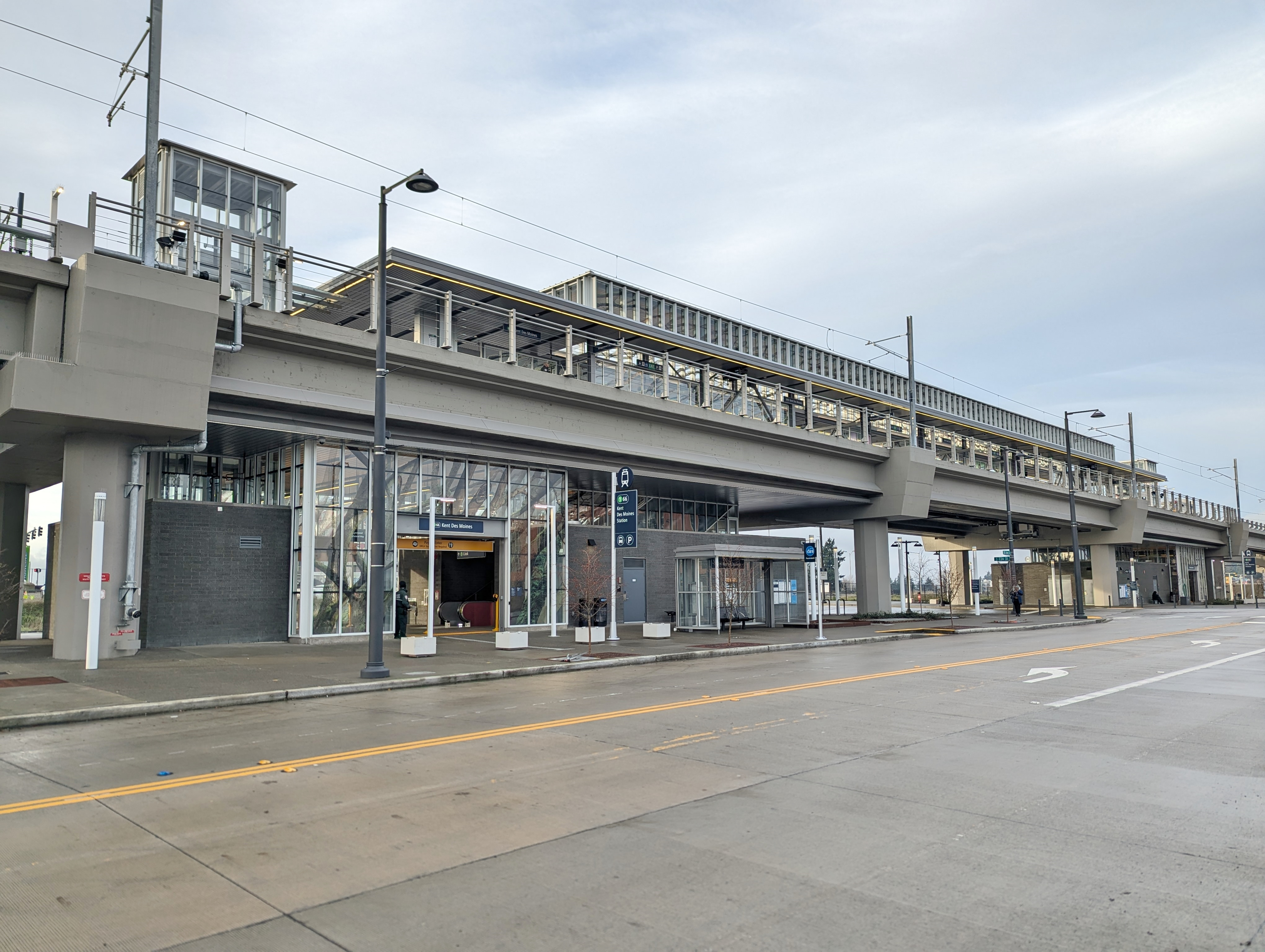
- The station's east side on 30th Avenue South

General information
- Location: 23461 30th Avenue South; Kent, Washington; United States
- Coordinates: 47°23′22″N 122°17′40″W
- System: Link light rail
- Owner: Sound Transit
- Platforms: 1 island platform
- Tracks: 2
- Connections: King County Metro (RapidRide A Line)

Construction
- Structure type: Elevated
- Parking: 500 spaces
- Cycle facilities: Racks and lockers
- Accessible: Yes

History
- Opening: December 6, 2025

Services
Preceding station	Sound Transit	Following station
Link
Angle Lake toward Lynnwood City Center	1 Line	Star Lake toward Federal Way Downtown
Location

Kent Des Moines station is a station on the 1 Line, part of Sound Transit's Link light rail system. It is located in western Kent, Washington, near Highline College and the intersection of State Route 99 and State Route 516. It opened on December 6, 2025, as part of the Federal Way Link Extension, a project that extended the 1 Line to Federal Way.

== Location ==
Kent Des Moines station is an elevated structure above 30th Avenue South, east of State Route 99 (Pacific Highway) near its intersection with State Route 516 (Kent-Des Moines Road). The station is located adjacent to Highline College and has a 500-stall parking garage and several temporary surface parking lots that are planned to be redeveloped. The area around the station is planned to be redeveloped with transit-oriented mixed-use development under the "Envision Midway" plan proposed by the city of Kent.

A shopping center to the south of the station was considered for the line's operations and maintenance facility, but the Kent city government passed a zoning ordinance in January 2019 to prevent its use—in part because the shopping center includes a recently opened Dick's Drive-In.

In 2022, the station was officially named Kent Des Moines, replacing its working name of Kent/Des Moines. The name was recommended ahead of Highline station and Highline College station following public polling. The extension's opening was delayed to late 2025 due to construction issues on the section between Kent Des Moines and Star Lake stations; a potential early opening for Kent Des Moines was discussed at a Sound Transit meeting in 2023 due to the expected completion of the station in late 2024.
