= A Line =

A Line or A-line may refer to:

== Transport ==
=== United States ===
- A (Los Angeles Railway), a former streetcar service in California
- A (New York City Subway service), a rapid transit line
- A Line (Los Angeles Metro), a light rail line in Los Angeles County, California
- A Line (RTD), a commuter rail line in Colorado
- A Line (Valley Metro), a light rail line in Arizona
- Metro A Line (Minnesota), a bus rapid transit line in Minneapolis-Saint Paul, Minnesota
- RapidRide A Line, a bus route in King County, Washington
- Atlantic Coast Line Railroad, a former railroad in the southern US
  - Main Line (Atlantic Coast Line Railroad)

=== Other countries ===
- A-Line (Hamilton), a planned rapid transit line in Hamilton, Ontario, Canada
- Line A (Buenos Aires Underground), in Argentina
- RER A, a commuter rail line in Paris, France

== Other uses ==
- A-line (clothing), a style of skirt or dress
- Arterial line, a thin catheter inserted into an artery
- A-line, a finding in medical ultrasound of the lung
- A-line bob, one of several bob cut types

== See also ==
- A–A line
- Aline (disambiguation)
- Line A (disambiguation)
- Line (disambiguation)
