= Star Lake station =

Light rail station in Kent, Washington

67 Star Lake
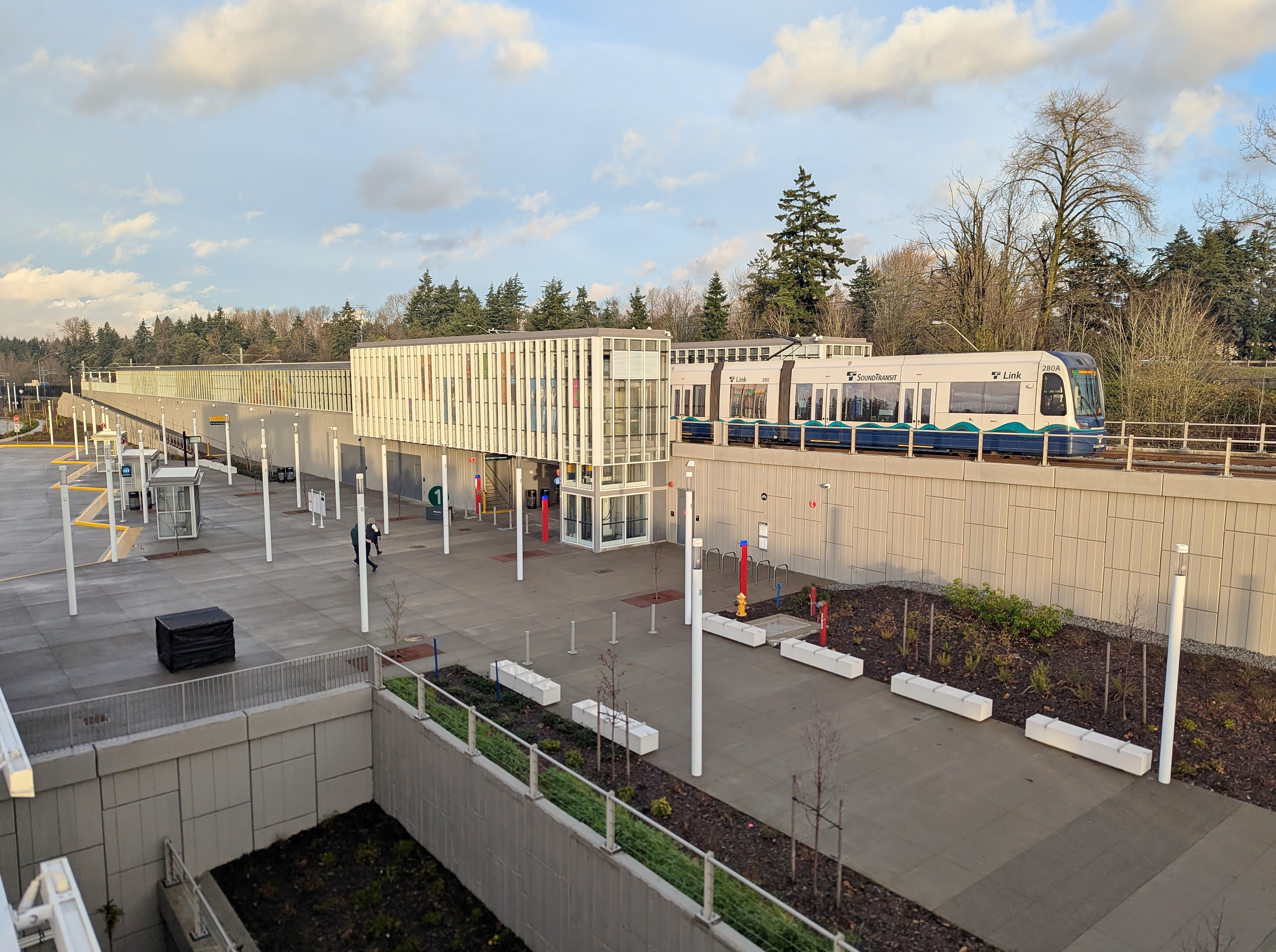
- The station's entrance viewed from the parking garage

General information
- Location: 27002 26th Avenue South; Kent, Washington; United States
- Coordinates: 47°21′33″N 122°17′52″W
- System: Link light rail
- Owner: Sound Transit
- Platforms: 2 side platforms
- Tracks: 2
- Connections: King County Metro, Sound Transit Express

Construction
- Structure type: Elevated
- Parking: 1,100 spaces
- Cycle facilities: Racks and lockers
- Accessible: Yes

History
- Opening: December 6, 2025

Services
| Preceding station | Sound Transit | Following station |
Link
| Kent Des Moines toward Lynnwood City Center | 1 Line | Federal Way Downtown Terminus |
Location

Star Lake station is a light rail station in southwestern Kent, Washington, United States. It is part of the Link light rail system, operated by Sound Transit, and was constructed for the Federal Way Link Extension. The station is located at the existing Star Lake Park and Ride, adjacent to the intersection of Interstate 5 and South 272nd Street.

Construction of the station was originally approved by voters in the 2008 Sound Transit 2 ballot measure, but deferred two years later after a funding shortfall. The Sound Transit 3 ballot measure, passed in 2016, re-instated funding and approval for the station, as well as an extension to Federal Way Transit Center. The extension opened on December 6, 2025.

== History ==
Star Lake station has platforms on an elevated embankment attached to a 1,100-stall parking garage near the intersection of Interstate 5 and South 272nd Street. The existing park-and-ride at the site, opened in January 1981 by Metro Transit, closed on March 22, 2020, to prepare for light rail construction on the site.

An alternative option that was not chosen as the preferred route in July 2015 would have placed the station at the intersection of State Route 99 and South 272nd Street, closer to the Redondo neighborhood in Des Moines.

The station's location was finalized in January 2017, after negotiations with Federal Way Public Schools over the impacts to an elementary school on the south side of South 272nd Street. The school district planned to construct a new elementary school at the Redondo Park and Ride on State Route 99, while the current site would be used for light rail construction. The plan was contingent on the passage of a bond measure in 2018, which was passed by voters.

In 2022, the station was officially named for Star Lake, replacing its working name of South 272nd Street.
