= A Train =

A Train may refer to:

== Rail transport ==
- The A (New York City Subway service)
- A Division (New York City Subway)
- A-train (Texas), a hybrid rail line in Denton County, Texas
- A-Train (JR Kyushu), a train operated in Japan by JR Kyushu
- A-Train (Korail), a tourist train in South Korea
- MTR Adtranz–CAF EMU, a train operated in MTR Hong Kong
- Green Line A branch, in Boston, Massachusetts
- Key System, electric line between Oakland and San Francisco in 1958
- Hitachi A-train, trains made by Hitachi
- Arlanda Express, an airport rail link operated in Stockholm by A-Train AB
- A Line (Los Angeles Metro), a light rail line in Los Angeles County, California
- A Line (RTD), a commuter rail line in Denver, Colorado

== Sports nickname for ==
- Mike Alstott (born 1973), American football player
- Matt Bloom (born 1972), American professional wrestler
- Artis Gilmore (born 1949), former basketball player
- Anthony Kelly (lacrosse) (born 1980), professional lacrosse player
- Anthony Thomas (American football) (born 1977), American football player
- Anton Volchenkov (born 1982), ice hockey defenceman
- Aaron Williams (basketball) (born 1971), professional basketball player

== Other ==
- A-Train, a 1985 series of video games
- A-train (satellite constellation), a string of meteorological and environmental Earth observation satellites
- A-Train, a supervillain-turned-superhero from the media franchise The Boys

== See also ==
- "Take the "A" Train", 1939 jazz standard written by Billy Strayhorn
- Take the "A" Train (Betty Roché album), released 1956
- Take the "A" Train (Dexter Gordon album), released 1989
- Line A (disambiguation)
