= Federal Way Link Extension =

Future light rail expansion in King County, Washington

The Federal Way Link Extension is a Link light rail extension of the 1 Line in Seattle, Washington that travels 7.8 miles (12.6 km) south from Angle Lake station to Federal Way, along the west side of Interstate 5. It was approved in 2008, but scaled back in 2010 to terminate at Kent Des Moines station. The Star Lake and Federal Way Downtown stations were re-instated in 2016, with the passing of Sound Transit 3. The project began construction in 2020 and opened on December 6, 2025, at a cost of $2.5 billion.

== History ==
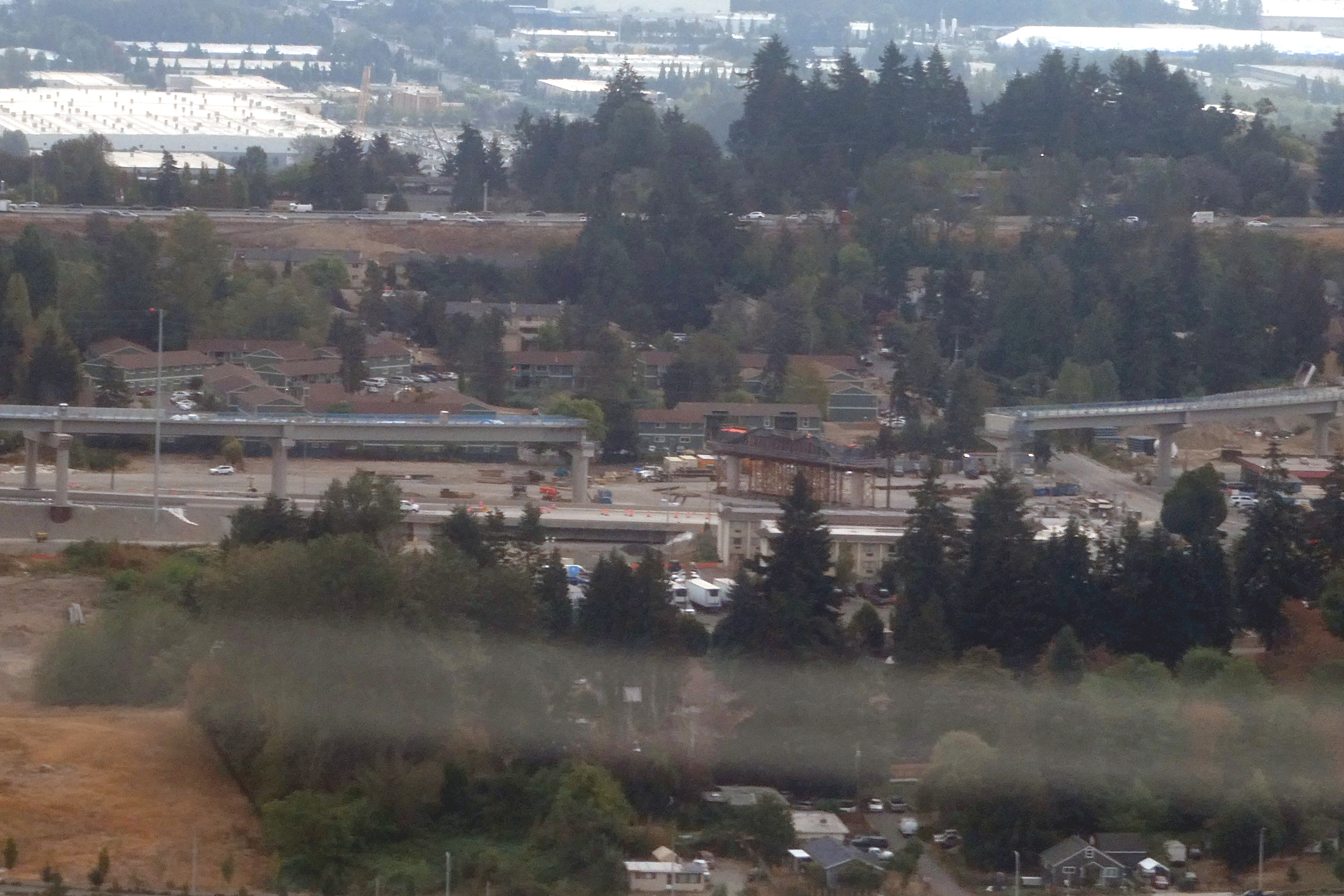
Construction south of Angle Lake in 2022

In November 2008, voters approved funding for the segment between Sea-Tac Airport and Redondo/Star Lake at South 272nd Street. However, reduced tax revenue as a result of the economic recession led Sound Transit to suspend all work south of Angle Lake Station (South 200th Street) in December 2010. Construction on the South 200th Link Extension to Angle Lake station began in April 2013. Angle Lake station opened to the public on September 24, 2016.

On July 23, 2015, the Sound Transit Board selected their preferred alternative for the Federal Way Link Extension, routed along the west side of Interstate 5 with three stations serving Highline College, the Star Lake park and ride and Federal Way Transit Center. Funding for preliminary engineering on the southern segment was restored in February 2016, allowing for planning to resume. The Sound Transit 3 ballot measure was passed by voters in 2016, including funding and approval to open Federal Way Link in 2024, from Angle Lake to Federal Way Transit Center via Star Lake and Kent Des Moines. The final alignment for the line was chosen in January 2017, with an agreement signed with Federal Way Public Schools to move an elementary school near South 272nd Street station (now Star Lake station).

In July 2018, the project's estimated cost was revised to $2.55 billion, due to land acquisition costs and limited availability of suitable contractors. The Federal Transit Administration awarded a $790 million grant and $629 million loan to Sound Transit for the project in December 2019. Construction began in early 2020, which was commemorated with a virtual groundbreaking ceremony due to the COVID-19 pandemic. The movable forms used on sections of the project were reused from the Tilikum Crossing project on the MAX Light Rail system in Portland, Oregon. The final girders connecting to the existing guideway at Angle Lake station were placed in April 2022. Sound Transit adopted the official names for the project's three stations in June 2022.

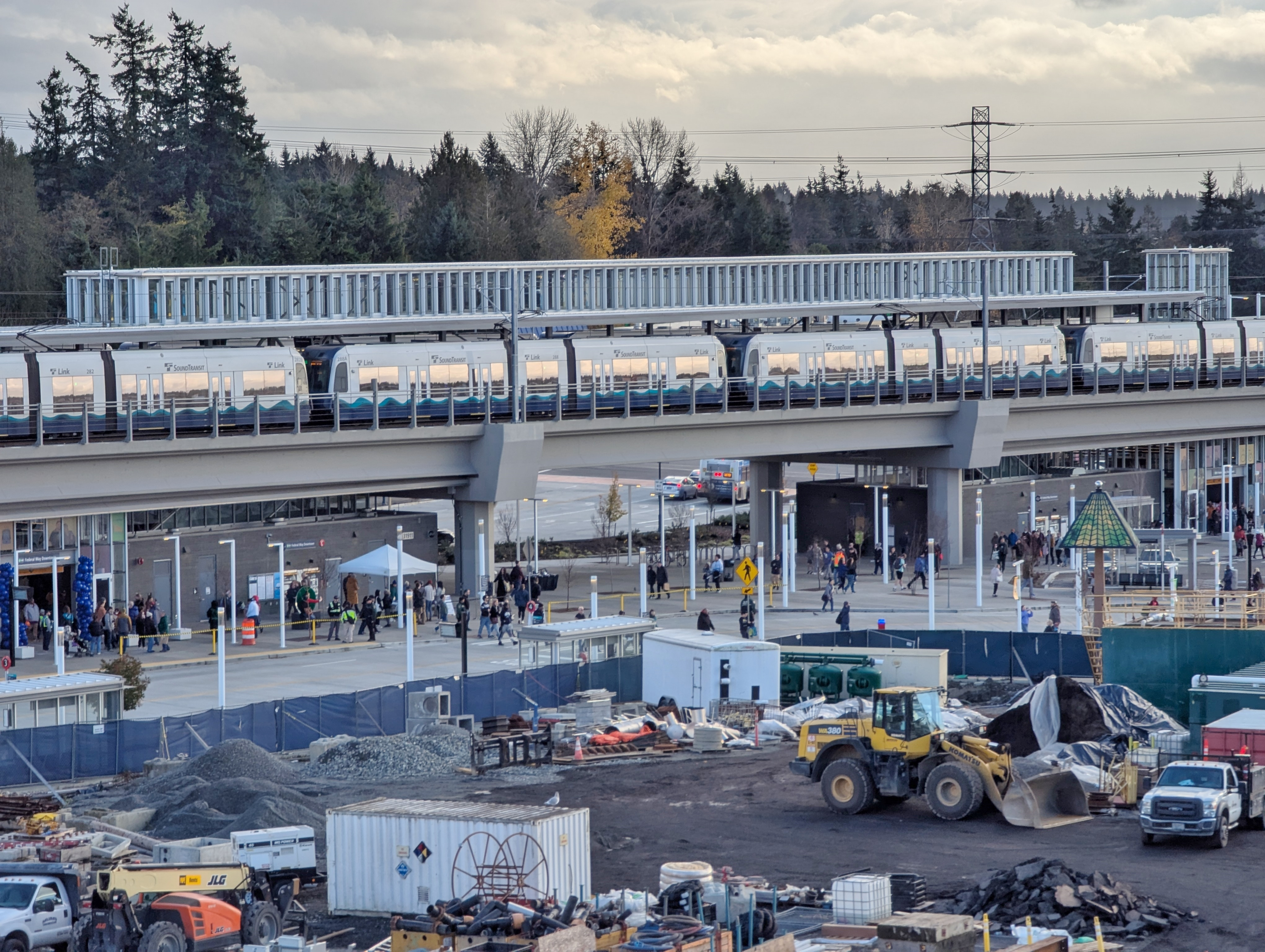
Federal Way Downtown station after its completion

The start of light rail service to Federal Way was pushed back to 2026 due to several issues, including a four-month strike by concrete truck drivers and issues discovered during construction. A section between Kent/Des Moines and Star Lake stations was redesigned to use a 500-foot (150 m) elevated span due to unstable soils in a wetland along Interstate 5. The wetlands had been the site of a mudslide that closed a freeway lane in July 2022 and has a high risk of soil liquefaction during seismic events. The balanced cantilever bridge is the longest span on the Link light rail system and was buried by soil after it was completed in late 2024.

The opening of the Federal Way Link Extension was moved to December 6, 2025, due to work that was completed ahead of schedule. Sound Transit rescheduled the opening date in July 2025 in response to proposals from South King County politicians. It was swapped with that of the 2 Line between Seattle and Bellevue, which was delayed due to construction issues.

== Route ==
From Angle Lake station, the terminus of the South 200th Link Extension, the line travels southeast along the planned State Route 509 freeway extension to Interstate 5. From there, trains run on the west side of I-5, serving Highline College at Kent Des Moines station, and a park-and-ride at Star Lake station (South 272nd Street), before ending at the Federal Way Downtown station. The tracks continue beyond the station to a parking lot south of South 320th Street, where the Tacoma Dome Link Extension would begin construction. The Federal Way Extension is planned to carry 18,000 to 23,000 daily passengers by 2028.

A new operations and maintenance facility is planned to be constructed to support operations of the future Tacoma Dome Link Extension with candidate sites near Kent Des Moines station or southern Federal Way. The proposed Kent Des Moines site at the former Midway Landfill replaced an earlier proposal that was withdrawn after public concerns over the displacement of a Dick's Drive-In. A site in southern Federal Way occupied by a megachurch was chosen as the preferred alternative in 2021 and confirmed by the Sound Transit board in 2024.

== Stations ==
Name	City/Neighborhood	Location	Planned Year
Angle Lake	Seatac	International Blvd and S 200th St	2016
End of South 200th Link Extension
Kent Des Moines	Kent, Des Moines	Pacific Highway S and Kent-Des Moines Rd	2025
Star Lake	Federal Way	Pacific Highway S and S 272nd St	2025
Federal Way Downtown	Federal Way	23rd Ave S and S 317th St	2025
