= Angle Lake (Washington) =

Urban lake in SeaTac, Washington

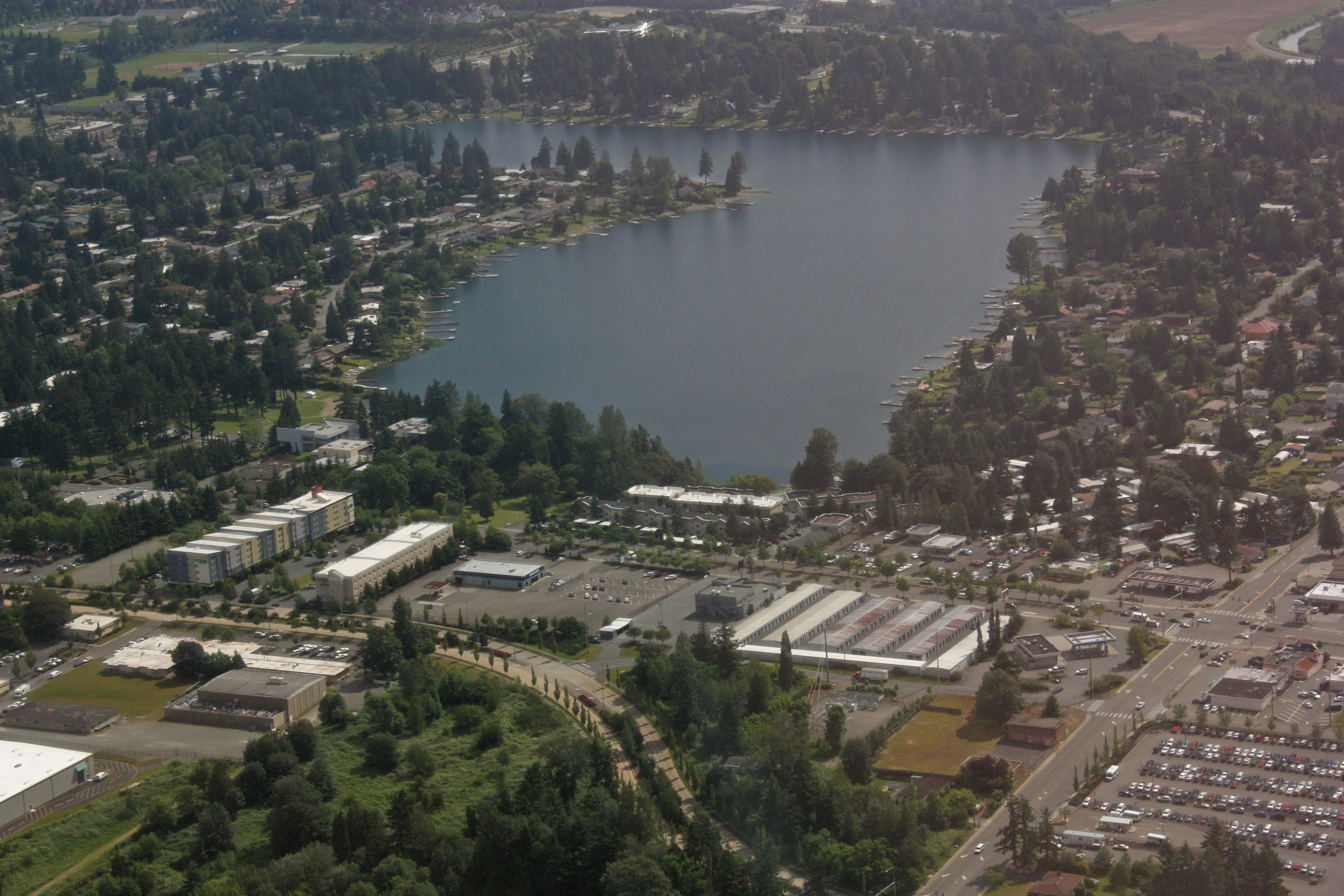
- Aerial view of Angle Lake, looking from the west

- Location within Washington (state) Location within the United States
- Location: SeaTac, Washington, United States
- Coordinates: 47°25′41.11″N 122°17′8.62″W
- Type: Glacial lake
- Basin countries: United States
- Surface area: 102 acres (41 ha)
- Max. depth: 52 ft (16 m)
- Surface elevation: 367 ft (112 m)

Angle Lake is an L-shaped lake in SeaTac, Washington, United States, occupying 102 acres (0.41 km^{2}) between Interstate 5 and State Route 99. The lake most likely was so named on account of its outline, which forms a right angle. Like nearby Lake Burien and Bow Lake, it was formed by the glacial retreat roughly 12,000 years ago.

On the western shore is a 10-acre (0.040 km^{2}) park, Angle Lake Park, administered by the City of SeaTac Parks and Recreation department. The remainder of the shoreline is ringed with private homes. The Angle Lake light rail station is named for the lake, and is located to the southwest.

The lake is stocked with rainbow trout by the Washington Department of Fish and Wildlife. It is also home to kokanee, largemouth bass, crappie, catfish, and yellow perch. The lake is open to fishing year-round.

Angle Lake was home to an annual fireworks show and hydroplane races on Independence Day until 2024, when both were replaced by a drone show due to a complaint filed by a resident, who cited a 1932 Washington Supreme Court ruling. During the first drone show, 55 of the 200 drones lost their GPS signals and descended into the lake, rendering them unusable.

== Park ==
Angle Lake Park was established in the 1920s as the private Angle Lake Plunge resort. The Park was acquired by King County in 1957 becoming the public Angle Lake Park. After the City was formed the County transferred the ownership of Angle Lake Park to the City of SeaTac. The entrance to the park is off International Boulevard (State Route 99), 0.8 miles (1.3 km) from Seattle–Tacoma International Airport. It includes 371 feet (113 m) of the lake shore, with a swimming area, fishing pier, picnic areas and public boat launch.

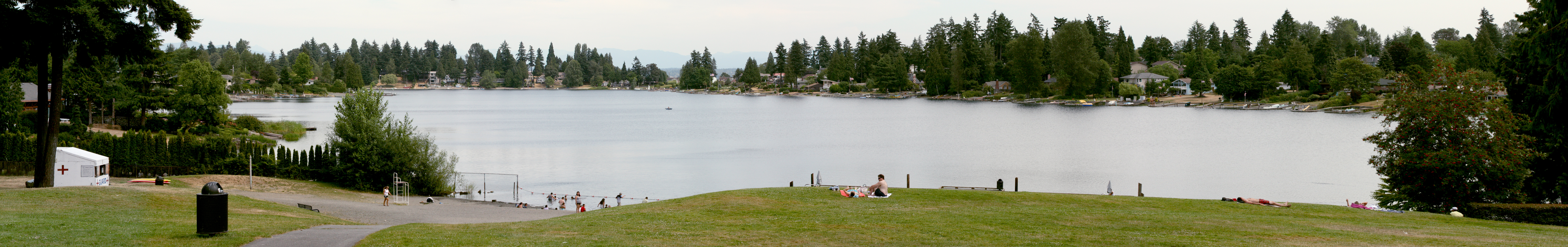
