= Line A =

Line A may refer to:

- A (Los Angeles Railway), a former streetcar service in California, United States
- A (New York City Subway service), in New York, United States
- Line A (Buenos Aires Underground), in Argentina
- Line A (Prague Metro), in the Czech Republic
- Line A (Rome Metro), in Italy
- Mexico City Metro Line A, in Mexico
- Santiago Metro Line A, a planned line in Chile
- Bilbao tram, in Bilbao, Spain, originally called Line A
- Réseau express métropolitain, designated as line A, a light metro in Greater Montreal, Quebec

== See also ==
- A Line (disambiguation)
- A Train (disambiguation)
