= Aline, Idaho =

Coordinates: 43.7891°N 111.1786°W

Aline was the first settlement of Latter-day Saints in what is today Teton County, Idaho. It was formed in 1888 and the Aline ward became known as the Pratt ward, named after its first bishop, a son of Parley P. Pratt. However, by 1901 it was overshadowed as the main town by Driggs, Idaho and virtually ceased to exist.
