= Angle Lake station =

Light rail station in SeaTac, Washington

65 Angle Lake
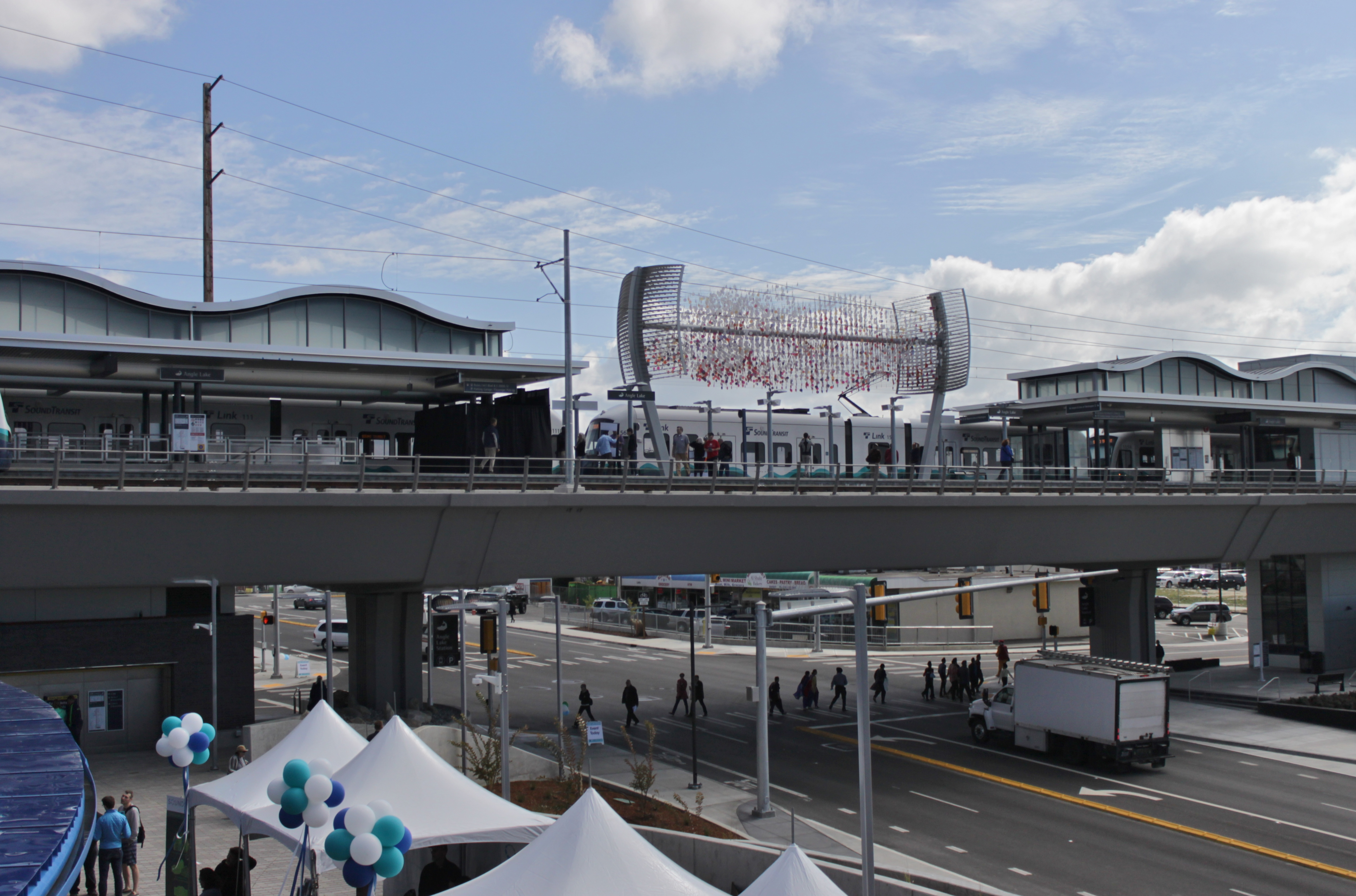
- The station on its opening day, September 24, 2016

General information
- Location: 19935 28th Avenue South; SeaTac, Washington; United States
- Coordinates: 47°25′22″N 122°17′51″W
- System: Link light rail
- Owner: Sound Transit
- Platforms: 1 island platform
- Tracks: 2
- Connections: King County Metro (RapidRide)

Construction
- Structure type: Elevated
- Platform levels: 2
- Parking: 1,160 spaces (garage and surface)
- Cycle facilities: Racks and lockers
- Accessible: Yes

History
- Opened: September 24, 2016

Passengers
- 5,000 daily weekday boardings (2025); 1,813,320 total boardings (2025)

Services
| Preceding station | Sound Transit | Following station |
Link
| SeaTac/Airport toward Lynnwood City Center | 1 Line | Kent Des Moines toward Federal Way Downtown |
Location

Angle Lake station is a light rail station in SeaTac, Washington. It is served by the 1 Line, a Link light rail line that is managed by Sound Transit in the Seattle metropolitan area. The elevated station also includes a large parking garage.

The station was built as part of the South 200th Link Extension project, extending the light rail line south from its terminus at SeaTac Airport via a 1.6-mile-long (2.6 km) elevated guideway. The project was originally approved by voters in the 1996 "Sound Move" ballot measure, with a promise to open in 2006, but was deferred when funding was not found. The 2008 "Sound Transit 2" campaign was approved with funding for the station and extension, estimated to open in 2020; federal grants were obtained to accelerate design and construction, moving up the opening date to late 2016.

The station was originally referred to as the South 200th Street station, but was officially named for the nearby lake in December 2012 by the Sound Transit Board. Construction on the extension began in May 2013 and on the station in September 2014; the project was budgeted at $383 million. Angle Lake station opened to the public on September 24, 2016, and served as the southern terminus of the 1 Line until December 2025.

== Location ==
Angle Lake station is located above the intersection of South 200th Street and 28th Avenue South in SeaTac, southeast of the Seattle–Tacoma International Airport and a block west of International Boulevard (State Route 99). The elevated station spans South 200th Street on the west side of 28th Avenue South, with two entrances on each side of the street.

The eponymous Angle Lake is located northeast of the station, with a public park on the lake's western shore accessible via International Boulevard. To the west of the station, the Des Moines Creek Trail connects the area to Des Moines via a 2.5-mile-long (4.0 km) gravel trail.

=== Transit-oriented development ===
Angle Lake station is located in an area consisting of single-family homes, apartment buildings, retail spaces, office buildings, airport parking lots and hotels; a population of approximately 3,886 people live within a 1/2 mile (0.80 km) radius of the stations. The area is home to a Federal Detention Center, the corporate headquarters of Alaska Airlines, and several hotels that provide a majority of the estimated 7,459 jobs. A parking lot for airport users southwest of the station entrances is planned to be redeveloped into a new city hall and civic campus for SeaTac. The lot was acquired by the city government in 2025.

In July 2015, the city of SeaTac adopted a station area plan to direct potential transit-oriented development in a 171-acre (69 ha) around the station. The plan determined that much of the vacant land near the station has great potential for development, excluding right-of-way reserved for a future freeway extension of State Route 509. The plan recommended allowing buildings over five stories tall and amenities for non-motorized transportation (bicycles and pedestrians) for the city government to consider in a zoning code update.

== History ==
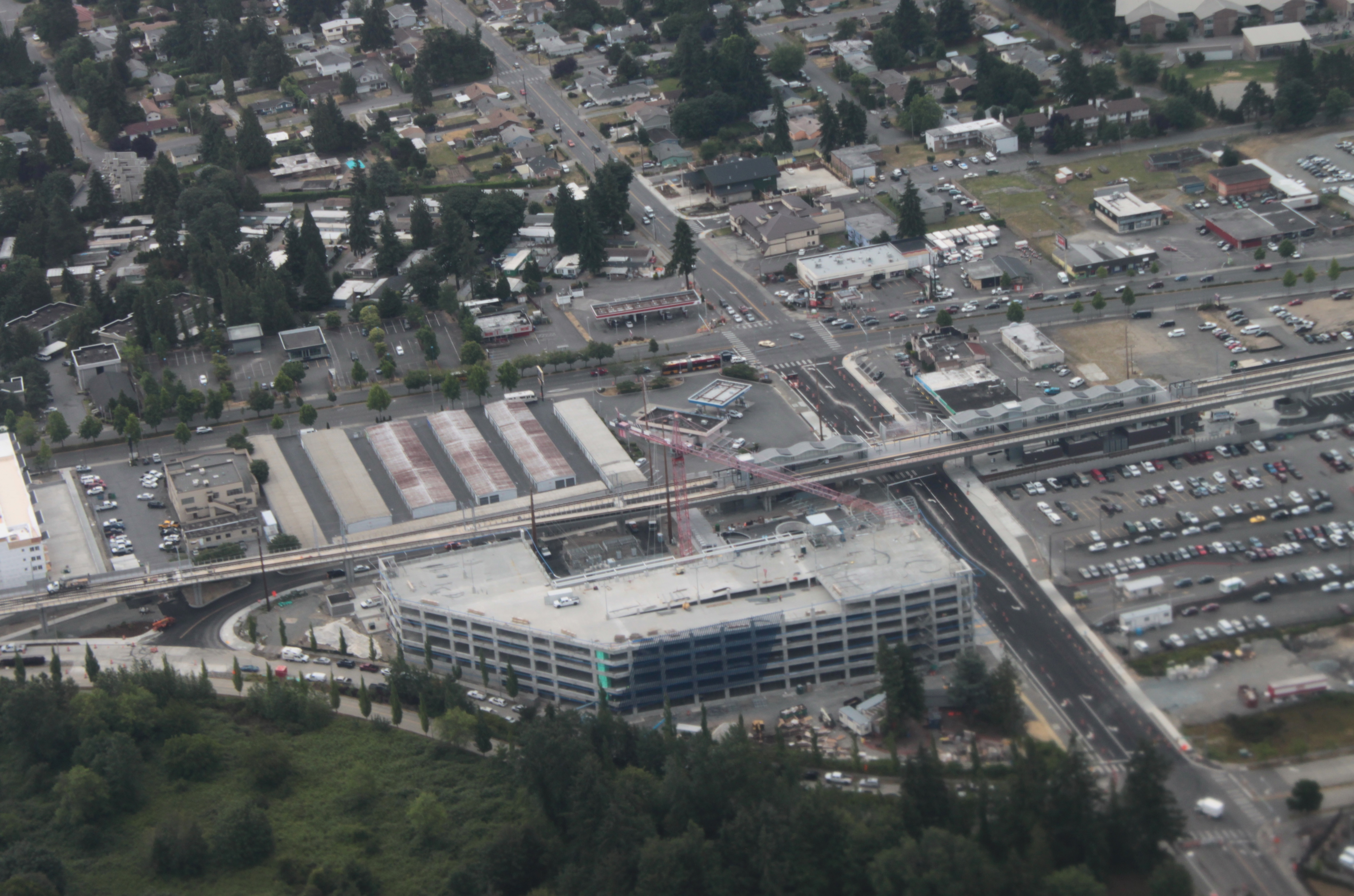
Aerial view of Angle Lake station and its parking garage under construction in June 2016

The earliest proposal for a light rail station near Angle Lake came from the Puget Sound Council of Governments in 1986, as part of a north–south line from Lynnwood to Federal Way. A regional transit authority (RTA) was formed in the early 1990s to study a regional light rail system, first proposing a $6.7 billion plan in 1995 that included a light rail station at Angle Lake as part of a line between Downtown Seattle, Seattle–Tacoma International Airport, and Tacoma. The proposal was rejected by voters in March 1995, and the RTA presented a smaller proposal the following year. The second proposal, called "Sound Move", selected a station at South 200th Street in SeaTac as the southern terminus of a light rail line traveling north through the Rainier Valley to Downtown Seattle and the University of Washington campus; it was approved by voters in November 1996 and was scheduled to open in 2006.

The RTA, later re-branded as Sound Transit, selected an elevated alignment for the station in 1999 and added a park and ride facility. A series of budgeting troubles led to the line being truncated to South 154th Street in Tukwila, 1 mile (1.6 km) north of the airport, in late 2001; the cost of extending the $2.1 billion line to the airport and South 200th Street was estimated to be $350 to $450 million. An extension to the airport was eventually approved in 2006 and opened in December 2009, a few months after the initial line from Seattle to Tukwila.

The South 200th Street station was reorganized as a part of a $1.4 billion, 4.3-mile (6.9 km) light rail extension from Sea-Tac Airport to the Highline College area to open by 2021, which was put on the 2007 Roads and Transit ballot measure. The ballot measure failed, in part because of its reliance on road expansion. A smaller, transit-only ballot measure known as "Sound Transit 2" was approved by voters in November 2008, including a light rail extension to Redondo/Star Lake to open by 2023.

Sound Transit began exploring means to accelerate the construction of the South 200th Street station in 2010, using federal grants to align the opening with the University Link Extension in 2016 and provide additional parking capacity to supplement Tukwila International Boulevard station. In December 2010, amid a tax revenue shortfall during the ongoing economic recession, the Sound Transit Board elected to suspend all design work on the light rail project south of South 200th Street. The Sound Transit Board officially approved an accelerated schedule for the South 200th Street station in July 2011, seeking a federal Transportation Investment Generating Economic Recovery (TIGER) grant of up to $34 million; a $10 million grant was awarded in December, allowing the opening date for the station to move from 2020 to September 2016.

External videos
- Timelapse video of guideway construction, showing the assembly of concrete segments to form bridge spans.

PCL Construction was awarded the $169 million design-build contract for the extension and the station in September 2012. The station was given a new name, "Angle Lake" after a nearby lake, in December as the extension and station were undergoing final design.

Construction on the extension began after a groundbreaking ceremony held on April 26, 2013, using 1,166 crane-lifted hollow concrete segments that are cinched together to make bridge spans on the 1.6-mile (2.6 km) elevated guideway. A $30 million design-built contract was awarded to Harbor Pacific/Graham in February 2014 to design and construct Angle Lake station's 1,050-stall parking garage and plaza. Construction of the station and garage began in September 2014. During construction, several nearby businesses complained of lost revenue from blocked access and vibrations from work causing minor damage; they sought compensation from Sound Transit, but the claims were not awarded because of a potential violation of the state constitution regarding illegal gifting of public funds.

Train testing began in July 2016, and the station opened to the public on September 24, 2016. The opening day celebration was sponsored by Alaska Airlines, whose headquarters are in the area, and had its budget cut back after criticism of the agency's costlier celebrations at the University Link opening in March. Construction of the station and extension was $40 million under the $383 million project budget.

By January 2017, the station was attracting an average of over 2,500 passengers per day, with the garage reaching 93 percent occupancy. Between 2016 and 2017, fourth quarter boardings increased by 25 percent, attributed to riders switching from SeaTac/Airport station. Angle Lake remained as the line's southern terminus until December 6, 2025, when an extension to Federal Way opened.

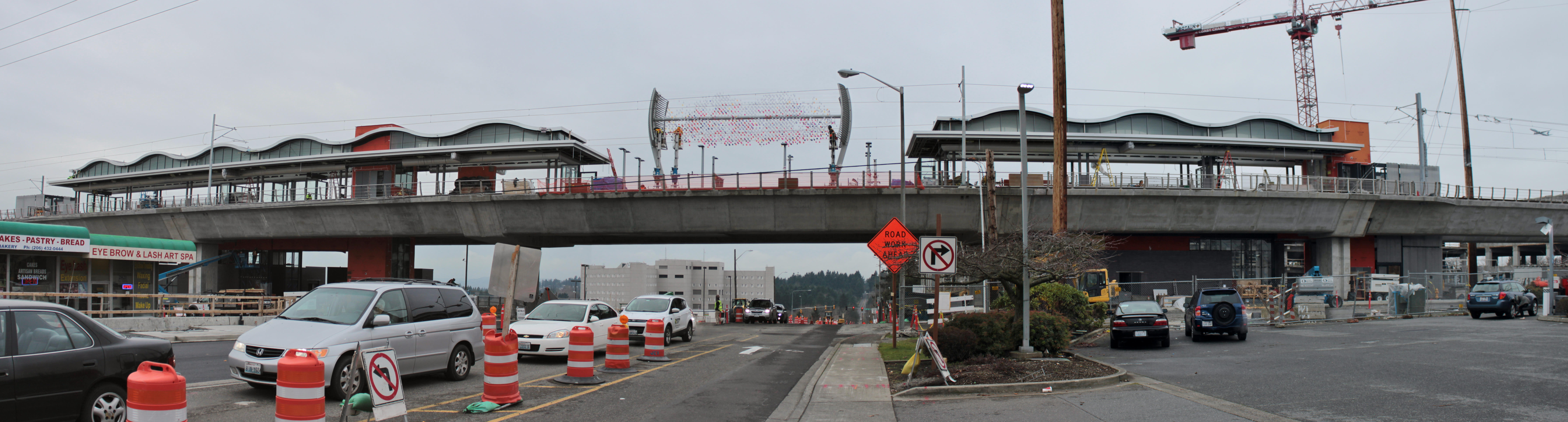
Panoramic view of Angle Lake station under construction in December 2015

== Station layout ==
Angle Lake station consists of a single island platform elevated above street level, on the west side of 28th Avenue South. The station has two entrances located on the north and south sides of South 200th Street, connected to the platform by stairs, escalators and elevators. The station also has secure bicycle storage facilities.

The station has 1,160 total parking spots, primarily contained within a 1,050-stall, seven-story parking garage northwest of the platform that also includes a kiss-and-ride facility. Both are connected to the station via a covered walkway and public plaza. The public plaza between the station and garage was designed by Brooks + Scarpa, after being selected during a design competition. The station also has a 70-stall surface parking lot, storage for 52 bicycles in racks and lease-able lockers, and four charging stations for electric vehicles.

The garage has 2,500 square feet (230 m^{2}) of retail space at ground level, with room to support future transit-oriented development on the west side. The retail space was converted into The Roadhouse, a local music venue, in October 2023 as part of a year-long public art pilot. The garage has three entrances from various streets that connect to different parking levels.

The station was designed by VIA Architecture, with a theme of "Environment in Motion" to be embodied in environmentally-friendly features and artwork. The U.S. Green Building Council awarded Leadership in Energy and Environmental Design (LEED) Gold certification to Sound Transit for the design of Angle Lake station. A 50-kilowatt solar power system is installed on top of the pedestrian walkway and garage, while 60 additional solar panels on the station platform's canopy provide 14 kilowatts of power. The landscaping surrounding the station uses harvested rainwater for irrigation.

=== Art ===
The station's former pictogram, which depicted a rainbow trout

Angle Lake station also houses two art installations as part of the "STart" program, which allocates a percentage of project construction funds to art projects to be used in stations. Laura Haddad's Cloud is the station's most prominent feature and is suspended over the elevated platform as it crosses South 200th Street. The 48-foot-long (15 m), 26-foot-high (7.9 m) sculpture consists of 6,000 small colored acrylic disks that reflect sunlight in ways dependent on variations in light, weather or an approaching train; at night, the disks are illuminated with LED floodlights that fade from orange to blue as trains approach the station. Haddad describes her sculpture as a "community landmark" and "sculptural barometer of local weather". Jill Anholt's Immerse is embedded in the plaza's grand staircase and consists of four "delicate arcs" made of curved steel and tubing that connect the garage and station. Anholt's piece uses the arcs to filter light onto the parking area and "celebrates the process of falling rain".

The station's former pictogram depicted a rainbow trout, the state fish and one that is stocked in Angle Lake. It was created by Christian French as part of the Stellar Connections series and its points represent nearby destinations. The pictogram series was retired in 2024 and replaced by station numbers.

== Services ==
Angle Lake station is served by the 1 Line, which runs between Lynnwood, the University of Washington campus, Downtown Seattle, the Rainier Valley, Seattle–Tacoma International Airport, and Federal Way. It is the twenty-second southbound station from Lynnwood City Center, the northern terminus, and third northbound station from Federal Way Downtown, the southern terminus. Angle Lake is situated between SeaTac/Airport and Kent Des Moines stations. Trains serve the station twenty hours a day on weekdays and Saturdays, from 5:00 am to 1:00 am, and eighteen hours on Sundays, from 6:00 am to 12:00 am; during regular weekday service, trains operate roughly every eight to ten minutes during rush hour and midday operation, respectively, with longer headways of twelve to fifteen minutes in the early morning and at night. During weekends, Link trains arrive at Angle Lake station every ten minutes during midday hours and every twelve to fifteen minutes during mornings and evenings. The station is approximately 73 minutes from Lynnwood City Center station, 41 minutes from Westlake station in Downtown Seattle, and 4 minutes from SeaTac/Airport station. In 2025, an average of 5,000 passengers boarded Link trains at Angle Lake station on weekdays.

King County Metro operates two routes in the vicinity of Angle Lake station. The RapidRide A Line provides frequent bus service on International Boulevard between Federal Way Transit Center and the Tukwila International Boulevard light rail station. The bus stops northbound and southbound at South 200th Street, to the east of the light rail station. Since 2018, the station has also served as the terminus for Route 635, a shuttle bus serving business parks and the downtown area of Des Moines Monday through Saturday.
