= Aline (band) =

French pop rock band (2009–????)

- Also known as: Young Michelin
- Origin: France
- Genres: Pop rock
- Years active: 2009–2011 (as Young Michelin); 2012–???? (as Aline)
- Labels: accelera son / IDOL / PIAS
- Members: Romain Guerret; Arnaud Pilard; Romain Leiris; Vincent Pedretti
- Past members: Laurent Maudoux
- Website: alinemusique.wordpress.com (in French)

Aline is a French pop-rock band that formed in 2009 under the name Young Michelin. The band had to change their name after the tire company Michelin demanded the change.

Originally, the band was made of five musicians based in Marseille: lead singer and rhythm guitarist Romain Guerret, lead guitarist Arnaud Pilard, bass player Romain Leiris, drummer Vincent Pedretti, and keyboard player Laurent Maudoux. When Maudoux left in 2011, he was not replaced, making the band a four-member group.

Prior to Young Michelin, Romain Guerret had another music project named Dondolo and had released two albums: Dondolisme in 2007 and Une vie de plaisir dans un monde nouveau, whose release was postponed to 2010.

By 2009, Guerret had started the Young Michelin project, which had a number of releases and found great reception. In 2009, their first digital single as Young Michelin ("Je suis fatigué" / "Les Copains") earned them the top award at "CQFD: Ceux qu'il faut découvrir" organized by Les Inrockuptibles. They also released a vinyl EP in 2010 consisting of 4 songs ("Je suis fatigué" / "Elle m'oubliera" / "Obscène" / "Teen Whistle") on the La Bulle Sonore label.

In 2011, they released a split EP jointly with Pop at Summer under the title Elle et moi. In 2012, they released another vinyl EP of their own containing 4 songs ("Je bois et puis je danse" / "Hélas" / "Deux hirondelles" / "Je bois et puis je danse (Gambit Mix)"). This latter release was their first as Aline, the ban's new adopted name.

Aline's debut album, Regarde le ciel, was released in January 2013 on IDOL/PIAS France label. The album was produced by Jean-Louis Piérot (ex-member of Les Valentins) and recorded and mixed by Philippe Balzé. Laurent Maudoux did not take part in the album, citing "personal reasons". Although the leaving keyboardist was not permanently replaced, Jérémy Monteiro participated in live shows.

== Discography ==
=== Albums ===
Year	Album	Peak positions	Certifications	Notes
Year	Album	FRA	Certifications	Notes
2013	Regarde le ciel: Released: 7 January 2013; Record label: PIAS France	107		Track list: 1. "Les copains" (4:55); 2. "Je bois et puis je danse" (4:28); 3. "Maudit garçon" (3:09); 4. "Teen Whistle" (3:26); 5. "Deux hirondelles" (2:59); 6. "Il faut partir" (2:35); 7. "Elle et moi" (3:44); 8. "Elle m'oubliera" (3:47); 9. "Voleur!" (3:41); 10. "Obscène" (3:33); 11. "Regarde le ciel" (4:34); 12. "Les copains" (of Anne Laplantine) (2:42)
2015	La Vie Éléctrique: Released 28 August 2015; Record label: [PIAS] Le Label			Track list: 1. "Avenue des armées" 2. "Les résonances cachées" 3. "La vie électrique" 4. "Les angles morts" 5. "Plus noir encore" 6. "Tristesse de la balance" 7. "Chaque jour qui passe" 8. "Une vie" 9. "Les mains vides" 10. "Promis juré craché"

=== EPs and singles ===
as Young Michelin

- 2009: "Je suis fatigué" / "Les Copains" (digital single)
- 2010: "Elle m’oubliera" / "Les Éclaireurs" (digital single)
- 2010: "Je suis fatigué" / "Elle m’oubliera" / "Obscène" / "Teen Whistle" (vinyl EP)
- 2011: "Elle et moi" / "Hélas" (Split EP with Pop at Summer) (vinyl)

as Aline

- 2012: "Je bois et puis je danse" / "Hélas" / "Deux hirondelles" / "Je bois et puis je danse (Gambit Mix)" (vinyl EP and digital downloads)
