= Tukwila International Boulevard station =

Light rail station in Tukwila, Washington

63 Tukwila International Boulevard
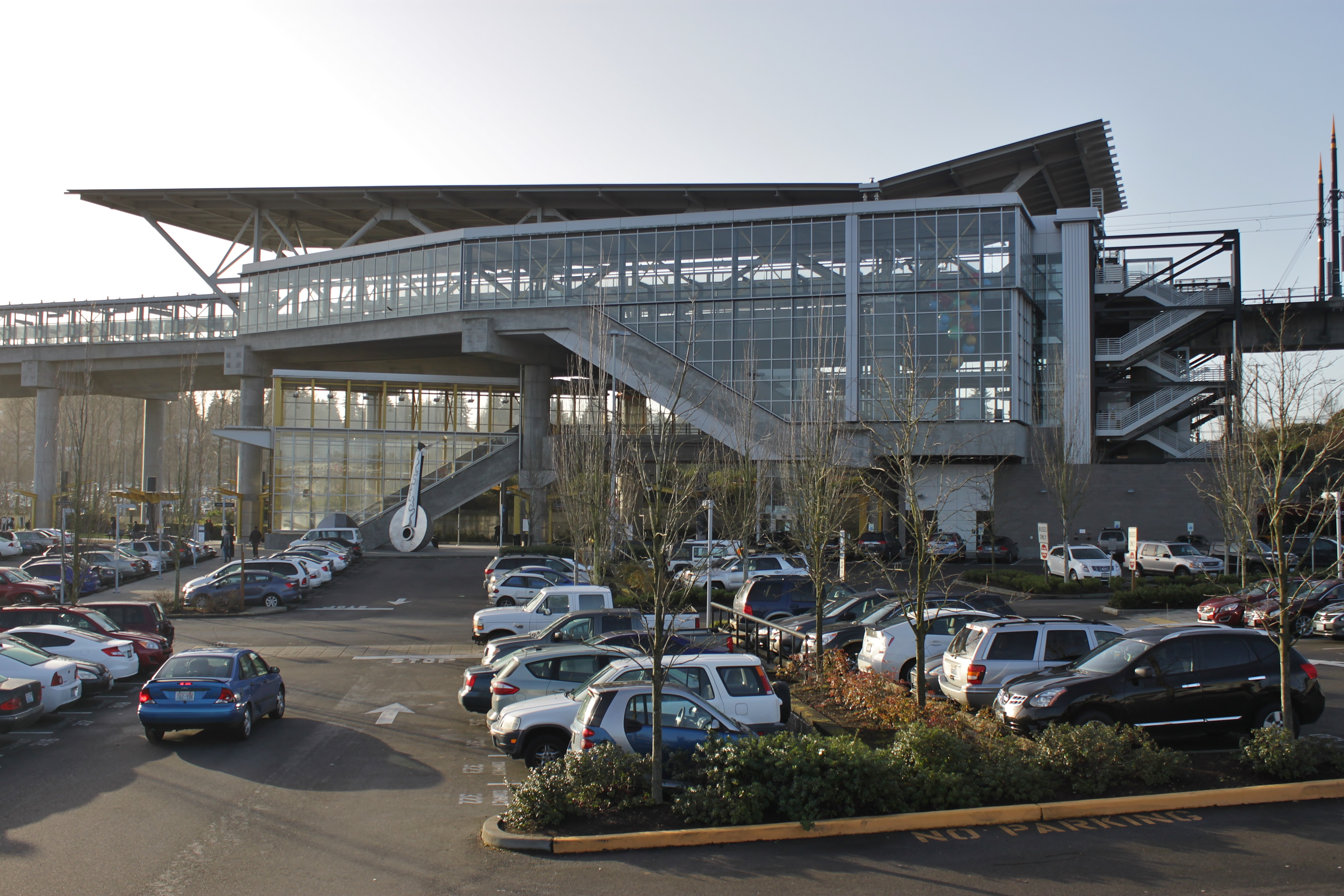
- The station and parking lot, viewed from Southcenter Boulevard in 2016

General information
- Location: 15426 35th Avenue South; Tukwila, Washington; United States
- Coordinates: 47°27′51″N 122°17′17″W
- System: Link light rail
- Owner: Sound Transit
- Platforms: 2 side platforms
- Tracks: 2
- Connections: King County Metro (RapidRide)

Construction
- Structure type: Elevated
- Parking: 600 spaces
- Cycle facilities: Lockers and racks
- Accessible: Yes

History
- Opened: July 18, 2009

Passengers
- 3,880 daily weekday boardings (2025); 1,397,789 total boardings (2025)

Services
Preceding station	Sound Transit	Following station
Link
Rainier Beach toward Lynnwood City Center	1 Line	SeaTac/Airport toward Federal Way Downtown
Location

Tukwila International Boulevard station is a light rail station in Tukwila, Washington, United States. It is located between SeaTac/Airport and Rainier Beach stations on the 1 Line from Seattle–Tacoma International Airport to Downtown Seattle. The station consists of two elevated side platforms enclosed within a structure northeast of the interchange of State Route 99 (International Boulevard) and State Route 518. As one of seven park and rides along the line, it includes 600 parking spaces in two lots.

Tukwila International Boulevard station opened on July 18, 2009, on the first day of Central Link service (now part of the 1 Line). It was the line's terminus until SeaTac/Airport station opened in December 2009. Construction of the station was approved in 1996, but did not begin until 2005 due to routing disputes and planning issues. Trains serve the station twenty hours a day on most days; the headway between trains is eight minutes during peak periods, with less frequent service at other times. Tukwila International Boulevard station is also served by King County Metro buses, including two RapidRide limited-stop bus rapid transit routes, which connects it to Downtown Seattle, West Seattle, and various locations in southern King County.

== Location ==
Tukwila International Boulevard station is located on South 154th Street (Southcenter Boulevard) at the intersection of State Routes 518 and 99 (International Boulevard) in southern Tukwila. The highway junction is approximately two miles (3.2 km) north of Seattle–Tacoma International Airport and serves as its main entrance; it is also adjacent to the airport's consolidated rental car facility and parking lots. The station is one mile (1.6 km) west of the Westfield Southcenter Mall, a major regional shopping center, and is connected to it via the RapidRide F Line. To the north of the station area is Tukwila's commercial district, which includes businesses that specialize in goods and cuisine that draw from the city's ethnically-diverse population.

The Tukwila International Boulevard station area consists primarily of single-family homes, with some multi-family residential and commercial buildings along International Boulevard and Southcenter Boulevard. In 2013, the Puget Sound Regional Council (PSRC) counted a population of 4,155 residents in 2,332 housing units within a half-mile (0.8 km) radius of the station, of which 95 percent were considered affordable. The King County Housing Authority purchased 286 apartments in a building near Tukwila International Boulevard station in 2015 to preserve their affordable rates for low-income households. The PSRC describes the area as one dominated by auto-oriented development leading to "poor pedestrian and bicycle infrastructure that impedes walkability".

The area surrounding the station is split between the cities of SeaTac and Tukwila by International Boulevard, leading to two comprehensive plans for transit-oriented development near the station. SeaTac adopted a redevelopment proposal in 2006 for 42 acres (17 hectares) of land west of International Boulevard, with the goal of bringing an additional 2,600 people daily to the area by 2020 via mixed-use development. The city of Tukwila adopted an urban renewal plan in 1998 and an updated comprehensive plan in 2015, both recommending improved commercial access and additional residential units around the station and on International Boulevard. A Spokane-based developer plans to build 665 housing units on a site northwest of the station, including 385 affordable housing units; the development plan, however, displaces a number of immigrant-owned businesses at the SeaTac Market.

== History ==
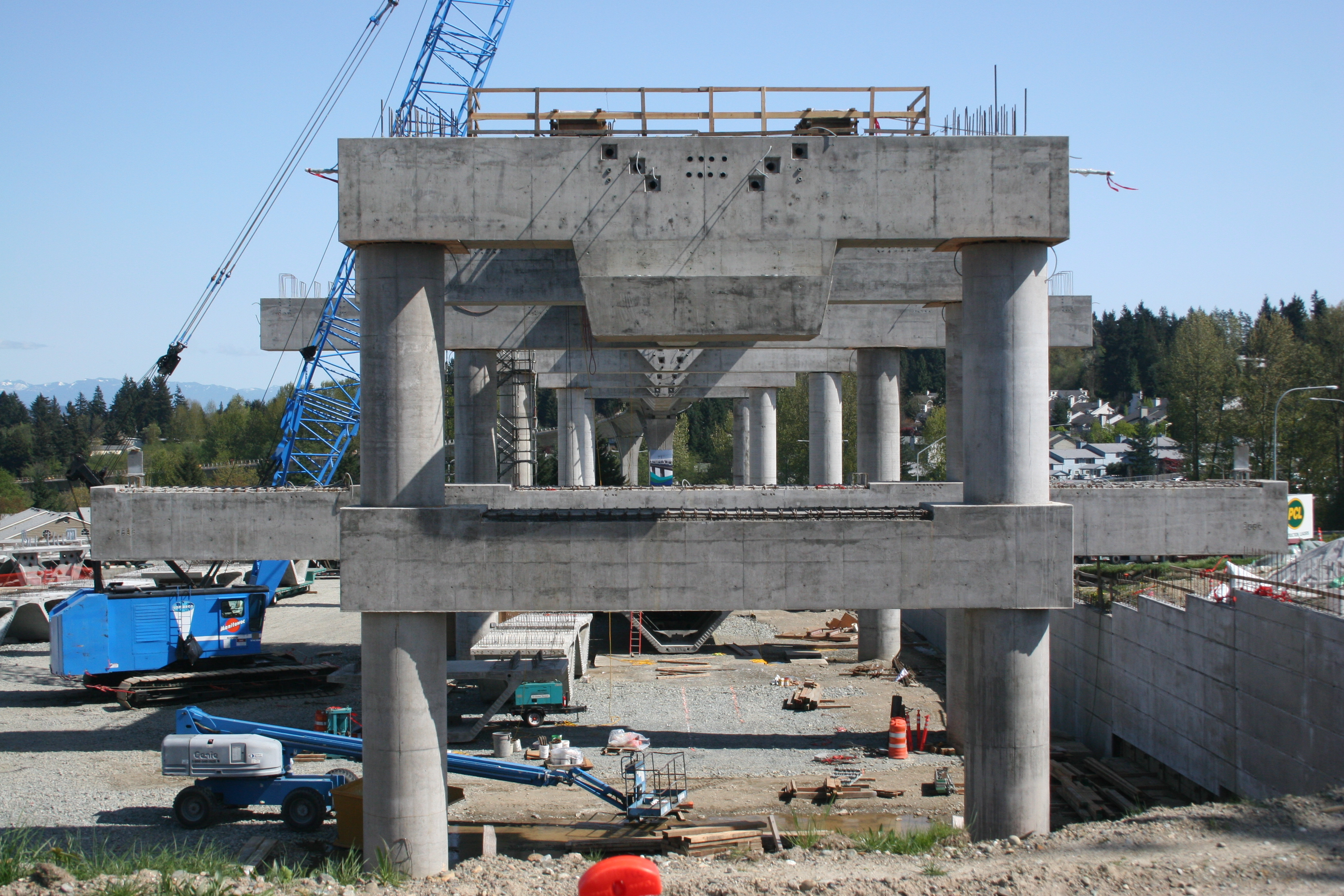
The station under construction in April 2006

The earliest proposal for a light rail station near Tukwila came from the Puget Sound Council of Governments in 1986, as part of a north–south line from Lynnwood to Federal Way. The station would have been on State Route 518 northwest of the Southcenter Mall, between stations at Seattle–Tacoma International Airport and on Interurban Avenue. A regional transit authority (RTA) was formed in the early 1990s to study a regional light rail system, presenting a $6.7 billion plan on the March 1995 ballot. The plan included an at-grade light rail line on Pacific Highway (State Route 99; later International Boulevard), with stops at South 144th and 158th streets in Tukwila. The proposal was opposed by the Tukwila City Council and rejected by voters, and as a result, the RTA placed a smaller proposal on the following year's ballot. The second proposal, called "Sound Move", selected a station near South 158th Street in Tukwila and was approved by voters in November 1996.

The RTA, by then renamed to Sound Transit, began a series of public hearings in late 1997 to determine the routing of the line. Tukwila leaders preferred a route serving the Southcenter Mall that would add six to seven minutes of travel time and $150 million in project costs. The Sound Transit Board chose an at-grade line on International Boulevard as their preferred routing in February 1999, which the city argued would interfere with their near-term plans to revamp the street. The board's preferred route, selected in November 1999, included an at-grade line on International Boulevard through Tukwila and an elevated station at South 154th Street with a park and ride facility.

Several weeks before the November 1999 decision, Tukwila proposed an alternate alignment using State Route 599, Interstate 5, and State Route 518. The proposal, known as the "Tukwila Freeway Route", removed light rail from International Boulevard and served a station at South 154th Street, but was criticized by business owners for not serving the city's urban center at Southcenter Mall. The proposal was too late to be examined in the initial environmental impact statement in November 1999, but a formal environmental review of the suggested route was initiated in May 2000, and on February 8, 2001, it was adopted by the Sound Transit Board as the preferred route for the Central Link light rail project (now part of the 1 Line). Budgetary problems with the project led to the shortening of the line in late 2001, terminating at the South 154th Street park and ride instead of Seattle–Tacoma International Airport.

In June 2002, the Tukwila City Council rejected a memorandum of agreement with Sound Transit that would have expedited processing of light rail permits issued by the city. Although the city council supported the Tukwila Freeway Route in 2001, the lack of service to Southcenter drove the rejection despite lobbying from elected officials in other cities. Despite fears that Tukwila's decision would jeopardize federal funding for the project, Sound Transit was granted its application for a $500 million commitment from the Federal Transit Administration (FTA) later that month. The city council approved expedited permitting in 2004 after requesting Sound Transit increase the parking capacity at the future South 154th Street station and park and ride to 600 stalls, at an additional cost of $5 million.

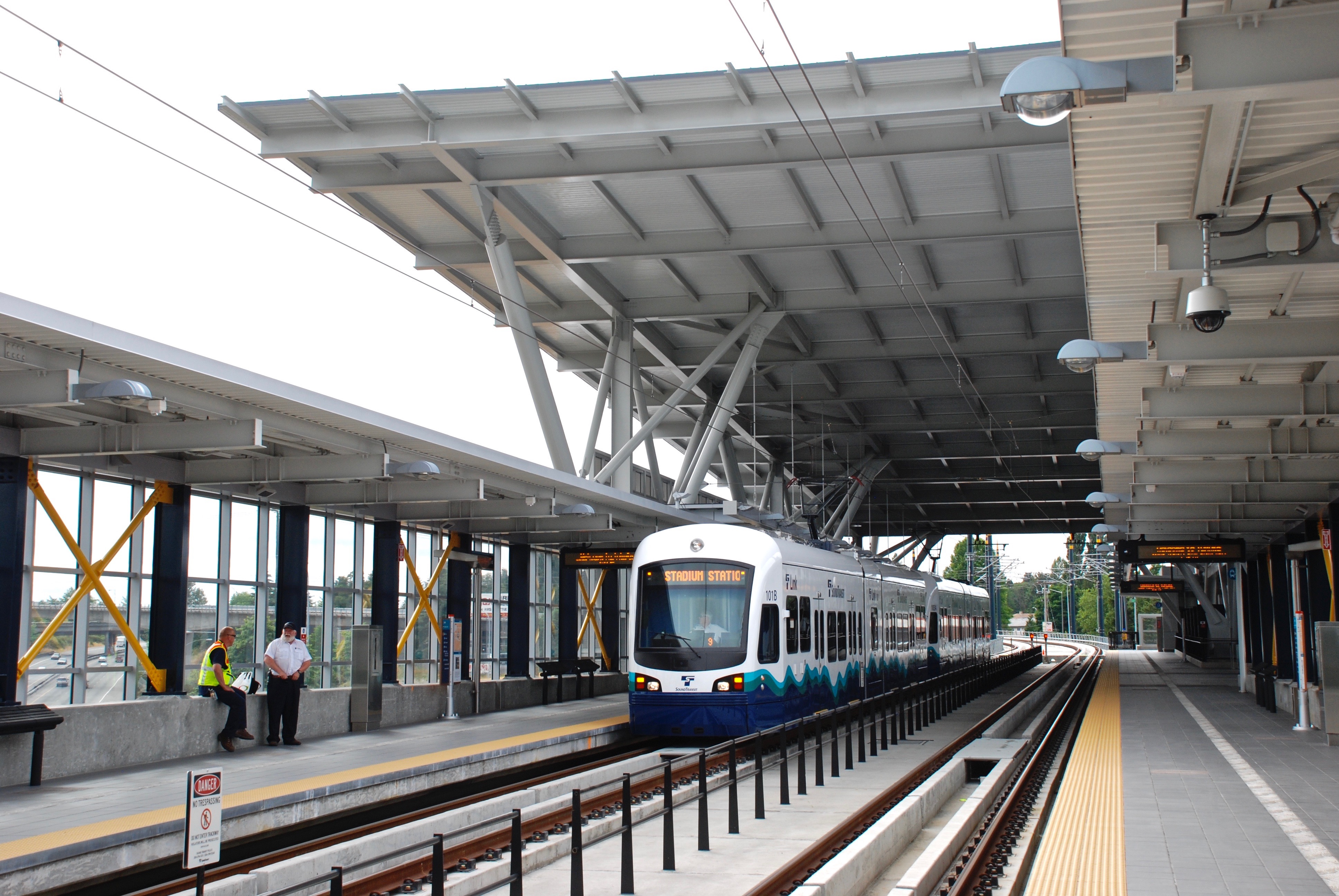
Platform view of the station, with an arriving northbound train

The station was officially named Tukwila International Boulevard in January 2005, and in March PCL was awarded the $231.7 million contract for building the station and 4.22 miles (6.79 km) of elevated guideway between Tukwila and Rainier Beach station. Site clearing at the future station, which was previously an airport parking lot operated by Ajax, began the following month. By late November, the first elevated guideway segment was completed and column erection at the station was near completion. The mezzanine and the main structural elements of the station were completed between late 2005 and early 2007. The station and segment through Tukwila were declared substantially complete by PCL Construction in March 2008 and all major work at the station was finished by late June.

The station and its 600-space park and ride opened on July 18, 2009, the first day of Central Link service, and served as the line's interim southern terminus. The following week, a shuttle bus service to Seattle–Tacoma International Airport began operating from the station every ten to fifteen minutes to the airport's main terminal. The shuttle service was discontinued when SeaTac/Airport station opened on December 19, 2009, replacing Tukwila as the new southern terminus of the line. The station's bus loop was repaved in 2019 at a cost of $1.35 million after extensive damage to the asphalt was found.

== Station layout ==
The station consists of two side platforms, elevated 51 feet (16 m) above ground level, and a mezzanine with ticket vending machines and rider information. The two levels are connected to each other and street level by a series of escalators, stairs, and elevators. Designed by David Hewitt and his Seattle-based architecture firm, the station includes elements meant to evoke "airplanes and liftoff", including an angular roof shaped like the wings of an airplane. At platform level, the station features large glass windows with views of Tukwila, Mount Baker, and the Sea-Tac airport control tower. Below the platform and mezzanine levels is a bus station and passenger drop-off area.

The station also includes a 600-stall park and ride lot next to the bus station and an auxiliary lot located across Southcenter Boulevard. The park and ride, initially the only facility on Central Link, would regularly fill before 9:00 a.m. by 2013, leading to complaints and commuters parking on nearby residential streets. An additional 62 parking spaces were added in November 2013, through a lease from a private garage owned by the City of SeaTac. The overflow lot was later closed in March 2020. The opening of the University Link Extension in 2016 worsened the parking issue, leaving the lot filled by 6:40 a.m. Sound Transit began a permit parking trial in September 2016 that reserves spaces for registered carpool vehicles for a monthly fee of $5, in an effort to alleviate the parking problems at the station. A second park and ride opened at Angle Lake station in September 2016, which was expected to relieve the Tukwila lot, but demand remained the same while Angle Lake's lot filled with new commuters. Sound Transit also offers a bicycle parking station with eight secured spots, as well as racks for temporary use.

=== Art ===
The station was formerly represented on maps and signage by a pictogram of a canoe, inspired by the city's history as a transportation hub at the intersection of three rivers. It was created by Christian French as part of the Stellar Connections series. Its points represented nearby destinations, including Tukwila City Hall, Fort Dent Park, Foster High School, and several community parks. The pictogram series was retired and replaced by station numbers in August 2024.

The station houses four art installations: three works by sculptor Tad Savinar, and one by Clark Wiegman. They were funded by the "STart" program, which allocates a percentage of project construction funds to art projects to be used in stations. Savinar's A Drop of Sustenance, suspended above the escalators to the northbound platform, features a large raindrop that represents the "living water" used for sustenance by the region's plants and animals; The Seattle Times called it a witty, "regionally apt pop-art image". Savinar also created A Molecule of the Region on the southbound entry, featuring memories and sayings about Tukwila from residents arranged in a ball-and-stick molecular model, and Voices of Tukwila, with more quotes from residents etched into tiles on the platform.

At ground level is Soundings by Wiegman, an abstract representation of two halves of a hazelnut. One of the halves includes a handle etched with the path of the Duwamish River through Tukwila, carved in an illuminated, blue ribbon. The piece, which also features ambient noise, was inspired by the Chinook Jargon name for Tukwila, k'ap'uxac (translated to "place of hazelnuts").

== Services ==
Tukwila International Boulevard station is part of Sound Transit's 1 Line, which runs from between Lynnwood, the University of Washington campus, Downtown Seattle, the Rainier Valley, Seattle–Tacoma International Airport, and Federal Way. It is the twentieth southbound station from Lynnwood City Center and fifth northbound station from Federal Way Downtown; Tukwila International Boulevard is situated between Rainier Beach and SeaTac/Airport stations. Trains serve the station twenty hours a day on weekdays and Saturdays, from 5:00 am to 1:00 am, and eighteen hours on Sundays, from 6:00 am to 12:00 am; during regular weekday service, trains operate roughly every eight to ten minutes during rush hour and midday operation, respectively, with longer headways of twelve to fifteen minutes in the early morning and at night. During weekends, Link trains arrive at Tukwila International Boulevard station every ten minutes during midday hours and every twelve to fifteen minutes during mornings and evenings. The station is approximately 66 minutes from Lynnwood City Center station, 34 minutes from Westlake station in Downtown Seattle, and 3 minutes from SeaTac/Airport station. In 2025, an average of 3,880 passengers boarded Link trains at Tukwila International Boulevard station on weekdays.

The station is also served by several King County Metro bus routes that use a plaza-level bus station under the Link platforms. The three-bay station opened on September 19, 2009, and includes a public restroom and real-time arrival screens. The RapidRide A Line terminates at the station and travels south along State Route 99 through SeaTac, the Highline College area and the city of Federal Way, ending at Federal Way Transit Center. The RapidRide F Line passes through the station on its route between Burien, Southcenter Mall, the Tukwila commuter rail station, and Renton. Local routes connect Tukwila International Boulevard station to Georgetown, SoDo, Downtown Seattle, West Seattle, White Center, and Southcenter. Sound Transit operates a night bus from Lakewood to Downtown Seattle with an intermediate stop in Tukwila during hours without Link service.

Sound Transit's Stride S1 Line, a bus rapid transit route, is planned to serve Tukwila International Boulevard station through a set of freeway bus stops in the median of SR 518. The Stride stops are estimated to cost up to $130 million and also include a pedestrian bridge to the south side of the freeway, elevators, and a fish passage to replace an existing culvert. The S1 Line is scheduled to open in 2028 and connect the station to Burien, Renton, and Bellevue Transit Center via Interstate 405.
