= Federal Way Downtown station =

Light rail and bus station

68 Federal Way Downtown
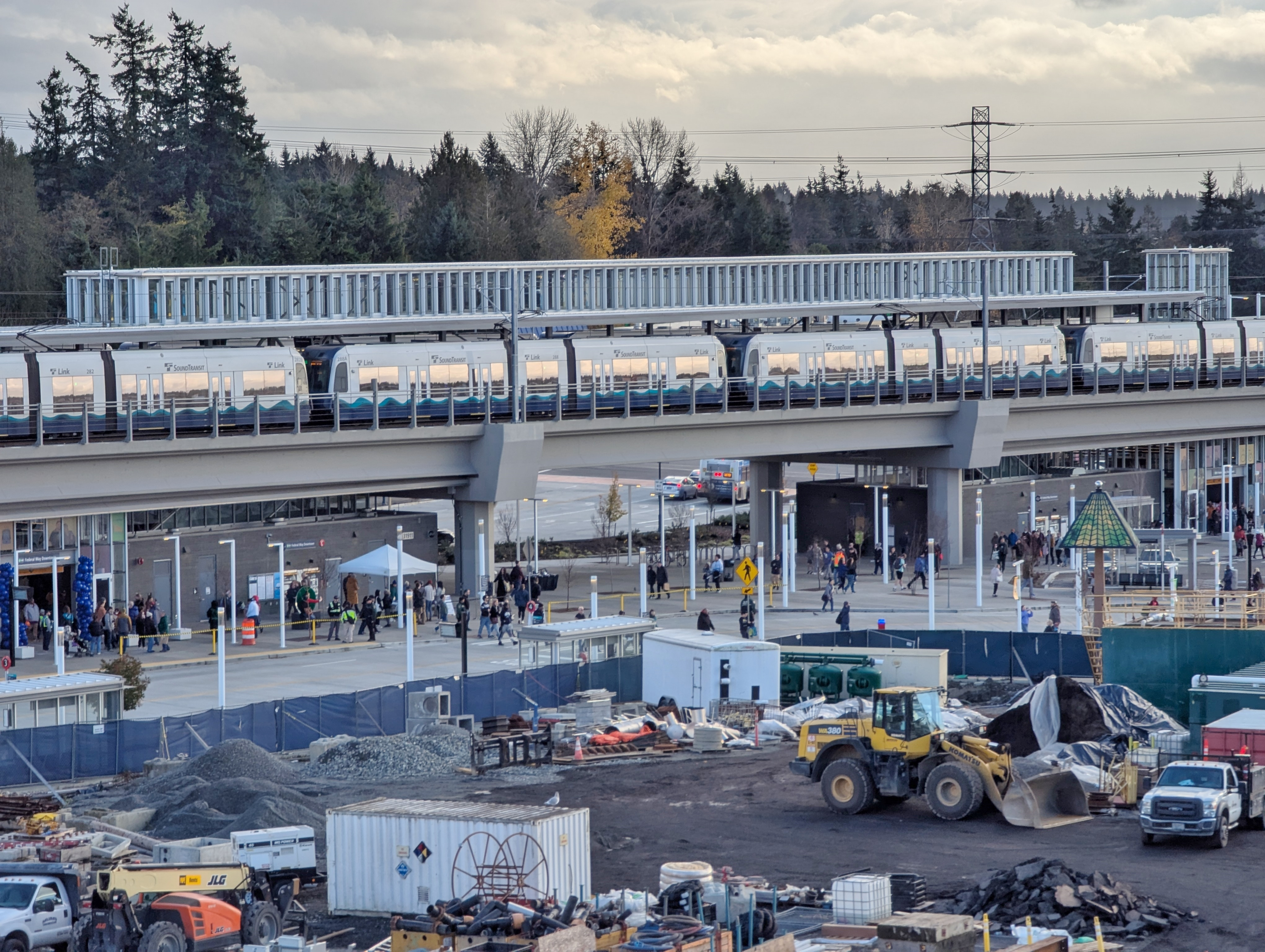
- Light rail platform on opening day

General information
- Location: 31621 23rd Avenue South; Federal Way, Washington; United States
- Coordinates: 47°18′57″N 122°18′14″W
- Platforms: 1 island platform
- Tracks: 2
- Train operators: Sound Transit
- Bus routes: 16
- Bus stands: 13
- Bus operators: King County Metro; Pierce Transit; Sound Transit Express

Construction
- Structure type: Elevated
- Parking: 1,524 spaces
- Cycle facilities: Bicycle lockers and racks
- Accessible: Yes

History
- Opened: February 11, 2006 (transit center); December 6, 2025 (light rail)
- Rebuilt: 2020–2025
- Former names: Federal Way Transit Center

Services
| Preceding station | Sound Transit | Following station |
Link
| Star Lake toward Lynnwood City Center | 1 Line | Terminus |
Proposed service
| Star Lake toward Lynnwood City Center | 1 Line Tacoma Dome Extension (2032) | South Federal Way toward Tacoma Dome |
Location

Federal Way Downtown station is a light rail and bus station in Federal Way, Washington, United States. It is the southern terminus of the 1 Line, part of the Link light rail system managed by Sound Transit, and is also served by King County Metro, Pierce Transit, and Sound Transit Express buses. The station is located near The Commons at Federal Way shopping mall and has a 1,500-stall parking garage. It is also the terminus of the RapidRide A Line, a bus route operated by King County Metro.

The first park-and-ride lot in Federal Way was opened by Metro Transit (now King County Metro) in 1979 and was primarily served by express buses to Downtown Seattle. Plans for a new facility, named Federal Way Transit Center, were approved by voters in 1996 with the establishment of Sound Transit as a regional transit system. It opened on February 11, 2006, along with an adjacent parking garage and a new direct access ramp from Interstate 5. The transit center was sited in Federal Way's desired location for a new downtown with the goal of building transit-oriented development.

Plans to build a light rail station in Federal Way emerged in the 1980s and were approved for preliminary design and engineering by Sound Transit through a 2008 ballot measure. The scope of the project, later named the Federal Way Link Extension, was scaled back due to funding cuts during the Great Recession and later moved to the new Sound Transit 3 package, which was approved in 2016 and funded construction. Federal Way Downtown station began construction in 2020 at a site south of the transit center and garage. The bus bays were moved in March 2025 and the light rail station opened on December 6, 2025.

== Location ==
Federal Way Downtown station is located on the west side of 23rd Avenue South between 317th and 320th streets in Federal Way. To the west is a bus loop that connects with nearby streets and a large roundabout at the north end with direct access to high-occupancy vehicle lanes on Interstate 5. A large parking garage is located on the north side of South 317th Street. The station is north of the Commons at Federal Way, a regional shopping mall, and is surrounded primarily by commercial and retail uses. A pedestrian and bicycle crossing at 21st Avenue South over South 320th Street is planned to connect the station and the Commons at Federal Way after the eight-lane road is rebuilt as a trench.

The Federal Way city government plans to encourage redevelopment of the nearby area to accommodate transit-oriented uses and an estimated 5,000 housing units in long-term forecasts. An urban park named Town Square Park and a performing arts center were opened by the city in 2016 and 2017, respectively, to prepare the area for new development. A former Target big-box store north of the station's parking garage was acquired by the city government and demolished in 2023 to make way for a four-building mixed-use development. The 6-acre (2.4 ha) construction staging area for Federal Way Downtown station was divided into four city blocks and are planned to be used for low-income housing and other development by Sound Transit. A previous proposal to build a 45-story high-rise condominium and hotel tower in the area, to be funded by an EB-5 visa program, was announced in 2010.

== History ==
=== Predecessors ===
The first Metro Transit (now King County Metro) bus routes in the Federal Way area began service in 1973 after the agency was created. The community had local service to Tacoma and Seattle–Tacoma International Airport and later an express route to Downtown Seattle that began in 1976. Federal Way was named as one of several locations in southern King County where Metro would prioritize the construction of a park-and-ride lot in their initial expansion plans. In 1974, a local businessman donated 5.6 acres (2.3 ha) of land east of the SeaTac Mall to construct a park-and-ride lot near South 320th Street. It opened on November 5, 1979, with 798 stalls and direct access to Interstate 5 and South 324th Street for buses.

The park-and-ride also served as a transfer point between Metro Transit and Pierce Transit, which began operating buses from Tacoma to Federal Way in July 1980. The Tacoma trips were timed to connect with Metro's express buses during rush hour and the local route on State Route 99 at other times. Tacoma Transit had previously operated service into Federal Way to connect Tacoma with Metro Transit until a private operator took over the route in 1975. By 1988, the Federal Way–Seattle route had the most daily passengers of Metro's 60 express routes and the expanded, 947-stall parking lot was regularly full on weekdays. Metro later reorganized its service in southern King County in 1997 to focus on local hubs like Federal Way's park-and-ride to replace transfers in Downtown Seattle.

=== Transit center ===
Funding for a regional transit agency, later named Sound Transit, was approved by a 1996 ballot measure that included the construction of new transit facilities and rail systems. The ballot measure included $40 million allocated toward a new transit center in Federal Way that would include a parking garage and a direct access ramp to the high-occupancy vehicle lanes on Interstate 5. A regional bus system, Sound Transit Express, was launched in September 1999 and would use the existing park-and-ride in the interim while planning for the new transit center continued. Among the first nine routes were a Federal Way—Bellevue service along with an all-day connection from Lakewood to Seattle–Tacoma International Airport with intermediate stops in Tacoma and Federal Way. The Washington state and King County governments initially supported building the transit center at the existing park-and-ride site, while the Federal Way city government favored a new location away from Interstate 5 that would be able to support future transit-oriented development.

In January 1999, Sound Transit and the city government agreed to develop the transit center away from the existing park-and-ride lot and narrowed its list of candidates to four sites. A preferred location to the north of SeaTac Mall was chosen in March 1999; it was a former Silo electronics store that had been acquired by a sex shop chain that had been opposed by the city government. Planners had envisioned co-locating the transit center's parking garage with a new condominium complex or other retail from private developers, but Sound Transit determined that it would not be feasible without public investment. The transit center project was allocated a $30.6 million budget in October 2000 after several cost-cutting measures were approved, along with modifications to other projects in the Federal Way area. An environmental impact statement for the project was published in March 2002, but a group of local business owners filed an appeal to halt further planning on grounds that the transit center would allegedly worsen traffic congestion. The appeal was dismissed by a hearing examiner in August and followed by a lawsuit from the business owners that was itself declined to be heard by a judge.

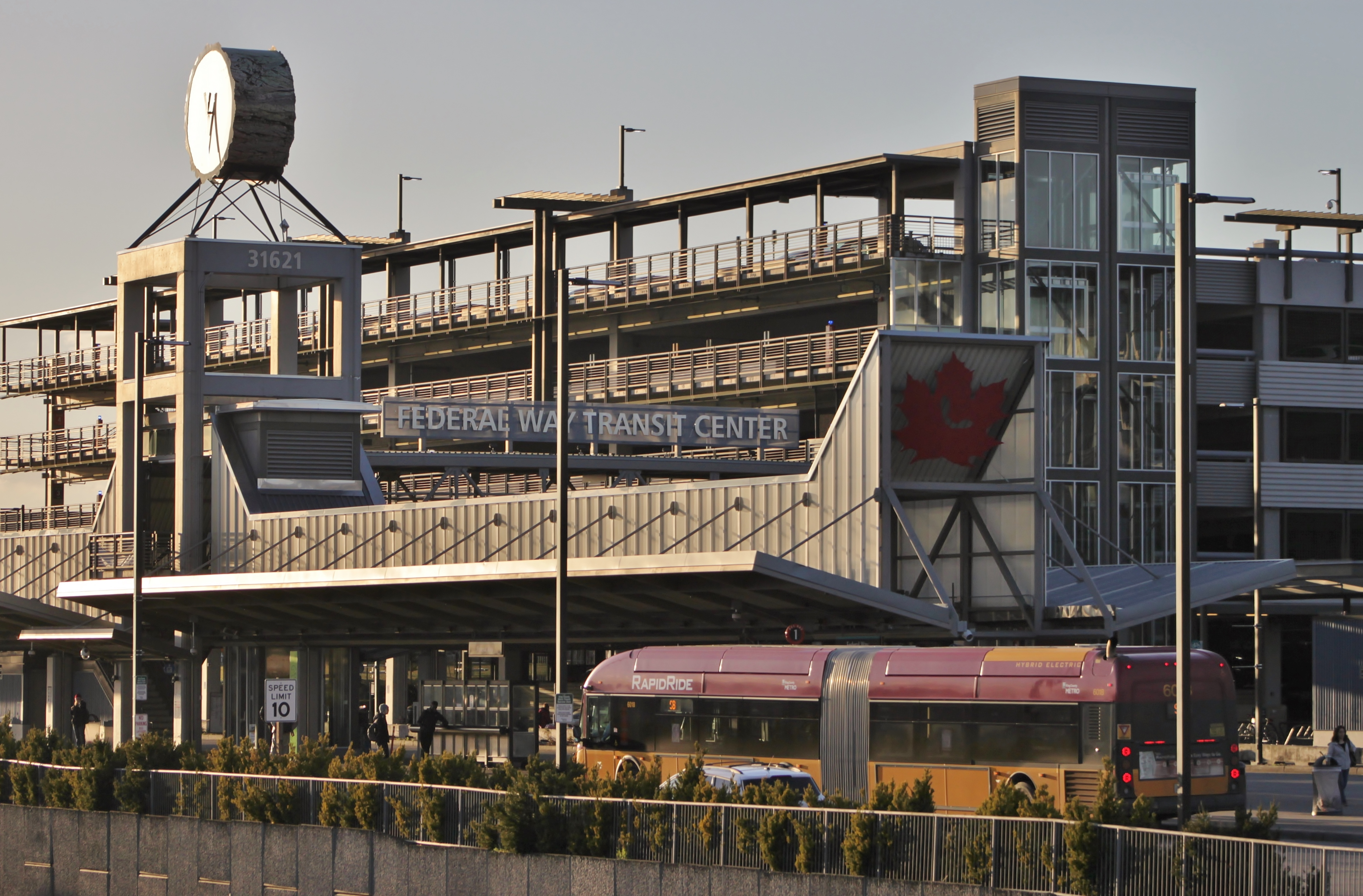
The former transit center, pictured in 2017

Land acquisition for the transit center began in January 2003 with the purchase of three properties by Sound Transit, including the former Silo store; two other properties went through condemnation proceedings. Demolition of the properties at the site began in July 2004 along with work on the direct access ramp, which would be managed by the Washington State Department of Transportation. The new Federal Way Transit Center opened on February 11, 2006, with twelve bus bays on an island platform covered by a 400-foot (120 m) canopy. It was designed to serve 200 daily buses on routes operated by King County Metro, Pierce Transit, and Sound Transit Express. The first half of the direct access ramp on South 317th Street opened on February 10, while Sound Transit launched a new express route to Downtown Seattle on February 13. The 6.9-acre (2.8 ha) transit center included a five-story parking garage with 1,200 stalls that was connected to the bus bays by a pedestrian bridge, a set of public restrooms, and a kiss and ride zone. A large clock, shaped like a cut tree log, was installed over the pedestrian bridge as part of Sound Transit's public art program; a second clock that resembles a maple leaf was installed over the bus bays.

The first transit-oriented development project undertaken by Sound Transit opened in June 2010 at the transit center using a parcel adjacent to the parking garage. The Korean Women's Association developed a 61-unit low-income housing complex with offices for their organization at a cost of $18 million. In October 2010, King County Metro launched its first RapidRide bus rapid transit route—named the A Line—with service on State Route 99 from Federal Way Transit Center to Tukwila International Boulevard station. A February 2015 survey of vehicles parked at the transit center found that 75 percent were registered to addresses within 5 miles (8.0 km) of the facility. The park-and-ride had seen several years of near-capacity use on weekdays, reaching a peak of 100 percent in 2011. Ridership on routes from the transit center reached 4,655 daily boardings in 2015, with Sound Transit's peak-only express route to Downtown Seattle drawing the most passengers during the morning hours. By 2024, there were 7,000 daily boardings at Federal Way Transit Center.

=== Light rail plans ===
In 1984, Metro Transit and the Puget Sound Council of Governments formed a joint committee to study routes for a regional light rail system that would serve the Seattle metropolitan area; Federal Way was among the areas considered for a future station beyond the first phase of the plan, which would reach as far south as either Seattle–Tacoma International Airport or Renton. The committee's final report in 1986 selected Federal Way as the terminus of the 88-mile (142 km) system, which would primarily follow Interstate 5 through Seattle to Lynnwood and branch to the east on Interstate 90. Another regional transit study in 1994 proposed a Federal Way–Tacoma light rail line, as well as a connection to the Eastside, to supplement the main Federal Way–Seattle corridor. The Regional Transit Authority (now Sound Transit) selected a full Seattle–Tacoma route with an intermediate station in downtown Federal Way to be included in its ballot measure, which was rejected by voters in March 1995. The revised Sound Move plan was passed in November 1996 but truncated the light rail system at Seattle–Tacoma International Airport.

As the initial Link light rail system was constructed in the early 2000s, Sound Transit began studying future extensions that would be included in a second major funding package. A southern extension from the airport to Federal Way and Tacoma along State Route 99 was listed among 80 candidate projects in 2005 and advanced for further study with a preliminary plan to serve the transit center. The corridor was part of the 50-mile (80 km) light rail expansion in the 2007 Roads and Transit ballot measure, which was rejected by voters. A standalone transit ballot measure, named Sound Transit 2, passed in November 2008 with a 34-mile (55 km) light rail expansion that would terminate at a South 272nd Street station when completed in 2023. The plan financed preliminary engineering and right of way acquisition for the remaining section to downtown Federal Way, which would need to be funded at a later date. To offset a large decline in projected tax revenue for Sound Transit during the Great Recession, several projects were modified and truncated. The South 272nd Street station was deferred in 2011 and would only receive funding for planning and engineering.

In July 2015, Sound Transit selected its preferred alignment along Interstate 5 for the Federal Way Link Extension, which would include the funded portion between Angle Lake station and Highline College as well as the deferred section that reaches downtown Federal Way. An elevated station adjacent to the existing transit center was part of the alignment but an additional north–south siting option was to be studied in the final environmental impact statement. Sound Transit also studied station locations that were to the west of the transit center to serve State Route 99, a retained cut option east of the transit center on South 317th Street, and a retained cut station at the South 320th Street park-and-ride lot. The deferred portion of the Federal Way Link Extension, originally estimated to cost $1.6 billion, was funded by voter approval of the Sound Transit 3 ballot measure in November 2016. The program also included funding to extend Link light rail service further south from Federal Way to Tacoma by 2030.

The final design–build contract for the stations and 7.8 miles (12.6 km) in guideways on the entire extension was awarded to the Kiewit Corporation in June 2019. During the final design process, Sound Transit approved a motion to move the bus bays to the west side of the station for improved transfers to Link trains; the existing transit center bus bays would be demolished to reduce maintenance costs. A second parking garage with 400 stalls was originally planned to be built for the station, but was dropped from plans during final design in favor of expanding the existing garage. Federal Way Downtown station was adopted as the official name of the station by Sound Transit in June 2022; it had been favored in public feedback over Downtown Federal Way station, while the city council had supported retaining the name Federal Way Transit Center.

=== Light rail construction ===
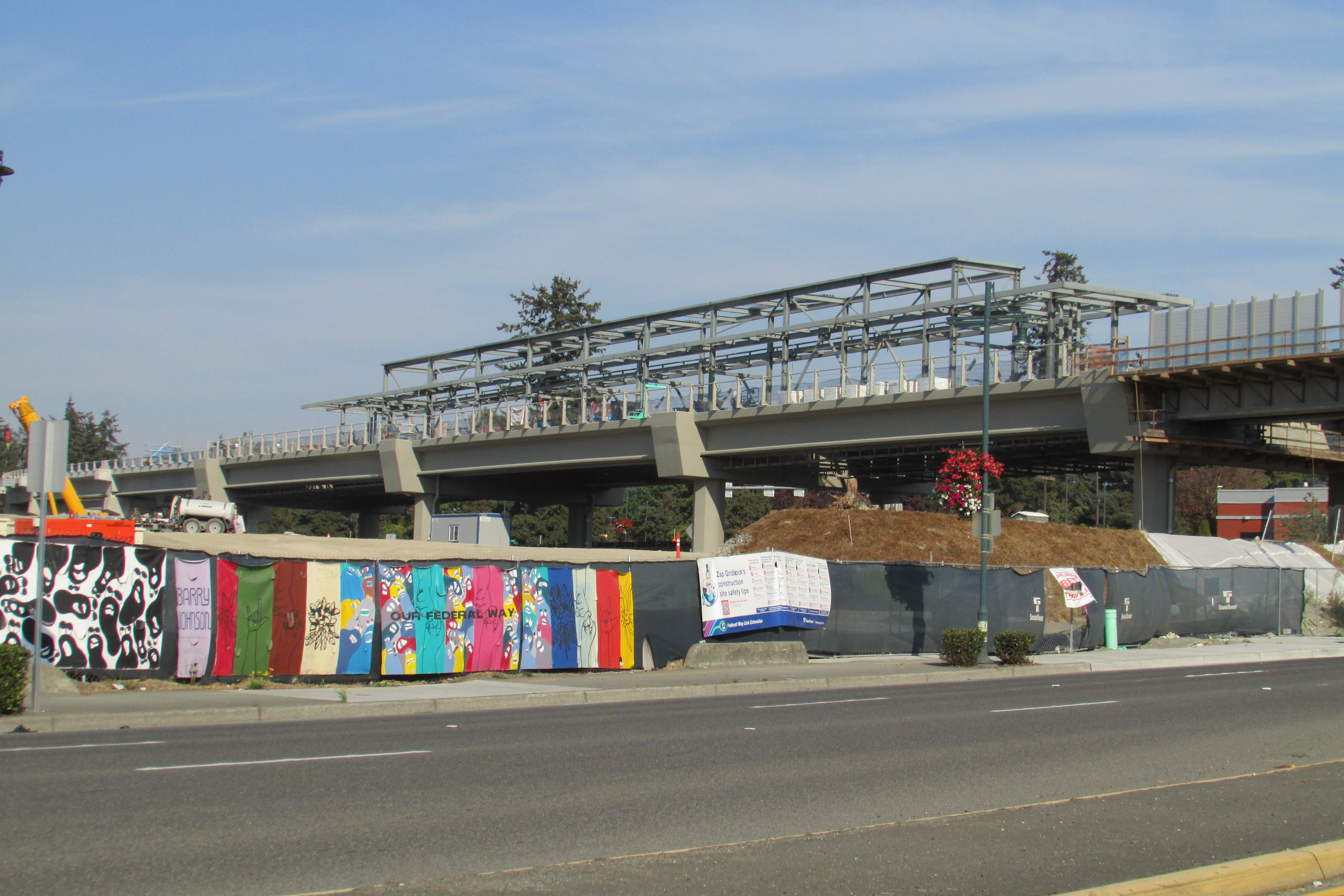
Platform construction in October 2022

The property acquisition process for the station and its staging area began with letters to affected property owners in April 2017. Demolition of the site's buildings—a vacated strip mall, two restaurants, and a gas station—began in April 2020 to prepare for station construction. The groundbreaking ceremony for the Federal Way Link Extension was held virtually through an online video released in July 2020 due to restrictions on public gatherings during the COVID-19 pandemic. A series of 42 murals from artists in the local Pacific Islander, Black, and Asian communities were planned to be installed on the construction fencing that surrounds the station site. Several pieces were damaged through an act of vandalism in August 2020 that Sound Transit officials characterized as "suspected to have been motivated by racism".

Excavation and drilling for the station's elevated guideway began in March 2021 and was followed three months later by the start of column construction. The girders for the station's elevated platform were installed between August and December 2021; they were followed by girders over South 320th Street for the future tail tracks in July 2022. The first section of the steel canopy supporting the station roof was erected in September 2022. Construction of Federal Way Downtown station reached the 50 percent milestone in July 2023 alongside completion of the structural steel and concrete pouring at the platform level.

The new bus loop directly under the light rail platforms opened on March 30, 2025. The old transit center was then closed for demolition. Testing of light rail trains at Federal Way Downtown station began in early 2025 and was followed by substantial completion of the construction contract in August 2025. The existing parking garage at the transit center was expanded to the west to add 400 additional stalls, bringing the total capacity to 1,500 spaces. Light rail service began on December 6, 2025, after a ribbon-cutting ceremony and a community festival hosted by the Federal Way Black Collective.

== Station layout ==
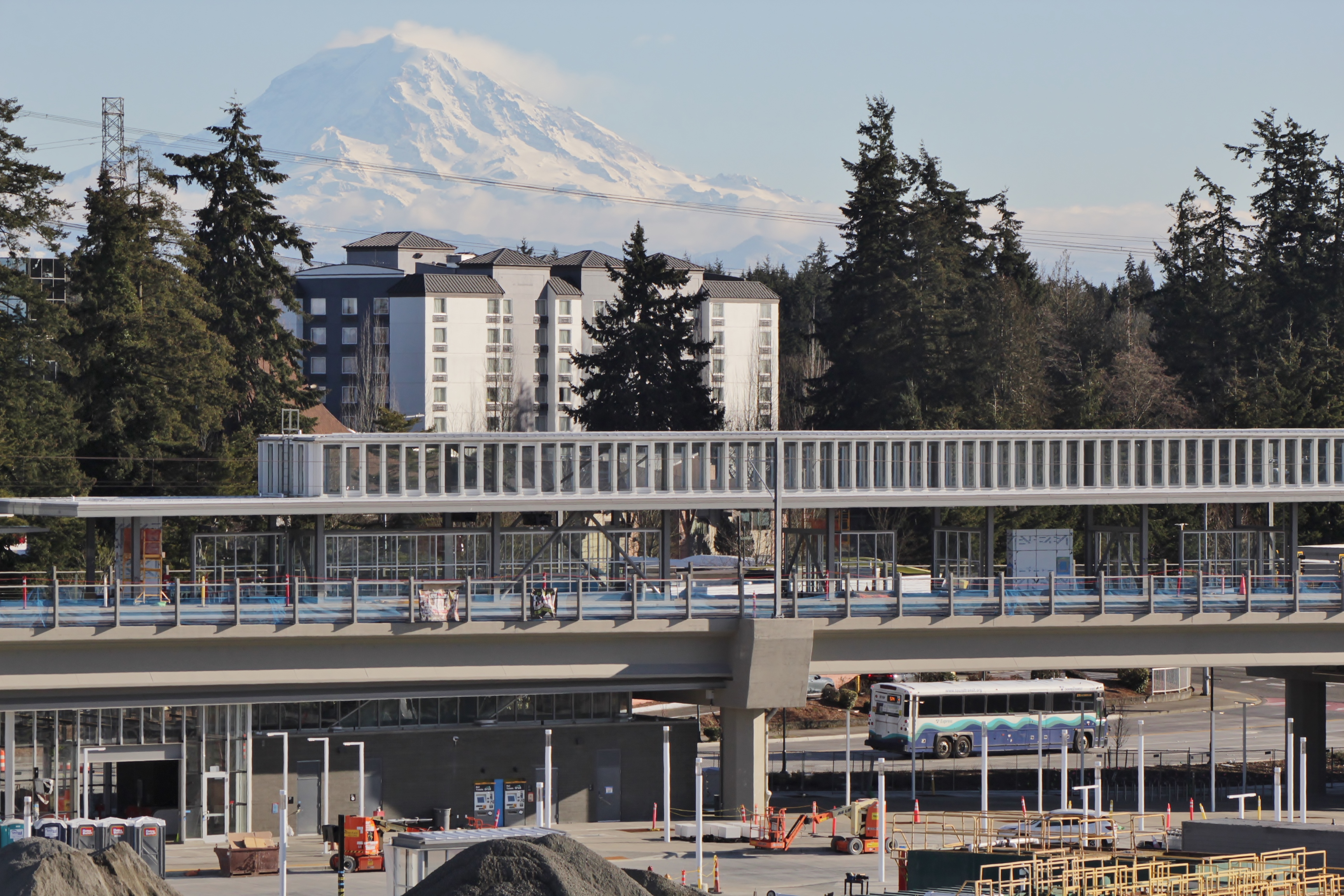
The light rail platform seen during construction with Mount Rainier in the background

Federal Way Downtown station consists of an elevated island platform along the west side of 23rd Avenue South that is aligned northeast–southwest; the tail tracks continue south for 400 feet (120 m) across South 320th Street into the parking lot of the Commons at Federal Way. The platform is accessed through two entrances connected by a set of stairs, escalators, and elevators; these entrances also have ticket vending machines, rider information, and public restrooms. A bus loop with most of the station's 13 bays is immediately west of the platform and connected to nearby streets. The station's five-story parking garage is three blocks northwest of the entrance and has 1,500 stalls; an additional 24 stalls in an outdoor lot are reserved for vehicles needing accessible parking. Bicycle parking is provided in the form of eight lockers and sixty total racks in the garage and near the station entrances.

The station and garage have several pieces of permanent public artwork that were installed as part of Sound Transit's percent for art program. The stairs and escalators are home to Prismatic, a series of glass panels designed by Catherine Widgery to reflect natural light into various colors. Leafy Wader (an anagram of Federal Way) by sculptor Donald Lipski consists of two oversized Tiffany lamps with glass lampshades and lightbulbs installed within the bus loop. The west side of the expanded parking garage is covered by Christine Nguyen's large screen mural A Sound to Mountain. A kinetic sculpture, Hi-Five by Miles Pepper, was installed in 2006 for the transit center at a nearby roundabout and moved to the station's kiss-and-ride area. Lipski originally proposed a three-story piece with a circus elephant balancing on a tall tree trunk with a heron on its trunk; the piece was rejected in 2020 by the Federal Way city council, which stated in a letter that it would make the city the "subject of ridicule and derision".

== Services ==
The station is the southern terminus of the 1 Line, which connects Federal Way to Seattle–Tacoma International Airport, the Rainier Valley, Downtown Seattle, the University of Washington campus, and Snohomish County. The next northbound stop from Federal Way Downtown is Star Lake. Trains on the 1 Line serve Federal Way Downtown station 21 hours a day on weekdays and Saturdays, from 4:30 a.m. to 1:30 a.m.; and eighteen hours on Sundays, from 5:30 a.m. to 12:30 a.m. During regular weekday service, trains operate roughly every eight to ten minutes during rush hour and midday operation, respectively, with longer headways of twelve to fifteen minutes in the early morning and at night. During weekends, 1 Line trains arrive at Federal Way Downtown station every ten minutes during midday hours and every twelve to fifteen minutes during mornings and evenings. The station is approximately 56 minutes from Westlake station in Downtown Seattle and 16 minutes from SeaTac/Airport station.

Federal Way Downtown station is also a major bus hub with 13 bays—11 at a bus loop to the west of the platform and 2 on South 320th Street. King County Metro operates local routes to nearby areas, including Twin Lakes, Kent, and Auburn, as well as express routes to Downtown Seattle and First Hill. The agency's RapidRide A Line, part of its bus rapid transit system, terminates at Federal Way Downtown station and runs north on State Route 99 through SeaTac to Tukwila International Boulevard station. Sound Transit Express operates express routes from the station to Lakewood, Tacoma, Puyallup, Auburn, Seattle–Tacoma International Airport, and Seattle. A night bus operated by Sound Transit to supplement 1 Line service connects Federal Way to Seattle, Seattle–Tacoma International Airport, Tacoma, and Lakewood. Federal Way Downtown station is the northernmost hub for Pierce Transit, which has local routes to Tacoma, Fife, and Milton.
