= RapidRide A Line =

Bus rapid transit route in King County, Washington

A Line

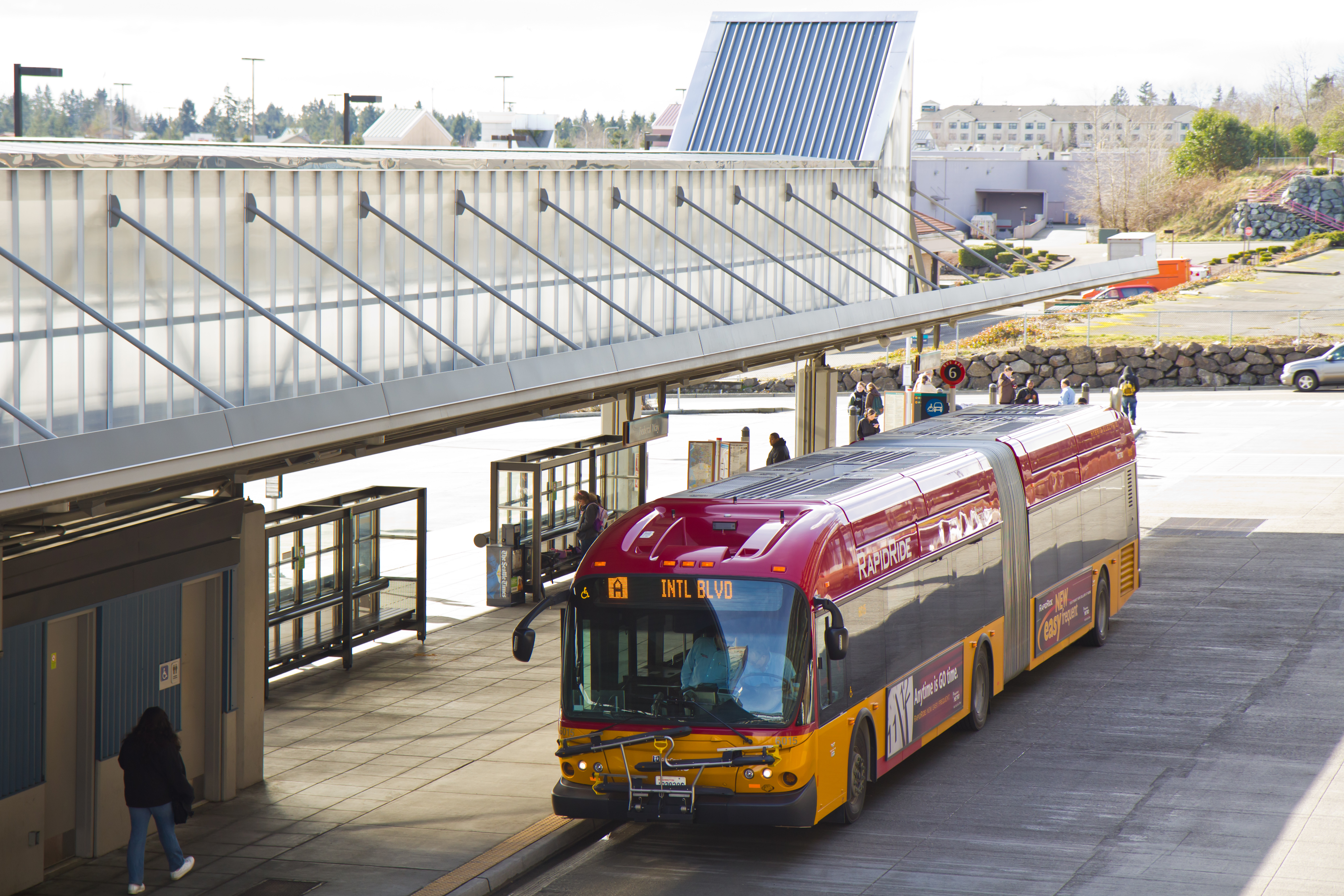
- A Line bus at Federal Way Transit Center, 2011

Overview
- System: RapidRide
- Operator: King County Metro
- Garage: South Base
- Vehicle: New Flyer articulated buses
- Began service: October 2, 2010
- Predecessors: Route 174

Route
- Locale: King County
- Start: Tukwila International Boulevard station
- Via: Pacific Highway South (SR 99)
- End: Federal Way Downtown station
- Length: 11 miles (18 km)

Service
- Frequency: Peak: 10 minutes Off-peak: 15 minutes Late night: 30-70 minutes
- Weekend frequency: 15 minutes (most times)
- Journey time: 44 minutes
- Operates: 24 hours
- Ridership: 10,100 (weekday average, spring 2015)
- Timetable: A Line timetable
- Map: A Line map

The A Line is one of eight RapidRide lines (routes with some bus rapid transit features) operated by King County Metro in King County, Washington. The A Line began service on October 2, 2010, running from Tukwila to Federal Way, mostly along Pacific Highway South. The northern terminus is Tukwila/International Boulevard Station. From there, riders can transfer to Sound Transit's Link light rail, the RapidRide F Line, or to other King County Metro buses that serve Burien, Tukwila, SeaTac, Georgetown, SoDo, and downtown Seattle. Its southern terminus is Federal Way Downtown station and connects riders to buses serving Tacoma, Pierce County, and Auburn. Between the termini there are a total of 13 stations plus 13 intermediate stops.

== History ==
The Tukwila–Federal Way corridor was formerly part of King County Metro route 174, which traveled along Pacific Highway South to Downtown Seattle. It operated nearly a schedule of nearly 24 hours and also served the Seattle–Tacoma International Airport terminal. Route 174 carried an average of 5,570 riders on weekdays during the last month in service. The A Line made its debut on October 2, 2010, with 24 stations between Tukwila International Boulevard station and Federal Way Transit Center. To increase speeds, transit signal priority was installed at some intersections and stop spacing was expanded to 0.5 miles (0.80 km) in some sections. Since the implementation of RapidRide on the corridor, ridership has grown 81 percent and the A Line served an average of 10,100 riders on weekdays in spring 2015.

== Service ==
Headways
Time	Monday-Friday	Weekend/Holidays
4:15 am – 4:45 am	15	30
4:45 am – 7:00 am	15	12-15
7:00 am – 9:00 am	10	12
9:00 am – 2:00 pm	10	12
2:00 pm – 6:00 pm	10	12
6:00 pm – 10:00 pm	12	12
10:00 pm – 4:15 am	30-70	30-70

Between 10:00 pm and 4:15 am, service operates on a schedule; all other times are estimated headways.
