= List of Olmsted parks in Seattle =

In 1903, commissioned by the city of Seattle, Washington, the Olmsted Brothers landscape architects planned many of the parks in the City of Seattle as part of a comprehensive plan to create a greenbelt throughout the city. The planning continued in several phases, culminating in the final Olmsted-planned park, Washington Park Arboretum in 1936.

The existing Seattle Parks and Recreation system has been described as "one of the best-preserved Olmsted park systems in the country". In 2016, the Olmsted parks system was added to the National Register of Historic Places as a multiple property submission.

== 1903 plan ==
- Sunset Hill Park
- Green Lake Park
- Ravenna & Cowen Park
- Woodland Park
- Magnolia Bluff
- Interlaken Park
- Volunteer Park
- Cal Anderson Park
- Madrona Park
- Frink Park
- Colman Park
- Mount Baker Park
- Jefferson Park
- Seward Park

== 1908 plan ==
- Hiawatha Playfield
- Schmitz Park
- Lincoln Park

== Other ==
- Alaska-Yukon-Pacific Exposition (current University of Washington main campus)
- Denny-Blaine Park (One of the "improved parks" mentioned in the Seattle Park Board's annual report for 1909)

The City of Seattle Parks and Recreation department lists a number of other parks, playgrounds, and playfields "influenced or recommended" by the Olmsteds, including the city's largest park: 534-acre (2.16 km^{2}) Discovery Park.
