= Lake Washington Boulevard =

Route through Seattle, Washington

- U.S. National Register of Historic Places
- U.S. Historic district
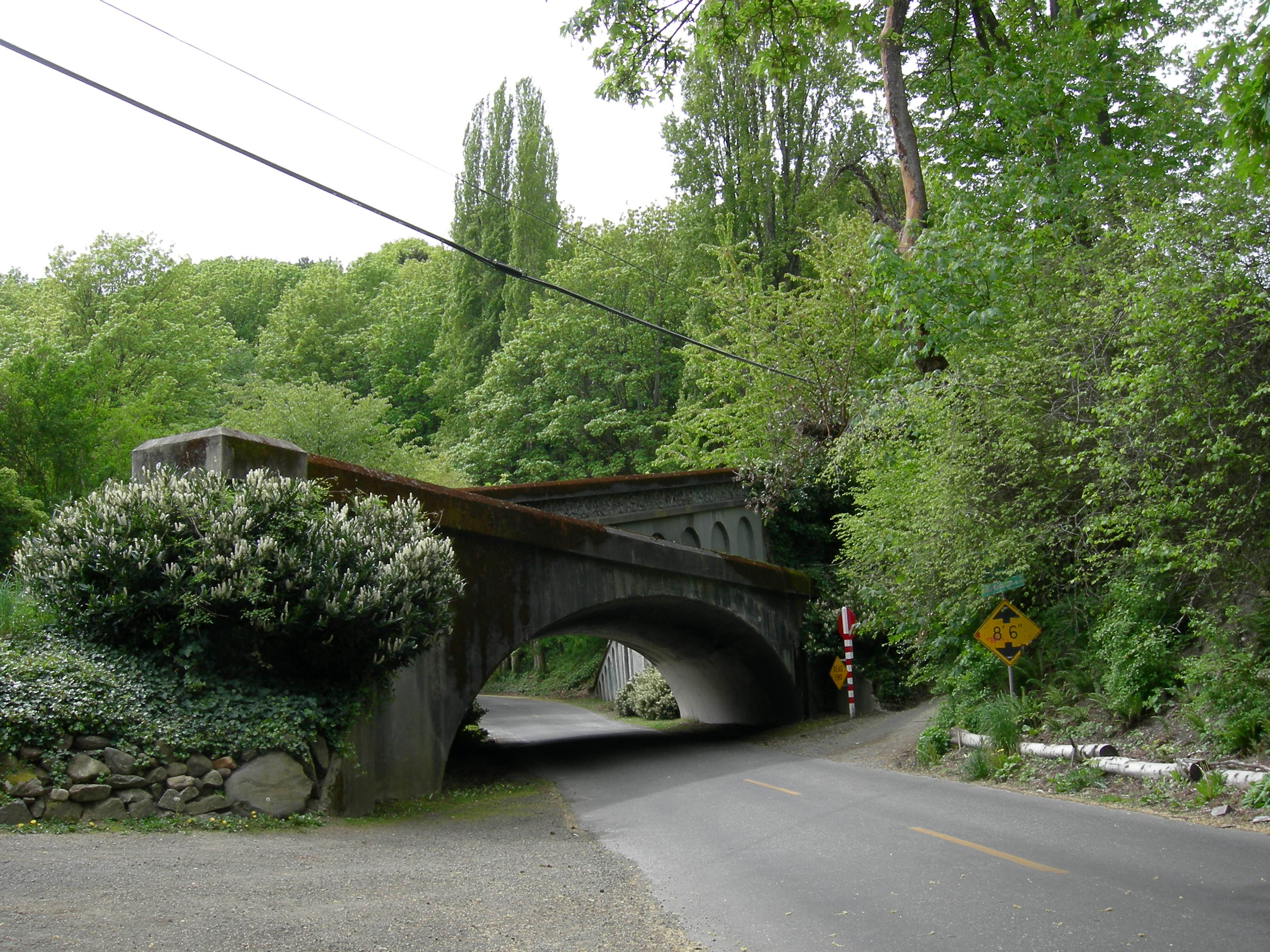
- Near Leschi Park, Lake Washington Boulevard passes under a former cable car bridge that was an extension of present-day Yesler Way to the lake.
- Location: Seattle, Washington, connecting Montlake Boulevard to Seward Park through the Washington Park Arboretum
- Coordinates: 47°36′34″N 122°16′59″W
- Area: 166.6 acres (67.4 ha)
- Built: 1904–1963
- Architect: John Charles Olmsted, Olmsted Brothers
- Engineer: Reginald H. Thomson, Samuel C. Lancaster
- MPS: Seattle's Olmstead Parks and Boulevards MPS
- NRHP reference No.: 100000989
- Added to NRHP: May 8, 2017

Lake Washington Boulevard is a scenic, approximately 8-mile (13 km), road through Seattle, Washington, that hugs Lake Washington for much of the route. There are views of the lake, small sections of rainforest, meadows, and views of the Cascade mountains. At its northern end, Lake Washington Boulevard originates as East Lake Washington Boulevard at Montlake Boulevard East, soon becomes Lake Washington Boulevard East, and runs through the length of the Washington Park Arboretum. The road begins at S. Juneau Street in Seward Park, running thence along the lake to Colman Park, just south of Interstate 90. From here north to E. Alder Street in Leschi, the lakeside road is named Lakeside Avenue, and Lake Washington Boulevard diverts to a winding route through Colman, Frink, and Leschi Parks. At E. Alder, the boulevard once again runs along the lake through Madrona Park to just north of Madrona Drive, where private residences occupy the shore. At E. Denny-Blaine Place, the road heads northwest, through Lakeview Park and the grounds of The Bush School, to the south entrance of the Arboretum at E. Madison Street. It continues through the Arboretum. Just north of E. Roanoke Street, the boulevard turns due west and changes from Lake Washington Boulevard E. to E. Lake Washington Boulevard, following the city's street name designation system. The boulevard ends at the Montlake overpass of 520, where E. Montlake Place E. becomes Montlake Boulevard E.

The road is popular among cyclists—indeed, it was originally conceived as a bicycle path before automobiles had become widespread—and is closed to auto-traffic 33 days out of the year for recreation.

The road was listed on the National Register of Historic Places in 2017.

== Other uses ==
The cities of Newcastle, Bellevue and Kirkland on the Eastside, as well as the city of Renton, also have roads along the lakefront with the same name; the Eastside road was once continuous and paved in 1932.

== See also ==
- National Register of Historic Places listings in Seattle
