= Denny Blaine Park =

Park in Seattle

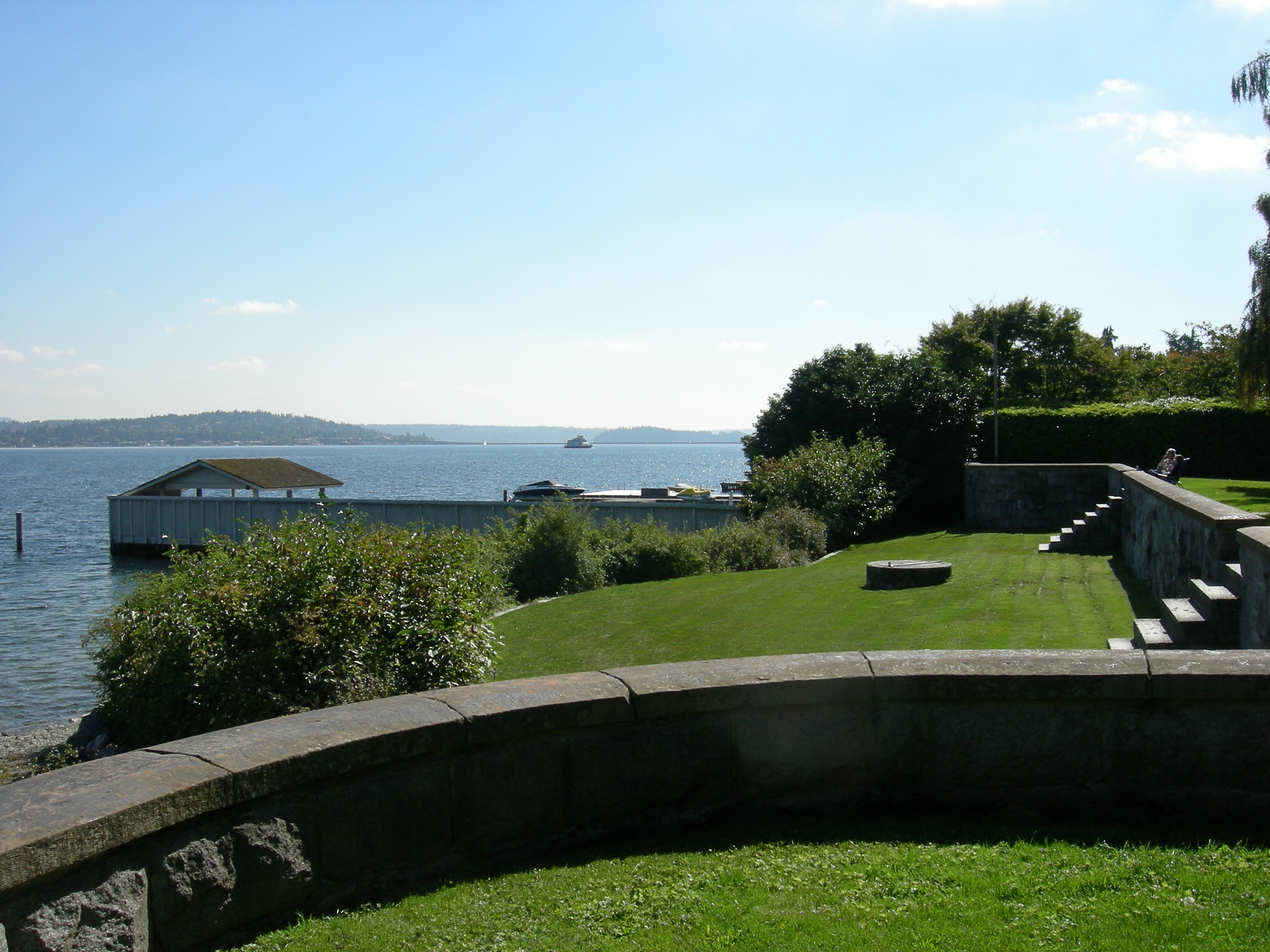
- Denny Blaine Park in 2007
- Interactive map of Denny Blaine Park
- Type: Urban Park
- Location: 200 E Lake Washington Blvd; Seattle, Washington, 98112
- Coordinates: 47°37′12″N 122°16′49″W
- Area: 2 acres (8,100 m^{2})
- Operator: Seattle Parks and Recreation

Denny Blaine Park is a 2 acres (8,100 m^{2}) water-front park in the Denny-Blaine neighborhood of Seattle, Washington. With picturesque views of Bellevue directly across the lake and Mount Rainier in the distance, it is primarily used for picnicking, sunbathing, and swimming. The park has also been one of Seattle's unofficial queer- and trans-friendly clothing optional beaches since the 1970s.

The park area consists of three tiers, in addition to a grassy area within the oval loop of E. Denny Blaine Place. The upper level between the parking lot and the original seawall is grass covered and has several large trees that provide shade. The middle level between the lake-side base of the seawall and the beach area is also grass. The lower lake level encompasses a sandy beach area with a rocky shoreline that is covered with small, smooth river pebble extending the first few feet into the lake.

Denny Blaine Park is located on the western shore of Lake Washington, where historic Lake Washington Boulevard turns inland towards Washington Park Arboretum. It is sometimes referred to as Denny Blaine Beach.

Nearby public beaches with lifeguard and full handicap accessibility include Madrona Park 0.8 miles (1.3 km) south and Madison Park 1.3 miles (2.1 km) north. Other parks in close vicinity include Viretta Park, Howell Park, and Lakeview Park.

== History ==
=== From private land to a park for the Public and for the City of Seattle ===
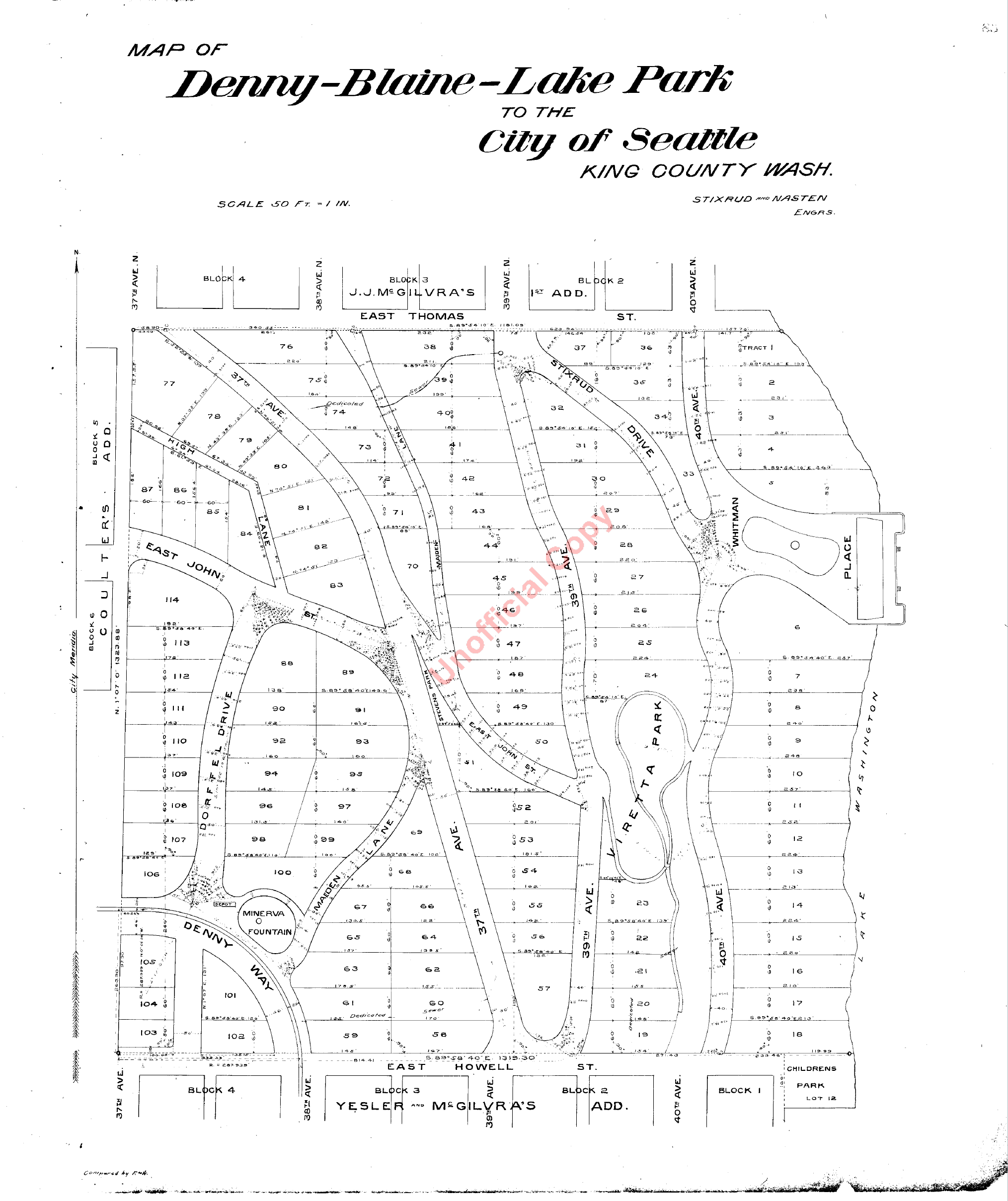
Map of the Denny-Blaine-Lake Park Addition (including depiction of the seawall and stairs at Denny Blaine Park) from the original plat filed by Charles L. and Viretta Denny on April 15, 1901

Denny Blaine Park (as it is now named) was created on April 15, 1901 when the plat for the Denny-Blaine-Lake Park Addition was filed with the city of Seattle. As part of the plat filing, which also established four other parks, landowners Charles L. Denny and Viretta Denny (husband and wife) dedicated all of the streets, lanes, parks, fountains, and places therein "to the use of the Public and the City of Seattle forever".

E. F. Blaine and C. L. Denny were proponents of open space parks for use by anyone in the city rather than restricting use to the residents within the subdivision, or alternatively, developing the parks for commercial recreation, amusement, or carnival-type activities such as at Madrona and Leschi parks to the south. The Denny's dedication of these open space parks to the city was like that of David Denny (Charles’ uncle), who donated 6 acres of land in 1883 to create Seattle’s first public park, now named Denny Park in his honor. E. F. Blaine continued to establish his reputation as an aggressive friend of the public open space park concept through his service on the Park Commission from 1902 to 1908.

The park was unnamed in the filed plat. Because the park was located at the end of the oval turn-around named Whitman Place, many people referred to it as Whitman Park though that was never an official name.

A colorized postcard of the park, initially published as early as 1904, labeled it as Denny-Blaine Park, though references to "Denny-Blaine Park" in reports from the Parks Board in the early years included all five parks in the Denny-Blaine-Lake Park subdivision as a single entity. After the City Council—in order to reduce confusion with a Whitman Ave elsewhere in the city—renamed Whitman Place to Denny Blaine Place in 1918, the park area with its newly exposed beach started to become better known as Denny-Blaine Park on its own. Currently, the official park name by Seattle Parks and Recreation omits the hyphen which had been used until at least the 1970s.

Initial construction and landscaping of the park was provided by the Denny Blaine Land Company, which still privately owned the land. During that time, a parks department letter in 1908 and reports through 1916 indicate that maintenance (only) was being provided by the parks department, as required by the conditions of the plat. In 1932, Denny-Blaine Park was transferred to the city and placed under Park Jurisdiction.

=== Inclusion in the Olmsted System of Parks & Boulevards ===
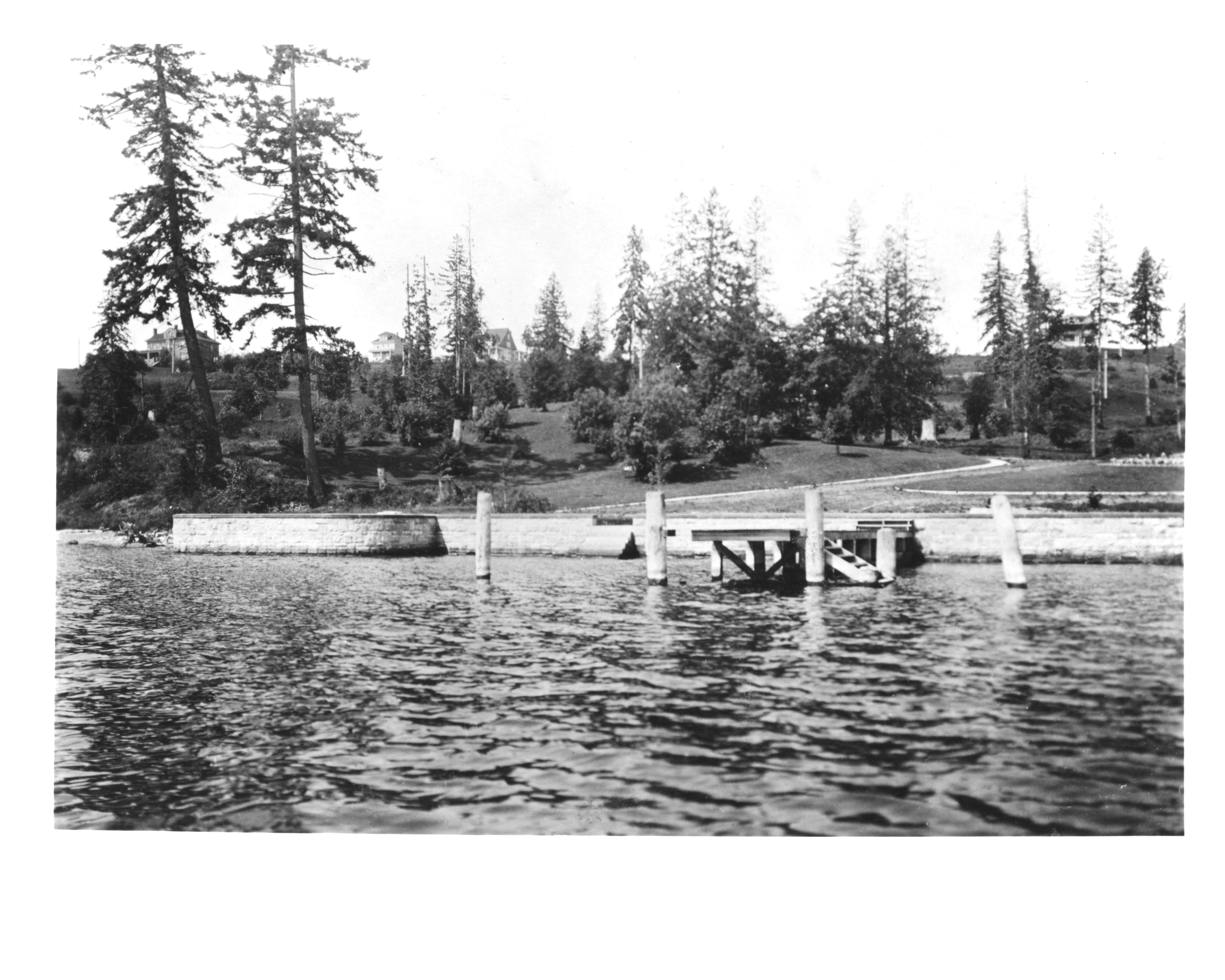
Photo of Denny Blaine Park with seawall and wharf (Olmsted Associates, May 1903), before the water level of Lake Washington was lowered by 9 feet (2.7 m) in 1917

Denny Blaine Park (aka Whitman Place) is referred to as the water terrace located at the North End of Denny Blain-Lake Park in a revised preliminary draft of the 1903 Olmsted Report, sent near the end of July 1903 from John Charles Olmsted to E. F. Blaine, Chairman of the Board of Park Commissioners. In that report, the water terrace location is the reference point at which the proposed pleasure drive running northward along Lake Washington from Bailey Peninsula (Seward Park) transitions inland to run northwest towards Washington Park. Olmsted further recommended that “all the land between these streets (Lake Washington Blvd) and the lake in the Denny-Blaine subdivision should be acquired [by the city]”, an area that, if acquired, would have encompassed both Denny Blaine Park and Howell Park.

Denny Blaine Park (water terrace) is included within the areas marked by Olmsted on the 1903 map, the 1908 map, and the 1928 map of the Olmsted System [of] Parks, Boulevards and Playgrounds of the City of Seattle.

The 1909 Annual Report by the Board of Park Commissioners—which celebrated the history of the Park Board since its founding in 1884 and its success to date implementing the 1903 and 1908 Olmsted reports—included Denny Blaine Park in the list of fully improved parks. The same report also honored the service of retired commissioner Blaine, “father of the Seattle Park System,” who had served from 1902 to 1908.

In 2016, Denny Blaine Park was added to the National Register of Historic Places as part of the multiple property submission for Seattle's Olmsted Parks and Boulevards (1903–68).

=== Features ===
The plat drawing depicts a shoreline “esplanade” along a seawall, located at the end of a wide turnaround that formed an open space loop in the middle. The drawing also appears to depict a fountain within the oval area, but was never installed.

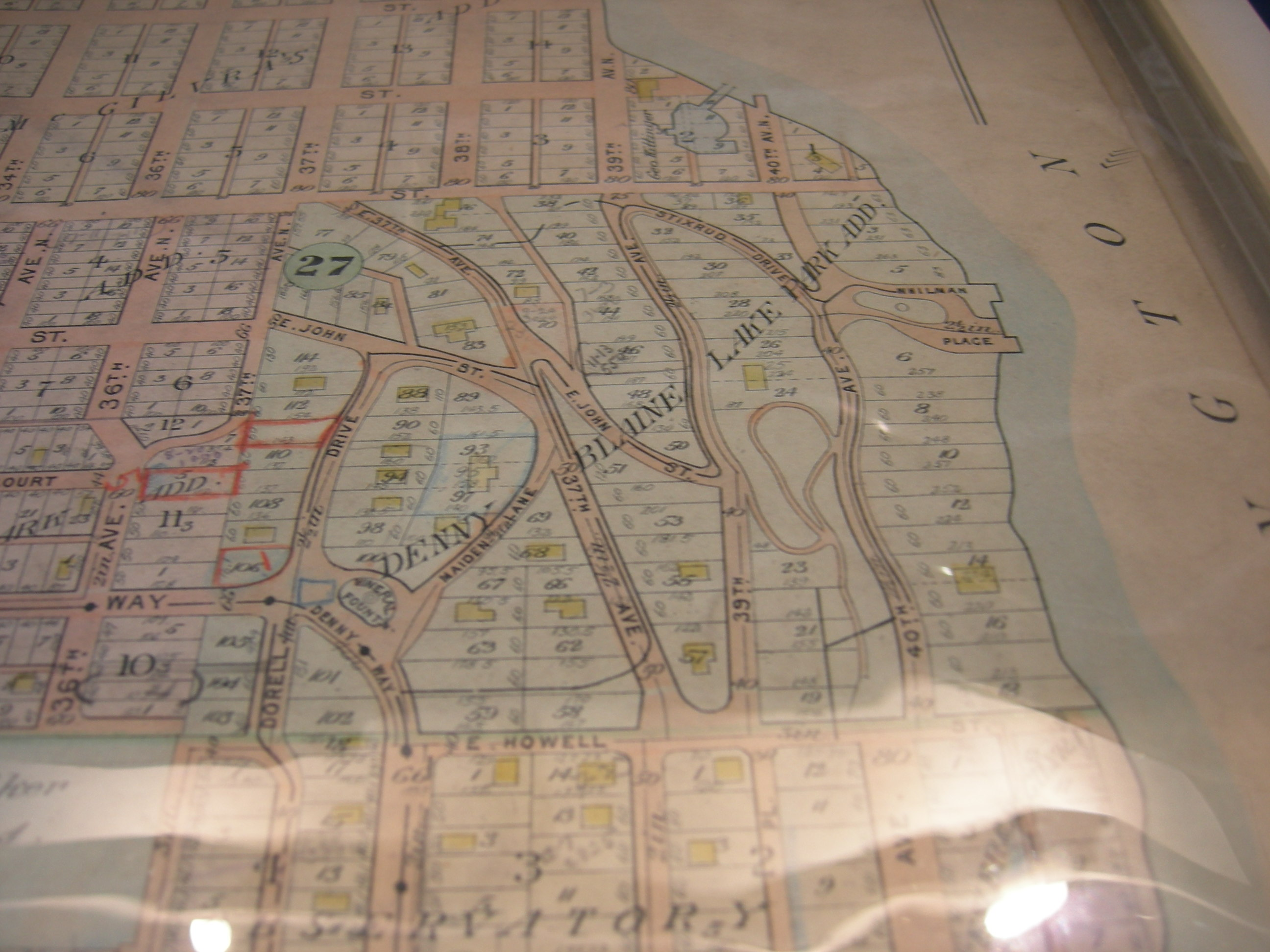
Part of plate 13, Baist's Real Estate Maps of Surveys of Seattle (1905)

The seawall (as drawn in the plat) was already under construction—and likely completed—in 1900, a year before the plat was filed; with the wharf also being built that year or shortly thereafter (no later than May, 1903). Additional features at that time evidently included a boat facility, an oval shaped lagoon with narrow passage to the lake, a small rustic shelter, and paths, lawn, and landscaping.

In 1917, the water level dropped by 9 feet after the anticipated Montlake Cut connecting Lake Washington to South Lake Union was completed, leaving the seawall "high and dry" with a gently sloping beach that became usable after removing exposed debris and smoothing. The seawall remains today as reminder to the original shoreline, and the beach area is reached via the two sets of stairs that had been built into the seawall as depicted on the original plat of 1901.

Around the time Whitney Place was renamed, the turnaround was paved as part of an L.I.D. project.

It is said the actor John Wayne rented the house to the South, and, due to people peeping over the wall, a hedge was put in running along the South border of the park, above the lower beach levels.

Much of a renovation completed in 2004 involved the large middle bed just above the shoreline.

== Topfree and clothing optional use ==
Denny Blaine Park is not designated by Seattle Parks and Recreation as a clothing optional park, though it is recognized that it has been used as such, especially by the queer community, for over 50 years. Thus while clothing optional use is not sanctioned, neither is it unsanctioned since simply being naked in public is not illegal in Seattle. Regular nudists maintain the beach to a degree.

The first recorded (though unlikely the actual first) case of clothing optional use was when famed architect and Denny-Blaine neighbor Ellsworth Storey was arrested at Whitman Place for skinny dipping.

A letter to the Seattle Park Board (circa 1930s) protesting unruly behavior in the park noted "there was an element of young people from 'Coon Hollow' who ... come down there and change their clothes right in the open."

On May 1st, 1934, O. H. Lindstedt, manager of sporting goods at University Book Store, sent a letter to the Seattle Park Board President requesting they stop requiring men to wear body bathing suits at public beaches. Lindstedt noted that men were buying trunks, but avoiding lifeguarded beaches and instead swimming in places that are dangerous or at least unprotected. Denny Blaine Park, situated between public beaches at Madison Park and Madrona Park, would likely be one of the parks where men illegally swam and sunbathed topless in the 1930s.

In the 1970s, women began to go topless at Denny Blaine Park. These women, who predominantly identified as lesbian, referred to the park as Dykekiki Beach (a playful combination of the words Dyke and Waikiki Beach). News reports from the period include accounts that feminist groups on the beach were "fairly aggressive" in chasing other groups out of the park, including "men who come to the park to ogle"; Seattle Police cited 16 women for lewd conduct in one crackdown in 1988.

World Naked Bike Ride (WNBR) Seattle had its bodypainting party at the park on August 17, 2008, and returned on August 16, 2009, with Hemp Ride 2009 (affiliated with WNBR Seattle).

In 2010, several Seattle Parks and Recreation workers reported nudity and topless usage used to be more common; and male nudists cited different parks that were being commonly used as unofficial nude beaches at that time.

Clothing optional use at Denny Blaine Park became more diverse across gender and sexual orientation starting in the mid-2010s and has continued to grow in popularity, including a substantial increase by Seattle's transgender community, especially in the years following the COVID lockdown. On warm summer days, it is not uncommon for all three tiers of the park to be fully utilized. The diversity and current popularity of the park was demonstrated on December 6, 2023 when an overflow crowd of around 400 people attended a Seattle Parks and Recreation community response meeting to voice their opposition to a proposed children's play area and to speak on public record about how significant Denny Blaine Park—as a queer- and trans-friendly clothing optional park and beach—has been to them, with many sharing poignant and personal testimonies.

== Controversies ==
=== Neighborhood Park vs. City-wide Public Park usage ===
During the 1930s, after the beach began attracting use from those outside of the neighborhood and because the Park Board could not find monies for a lifeguard at this small beach, the Ostranders and other near-by eminent neighbors (“a veritable 'who’s who' of Old Seattle”) filed complaints with the Parks Board and urged that bathing be prohibited. They even provided a sketch for a proposed sign that stated, “NO SWIMMING OR PICNICING (Parks Dept.) / Violators will be arrested” and listed alternate parks as "Madison Public Beach (1 mile) / Madrona Public Beach (1 mile)". The Park Superintendent rejected posting the sign and refused to disallow public bathing. Such refusal to treat Whitman Place as a neighborhood park (similar to a refused request by neighbors of Madrona Park) is consistent not only with the founding intention of Denny and Blaine, but also that park was maintained by public funds and that (as of 1932) the park had been transferred to Park jurisdiction.

=== Top-free and naked usage ===
Prior to 1990, the Seattle Police Department would periodically issue citations under a then-current lewd conduct ordinance (City of Seattle 12A.10.070), though many continued with their top-free or even naked usage as a form of self-expression or even protest. In 1988, in an article titled "The Cops and The Tops", the Seattle Weekly reported that police were citing nude sunbathers at Denny-Blaine beach for "lewd conduct" for the second year in a row. "For many women, it's a matter of pride, and of gender politics, so they have continued to swim shirtless despite the tickets and the police patrols," the article said.

After the city dropped the lewd conduct ordinance in 1990 following a ruling against them in Seattle v. Johnson, simply being top-free or even fully naked in public was no longer illegal conduct — despite frustrations periodically expressed through neighborhood community associations or via direct calls to the police.

=== Proposal to create a play area for neighborhood children ===
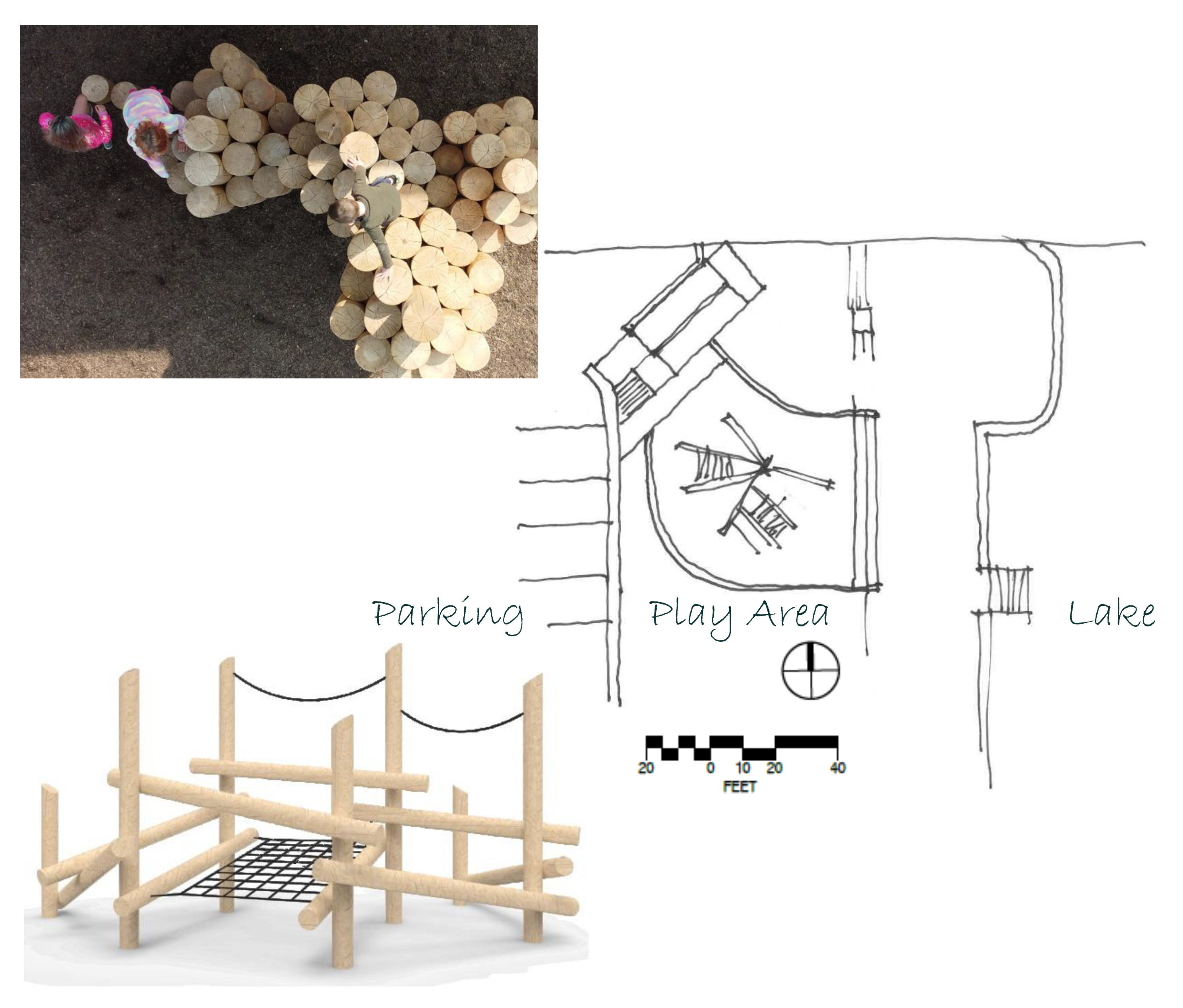
Proposed play area at Denny Blaine Park

In 2023, Stuart Sloan, the owner of a 8,310-square-foot waterfront mansion that neighbors the park, began sending text messages to the personal cell phone number of Seattle Mayor Bruce Harrell, complaining about the nude sunbathers at Denny Blaine Park.

In the following months, Sloan met with a variety of City of Seattle officials to discuss building a playground at the park, ostensibly to curb nudity at the beach. According to a donation budget breakdown, Sloan committed to a donation of "$1 million in 'private funds'" for the proposed park.

Seattle Parks and Recreation staff presented the proposed play area during its November 2023 Board of Parks and Recreation Commissioners meeting, noting that it would be fully funded by an anonymous donor who initiated the proposal contingent on it being built at Denny Blaine Park. The play area, suitable for toddlers, would utilize one sixth of the upper tier space and consist of a single play element made from natural materials.

During the proposal presentation, the following beneficial factors were cited:

1. Availability of funding;
2. Fills gap in play area coverage for this area, defined by the ability to walk within 15 minutes;
3. Supports the youth initiative priority;
4. Addresses a nature deficit; and
5. Increases accessibility to the shoreline.

The following challenges were also noted:

1. The site is currently used as a clothing optional (nudist) park and is currently noted as such according to the city's mitigation plan;
2. The site is a historic Olmsted park, with classical forms that are reminiscent of Olmstead design;
3. The site would require improvements to comply with the Americans with Disabilities Act (ADA);
4. The city would be obligated to reimburse the donor if the project is started but not completed;
5. There is limited shoreline access, so why put a kids area at this one (vs. at Madrona Beach);
6. The park has a long tradition of use by the LGBTQIA+ community along with other clothing-optional users who will object to being displaced; and
7. The park serves the entire city, not just the neighborhood.

At the conclusion, the presenter noted the next step was to gather community input before moving on to planning and permitting. The attending commissioners stressed that gathering this feedback was very important, including from the current users of the park.

As anticipated by the commissioners, the proposed play area generated a strong outcry from the LGBTQIA+ community and others who value continued clothing-optional use at Denny Blaine Park. This response included creating a Save Denny Blaine! information website, a petition to Halt the Construction of a Children's Play Area at Denny Blaine Park that received over 9,000 signatures, and a Save Denny Blaine website page to contact elected officials. The public response meeting held in the auditorium of the Martin Luther King FAME Community Center on December 6, 2023 was attended by an overflow crowd of about 400 people who were nearly unanimous in their opposition to the proposal.

On December 8, 2023, Seattle Parks and Recreation announced the proposed play area project would not proceed, citing the feedback they received about the cohesion the current park usage brought to the LGBTQIA+ community and the potential unintended consequences of placing a play area at that beach. The announcement indicated they will evaluate other locations for a play area and will meet with leaders in the LGBTQIA+ community to “better understand the importance of this beach to the community and the hopes for future uses.”

On December 9, 2023, the day following the announcement that the project would not proceed, Mayor Harrell met with the would-be donor Stuart Sloan at University Village, the mall Sloan owns. According to the Mayor's office, though, the Mayor did not know the identity of the anonymous donor and he did not discuss the donation for this project with Sloan at this meeting. A July 2024 report by KUOW-FM reviewed March 2023 text messages between Mayor Harrell and donor Sloan. This report found that the two had discussed the park, with Sloan sending pictures of nude park visitors to Harrell during his vacation, and the mayor responding to tell Sloan that, "If you are disgusted I share your disgust." The text messages also revealed ongoing collaboration between Sloan and Harrell, which contradicted the earlier claim that the mayor had no knowledge about the identity of the donor.

Since the decision to scrap the park proposal, neighbors of the park and activists who have organized a Friends of Denny Blaine Park group have met regularly with the Seattle Parks Foundation, a nonprofit that helps bridge the gap between private money and government agencies, in an attempt to "end years of conflict over the beach." In June 2024, the City put forth a policy suggestion, which would create two zones in Denny Blaine Park: "naked Zone A, composed of the grassy area and beach, and a clothed Zone B, consisting of the loop of road... outside the park where several neighbors live."

=== 2025 preliminary injunction ===
On July 14, 2025, a King County Superior Court judge found that the nudity "as constituted" at the park constituted a public nuisance and granted a preliminary injunction, but denied the complainant's request to immediately close the park. Instead, the judge ordered the city to submit a plan of abatement within 14 days of the order. A construction site style chainlink fence with green mesh attached to the side was installed, partially blocking view of the beach as part of the abatement plan.

=== 2026 court order ===
On July 15, 2026, following a month-long trial, a King County Superior Court judge ordered that Denny Blaine Park would remain open but that the city must take steps to prevent "lewd" behavior that constitutes a public "nuisance".
