= Lakeview Park (Seattle) =

Park in Seattle, Washington

- Mud Park
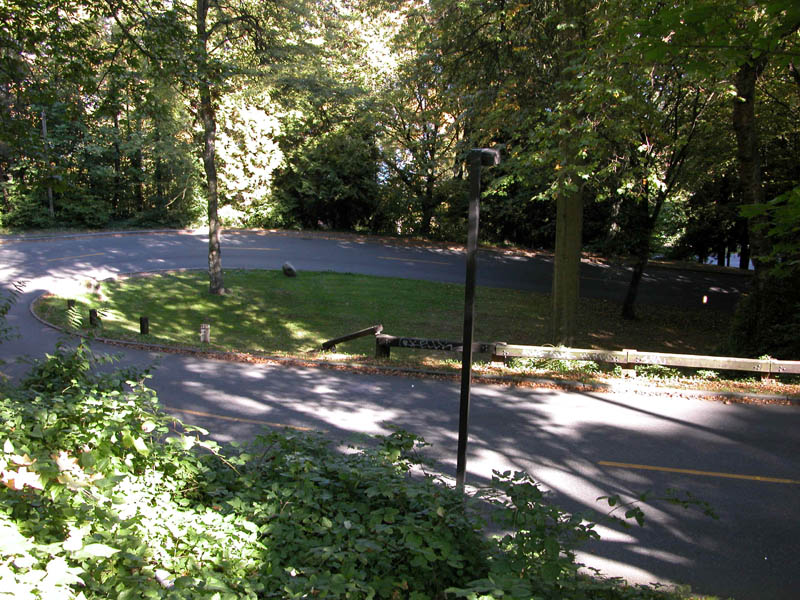
- Lakeview Park from Lake Washington Boulevard E.
- Interactive map of Lakeview Park
- Type: Urban Park
- Location: Seattle, Washington
- Coordinates: 47°37′19″N 122°17′04″W
- Area: 4.5 acres (18,000 m^{2})
- Operator: Seattle Parks and Recreation

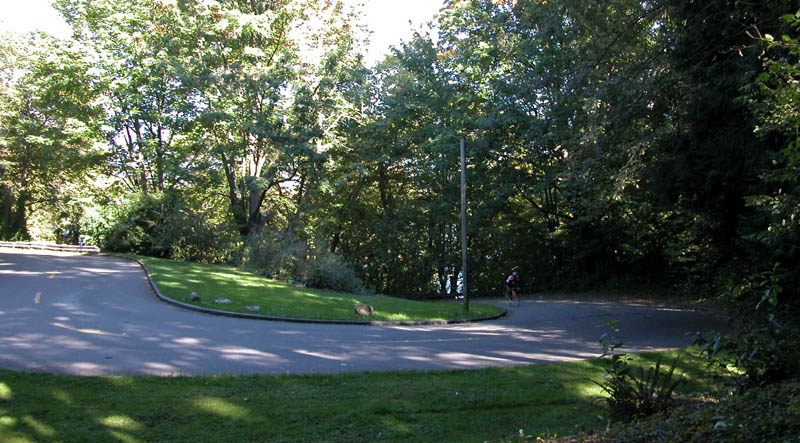
Another hairpin curve in the boulevard

Lakeview Park is a 4.5-acre (18,000 m^{2}) park in the Denny-Blaine neighborhood of Seattle, Washington, designed as part of the Olmsted Brothers park system in Seattle. It is located on both sides of Lake Washington Boulevard. as it winds down a hillside toward Lake Washington. The western half is a bowl-like park with grass and trees along 37th Ave E. and E. Harrison Street; the eastern half incorporates a lookout at the end of E. Harrison Street and undeveloped hillside between Hillside Drive E. and McGilvra Boulevard E.

The upper campus of The Bush School is located across E. Harrison Street and Hillside Drive E. from the park.

Lakeview Park is also known to many as Mud Park because in the rain it becomes somewhat of a mud pit.
