= Leschi, Seattle =

- Neighborhood
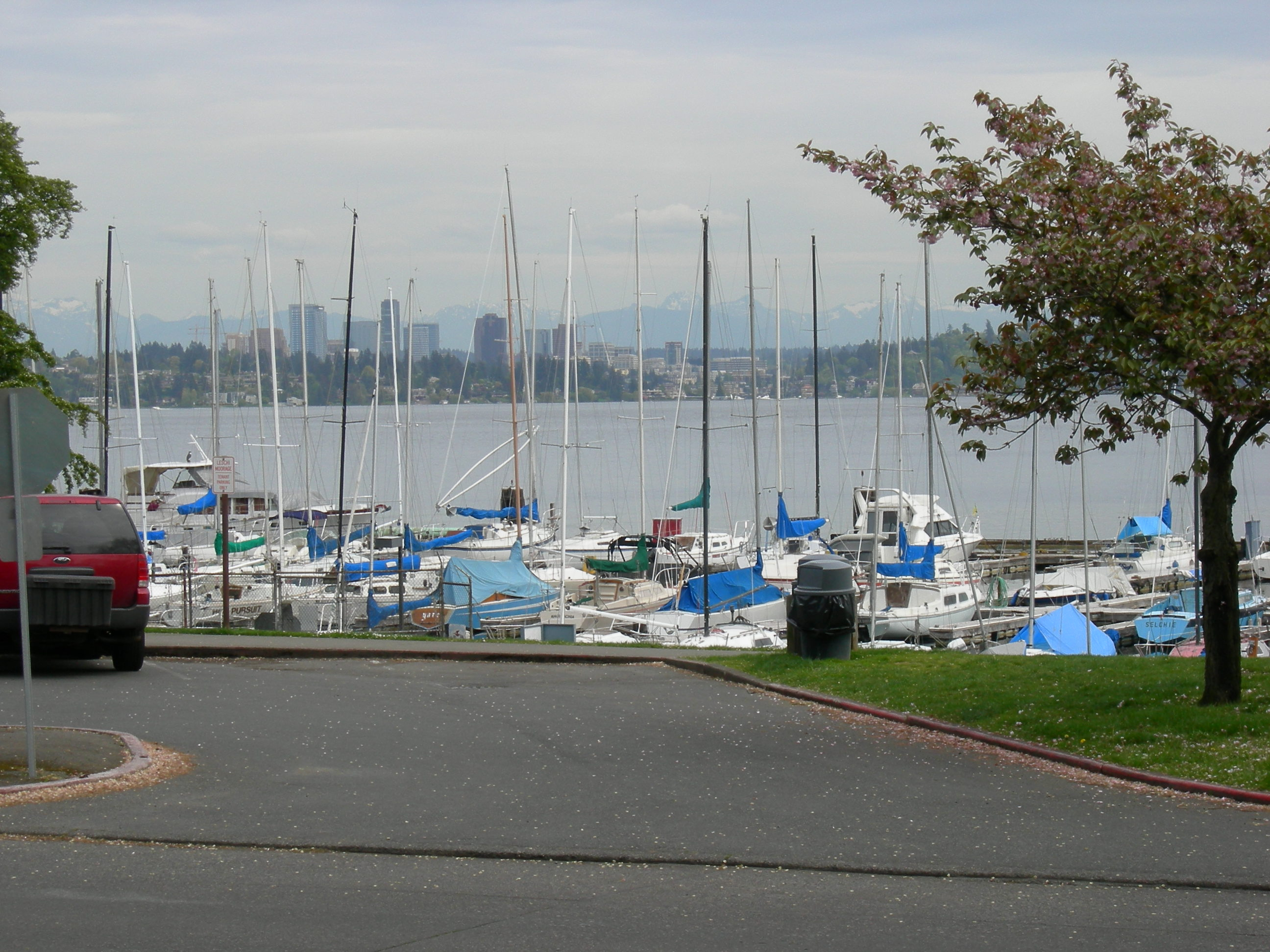
- Marina on Lake Washington seen from Leschi Park, 2007

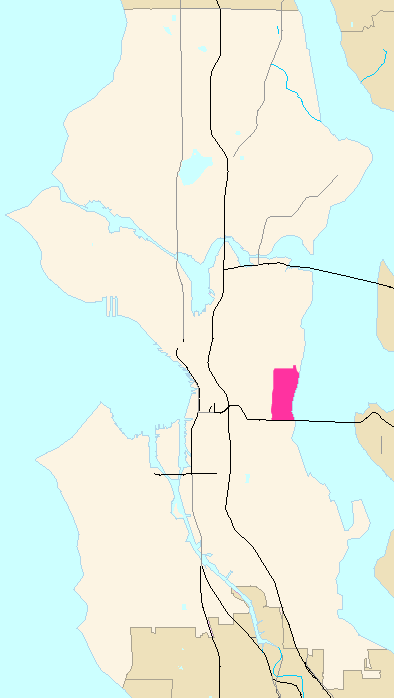
- Leschi Highlighted in Pink
- Coordinates: 47°36′1″N 122°17′34″W
- Country: United States
- State: Washington
- County: King
- City: Seattle
- ZIP Code: 98122, 98144
- Area Code: 206, 564

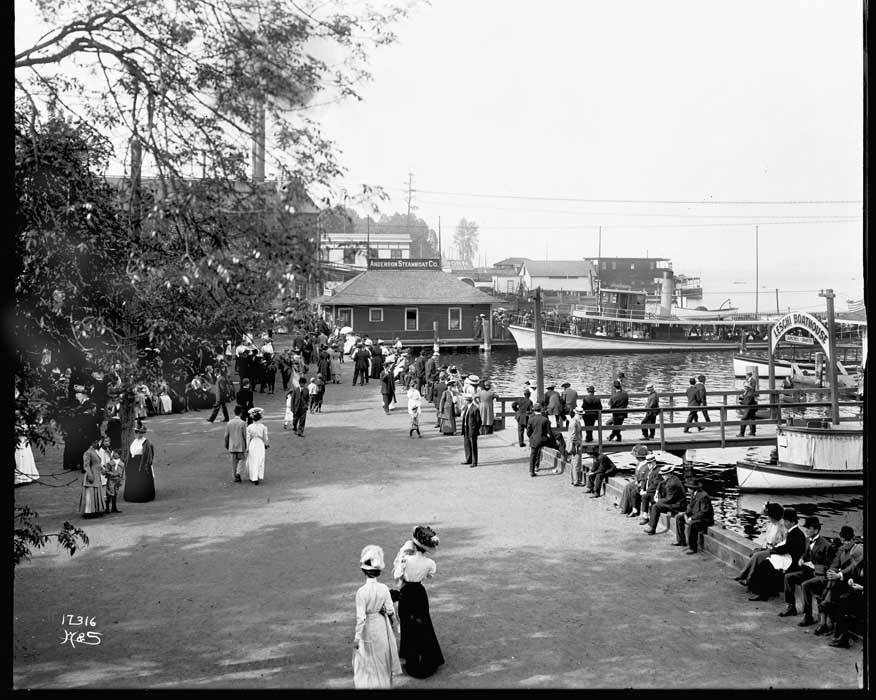
Leschi Park and boat dock, ca. 1910

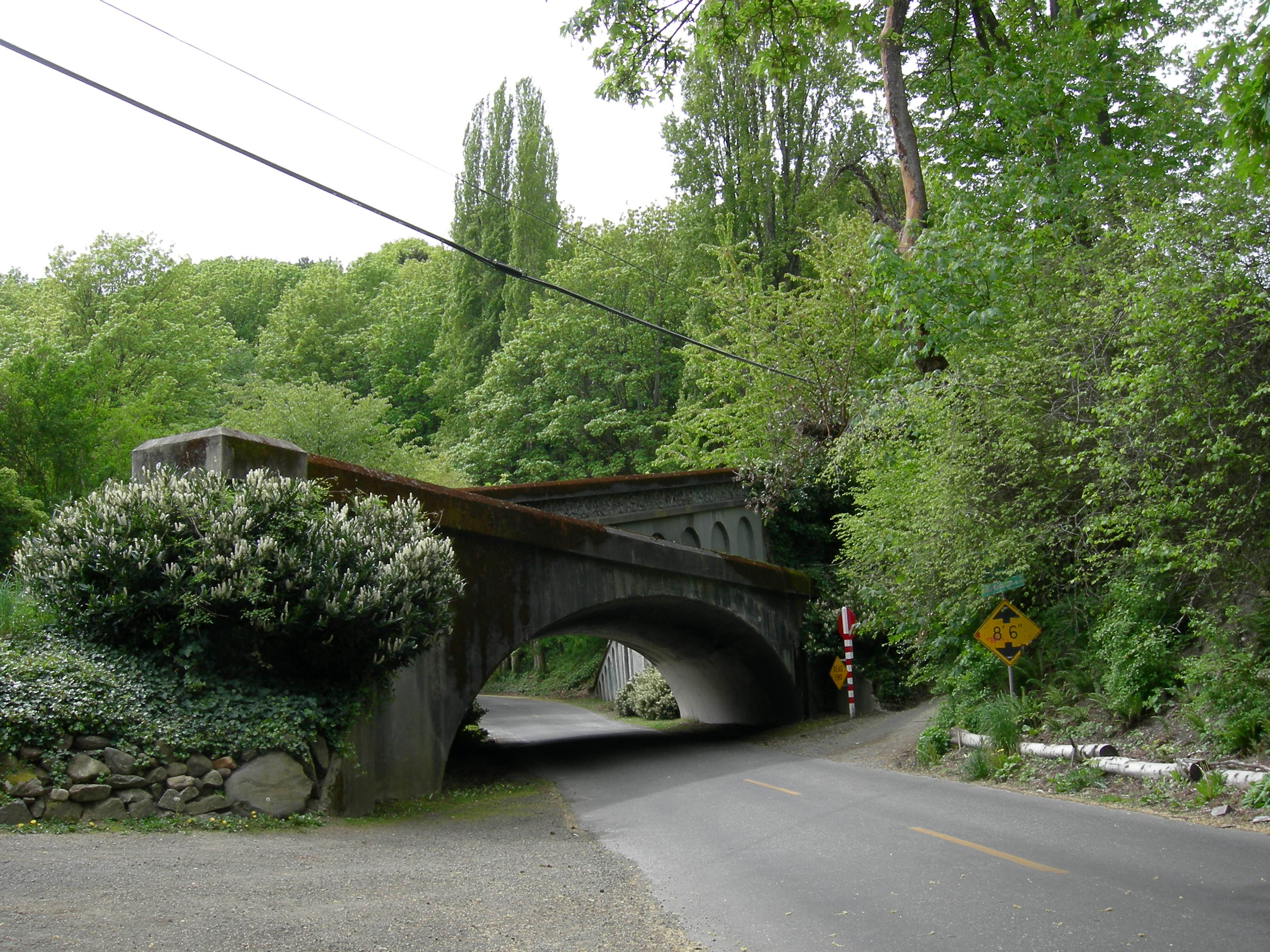
Former cable car bridge over Lake Washington Blvd. 2007

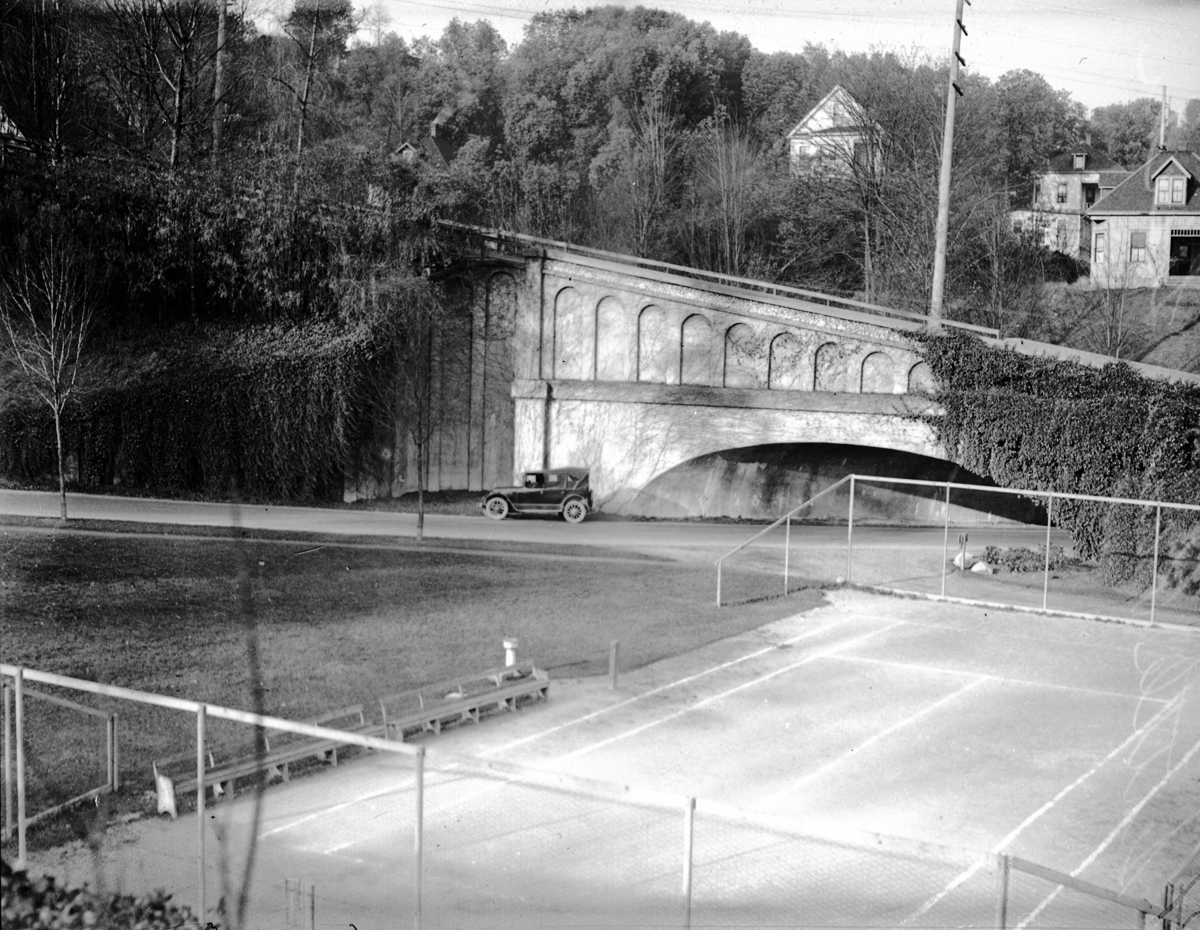
Cable Car Bridge, 1930

Leschi is a neighborhood in the city of Seattle, Washington, United States. Located on the western shore of Lake Washington, the residential neighborhood was named by its 19th-century developer for Chief Leschi of the Nisqually tribe, who was executed by territorial authorities in 1858 in Pierce County, Washington.

== Location ==
The Leschi neighborhood is bordered by Lake Washington on the east, Interstate 90 on the south, beyond which is Mount Baker, Martin Luther King Jr. Way on the west, beyond which is the Central District and East Cherry Street on the north, beyond which is Madrona.

== Homes ==
Residences in Leschi include condominiums (especially along the lake), refurbished bungalows and craftsman, contemporary styles, bricks, Tudors and mid-century ramblers. Curvy streets wind away up the hill from the lakefront, which means many residences get at least a partial lake view. The Seattle Post-Intelligencer described Leschi as "not an exclusive enclave for the rich, despite its million-dollar lakefront homes" and a "home to a racially and economically diverse group of people." The area "mix[es] stately turn-of-the century houses with far more modest homes".

== Parks ==
There are many parks, including the popular Leschi lakeside park and other pocket parks spread throughout the neighborhood. Notable neighborhood parks include Frink Park, Flo Ware Park, Powell Barnett Park, and the "String of Pearls", which refers to a "series of mini parks along Lake Washington at the end of east/west streets that run right to the lake."

According to legend, Leschi Park was a campsite of Chief Leschi of the Nisqually tribe. Chief Leschi was executed for his participation in the Battle of Seattle and the Yakima Wars (1855-1858). The 1854 treaty which took away native lands led to an attack on the settlement in 1856. Many tribe members and two settlers were killed, and Leschi was subsequently tortured and hanged.

In 1889, the site was developed as an amusement park, at the eastern end of the Lake Washington Cable Railway's trolley line. The attractions included a casino, gardens, boat rentals, and a zoo. The zoo animals were donated to the City in 1903, and the site itself was sold to the City in 1909. It was adapted as one of Seattle's earliest parks. Today, Leschi Park is a well-manicured, rolling hillside of grass planted with exotic trees and gardens of roses. Pathways follow an undulating terrain to restrooms above. One path leads to a tennis court, and another goes on up to a playground with slides and a sand box. A grassy spot under willows on the east side of Lakeside S. has a view of acres of moored sailboats and an old-time ferry.

Since the earliest days of Seattle history, Frink Park served as a natural woodland park where city residents could enjoy mountain and sound views. Set aside as a "private" park in 1883, the main portion of the park was later purchased by Seattle parks commissioner John M. Frink and his wife Abbie H. Frink and donated to the City on October 25, 1906.

In 1908 the City authorized the Board of Park Commissioners to acquire additional land adjacent southeast to the Frink park property. Other lands were given as gifts; however, the City condemned several lots just south of today’s Frink Boulevard to make room for the parkway connecting Leschi and Frink parks. Today, Friends of Frink Park work to preserve the natural urban forest unique to the Park. These local stewards are united in ensuring the Park’s continued importance to the local residents and the city that visionaries John Frink and the Olmsted brothers foresaw.

Flo (Florasina) Ware (1912-1981) was the quintessential activist, known in Seattle for raising a voice on behalf of children, the elderly, and the poor. In 1982, a Seattle Parks playfield at 28th & Jackson was named in her honor. The park received a $540,000 renovation in 2002 which included art installations commemorating her life work. In recent years, it has been the site of free music events sponsored by the Leschi Community Council.

Powell Barnett Park was originally selected by the City Planning Commission as the "east Junior High School Site" and was developed as a running track and athletic field by nearby Garfield High School. Upon the acquisition and development of a playfield at the school, the "Garfield Track" was abandoned in 1962. It was sold to the Department of Parks in 1966. Playground improvements were accomplished in 1967 by the community through the Central Area Motivation Program. Upon suggestion of the Leschi Improvement Council (renamed the Leschi Community Council) in 1969, the playground was named in honor of Powell Barnett. He was a man of many interests and great energy, much of which was directed toward improving race relations and civic unity. Barnett organized the Leschi Improvement Council and became its first president in 1958, led in organizing the East Madison YMCA, served as chairman of its board, and chaired a committee that revised the Seattle Urban League, thus saving its membership in the Community Chest. On May 19, 2006, the community, Starbucks and the City of Seattle celebrated the completion of an Ultimate Parks Makeover of Powell Barnett Park.

== Seattle Municipal Street Railway cable car ==
Between September 27, 1888, and August 10, 1940, a Seattle Municipal Street Railway cable car ran along Yesler Way from Pioneer Square to Lake Washington.

Historic photographs:

- Leschi ferry landing, 1914, from the Seattle Municipal Archives
- Seattle Municipal Street Railway cable car in Leschi Park, 1938, article at the San Francisco Cable Car Museum
