= Mount Baker Park =

Park in Seattle, Washington, United States

- Interactive map of Mount Baker Park
- Location: Seattle, Washington, U.S.
- Coordinates: 47°34′59″N 122°17′18″W
- Owner: Seattle Parks and Recreation
- Mount Baker Park and Boulevard
- U.S. National Register of Historic Places
- Location within Washington (state)
- Location: Seattle, Washington, U.S.
- Area: 21.7 acres (8.8 ha)
- Built: 1909
- Architect: Olmsted Brothers
- NRHP reference No.: 100004961
- Added to NRHP: February 10, 2020

Mount Baker Park is a 21.7-acre (8.8 ha) urban park in Seattle, Washington, United States. It is located along a ravine in the Mount Baker neighborhood in the Rainier Valley, stretching from South McClellan Street in the south to Lake Washington Boulevard at its north end. The park's north end is adjacent to Mount Baker Beach on Lake Washington and Colman Park. The south end connects to Mount Baker Boulevard, a scenic street that continues southwest to Franklin High School and the Mount Baker light rail station.

Mount Baker Park was one of several created by the 1903 Olmsted Brothers plan for Seattle. It was constructed in 1909 and expanded after the lowering of Lake Washington in 1917. It was added to the National Register of Historic Places on February 10, 2020, alongside Colman Park.
