= Madrona Park =

Madrona Park may refer to the following parks in the United States:

- Madrona Park (Seattle), Washington
- Madrona Park (Portland, Oregon)
