= Baker Park =

Baker Park may refer to:

- Alton Baker Park in Oregon, USA
- Baker Park (Calgary) in Alberta, Canada
- Mount Baker Park in Washington, USA
- Robert Baker Park in Maryland, USA
- Sam A. Baker State Park in Missouri, USA
