= Madrona Creek =

Stream in Seattle, Washington, U.S.

Coordinates: 47°36′36.2″N 122°17′3.1″W

Madrona Creek is a stream in the Madrona neighborhood of Seattle, Washington, United States, located within Madrona Park. A daylighting project to restore the creekbed from above 38th Avenue downhill to Lake Washington is underway as of 2006.
