= Colman Park =

Park in Seattle, Washington, US

- Interactive map of Colman Park
- Location: Seattle, Washington, U.S.
- Coordinates: 47.583502°N 122.288303°W
- Owner: Seattle Parks and Recreation
- Colman Park and Dose Terrace Stairs
- U.S. National Register of Historic Places
- Location within Washington (state)
- Location: Seattle, Washington, U.S.
- Area: 24.3 acres (9.8 ha)
- Built: 1910s
- Architect: Olmsted Brothers
- NRHP reference No.: 100004959
- Added to NRHP: February 10, 2020

Colman Park is a 24.3-acre (98,000 m^{2}) park in the Mount Baker neighborhood of Seattle, Washington, located just south of the Lacey V. Murrow Memorial Bridge (Interstate 90) along Lake Washington and inland to 31st Avenue S.

It was listed on the National Register of Historic Places in 2020, alongside the adjacent Mount Baker Park.

== History ==
In 1881 the Town Council authorized the first "municipal" water company which took over a maze of privately owned systems and was authorized to charge for water service.

Appropriately named "The Spring Hill Water Co.", the needs of a growing town were served by building a pumping plant "all the way over here" on Lake Washington; the year was 1886 and the pump was steam operated. Failure of the main pump brought the designing engineers from the East, who were unable to find the difficulty. A Seattle engineer, James M. Colman, went to work and 36 hours (non-stop) later he had the pump back in service. This pump station worked "to heartbreak" during the Great Seattle Fire in 1889.

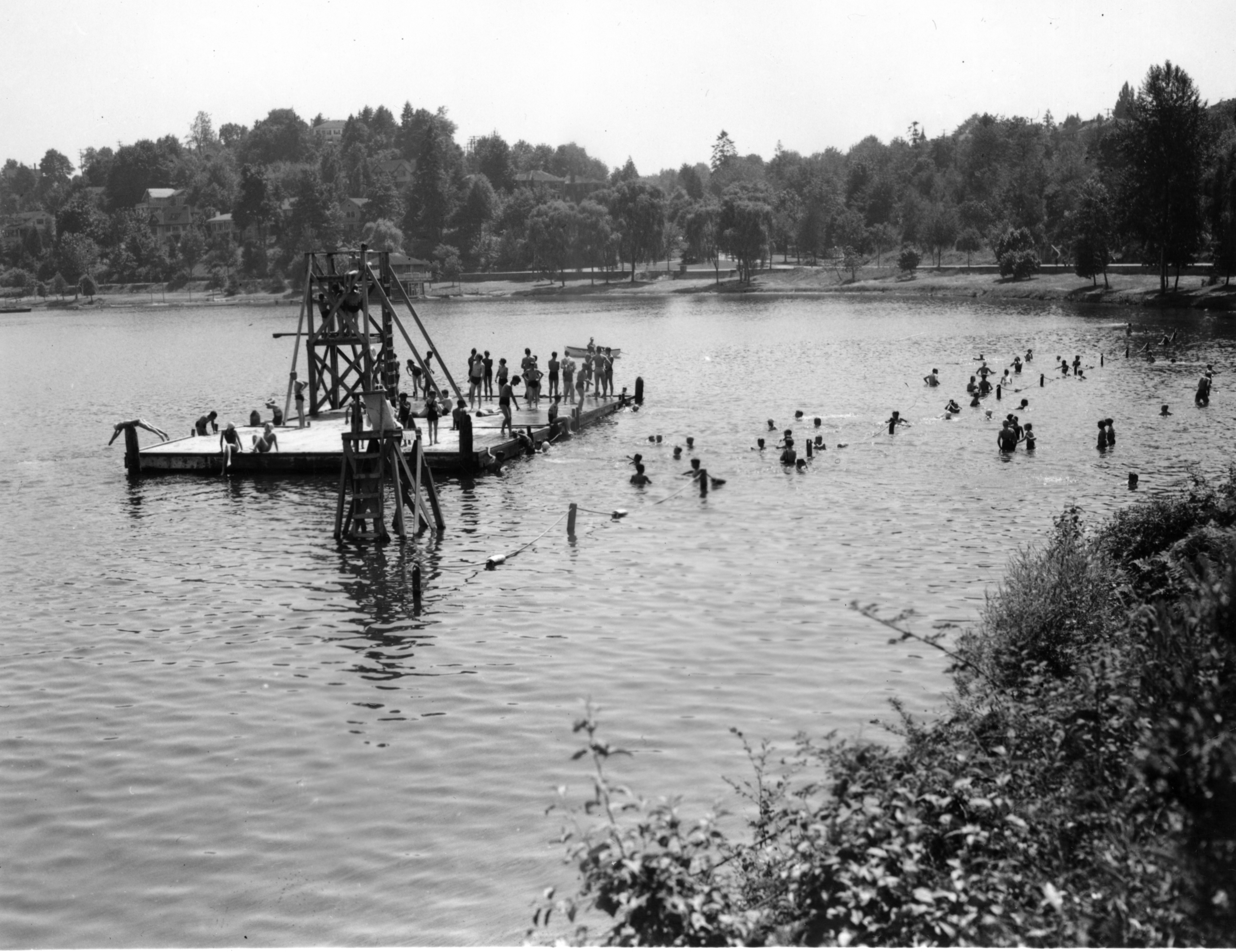
Swimming in Lake Washington at Colman Park, Seattle, Washington, U.S. in 1950.

In 1907, the Park Board was given jurisdiction of the plant site plus part of the pipeline right-of-way up the hill. Following the route chosen by the Olmsted Brothers, Frink Boulevard was extended southward curving down the slope, joining Lake Washington Boulevard, coming up from the south along the lakeshore. Additional gifts plus the purchase of property along the north side widened the park, and in 1909 the State granted the shorelands for park purposes. In 1910 the James M. Colman Estate filed a plat in which the "head" of the slope was deeded for park purposes and the "strip" from 31st down to the lake was named to the memory of Mr. Colman

In August 2002, Joseph Jerome Farris, a Senior Judge on the United States Court of Appeals for the Ninth Circuit, had 120 mature bigleaf maple and indigenous cherry trees in Colman Park cut down to improve the view of Lake Washington from his house. Some of the trees were more than forty years old and over fifty-five feet tall. Norm Maleng, the King County Prosecuting Attorney, declined to file felony malicious mischief charges. The Seattle City Attorney fined Judge Farris $500,000.

After Judge Farris did not pay the fine on time the city placed a lien on his 8,000 square-foot Mount Baker house. The federal judge maintained the trees were cut down due to a miscommunication with his Vietnamese gardener, which the gardener denied. A jury heard testimony from the gardener when Judge Farris sued his homeowner's insurer for coverage of the fine. Believing the gardener, the jury found against Judge Farris. Judge Farris finally paid the full fine amount, now with interest $618,000, in May 2006.
