= 1900 Washington gubernatorial election =

- November 6, 1900
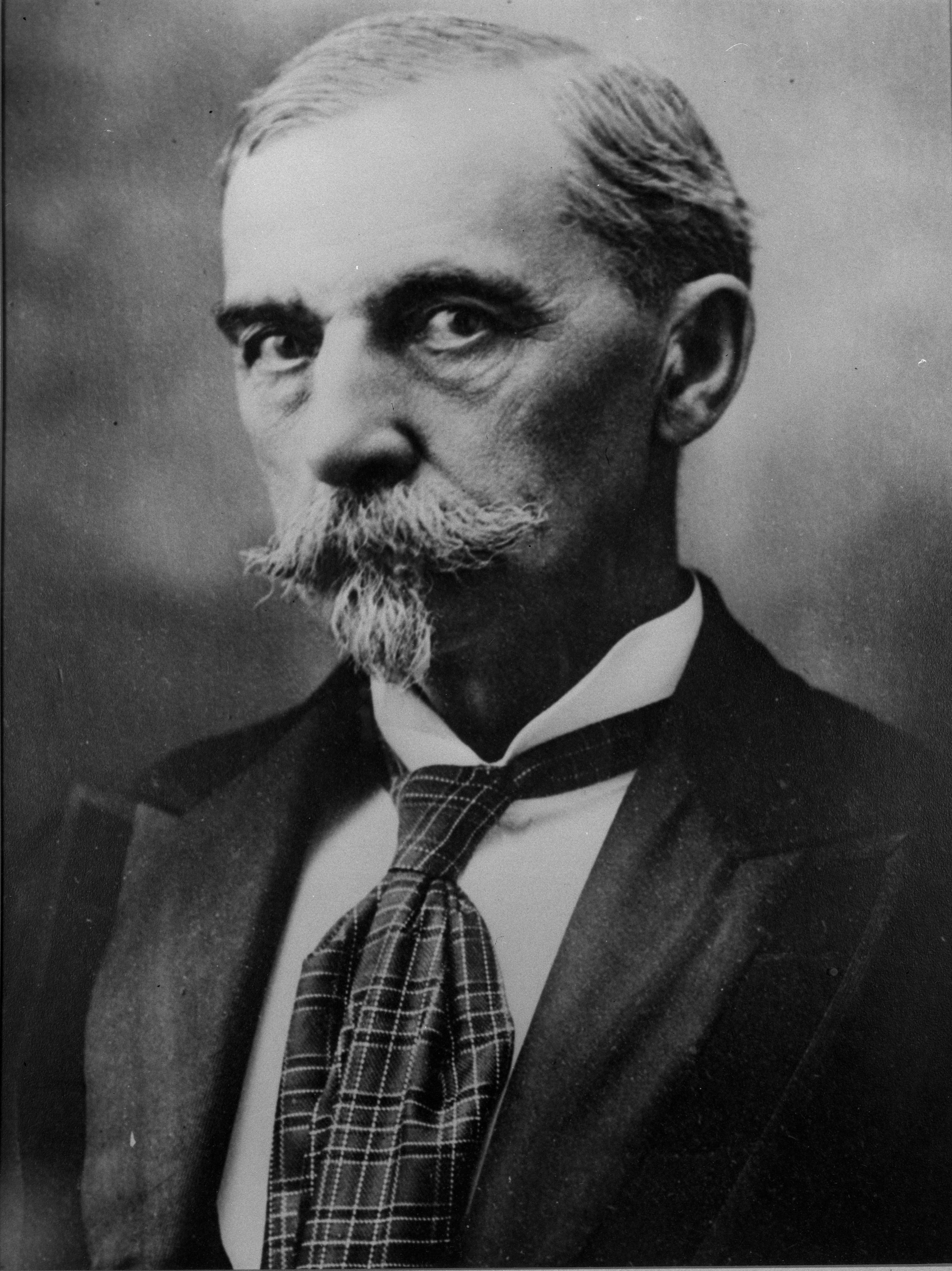

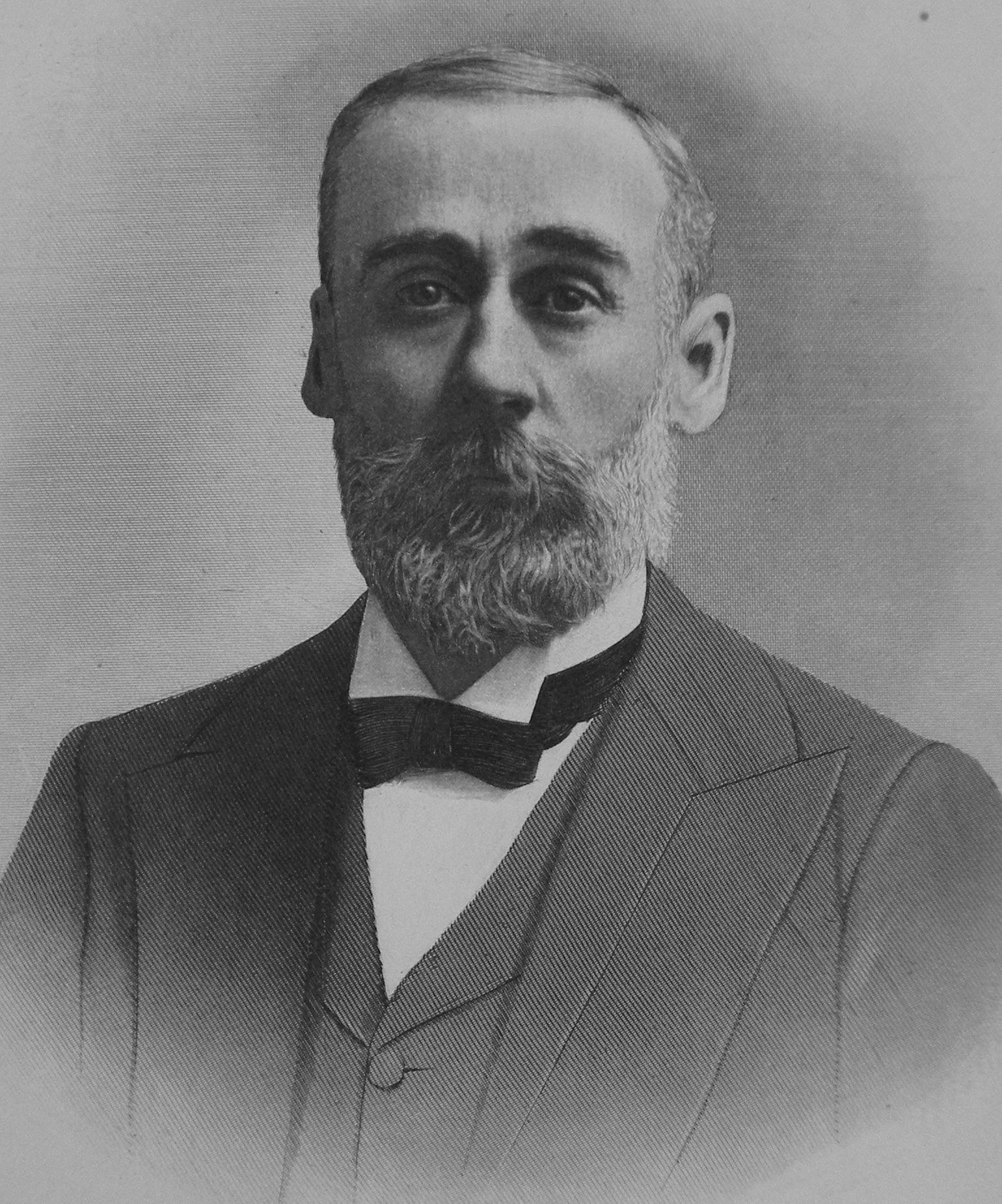
Nominee	John Rankin Rogers	John M. Frink
Party	Democratic	Republican
Alliance	Populist; Silver Republican
Popular vote	52,048	49,860
Percentage	48.86%	46.81%
- County results Rogers: 40–50% 50–60% 60–70% 70–80% Frink: 40–50% 50–60% 60–70%
Governor before election
John Rankin Rogers
Populist
Elected Governor
John Rankin Rogers
Democratic

The 1900 Washington gubernatorial election was held on November 6, 1900.

Incumbent Governor John Rankin Rogers won re-election as the Democratic nominee. He defeated Republican nominee John M. Frink with 48.86% of the vote.

In 1896, Rogers was the fusion candidate of the Democratic, Populist and Silver Republican parties. In 1900, he was nominated by a unity convention which merged the three parties in the state and took the name of the Democratic Party.

== General election ==
=== Candidates ===
Major party candidates

- John M. Frink, Republican, former State Senator
- John Rankin Rogers, Democratic, incumbent Governor

Other candidates

- Robert E. Dunlap, Prohibition, Prohibition nominee for Governor in 1896
- William C.B. Randolph, Social Democrat, carpenter
- William McCormick, Socialist Labor

=== Results ===
1900 Washington gubernatorial election
Party	Candidate	Votes	%	±%
Democratic	John Rankin Rogers (incumbent)	52,048	48.86%	−6.69%
Republican	John M. Frink	49,860	46.81%	+5.13%
Prohibition	Robert E. Dunlap	2,103	1.97%	−0.80%
Social Democratic	William C. B. Randolph	1,670	1.57%	
Socialist Labor	William McCormick	843	0.79%	
Majority		2,188	2.05%	
Total votes		106,524	100.00%	
Democratic hold		Swing	-11.81%	

=== Results by county ===
County	John R. Rogers Democratic		John M. Frink Republican		Robert E. Dunlap Prohibition		William C. B. Randolph Social Democratic		William McCormick Socialist Labor		Margin		Total votes cast
County	#	%	#	%	#	%	#	%	#	%	#	%	Total votes cast
Adams	597	58.88%	383	37.77%	25	2.47%	6	0.59%	3	0.30%	214	21.10%	1,014
Asotin	363	48.92%	350	47.17%	22	2.96%	6	0.81%	1	0.13%	13	1.75%	742
Chehalis	1,284	41.02%	1,648	52.65%	71	2.27%	103	3.29%	24	0.77%	-364	-11.63%	3,130
Chelan	652	55.73%	485	41.45%	17	1.45%	11	0.94%	5	0.43%	167	14.27%	1,170
Clallam	509	42.95%	622	52.49%	7	0.59%	40	3.38%	7	0.59%	-113	-9.54%	1,185
Clark	1,168	40.84%	1,517	53.04%	81	2.83%	73	2.55%	21	0.73%	-349	-12.20%	2,860
Columbia	760	46.54%	835	51.13%	25	1.53%	7	0.43%	6	0.37%	-75	-4.59%	1,633
Cowlitz	681	37.09%	1,104	60.13%	34 (Note: The Secretary of State's data dashboard gives this figure as 31, but this causes Dunlap's county figures to not add up to the stated total. The digitized version of the 1900 abstract of votes is of below average quality and some numbers are cut off. For scans of older printed documents, it is very easy to mistake 4s for 1s if the scan is of low quality. The actual figure being 34 is backed up by newspaper reports from late November 1900.)	1.85%	13	0.71%	7	0.38%	-423	-23.04%	1,839
Douglas	673	58.83%	444	38.81%	19	1.66%	7	0.61%	1	0.09%	229	20.02%	1,144
Ferry	894	70.56%	350	27.62%	10	0.79%	8	0.63%	5	0.39%	544	42.94%	1,267
Franklin	90	66.67%	39	28.89%	3	2.22%	0	0.00%	3	2.22%	51	37.78%	135
Garfield	501	50.71%	452	45.75%	10	1.01%	19	1.92%	6	0.61%	49	4.96%	988
Island	157	37.56%	240	57.42%	7	1.67%	10	2.39%	4	0.96%	-83	-19.86%	418
Jefferson	482	43.66%	599	54.26%	14	1.27%	4	0.36%	5	0.45%	-117	-10.60%	1,104
King	9,178	49.05%	8,801	47.03%	268	1.43%	243	1.30%	223	1.19%	377	2.01%	18,713
Kitsap	565	38.07%	807	54.38%	61	4.11%	37	2.49%	14	0.94%	-242	-16.31%	1,484
Kittitas	1,125	52.87%	946	44.45%	34	1.60%	13	0.61%	10	0.47%	179	8.41%	2,128
Klickitat	544	37.16%	850	58.06%	52	3.55%	12	0.82%	6	0.41%	-306	-20.90%	1,464
Lewis	1,546	45.10%	1,762	51.40%	77	2.25%	32	0.93%	11	0.32%	-216	-6.30%	3,428
Lincoln	1,851	60.18%	1,130	36.74%	62	2.02%	27	0.88%	6	0.20%	721	23.44%	3,076
Mason	476	48.32%	483	49.04%	8	0.81%	10	1.02%	8	0.81%	-7	-0.71%	985
Okanogan	730	62.34%	412	35.18%	13	1.11%	12	1.02%	4	0.34%	318	27.16%	1,171
Pacific	488	37.34%	787	60.21%	16	1.22%	9	0.69%	7	0.54%	-299	-22.88%	1,307
Pierce	5,153	49.70%	4,734	45.66%	139	1.34%	235	2.27%	108	1.04%	419	4.04%	10,369
San Juan	260	37.57%	410	59.25%	9	1.30%	6	0.87%	7	1.01%	-150	-21.68%	692
Skagit	1,434	44.15%	1,611	49.60%	64	1.97%	115	3.54%	24	0.74%	-177	-5.45%	3,248
Skamania	202	53.44%	165	43.65%	4	1.06%	2	0.53%	5	1.32%	37	9.79%	378
Snohomish	2,875	50.33%	2,609	45.68%	158	2.77%	49	0.86%	21	0.37%	266	4.66%	5,712
Spokane	5,955	54.19%	4,613	41.98%	309	2.81%	64	0.58%	48	0.44%	1,342	12.21%	10,989
Stevens	1,743	62.43%	987	35.35%	29	1.04%	23	0.82%	10	0.36%	756	27.08%	2,792
Thurston	895	37.99%	1,347	57.17%	51	2.16%	48	2.04%	15	0.64%	-452	-19.19%	2,356
Wahkiakum	236	37.94%	355	57.07%	8	1.29%	15	2.41%	8	1.29%	-119	-19.13%	622
Walla Walla	1,676	45.75%	1,907	52.06%	55	1.50%	14	0.38%	11	0.30%	-231	-6.31%	3,663
Whatcom	1,982	38.67%	2,652	51.74%	133	2.59%	231	4.51%	128	2.50%	-670	-13.07%	5,126
Whitman	3,123	56.58%	2,060	37.32%	168	3.04%	111	2.01%	58	1.05%	1,063	19.26%	5,520
Yakima	1,200	44.91%	1,364	51.05%	40	1.50%	55	2.06%	13	0.49%	-164	-6.14%	2,672
Totals	52,048	48.86%	49,860	46.81%	2,103	1.97%	1,670	1.57%	843	0.79%	2,188	2.05%	106,524

==== Counties that flipped from Populist to Republican ====
- Chehalis
- Clallam
- Clark
- Columbia
- Kitsap
- Lewis
- Mason
- Skagit
- Thurston
- Wahkiakum
- Walla Walla
- Whatcom
- Yakima

== Bibliography ==
- Glashan, Roy R. (1979). American Governors and Gubernatorial Elections, 1775-1978. Meckler Books. ISBN 0-930466-17-9.
- Gubernatorial Elections, 1787-1997. Washington, D.C.: Congressional Quarterly Inc. 1998. ISBN 1-56802-396-0.
