= Mount Baker, Seattle =

Coordinates: 47°35′00″N 122°17′30″W

Mount Baker
- Seattle Neighborhood
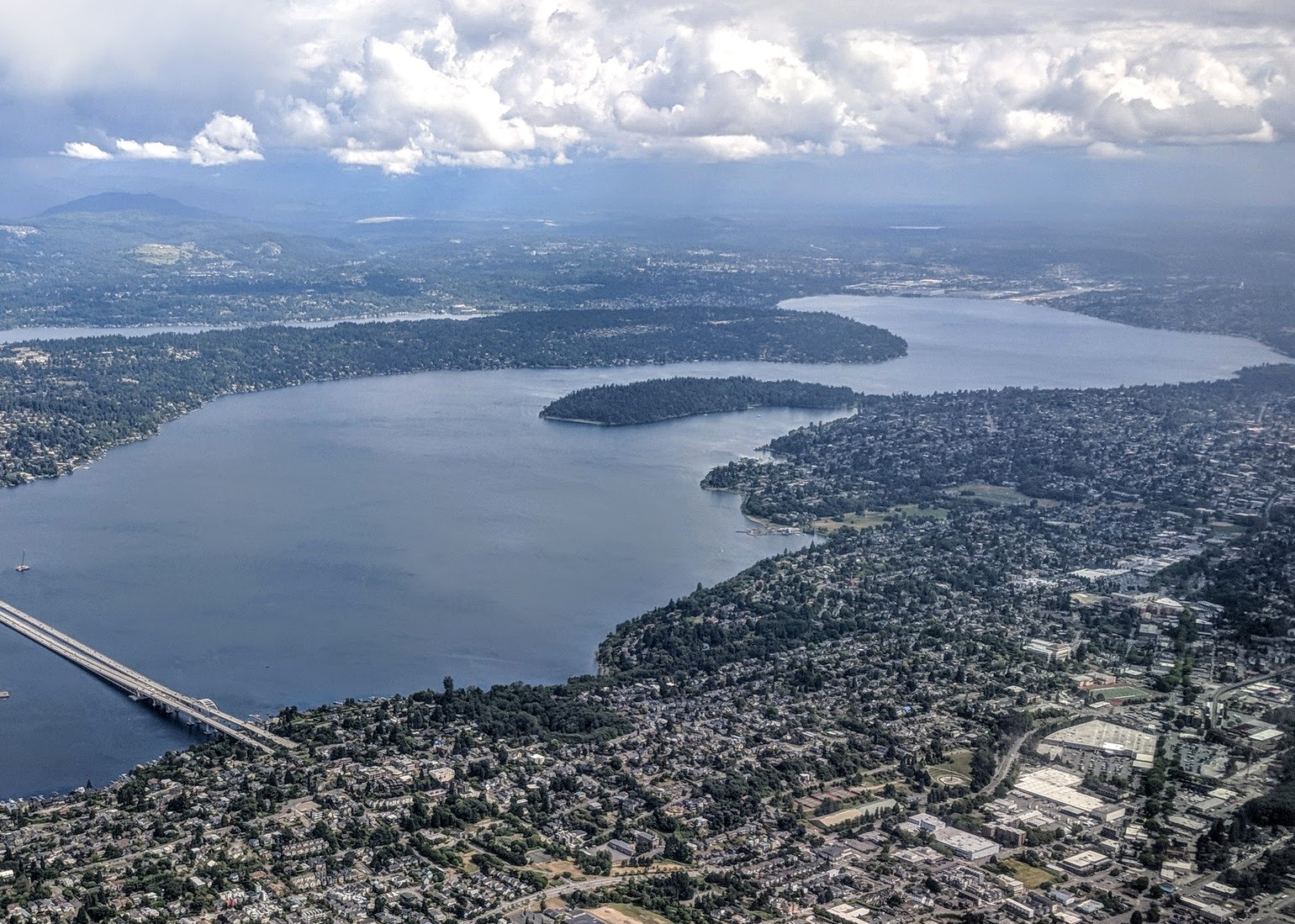
- Mount Baker neighborhood, aerial from the northwest

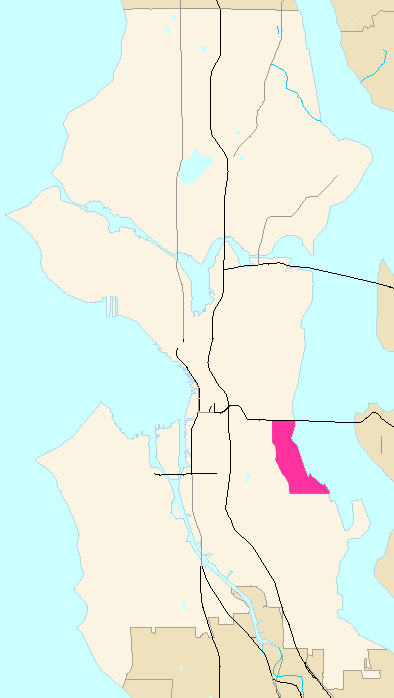
- Map of Mount Baker's location in Seattle
- Country: United States
- State: Washington
- City: Seattle
- City Council: District 3 and District 2
- Neighborhood Council: Southeast District
- Police District: South Precinct R2
- ZIP code: 98144, 98118

Mount Baker is a neighborhood in southeastern Seattle, Washington. The neighborhood's name comes from the view of Mount Baker in Whatcom County, that is seen by looking north over Lake Washington. It is bounded by Lake Washington to the east, Interstate 90 and then Leschi to the north, Rainier Valley to the west, and Columbia City to the south. The neighborhood has a community club and a rowing team. It hosts Seattle's annual Seafair, which includes an airshow featuring the U.S. Navy Blue Angels, hydroplane races, a fireworks show, and other festivities. Franklin High School and Garfield High School serve this area. It is part of Seattle's South End.

== Mount Baker Community Club ==
The Mount Baker Community Club is a volunteer non-profit neighborhood association located next to Mount Baker Park. The organization hosts community and private events at the Mount Baker Community Clubhouse, as well as park and open space stewardship programs around the Mount Baker neighborhood. In addition, the organization publishes a newsletter to support members with community news, events and historical interest stories.

== Places of worship ==
In 2021, Our Lady of Mount Virgin was named as one of three Catholic churches facing closure in a reorganisation plan by the Archdiocese of Seattle.

== Schools and parks ==
Seattle Public Schools

- John Muir Elementary School
- Hawthorne Elementary School
- Franklin High School
- Garfield High School

Seattle Parks & Recreations parks, dog parks and open spaces

- Blue Dog Pond
- Bradner Gardens Park
- Colman Park
- Mt. Baker Beach
- Mount Baker Boulevard
- Mount Baker Park
- Sam Smith Park
