= John M. Frink =

American politician (1855–1914)

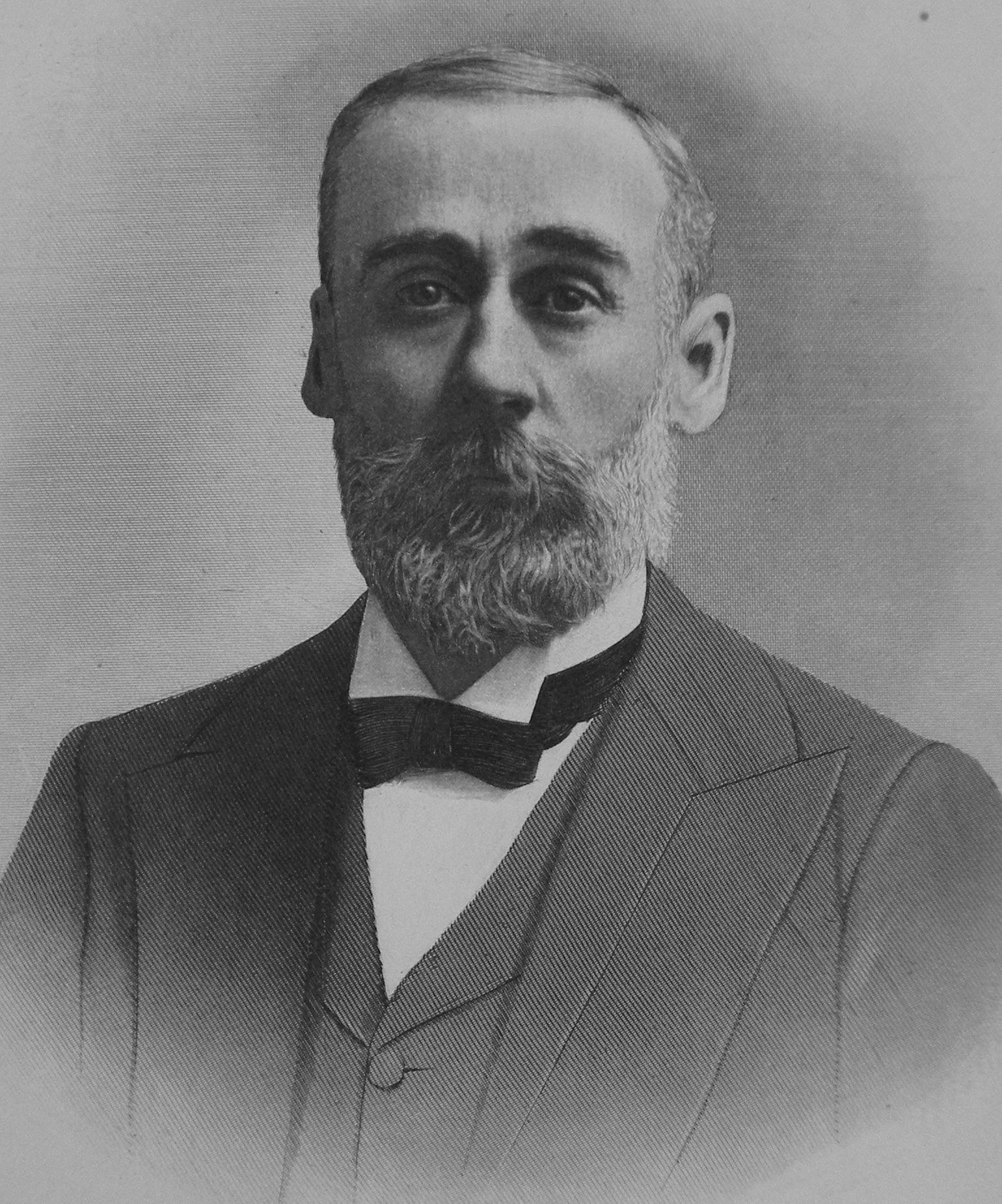
- Frink c. 1903

Member of the Washington State Senate from the 25th district
- In office 1891–1899
- Preceded by: office established
- Succeeded by: Andrew Hemrich

Personal details
- Born: John Melancthon Frink; January 21, 1855 Pennsylvania, USA
- Died: August 31, 1914 (aged 59) King County, Washington, USA
- Resting place: Lake View Cemetery
- Occupation: Politician, businessperson
- Known for: Frink Park, Seattle

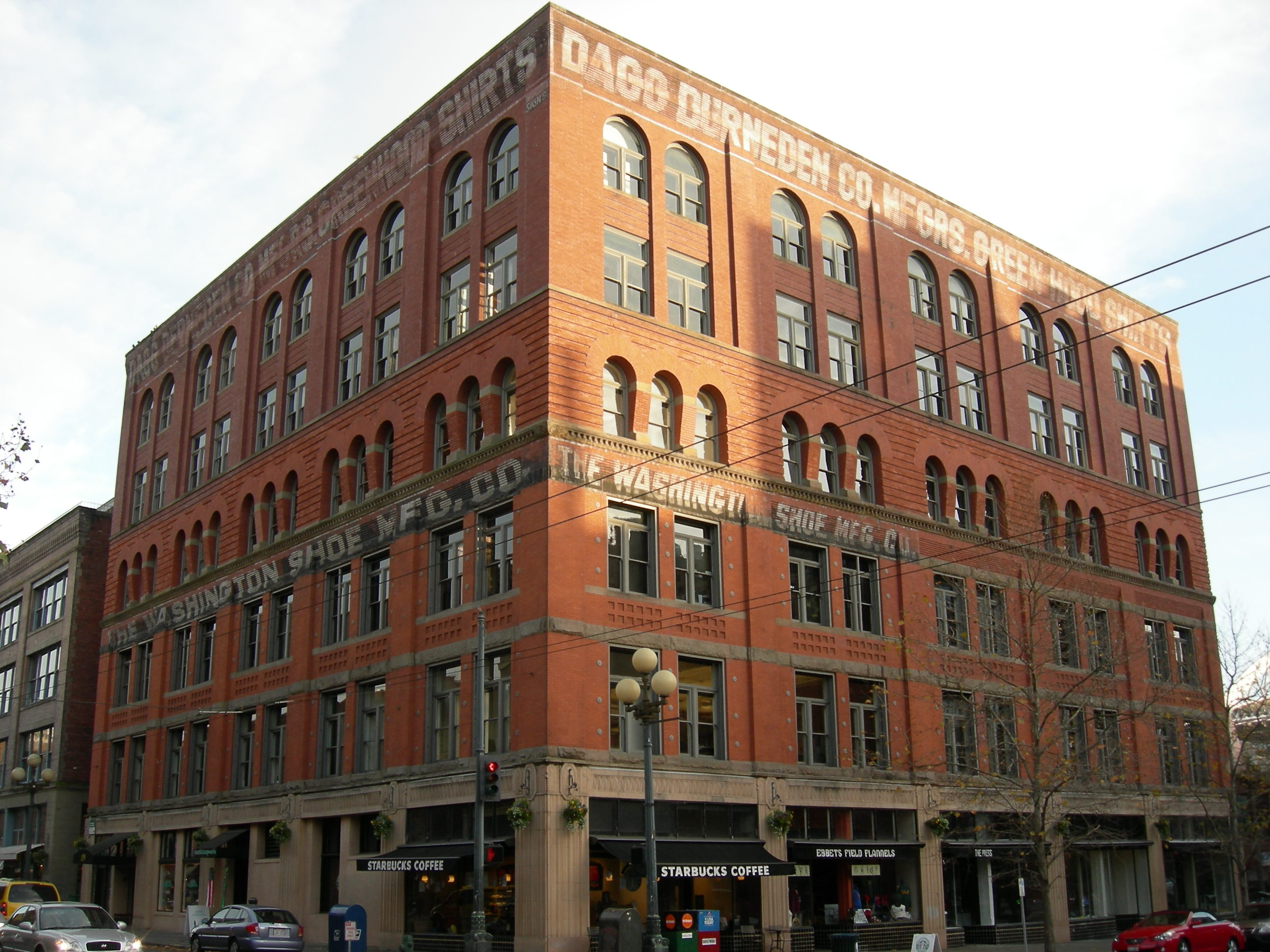
Washington Iron Works headquarters in Pioneer Square, Seattle; also called Frink Building and Washington Shoe Building

John Melancthon Frink (January 21, 1845 – August 31, 1914) was an early Washington state politician and businessperson.

Born in Pennsylvania in 1855, Frink attended Washington College in Topeka, and began a teaching career in Kansas. Arriving in Seattle in 1874, he both taught and served as principal at Seattle's Belltown School. Capitalizing on the city's growth, Frink formed a successful foundry business, Washington Iron Works. He later established the Seattle Electric Company, was a director of the Seattle Savings Bank, and served as a Washington State senator. He lost in the 1900 general election in a bid to unseat John Rankin Rogers as Governor of Washington State, running as a Republican.

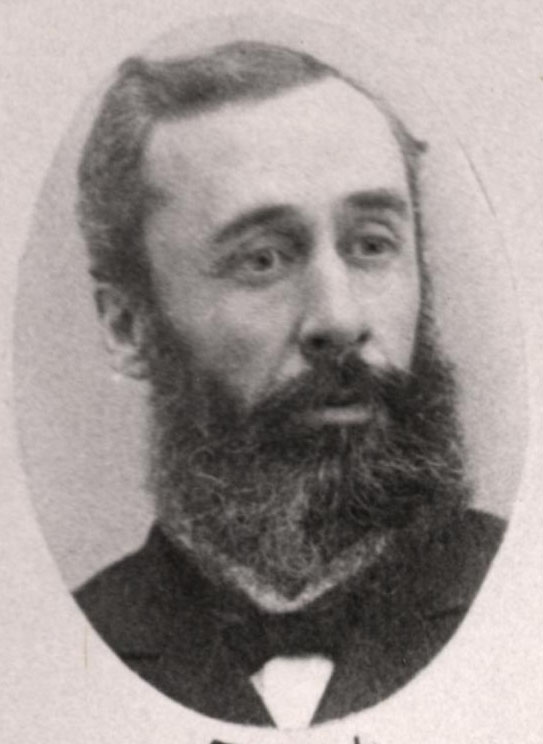
Frink in 1891

In 1906 Frink became a member of the Seattle Board of Park Commissioners, and later its president. In 1906 he donated the property that became Frink Park to the City of Seattle.

He died on August 31, 1914, and is buried in Lake View Cemetery, Seattle.

Party political offices
Preceded by Potter C. Sullivan	Republican nominee for Governor of Washington; 1900	Succeeded by Albert E. Mead
