= Seattle Municipal Archives =

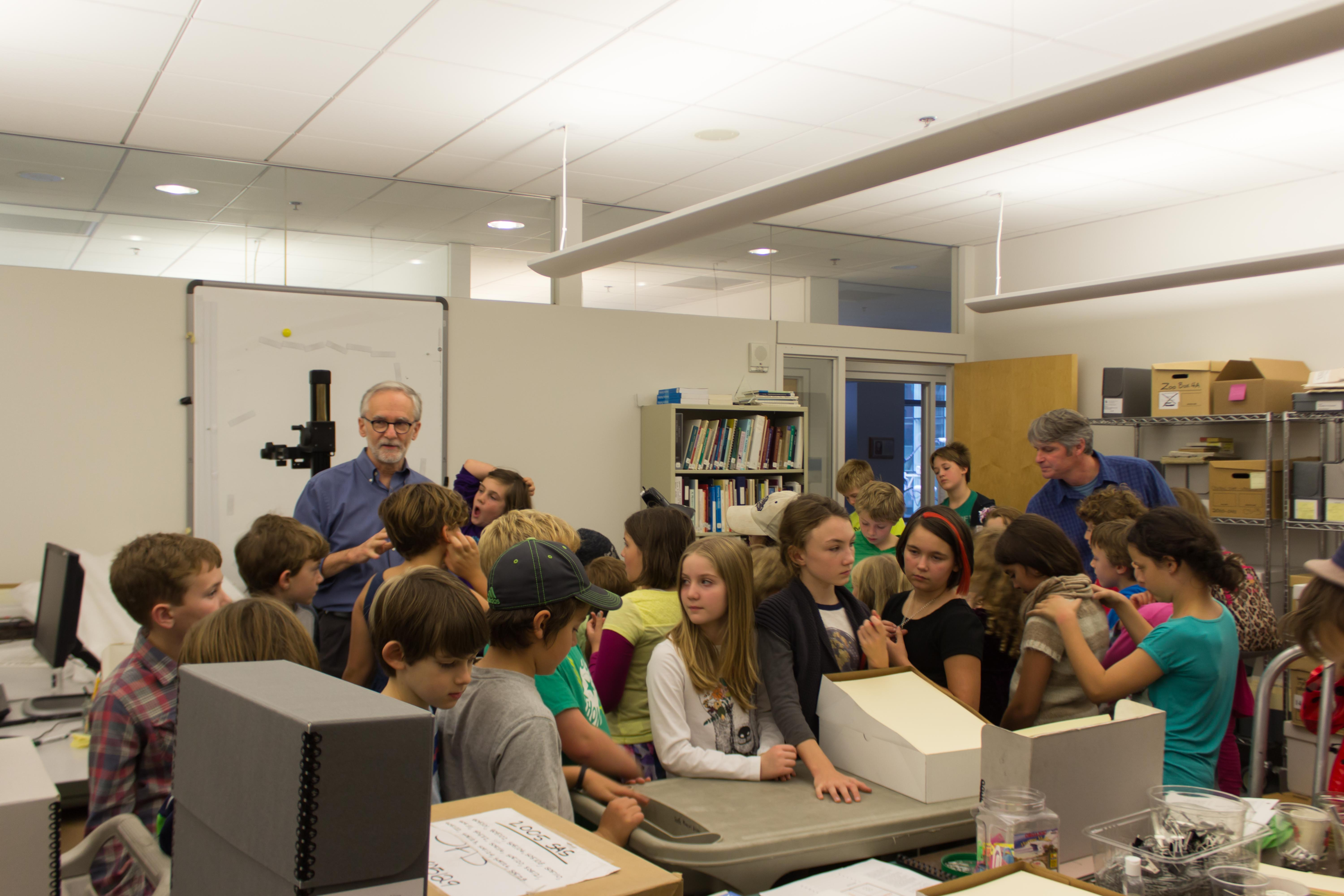
- Interactive map of Archives location
- 47.604045429243115°N 122.32985228257071°W
- Location: Seattle City Hall, Seattle, Washington, United States
- Established: 1985
- Website: www.seattle.gov/cityarchives/

The Seattle Municipal Archives are the official archive of the city of Seattle. The organization is housed in Seattle City Hall.

The organization was formally established in 1985. The city of Seattle stores its city records here.

The Seattle Municipal Archive accepted US$100,000 from the National Archives and Records Administration to process records.

By 2002 many of the archives photographs from before the 1930s had begun to deteriorate and the archival budget did not allow for all of them to be digitized to contemporary quality standards for archives. At this time, the archival collection had at least been scanned, but many of the pieces were low quality, and the decision was made to prioritize 3000 of the 1.5 million pieces in the collection for high quality digital preservation. Most of the archive's pictures from this time period were taken by city workers and document civil engineering.

From its founding until the present, Scott Cline has served as director of the archives. Cline studied history at Portland State University.
