= Seward Park (Seattle) =

Park in Seattle, Washington

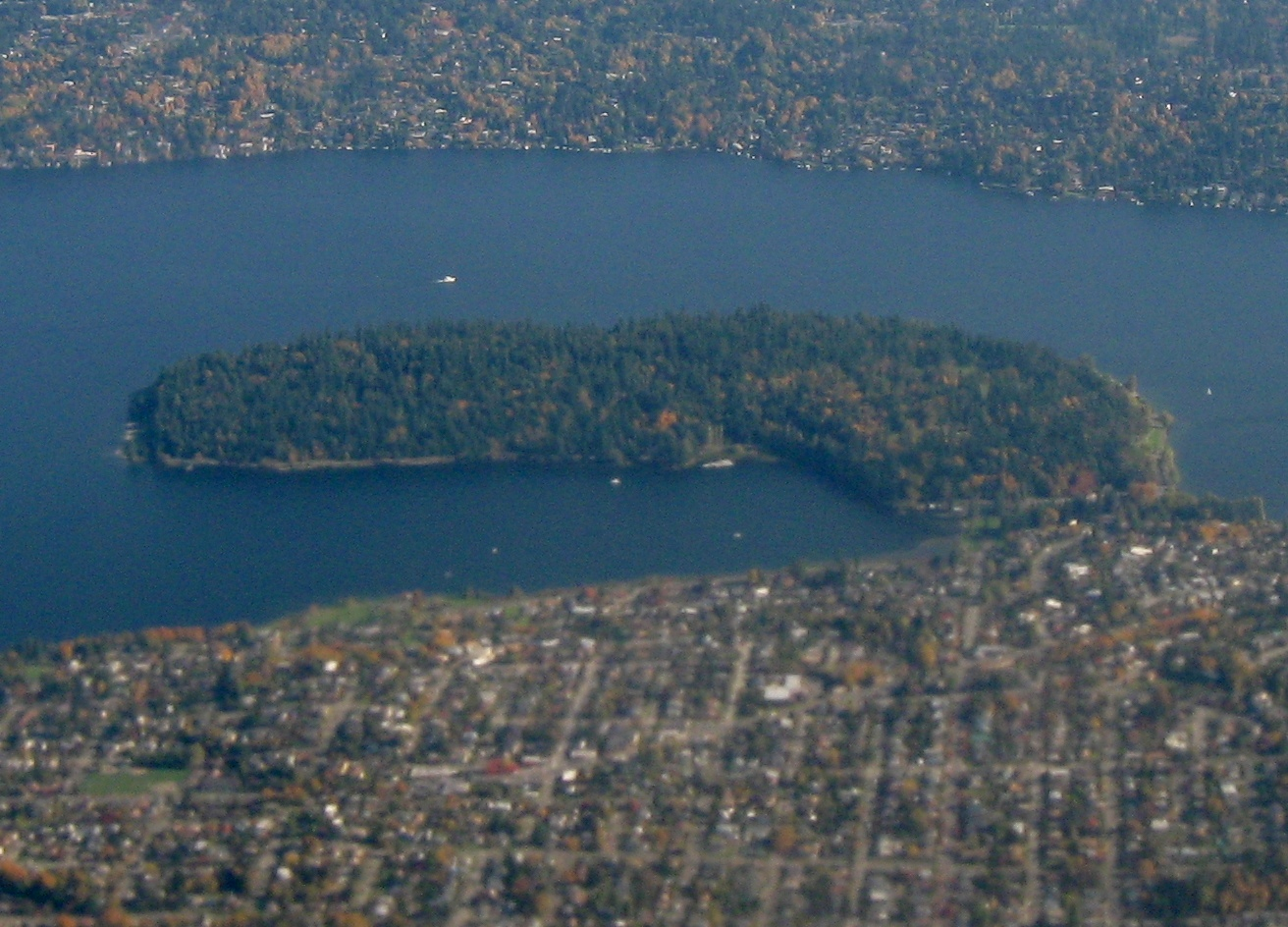
- Aerial view of Seward Park from the west, with Mercer Island on top and Seattle on bottom.
- Interactive map of Seward Park
- Type: Urban park
- Location: Seattle, Washington
- Coordinates: 47°33′18″N 122°15′00″W
- Area: 300 acres (120 ha; 0.47 sq mi)
- Established: 1911; 115 years ago
- Founder: E. O. Schwagerl
- Designer: Olmsted Brothers
- Operator: Seattle Parks and Recreation
- Open: 6 am – 10 pm
- Website: Seattle Parks and Recreation: Seward Park

Seward Park is a municipal park in Seattle, Washington, United States. Located in the city neighborhood of the same name, it covers 300 acres (120 ha; 0.47 sq mi). The park occupies all of Bailey Peninsula (Lushootseed: sqəbəqsəd), a forested peninsula that juts into Lake Washington. It contains one of the last surviving tracts of old-growth forest within the city of Seattle. The park is named after U.S. Secretary of State William Seward.

== Geography ==
The park is accessible from the north by Lake Washington Boulevard S, from the south by Seward Park Avenue S., and from the west by S Orcas Street. The main parking lot and a tennis court are located in the southwest corner. The most commonly used trail is a car-free loop around the park. It is flat and 2.4 mi (3.9 km) in length. The perimeter trail was repaved in 2007. Other trails run through the interior, including a few car-accessible roads that lead to amenities including an amphitheater and picnic area. Seward Park features numerous small beaches, the largest one on its southwest side, as well as a playground and an arts center.

The 300 acres (120 ha) of Seward Park have roughly 120 acres (49 ha) of surviving old growth forest, providing a glimpse of what some of the lake shore looked like before the city of Seattle was founded. With trees older than 250 years and many less than 200, the Seward Park forest is relatively young (the forests of Seattle before the city was fully mature were usually 1,000–2,000 years old).

== History ==
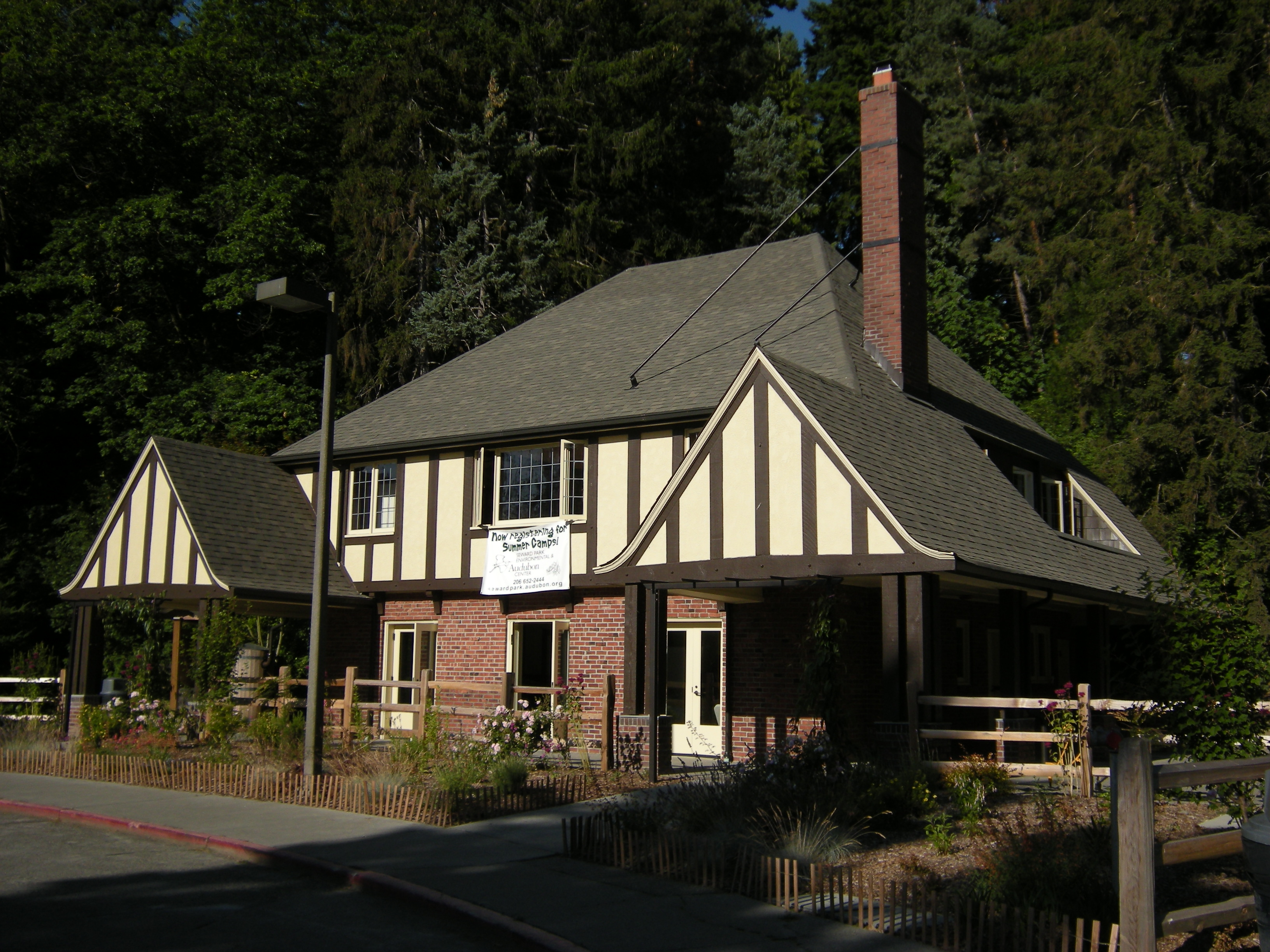
The Seward Park Inn, a Seattle city landmark.

The area has been inhabited since the end of the last glacial period (c. 8000 BCE—10,000 years ago). The x̌ačuʔabš (today a subgroup of the Duwamish people) traditionally conducted resource gathering in the area. The Lushootseed word for Bailey Peninsula is sqəbəqsəd, specifically referring to the rocky points, or "noses," at the north and south ends evident before the completion of the Lake Washington Ship Canal in 1916, which lowered the level of Lake Washington. The marshy isthmus connecting the peninsula to the mainland is called cqalapsəb, meaning "neck".

The purchase of the park was suggested as early as 1892, but was sidelined due to its distance from what was then the city. However, the Olmsted Brothers assimilated it into its plan for Seattle parks, and the city of Seattle bought Bailey Peninsula in 1911 for $322,000, and named the park after William H. Seward, former United States Secretary of State, who was known for negotiating the Alaska Purchase.

At the entrance to the park, in a wooded island filled with flowers between the circular entrance and exit road, there is a little-known monument: a taiko-gata stone lantern (tōrō), a gift of friendship from the City of Yokohama, Japan, which was given to the city in 1931 in gratitude to Seattle's assistance to Yokohama after the 1923 Great Kantō earthquake.

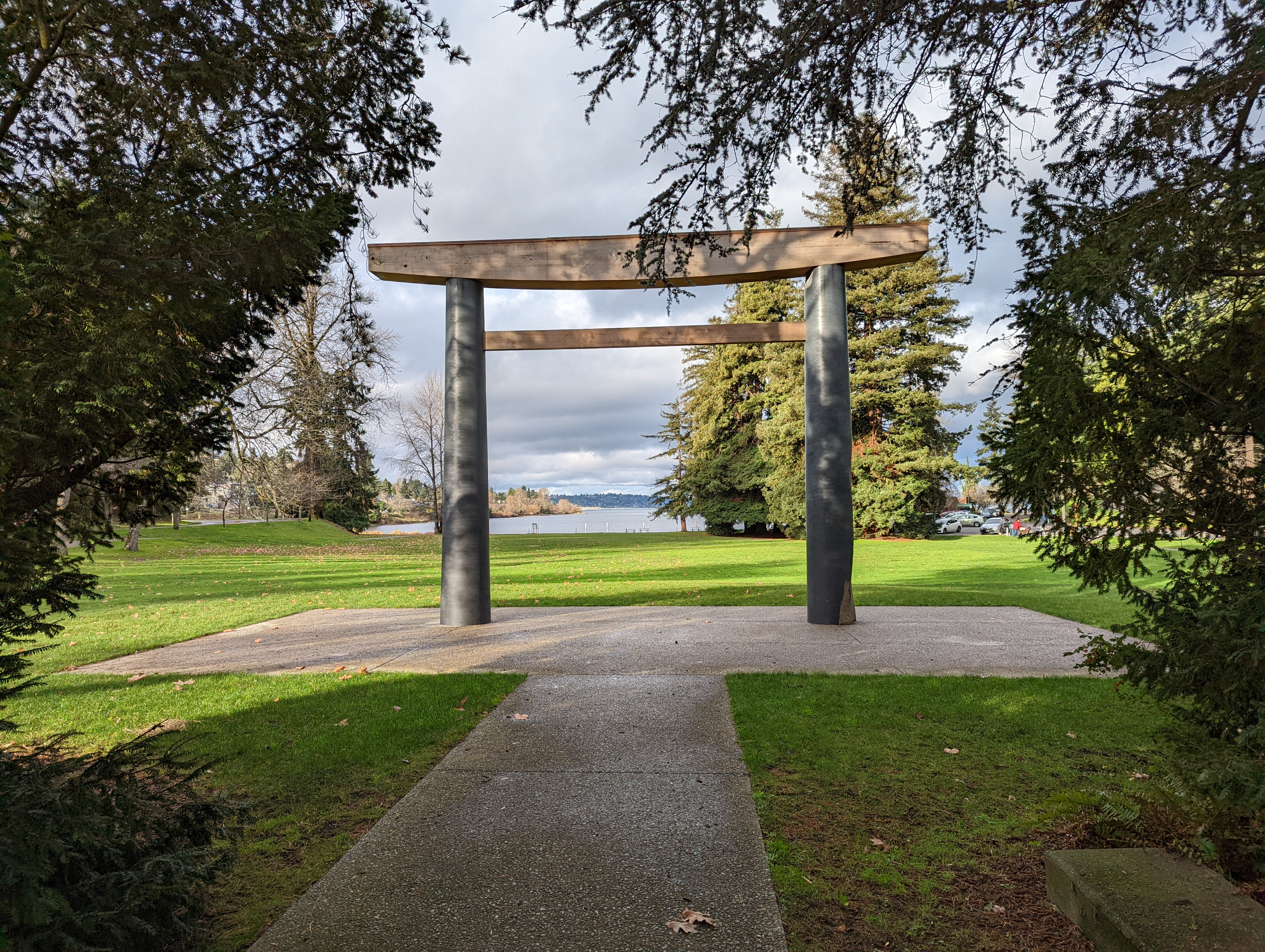
The Seward Park Torii in 2021.

Originally built for Seattle's Potlatch festival in 1934, a Japanese style wooden torii stood near the entrance to Seward Park from 1936 to the mid 1980s, when it was removed due to decay. It was designed by Kichio Allen Arai, the first Asian American architect in Seattle to be credited for his work. A replacement made with stone columns and timber cross beams was completed by early 2021 and formally dedicated in 2022.

Since at least July 2004, the park has become a home to wild rabbits and a growing colony of feral Peruvian conures (parrots, either the Chapman's mitred or the scarlet-fronted), who were released into the wild by their owners (or some escaped). They fly between Seward Park and Maple Leaf in northeast Seattle. The park is also home to two nesting pairs of bald eagles, who can frequently be seen flying over Lake Washington and diving to the water's surface to catch fish and ducks.

Renovation on the Tudor-style house at the entrance to Seward Park—originally the Seward Park Inn, a Seattle city landmark—was completed early in 2008. It is now home to the Seward Park Audubon Center. Programs at the Center and in the park include school, youth, community, arts in the environment, and special events. The Center also includes exhibits, an extensive library, a laboratory, and a small gift shop.

On April 22, 2022, President Joe Biden visited Seward Park and signed an executive order to create an inventory of "mature and old-growth trees" for conservation purposes.

== Description ==
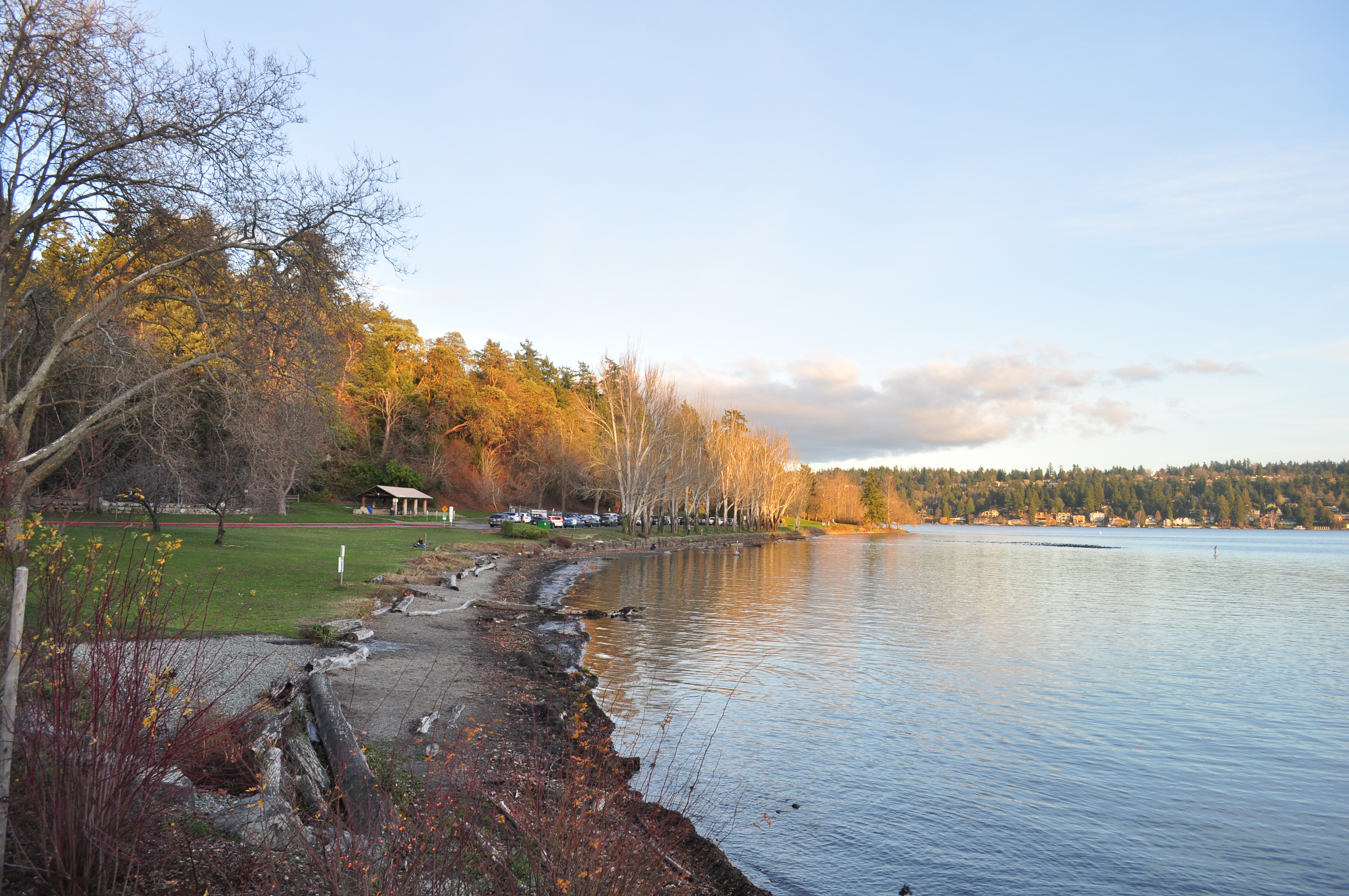
Southern shore boundary of Seward Park.

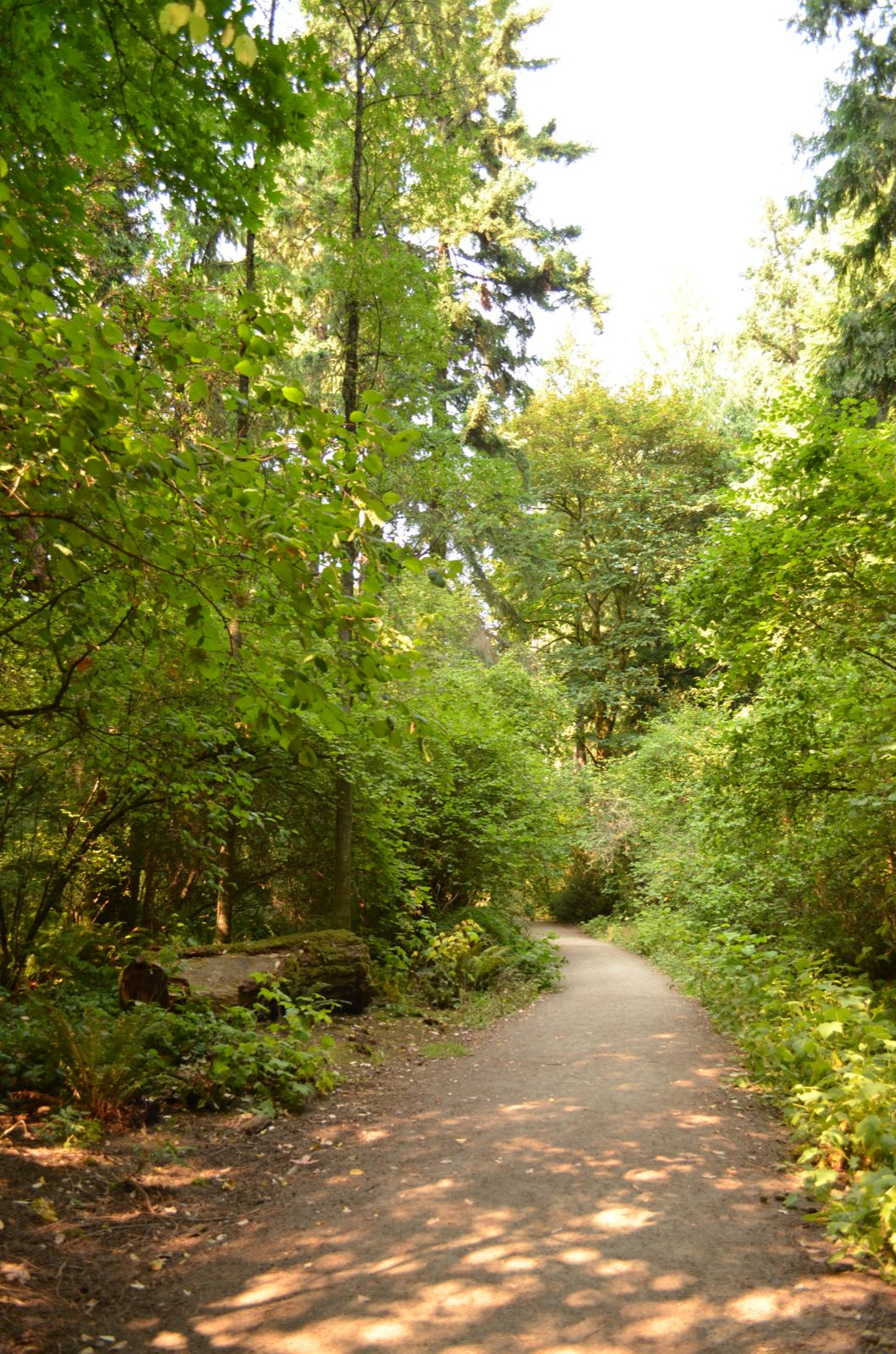
A forest trail in Seward Park.

Seward Park offers at least five distinct areas, including the beach on Andrews' Bay, which is flanked by a broad lawn and other facilities. It is one of several lakeshore beaches in Seattle's parks system.

On the other side of this beach is a playground, tennis courts, and several large parking lots. The parking lots often feature neighboring residents sometimes throw impromptu parties in this area of the park. The upper area of the park includes a large picnic area and an outdoor amphitheater, where civic events are held. The amphitheater also has views of the old-growth forest, which is bisected by a trail with granite markers.

The paved perimeter of the park is home to a multi-use path for walking, hiking, running, bicycling, and rollerblading. It includes views of Mount Rainier, Lake Washington, Mercer Island, and Leschi/Mount Baker Ridge, among other areas. To the west of the park are several rows of homes on a nameless ridge, sometimes referred to as "Graham Hill".

== See also ==
- Sites and works regarding William H. Seward

== Bibliography ==
- "Seward Park". Seattle Parks and Recreation. Archived from the original on February 1, 2000.
- "Seward Park History". Seattle Parks and Recreation. June 30, 2003. Archived from the original on January 14, 2003.
- Sherwood, Don (June 20, 2003). "Seward Park" (PDF). PARK HISTORY: Sherwood History Files. Seattle Parks and Recreation. Archived from the original on October 25, 2004.
- Talbert, Paul (May 1, 2006). "The Magnificent Forest". Friends of Seward Park. Archived from the original on July 17, 2006.
- Talbert, Paul (May 1, 2006). "SkEba'kst: The Lake People and Seward Park". The History of Seward Park. SewardPark.org. Archived from the original on December 14, 2005.

=== Further reading ===
- Friends of Seward Park
- "Seward Park", Seattle Parks and Recreation
- Seward Park Audubon Center
