= Denny-Blaine, Seattle =

Seattle neighborhood

Denny-Blaine, Seattle Harrison
- Seattle Neighborhood
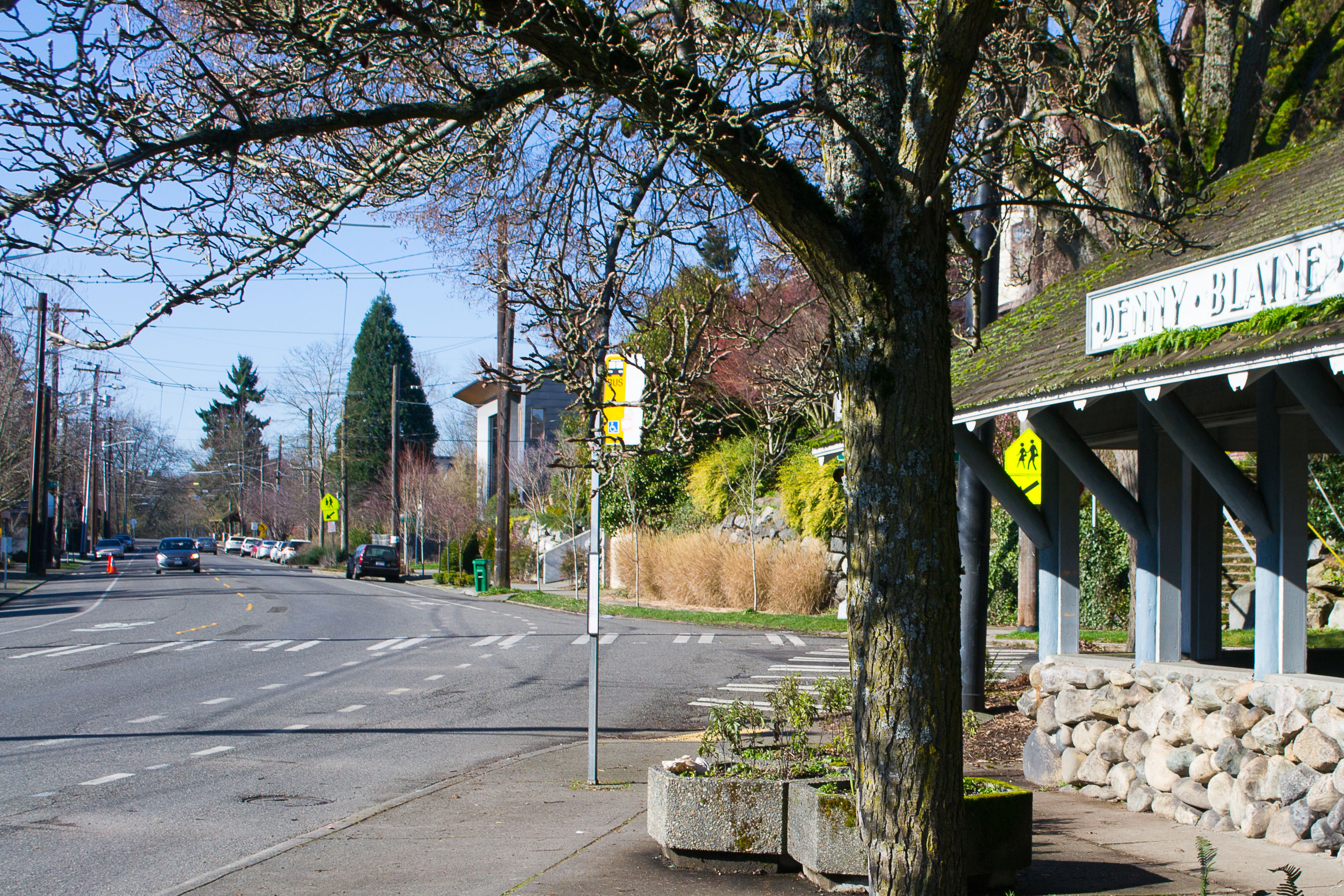
- A view of Madrona Place and East Denny Way in the Denny-Blaine neighborhood

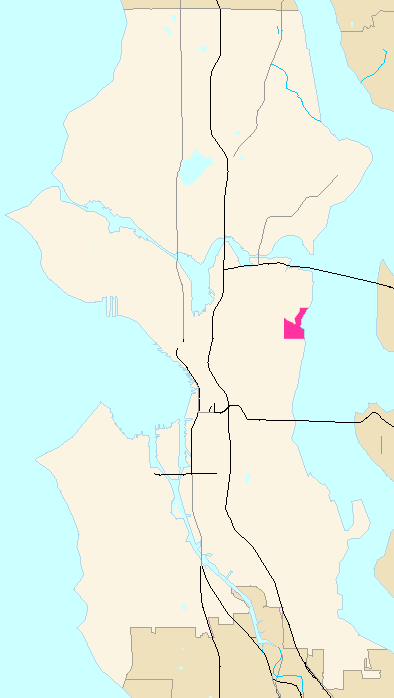
- Denny-Blaine Highlighted in Pink
- Coordinates: 47°37′17″N 122°17′11″W
- Country: United States
- State: Washington
- County: King
- City: Seattle
- Named for: Elbert F. Blaine; Charles L. Denny (son of Arthur A. Denny)
- ZIP Code: 98112
- Area code(s): 206, 564

Denny-Blaine (also known as Harrison) is a neighborhood in east central Seattle, Washington. It is bounded on the east by Lake Washington; on the south by E. Howell Street, beyond which is Madrona; on the west by 32nd Avenue, beyond which is Madison Valley; and on the north by Lake Washington Boulevard E., Hillside Drive E., and E. Prospect Street, beyond which are Washington Park and Madison Park.

The neighborhood's main thoroughfares are E. Denny Way and E. Harrison Street (east- and westbound) and Dorffel Drive E. and Lake Washington and McGilvra Boulevards E. (north- and southbound). Denny-Blaine Park is on the Lake Washington waterfront at the foot of E. Denny-Blaine Place.

The Denny-Blaine neighborhood is one of the most affluent and exclusive neighborhoods in Seattle.

== History ==
The neighborhood is named after its developers, Elbert F. Blaine and Charles L. Denny, who began subdividing the area in 1910. Denny was the son of Seattle pioneer Arthur Denny.

On April 8, 1994, Nirvana frontman Kurt Cobain was found dead at his home at 171 Lake Washington Blvd. E. The greenhouse in which he was found was later razed by his wife Courtney Love; the house and property were subsequently sold to a private party. A memorial to the iconic musician is located adjacent to the house in Viretta Park; numerous messages and dedications have been carved into wooden benches there.
