= Frink Park =

Park in Seattle, Washington, U.S.

Coordinates: 47.5993°N 122.2907°W

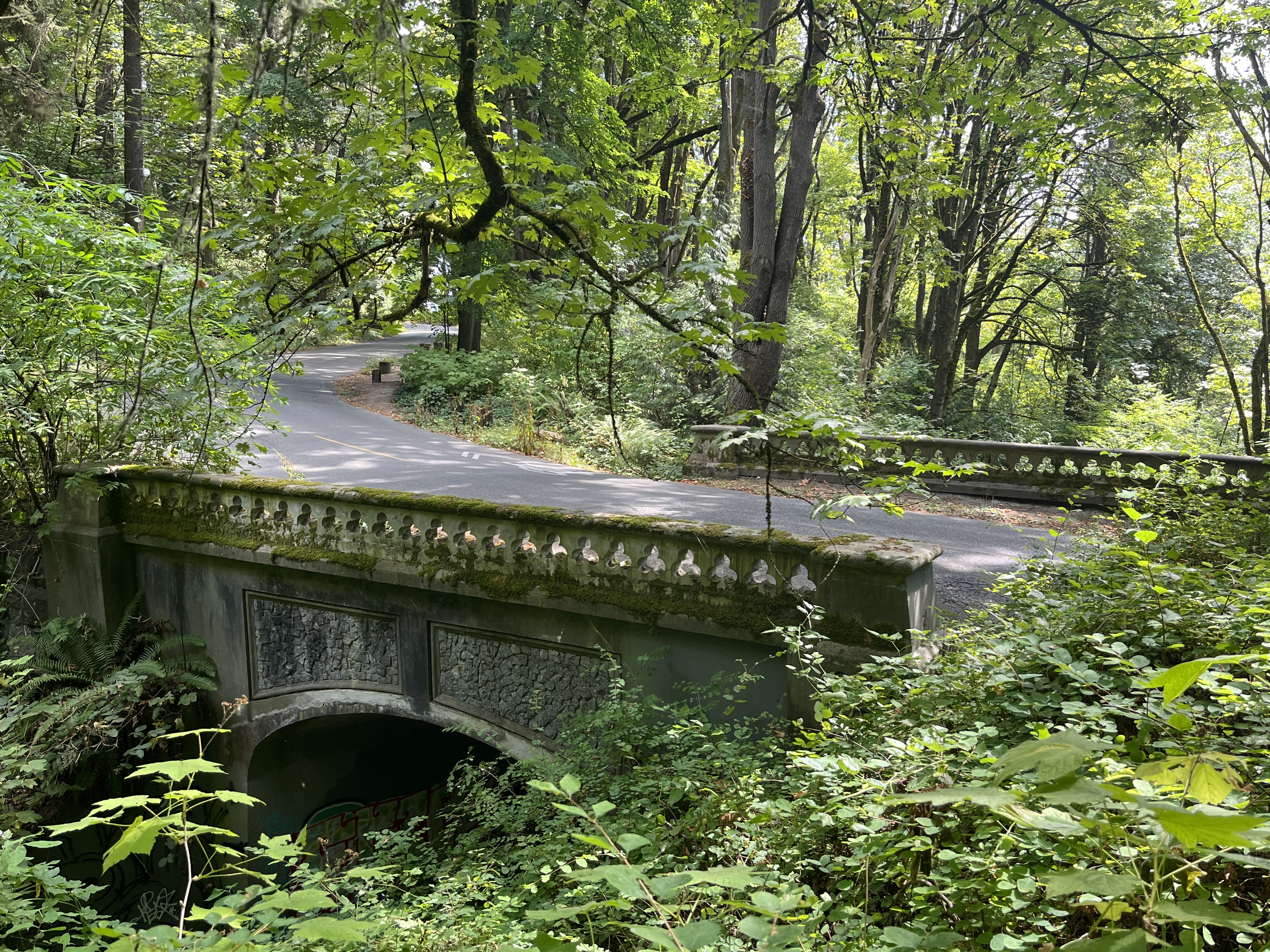
- Interactive map of Frink Park
- Location: Leschi, Seattle, Washington
- Area: 17.2 acres (7.0 ha)
- Created: 1906
- Website: www.seattle.gov/parks/allparks/frink-park
- Frink Park
- U.S. National Register of Historic Places
- NRHP reference No.: 100004646

Significant dates
- Added to NRHP: 2019
- Designated NRHP: 2019

Frink Park is a 17.2 acre (70,000 m^{2}) park in the Leschi neighborhood of Seattle, Washington. It is a heavily wooded hillside and ravine through which flows Frink Creek. Most of the park is bounded by 31st Avenue S. in the west, 34th Avenue S. in the east, and the rights-of-way of S. Main Street in the north and S. King Street in the south. Lake Washington Boulevard S. and S. Frink Place are recreational drives within the park.

Frink Park in 1911

Frink Park borders Leschi Park in its northwest corner.

== History ==
The land for the park was donated to the city in 1906 by parks commissioner John M. Frink. The John Charles Olmsted firm designed and planned the park. The wooded hillsides are steep and can be hazardous.

It was listed on the National Register of Historic Places in 2019.
