= Madrona Park (Seattle) =

Waterfront park in Seattle, Washington, United States

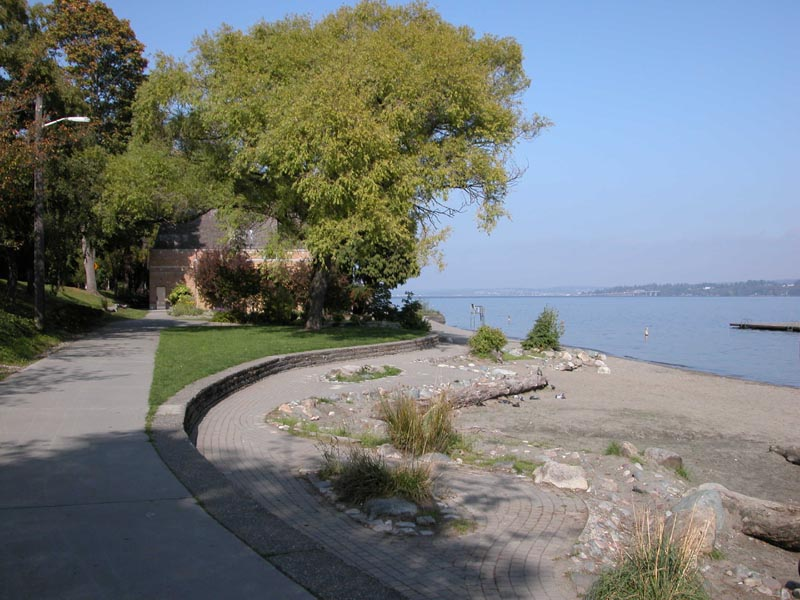
- Madrona Park in 2004
- Interactive map of Madrona Park
- Type: Urban Park
- Location: Seattle, Washington
- Coordinates: 47°36′36″N 122°17′01″W
- Area: 31.2 acres (126,000 m^{2})
- Operated by: Seattle Parks and Recreation

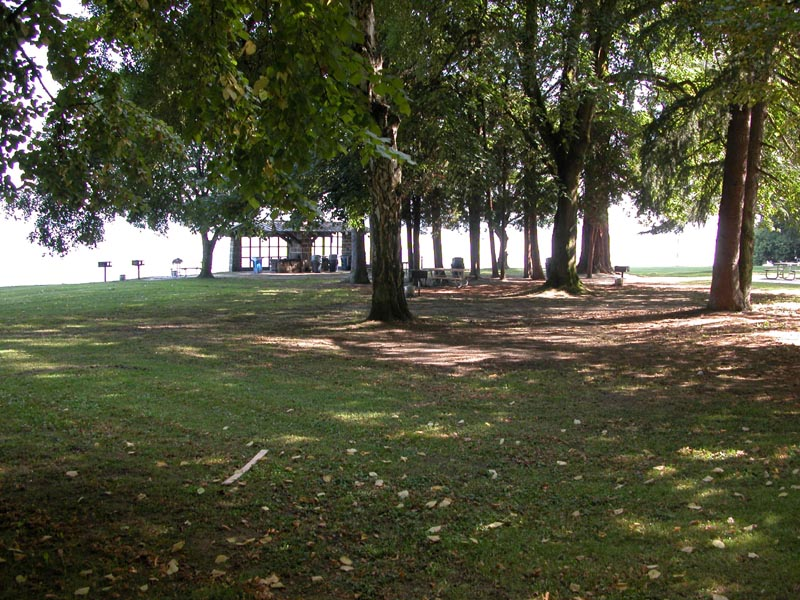
Madrona Park in 2004

Madrona Park is a 31.2-acre (126,000 m^{2}) park located in the Madrona neighborhood of Seattle, Washington, bisected by Lake Washington Boulevard. It lies on the western shore of Lake Washington and features picnic areas, a swimming beach with bathhouse, and parking area. West of the campground is a tree-covered hillside and ravine featuring walking paths and Madrona Creek.
