= Othello station =

Light rail station in Seattle, Washington

60 Othello
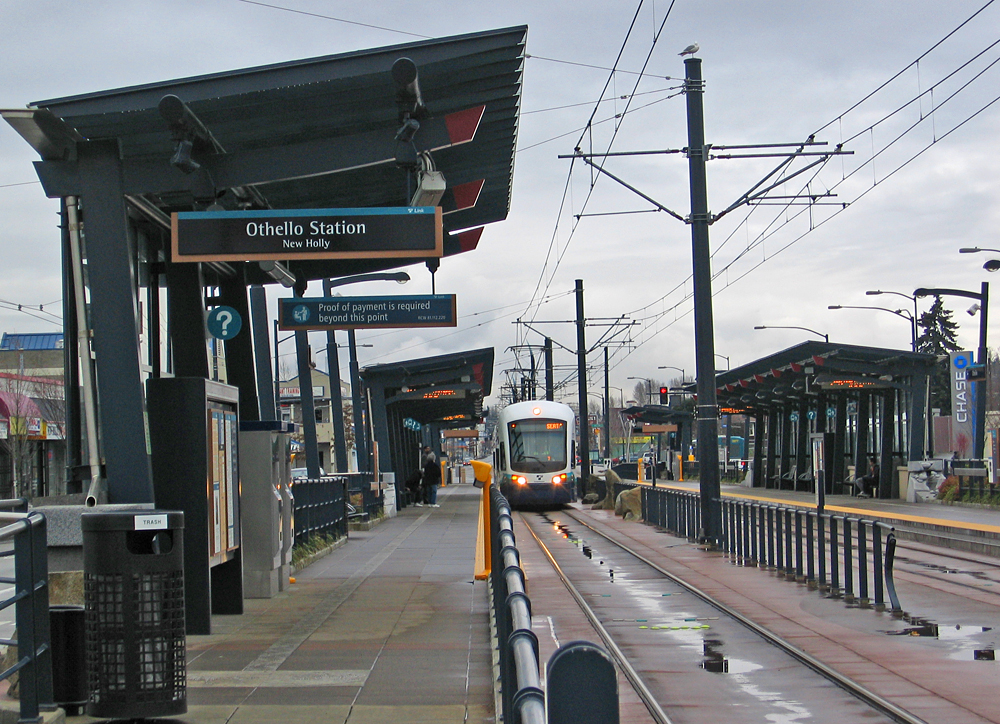
- A southbound Link train at Othello station

General information
- Location: 7100 Martin Luther King Jr. Way South; Seattle, Washington; United States
- Coordinates: 47°32′16.5″N 122°16′53.5″W
- System: Link light rail
- Owner: Sound Transit
- Platforms: 2 side platforms
- Tracks: 2
- Connections: King County Metro

Construction
- Structure type: At-grade
- Parking: Paid parking nearby
- Cycle facilities: Lockers
- Accessible: Yes

History
- Opened: July 18, 2009

Passengers
- 2,606 daily weekday boardings (2025); 885,286 total boardings (2025)

Services
Preceding station	Sound Transit	Following station
Link
Columbia City toward Lynnwood City Center	1 Line	Rainier Beach toward Federal Way Downtown
Location

Othello station is a light rail station located in Seattle, Washington. It is situated between the Rainier Beach and Columbia City stations on the 1 Line, part of the Link light rail system managed by Sound Transit. The station consists of two at-grade side platforms between South Othello Street and South Myrtle Street in the median of Martin Luther King Jr. Way South in the NewHolly neighborhood, part of Seattle's Rainier Valley.

The station opened on July 18, 2009. Trains serve the station twenty hours a day on most days; the headway between trains is eight minutes during peak periods, with less frequent service at other times. Othello station is also served by three King County Metro bus routes that connect it to Beacon Hill, Downtown Seattle, Mount Baker, Renton and West Seattle.

== Location ==
Othello station is located in the median of Martin Luther King Jr. Way between Othello and Myrtle streets in the NewHolly neighborhood of Seattle's Rainier Valley. It is at the center of the neighborhood's retail area, and is a short distance from a Seattle Public Library branch, the Othello Playground, and the Chief Sealth Trail. A Safeway grocery store is adjacent to the retail area on the west side of Othello station; it was originally slated to close but remained opened and received a remodel following the station's opening. The 7.4-acre (3.0 ha) Othello Playground is located a block east of the station on Othello Street in the Brighton neighborhood.

=== Transit-oriented development ===
The area surrounding the station consists primarily of single-family homes, with some multi-family housing and commercial areas along Martin Luther King Jr. Way. Within a 1/2-mile (0.80 km) radius of the station is a population of 7,901 residents, of which 87 percent are of a minority group, and 758 jobs. The Othello area developed with short blocks and neighborhood-level retail, creating what the Puget Sound Regional Council called a "moderately walkable" environment.

The construction of transit-oriented development around Othello station began before the beginning of light rail service. In the early 2000s, the Seattle Housing Authority redeveloped its Holly Park public housing area into a mixed-income neighborhood of townhomes and apartments called "NewHolly". The new, 1,450-unit development opened in 2005. The Great Recession of the late 2000s delayed plans to redevelop strip malls and unused land near Othello station, cancelling several attempts by local businesses to sell properties to real estate developers.

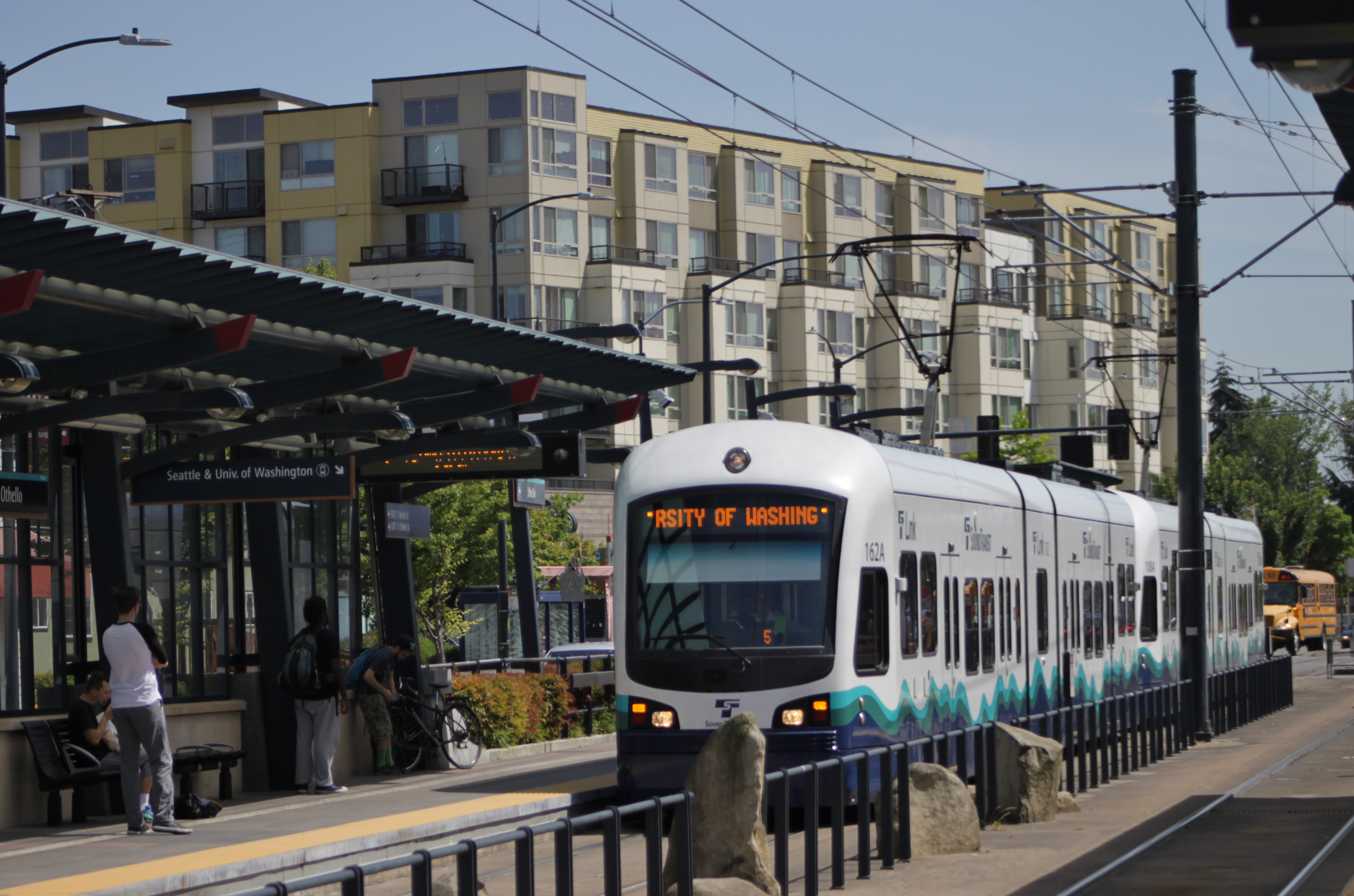
The Station at Othello Park, a 351-unit apartment building, is adjacent to Othello station

The first major market rate development built adjacent to the light rail line in the Rainier Valley was "The Station at Othello Park", a six-story, 351-unit apartment building that opened at the southeast corner of Martin Luther King Jr. Way and Othello Street in 2011. A second phase of the project, the 355-apartment "Othello North", will be built on the north side of Othello Street and open in 2017.

An additional low-income housing project was built north of Myrtle Street by Mercy Housing on surplus land used for equipment staging, which was auctioned by Sound Transit for $1.9 million in 2014. The 108-apartment building opened in July 2017, with its lowest rents at $450 per month.

The southwest corner of Martin Luther King Jr. Way and Othello Street was planned to be the site of a 500-unit apartment building and public market, but plans fell through in 2015 after developer Lobsang Dargey was accused of securities fraud by the Securities and Exchange Commission.

A small parking lot to the south of Othello station was converted into a sanctioned homeless encampment by the city government in March 2016, in response to the growing homelessness crisis in the city.

== History ==
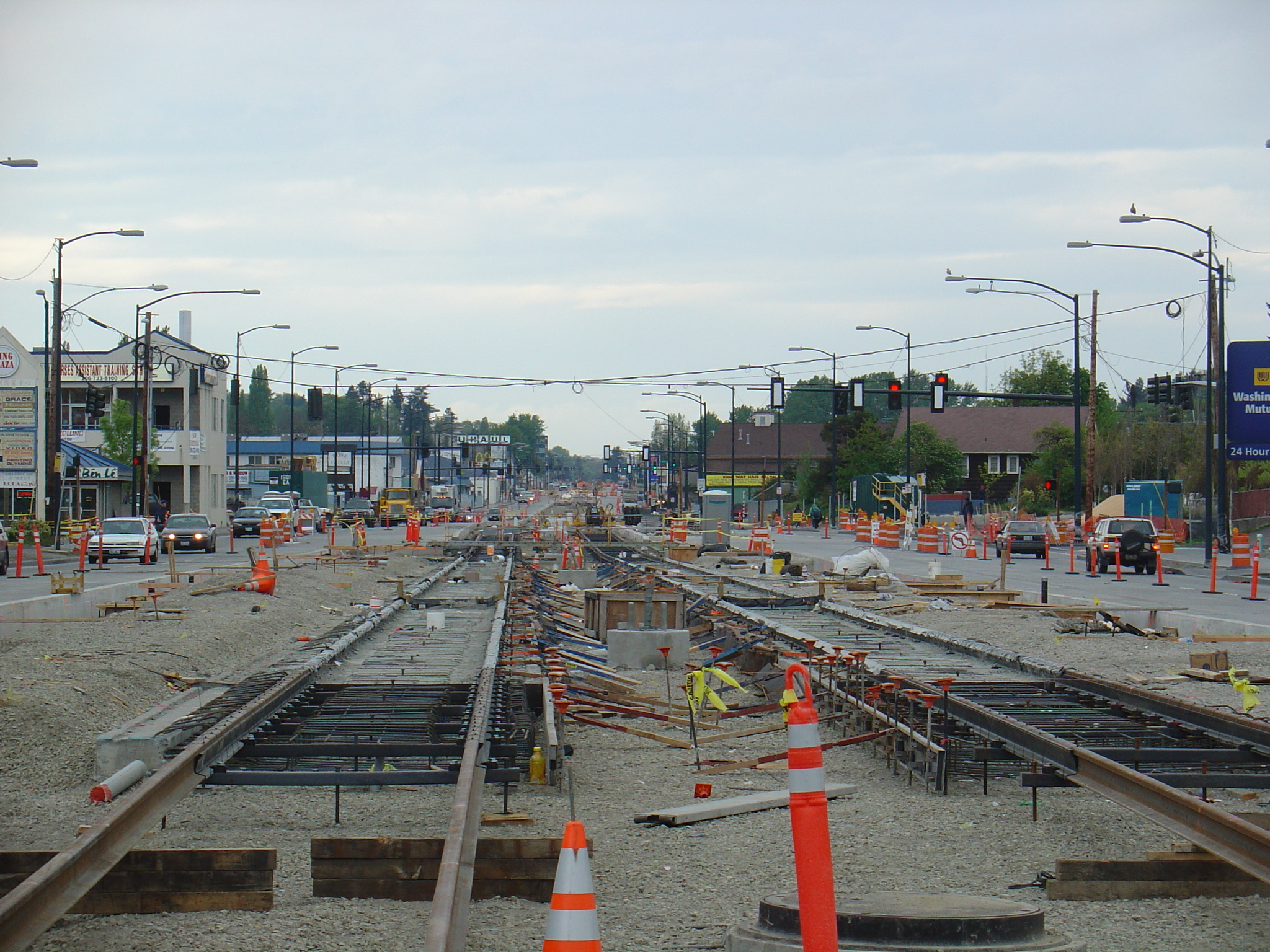
Light rail construction at Martin Luther King Jr. Way and Othello Street in April 2007

A modern light rail system was proposed by the newly formed Central Puget Sound Regional Transit Authority (RTA) in 1995, including a line running through the Rainier Valley with a stop at South Othello Street. After the $6.7 billion proposal was rejected by voters in March 1995, the RTA considered building a shorter elevated line on Rainier Avenue, including an option beginning at Columbia City, to the north of Othello, and ending in the University District. In November 1996, a condensed $3.9 billion regional transit plan was approved by voters, including a light rail line between Seattle and Sea-Tac Airport running through the Rainier Valley, with an at-grade station on Martin Luther King Jr. Way South at South Othello Street.

Concerns from Rainier Valley residents over blocked intersections, property acquisition, and equity led the RTA (later re-branded as Sound Transit) to study a $400 million tunnel through the Rainier Valley. In November 1999, the Sound Transit Board reaffirmed its selection of an at-grade alignment on Martin Luther King Jr. Way South, with a station at South Othello Street.

Sound Transit awarded a $128 million contract to the joint venture of Robinson Construction and Herzog Contracting (forming RCI-Herzog) in February 2004 for construction of the Rainier Valley segment of Central Link (now 1 Line). A groundbreaking ceremony for the Rainier Valley segment was held by Sound Transit at the future site of Othello station on June 8, 2004. Construction of the station began shortly thereafter and continued until late 2008. Light rail test trains began running through the Rainier Valley in August 2008, with service expected to start in July 2009. The station was opened on July 18, 2009, on the first day of Central Link service from Downtown Seattle to Tukwila International Boulevard station.

From August 21 to September 16, 2023, areas of Othello station were closed to replace broken and cracked tactile pavers on the platform edge. The project also required 1 Line trains to single-track through the Rainier Valley and reduced frequency to 15 and 30 minutes.

== Station layout ==
Othello station consists of two at-grade side platforms in the median of Martin Luther King Jr. Way South between Othello and Myrtle streets. The station is accessible from crosswalks at both streets, with the platforms running the entire length between the two. At both of the station's entrances are ticket vending machines and an ORCA card reader; beyond that lies the partially covered platform and waiting area, which includes seating and public art. The station also includes two public plazas at the northeast corners of both cross-streets, as well as eight public bicycle parking spots. Othello station, like others in the Rainier Valley, was designed by architecture firm Arai/Jackson.

=== Art ===
The station's former pictogram, which depicts a deer

Othello station also houses three art installations as part of the "STart" program, which allocates a percentage of project construction funds to art projects to be used in stations. Along both platforms, Brian Goldbloom's Stormwater Project consists of eight stormwater channels carved into granite pieces, using everyday objects in a design inspired by the Osaka Castle. At the northeast plaza on Myrtle Street is Roger Shimomura's Rainier Valley Haiku, a 13-foot-tall (4.0 m) sculpture that consists of a "totem pole" of stereotypical Asian American items, including a rice bowl, chopsticks, a Japanese wooden sandal, and a graduation cap. The piece is placed atop a pedestal with four haiku written in response to a viewing of the sculpture. Near the southeast plaza on Othello Street is Augusta Asberry's Come Dance with Me, a series of eight cut steel figures of African dancers in the style of traditional African art.

The station's former pictogram depicted a deer, which lived in the Othello area until the last of the population was relocated in the 1950s. It was created by Christian French as part of the Stellar Connections series and its points represented nearby destinations, including the Othello Playground, NewHolly neighborhood, and the Seattle Public Library's NewHolly branch. The pictogram series was retired in 2024 and replaced by station numbers.

== Services ==
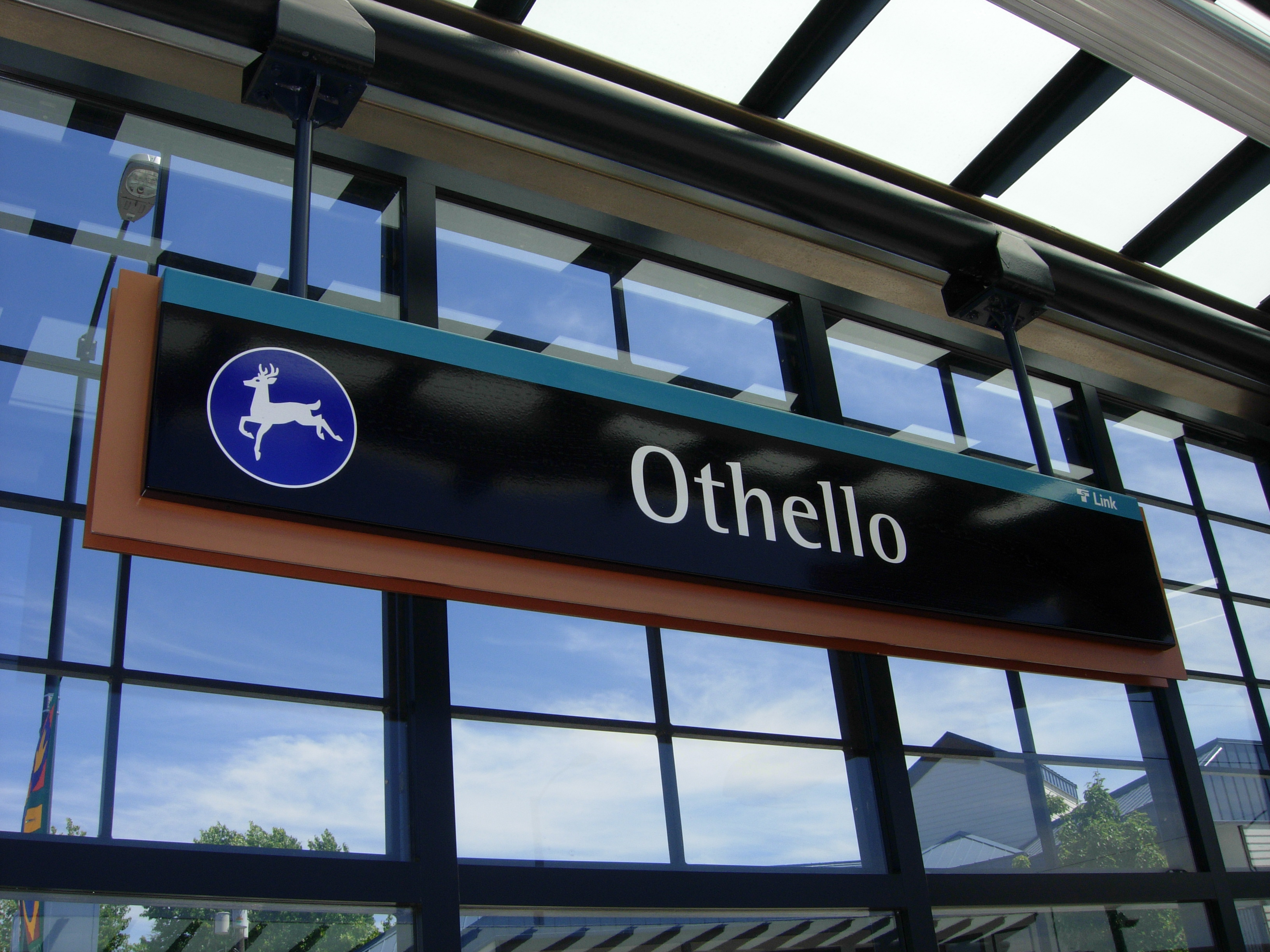
Signage for the station

Othello station is part of Sound Transit's 1 Line, which runs from between Lynnwood, the University of Washington campus, Downtown Seattle, the Rainier Valley, Seattle–Tacoma International Airport, and Federal Way. It is the eighteenth southbound station from Lynnwood City Center and seventh northbound station from Federal Way Downtown; Othello is situated between Columbia City and Rainier Beach stations. Trains serve the station twenty hours a day on weekdays and Saturdays, from 5:00 am to 1:00 am, and eighteen hours on Sundays, from 6:00 am to 12:00 am; during regular weekday service, trains operate roughly every eight to ten minutes during rush hour and midday operation, respectively, with longer headways of twelve to fifteen minutes in the early morning and at night. During weekends, Link trains arrive at Othello station every ten minutes during midday hours and every twelve to fifteen minutes during mornings and evenings. The station is approximately 53 minutes from Lynnwood City Center station, 21 minutes from Westlake station in Downtown Seattle, and 16 minutes from SeaTac/Airport station. In 2025, an average of 2,606 passengers boarded Link trains at Othello station on weekdays.

The station is also served by three bus routes operated by King County Metro that use bus stops adjacent to the station: Route 36, an electric trolleybus route, begins at the station and travels north through Beacon Hill and the International District to Downtown Seattle; Route 50 travels west from the station to Seward Park, Columbia City, SoDo and West Seattle; Route 106 provides local, frequent-stop service on Martin Luther King Jr. Way South as well as service to the International District, Renton and Skyway. Prior to March 2016, route 8 served the Martin Luther King Jr. Way corridor, connecting Othello station to the Central District, Capitol Hill, and Lower Queen Anne.

Metro also runs the Route 97 Link Shuttle, a shuttle service serving Link stations along surface streets during Link service disruptions, between Downtown and Rainier Valley stations. During the annual Seafair, free shuttle buses were used between Othello station and hydroplane races on Lake Washington at Genesee Park until 2013, when they moved to Columbia City station.
