= Columbia City station =

Light rail station in Seattle, Washington

58 Columbia City
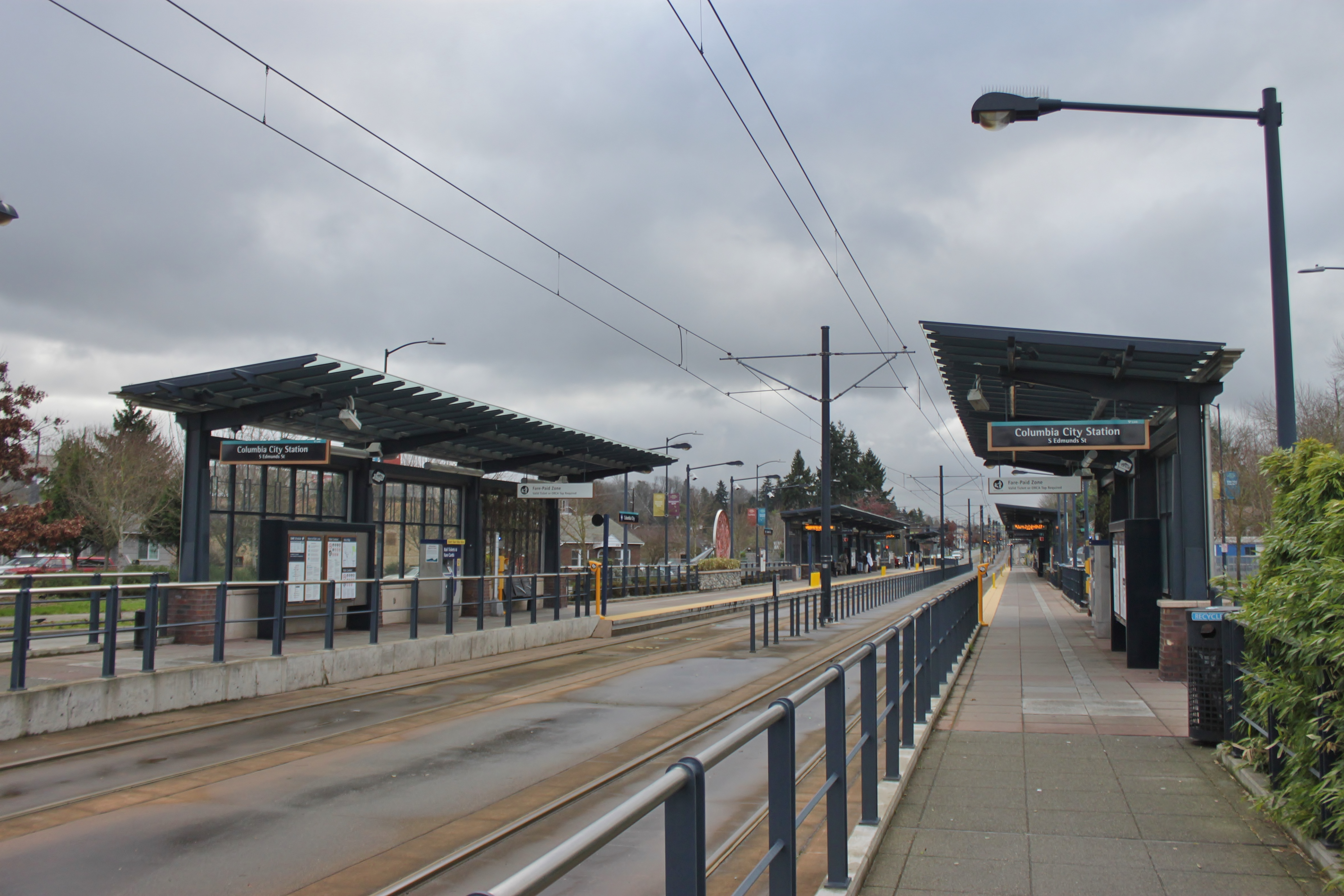
- The southbound platform at Columbia City Station

General information
- Location: 4818 Martin Luther King Jr. Way South; Seattle, Washington; United States
- Coordinates: 47°33′34″N 122°17′33″W
- System: Link light rail
- Owner: Sound Transit
- Platforms: 2 side platforms
- Tracks: 2
- Connections: King County Metro

Construction
- Structure type: At-grade
- Parking: Paid parking nearby
- Cycle facilities: Lockers
- Accessible: Yes

History
- Opened: July 18, 2009

Passengers
- 2,334 daily weekday boardings (2025); 803,733 total boardings (2025)

Services
| Preceding station | Sound Transit | Following station |
Link
| Mount Baker toward Lynnwood City Center | 1 Line | Othello toward Federal Way Downtown |
Location

Columbia City station is a light rail station located in Seattle, Washington. It is situated between the Othello and Mount Baker stations on the 1 Line, which runs from Seattle–Tacoma International Airport to Downtown Seattle and the University of Washington as part of the Link light rail system. The station consists of two at-grade side platforms between South Alaska Street and South Edmunds Street in the median of Martin Luther King Jr. Way South in the Columbia City neighborhood, part of Seattle's Rainier Valley.

The station opened on July 18, 2009. Trains serve the station twenty hours a day on most days; the headway between trains is eight minutes during peak periods, with less frequent service at other times. Columbia City station is also served by two King County Metro bus routes that connect it to Mount Baker, Renton and West Seattle.

== Location ==
Columbia City station is located in the median of Martin Luther King Jr. Way between Alaska and Edmunds streets in the Columbia City neighborhood of Seattle's Rainier Valley. It is approximately six blocks west of the neighborhood's central business district and designated historic district, centered on Rainier Avenue.

The station is located downhill from Cheasty Boulevard South, a preserved Olmsted boulevard and city landmark running along the east edge of Beacon Hill; other parks in the area include Genesee Park to the east of the Columbia City business district, Columbia Park, the Rainier Playfield, and Hitt's Hill Park.

=== Transit-oriented development ===
The area surrounding Columbia City station consists primarily of single-family detached homes with some multi-family units, including some low-income housing at the Seattle Housing Authority's Rainier Vista public housing development. It is noted as one of the most diverse neighborhoods in the Seattle metropolitan area, with 75 percent of its 5,667 residents identifying as part of a racial minority; the neighborhood also has 1,502 jobs located within a half-mile (0.8 km) of the station. Height limits in the area range from 40 feet (12 m) adjacent to the station to 65 feet (20 m) along Rainier Avenue.

The construction of the light rail station has triggered interest in transit-oriented development by private developers in proximity to Columbia City station. New market rate apartments, the first in four decades for the neighborhood, were opened by Harbor Urban in 2012. The Zion Preparatory Academy sold its campus to developers in 2009 for $5 million; the 6-acre (2.4 ha) site was redeveloped into a six-building complex with 244 apartments by The Wolff Company in 2015.

== History ==
Columbia City was established in 1891 as a streetcar suburb by J. K. Edmiston, the owner of the Rainier Avenue Electric Railway. Edmiston had built the line and a lumber mill on the site of old-growth forests to aid in the rebuilding of Downtown Seattle after the Great Seattle Fire of 1889. The 40-acre (16 ha) site was later named "Columbia" and plotted for homes, and incorporated in 1893 as "Columbia City". The city was annexed by the city of Seattle in 1907 after Edmiston sold the railway and left the fledgling town, who felt their tax base was too small to support the area's growth. The Rainier Avenue line would cease operations on January 1, 1937, in order to pave Rainier Avenue; service was replaced by motor buses, after an unsuccessful attempt to extend the Seattle Municipal Street Railway to the area.

A modern light rail system was proposed by a newly formed regional transit authority (RTA) in 1995, including a line running on Rainier Avenue between Downtown Seattle and Seattle–Tacoma International Airport that stopped in Columbia City. After the $6.7 billion proposal was rejected by voters in March 1995, the RTA considered building a shorter elevated line on Rainier Avenue, including an option beginning at Columbia City and ending in the University District. In November 1996, a condensed $3.9 billion regional transit plan was approved by voters, including a light rail line between Seattle and Sea-Tac Airport that ran through the Rainier Valley, with an elevated station on Rainier Avenue South at South Edmunds Street in Columbia City.

Concerns from Rainier Valley residents over blocked intersections, property acquisition and equity led the RTA (later re-branded as Sound Transit) to study a $400 million tunnel through the Rainier Valley. In November 1999, the Sound Transit Board instead selected an at-grade alignment on Martin Luther King Jr. Way to the west of Rainier, with a station at South Edmunds Street.

Sound Transit awarded a $128 million contract to the joint venture of Robinson Construction and Herzog Contracting (forming RCI-Herzog) in February 2004 for construction of the Rainier Valley segment of Central Link (now the 1 Line). Construction began later that year, with early work on Martin Luther King Jr. Way primarily consisting of utility relocation, property condemnation and reconstruction of the roadway. Station construction at the Edmunds Street station, since renamed Columbia City, began in September 2006 and was completed in 2008. Light rail test trains began running through the Rainier Valley in August 2008, with service expected to start in July 2009.

The station was opened on July 18, 2009, on the first day of Central Link service from Downtown Seattle to Tukwila International Boulevard station. Local businesses celebrated the arrival of light rail by offering discounts and free samples to patrons with light rail tickets.

Sound Transit began replacing damaged tactile tiles on the Columbia City station platforms in July 2022, which forced trains to single-track through the station. The northbound platform was closed for nine days while service on the line south of Stadium station was reduced to 20-minute frequencies. The southbound platform was closed for eight days in late August with a similar service reduction.

== Station layout ==
Columbia City station consists of two at-grade side platforms in the median of Martin Luther King Jr. Way between Edmunds and Alaska streets. The station is accessible from crosswalks at both streets, with the platforms running the entire length between the two. At both of the station's entrances are ticket vending machines and an ORCA card reader; beyond that lies the partially covered platform and waiting area, which includes seating and public art. The station, like others in the Rainier Valley, was designed by architecture firm Arai/Jackson, and incorporates references to Craftsman-style homes that populate the neighborhood.

To the east of the station's south entrance on Edmunds Street is a small public plaza with landscaping, seating, and bicycle amenities. The station's "bike plaza" was opened in November 2011, with 46 secure lockers for bicycles.

=== Art ===
The station's former pictogram, which depicts a dove

Columbia City station also houses four art installations as part of the "STart" program, which allocates a percentage of project construction funds to art projects to be used in stations. The main theme of the station is gardening, reflected in three of the four sculptures.

The most prominent piece at the station is Victoria Fuller's "Global Garden Shovel", a 35-foot-tall (11 m) bronze sculpture of a shovel at the northwest corner of MLK Jr. Way and Alaska Street. The shovel's surface is cast from molds of indigenous plants, fruits and vegetables from around the world; Fuller drew inspiration from the number of home gardens she saw in the Rainier Valley and sought to represent the neighborhood's cultural and racial diversity. Gale McCall's "A Relic in the Garden" consists of two large magnifying glasses in the planter boxes on the side of the station platforms, and four bronze baskets at the station's entrances that are illuminated at night. The magnifying glasses have open lenses that are filled with outlines of flowers, guarden faucets, baseball bats, and other "relics".

At the station's public plaza at South Edmunds Street, two installations from Juan Alonso and Norie Sato create an enclosure of the public space. Sato's "Pride" consists of stone, bricks and bronze lions, in the style of various cultures, that were placed to guard the plaza's entrances. Alonso's "Garden Windows" is on the back wall of a systems building and consists of several glass windows in the brick wall, with abstract depictions of circulatory systems found in the human body, plants and the Interstate highways.

The station's former pictogram, a dove, referenced the constellation Columba (named for the dove in Latin). It was created by Christian French as part of the Stellar Connections series and its points represented nearby destinations, including Columbia Park, the Columbia City Library, Rainier Valley Cultural Center, Ark Lodge, and Orca K-8 School. The pictogram series was retired in 2024 and replaced by station numbers.

== Services ==
Columbia City station is part of Sound Transit's 1 Line, which runs from between Lynnwood, the University of Washington campus, Downtown Seattle, the Rainier Valley, Seattle–Tacoma International Airport, and Federal Way. It is the seventeenth southbound station from Lynnwood City Center and eighth northbound station from Federal Way Downtown; Columbia City is situated between Mount Baker and Othello stations. Trains serve the station twenty hours a day on weekdays and Saturdays, from 5:00 am to 1:00 am, and eighteen hours on Sundays, from 6:00 am to 12:00 am; during regular weekday service, trains operate roughly every eight to ten minutes during rush hour and midday operation, respectively, with longer headways of twelve to fifteen minutes in the early morning and at night. During weekends, Link trains arrive at Columbia City station every ten minutes during midday hours and every twelve to fifteen minutes during mornings and evenings. The station is approximately 49 minutes from Lynnwood City Center station, 17 minutes from Westlake station in Downtown Seattle, and 20 minutes from SeaTac/Airport station. In 2025, an average of 2,334 passengers boarded Link trains at Columbia City station on weekdays.

The station is also served by two bus routes operated by King County Metro that use bus stops adjacent to the station: Route 50 travels east–west between West Seattle, SoDo, Columbia City, Seward Park and Othello station; and Route 106 provides local, frequent-stop service on Martin Luther King Jr. Way South between Rainier Beach and Mount Baker stations, while also serving the International District, Skyway and Renton. Prior to March 2016, route 8 served the Martin Luther King Jr. Way corridor, connecting Columbia City station to the Central District, Capitol Hill, and Lower Queen Anne.

Metro also runs the Route 97 Link Shuttle, a shuttle service serving Link stations along surface streets during Link service disruptions, between Downtown and Rainier Valley stations. During the annual Seafair, free shuttle buses are used between Columbia City station and hydroplane races on Lake Washington at Genesee Park.
