= Tutta Bella Neapolitan Pizzeria =

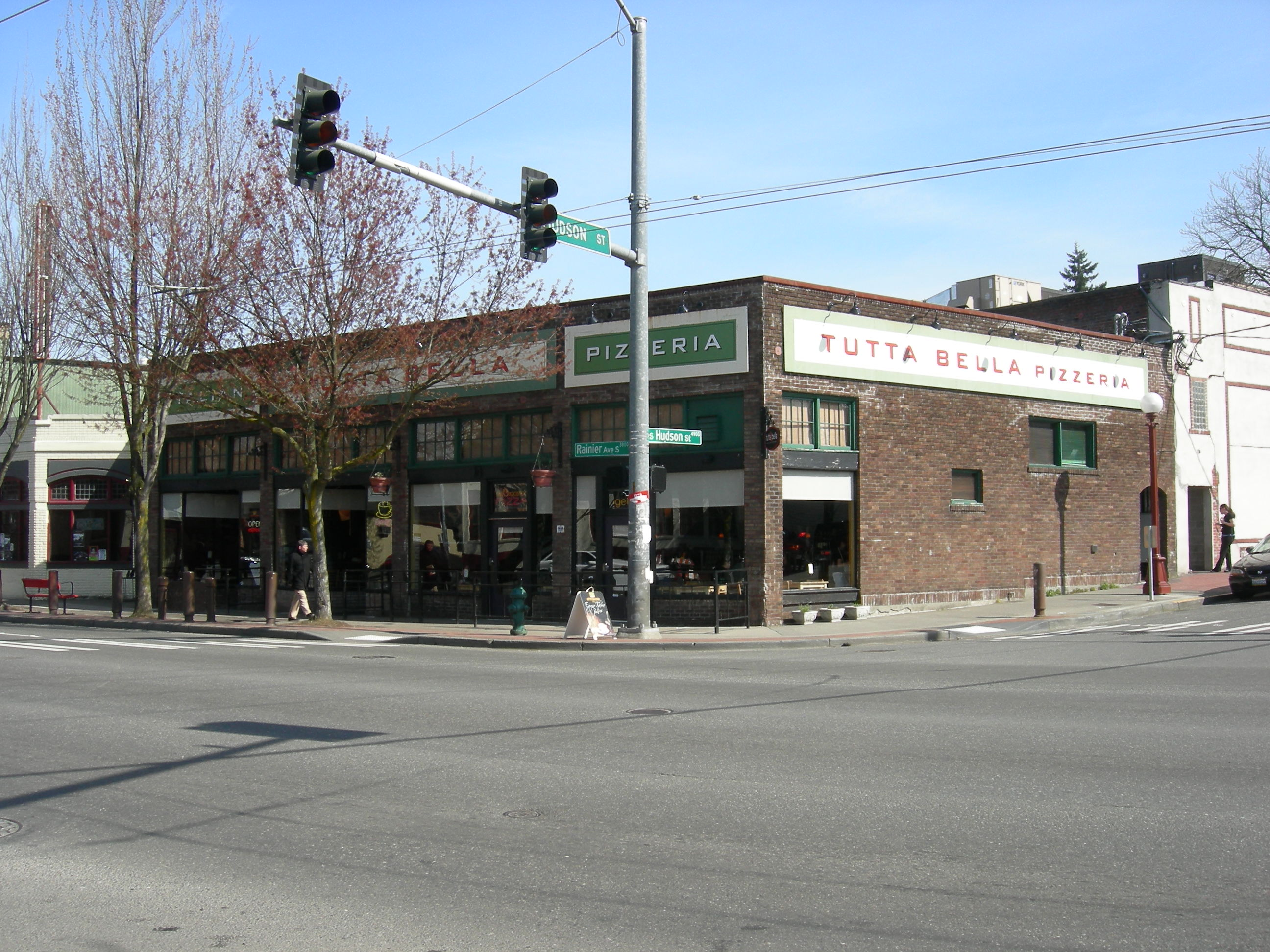
- Tutta Bella's Columbia City location

Restaurant information
- Location: Washington, United States
- Other locations: Columbia City; Stone Way; Westlake; Crossroads; Issaquah; Kirkland
- Website: www.tuttabella.com

Tutta Bella Neapolitan Pizzeria is an Italian restaurant chain with six locations in Washington, United States. The first location was founded in 2004. The restaurant specializes in "authentic" Neapolitan pizza and is certified by the non-profit Associazione Verace Pizza Napoletana ('True Neapolitan Pizza Association') which certifies pizzerias that use traditional ingredients and processes. Tutta Bella was the first restaurant in the Pacific Northwest to receive such certification.

Tutta Bella was founded by Joe Fugere with a location in Columbia City in January 2004. Since then, five other locations and a food truck have opened in Seattle and its suburbs.

== Menu ==
To maintain its certification by the Associazione Verace Pizza Napoletana, Tutta Bella in required to follow preparation and cooking instructions for its pizzas. For example, specific types of ingredients are used in the pizza (fresh basil and herbs, fior di latte cheese), including a particular type of flour (tipo 00) and San Marzano tomatoes imported from Naples as well a specific type of oven (bell shaped, wood fired, with a 5-inch thick bottom).

The restaurant also sells appetizers and salads, Attibassi espresso, and tiramisu from a family recipe.

== Donations and recognition ==
Tutta Bella also engages in community donations, fundraising and outreach programs and has donated money to several local schools and organizations, often through partnerships with organizations like the Issaquah Food Bank and the Bellevue Schools Foundation.

Tutta Bella brought one of their wood-fired ovens to a local U.S. Air Force base for President Barack Obama's visit. The pizza, a special item called "Il Presidente", was eaten on Air Force One.

== Locations ==
- Columbia City
- Stone Way
- Westlake
- Crossroads
- Issaquah
- Kirkland
