= Victoria Fuller =

Victoria Fuller may refer to:

- Victoria Fuller (artist), artist and sculptor
- Victoria Fuller (model), glamour model, artist, and actress
