= Brighton, Seattle =

Neighborhood of Seattle, Washington

Coordinates: 47°32′46″N 122°16′29″W

Brighton is a primarily residential neighborhood in southern Seattle, Washington, part of the greater Rainier Valley district and centered about a mile and a half south of the Columbia City neighborhood.

The neighborhood was settled by English immigrants in the 1880s, who named it "Brighton Beach" after the English resort city of Brighton in East Sussex.

It is several blocks from the Othello light rail station. The neighborhood was served by the Rainier Avenue Electric Railway from 1891 until it closed in 1937.

According to the US census, 90% of Brighton residents self-reported as being non-white in 2010.
