= Columbia City Historic District (Seattle) =

Historic district in Washington, United States

- U.S. National Register of Historic Places
- U.S. Historic district
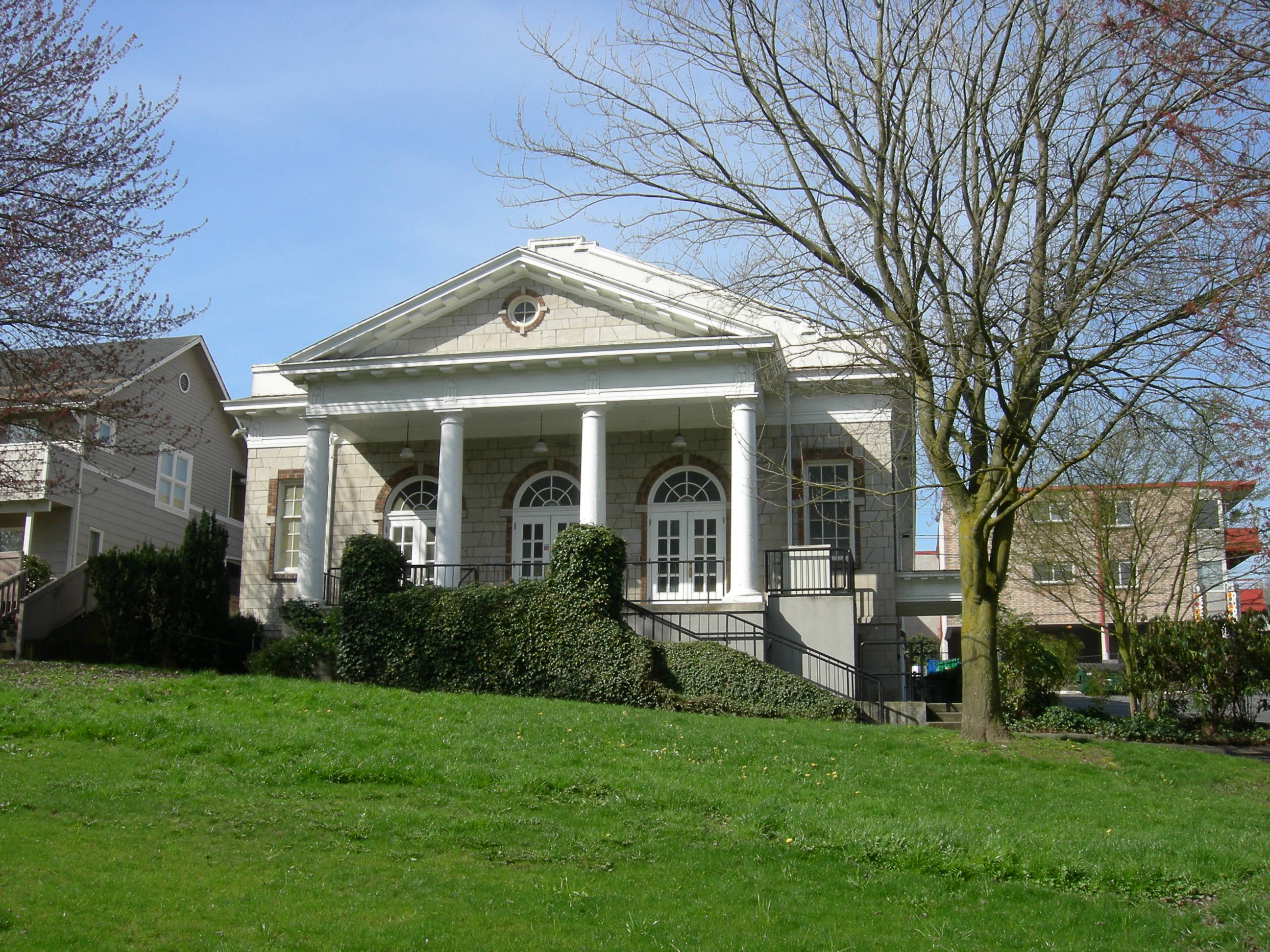
- Rainier Valley Cultural Center, the former Fifth Church of Christ, Scientist

- Location within Washington (state) Location within the United States
- Location: Roughly bounded by S. Hudson and S. Alaska Sts., 35th and Rainier Aves., Seattle, Washington
- Coordinates: 47°33′33″N 122°17′8″W
- Built: 1891
- Architectural style: Mission/Spanish Revival, Colonial Revival
- NRHP reference No.: 80004000
- Added to NRHP: September 8, 1980

The Columbia City Historic District is a nationally recognized historic district located in the Columbia City neighborhood in the Rainier Valley area of Seattle, Washington. It is roughly bounded by South Hudson Street, South Alaska Street, 35th Avenue and Rainier Avenue. Its historic uses include specialty stores, multiple dwellings, single dwellings, meeting halls, schools, religious structures, and parks. Its architecture includes Mission Revival, Spanish Revival, Colonial Revival and other styles. On September 8, 1980, it was added to the National Register of Historic Places.

== Contributing properties ==
The district contains 33 contributing resources, the list contains a mix of residential, commercial, and institutional buildings, and a park. Includes:

- Fifth Church of Christ, Scientist building, which is now the Rainier Valley Cultural Center.
