= Rainier Beach station =

Light rail station in Seattle, Washington

61 Rainier Beach
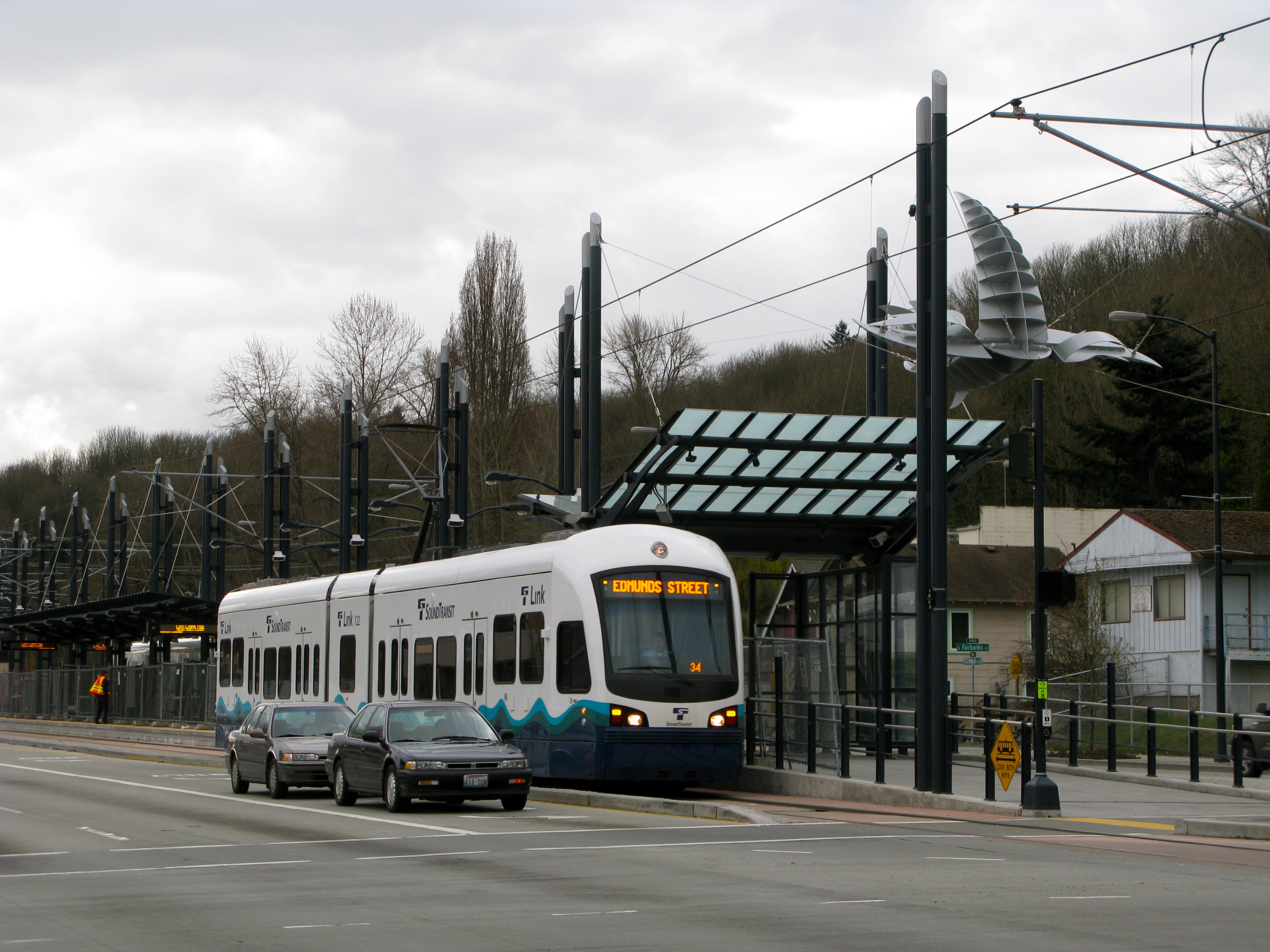
- A test train at Rainier Beach station prior to its opening

General information
- Location: 9132 Martin Luther King Jr. Way South; Seattle, Washington; United States
- Coordinates: 47°31′21.4″N 122°16′45.7″W
- System: Link light rail
- Owner: Sound Transit
- Platforms: 1 island platform
- Tracks: 2
- Connections: King County Metro

Construction
- Structure type: At-grade
- Parking: Paid parking nearby
- Cycle facilities: Lockers
- Accessible: Yes

History
- Opened: July 18, 2009

Passengers
- 1,778 daily weekday boardings (2025); 599,168 total boardings (2025)

Services
Preceding station	Sound Transit	Following station
Link
Othello toward Lynnwood City Center	1 Line	Tukwila International Boulevard toward Federal Way Downtown
Location

Rainier Beach station is a light rail station in Seattle, Washington. It is between the Tukwila International Boulevard and Othello stations on the 1 Line. The line is part of the Link light rail system under the management of Sound Transit. The station consists of an at-grade island platform south of South Henderson Street in the median of Martin Luther King Jr. Way in the Rainier Beach neighborhood, part of Seattle's Rainier Valley.

The Rainier Beach area was proposed for light rail service in 1995 and included in the final plan for Central Link (now the 1 Line) approved in 1999. Construction on Rainier Beach station began in 2006, and regular train service began on July 18, 2009. Trains serve the station twenty hours a day on most days; the headway between trains is eight minutes during peak periods, with less frequent service at other times. Rainier Beach station is also served by three King County Metro bus routes that connect it to Beacon Hill, Downtown Seattle, Georgetown, Mount Baker and Renton. The station also has six art installations that were funded by a systemwide art program.

== Location ==
Rainier Beach station is located in the median of Martin Luther King Jr. Way at an intersection with South Henderson Street. The station is a one-half mile (0.8 km); (eight blocks) west of the center of the Rainier Beach neighborhood, where Rainier Beach High School and Beer Sheva Park are both located. The Chief Sealth Trail crosses over Martin Luther King Jr. Way to the north of the station, continuing north to Beacon Hill and south to Kubota Garden.

Development around the Rainier Beach station has historically consisted of single-family housing and low-rise multi-family residential complexes, as well as some light industrial buildings. Within 1/2 mile (0.8 km) of the station is a population of 4,691 people and 811 jobs. The City of Seattle has proposed redevelopment of the station area into a "food innovation district", with a farmers' market, food carts and restaurants to serve local residents and visitors. The city also plans for improvements to the Henderson Street corridor and traditional transit-oriented housing and office development within walking distance of the station. A grassroots campaign to improve Henderson Street, named "Link2Lake", was started in 2016 to advocate for a pedestrian-friendly connection between the station and Be'er Sheva Park on Lake Washington.

== History ==
A modern light rail system was proposed by a newly formed regional transit authority (RTA) in 1995, including a line running through the Rainier Valley on Martin Luther King Jr. Way with a stop at South Henderson Street to serve Rainier Beach. The $6.7 billion proposal was rejected by voters in March 1995, and the RTA proposed a smaller, $3.9 billion transit system with an at-grade station at South Henderson Street; the new proposal was approved by voters in November 1996. The RTA, which renamed itself to Sound Transit, selected an at-grade alignment for light rail on Martin Luther King Jr. Way South in 1999, with a station at South Henderson Street.

Sound Transit awarded a $128 million contract to the joint venture of Robinson Construction and Herzog Contracting (forming RCI-Herzog) in February 2004 for construction of the Rainier Valley segment of Central Link (now the 1 Line). Construction of the station at Henderson Street began in late 2006 and continued until late 2008. Light rail test trains began running through the Rainier Valley in August 2008, with service expected to start in July 2009.

The station was opened on July 18, 2009, on the first day of Central Link service from Downtown Seattle to Tukwila International Boulevard station. The line's opening celebration, which included free service and entertainment events throughout the Rainier Valley, was attended by over 92,000 people over a two-day period. Parts of the station, including the platform and a train, were damaged by gunfire during an incident on March 24, 2016. The shooting suspended train service to the station for several hours for a police investigation.

From August 21 to September 16, 2023, part of the station's platform was closed to replace broken and cracked tactile pavers; the project required 1 Line trains to single-track through the Rainier Valley and reduced frequency to 15 and 30 minutes.

== Station layout ==
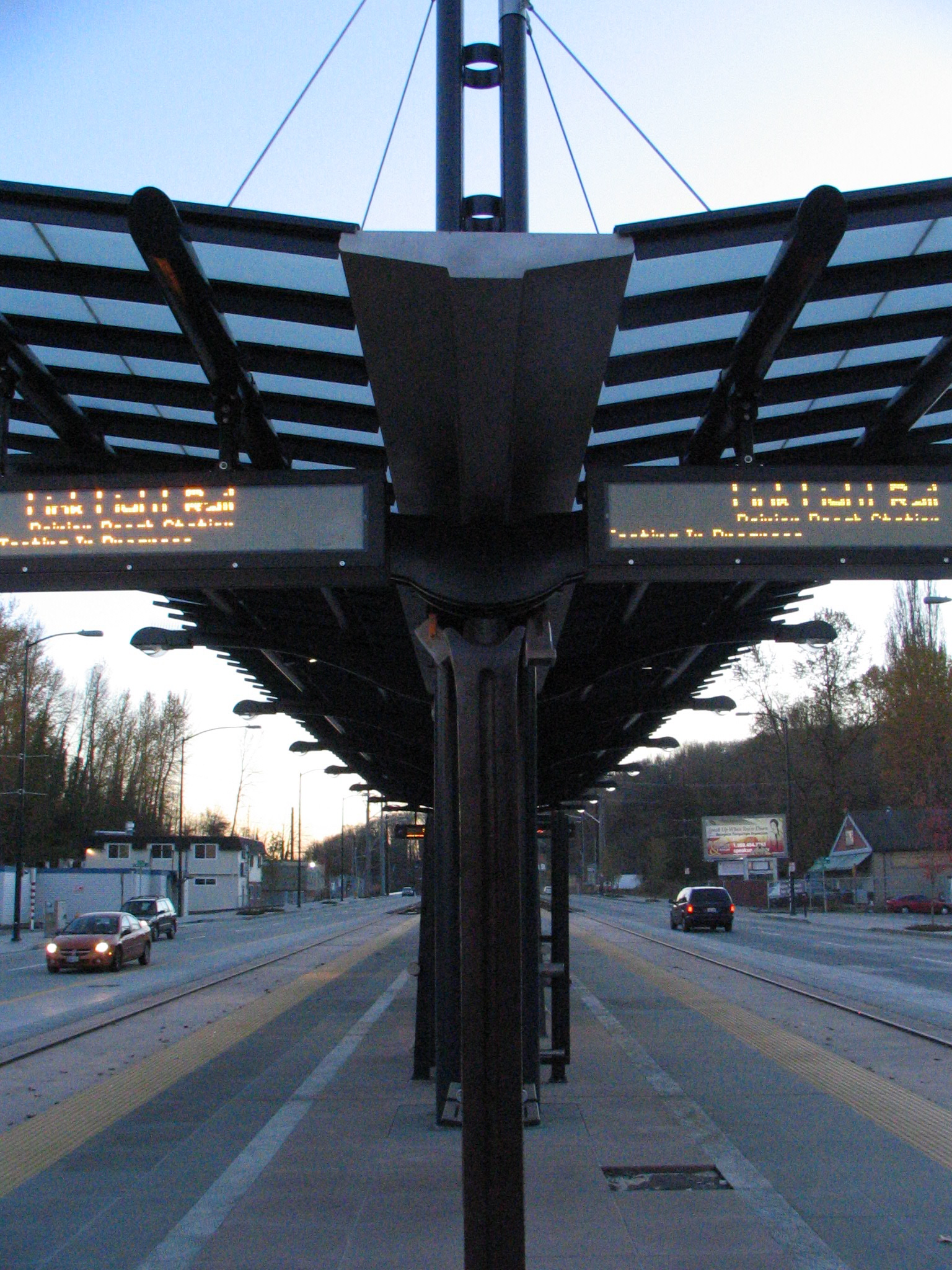
The station's platform, 2009

Rainier Beach station consists of a single, at-grade island platform in the median of Martin Luther King Jr. Way South on the south side of South Henderson Street. The station has a single entrance at Henderson, accessible via two crosswalks. A small plaza on the northeast corner of the intersection has seating, a bicycle locker with 34 spaces, a bus stop, and public art. Rainier Beach station, like others in the Rainier Valley, was designed by architecture firm Arai/Jackson.

Immediately south of the platform is an operator's building with washrooms and workrooms for staff, a janitor's closet, and supervisor's office. There is also an 800-foot-long (240 m) turnback track in the median of Martin Luther King Jr. Way to the south of the station that is used to store two 4-car trains for emergencies and headway management.

=== Art ===
The station's former pictogram, which depicts a heron

Rainier Beach station also houses six art installations as part of the "STart" program, which allocates a percentage of project construction funds to art projects to be used in stations. At the station's detached plaza is Buster Simpson's Parable, a metal sculpture resembling sliced pears wrapped in metal wire; Simpson's piece is an allegorical commentary on the changing urban landscape of Seattle and the Rainier Valley, using recycled rails and rusted cast iron to form the major elements. Darlene Nguyen-Ely's Dragonfly, an aluminum sculpture of a winged creature, is suspended above the station's lone entrance on Henderson Street; Dragonfly draws inspiration from the station's architectural elements and is meant to conjure the imagery of flight and wind. Eugene Parnell's Increment on the station platform consists of four bronze columns with markings in relief representing systems of measurement used around the world as well as height comparisons with various animals. Three glass mosaics from Mauricio Robalino, Flores, Fishmobile and Pinwheel, decorate a nearby electrical substation with patterns inspired by Ecuadorian textiles.

The station's former pictogram depicted a heron, inspired by the theme of flight presented by Darlene Nguyen-Ely's sculpture Dragonfly. It was created by Christian French as part of the Stellar Connections series, another "STart" project, that projected destinations near stations onto fixed points within the pictogram. The points in Rainier Beach station's pictogram represented Rainier Beach High School, the Seattle Public Library's Rainier Beach branch, Beer Sheva Park, and Pritchard Island Beach. The pictogram series was retired in 2024 and replaced by station numbers.

== Services ==
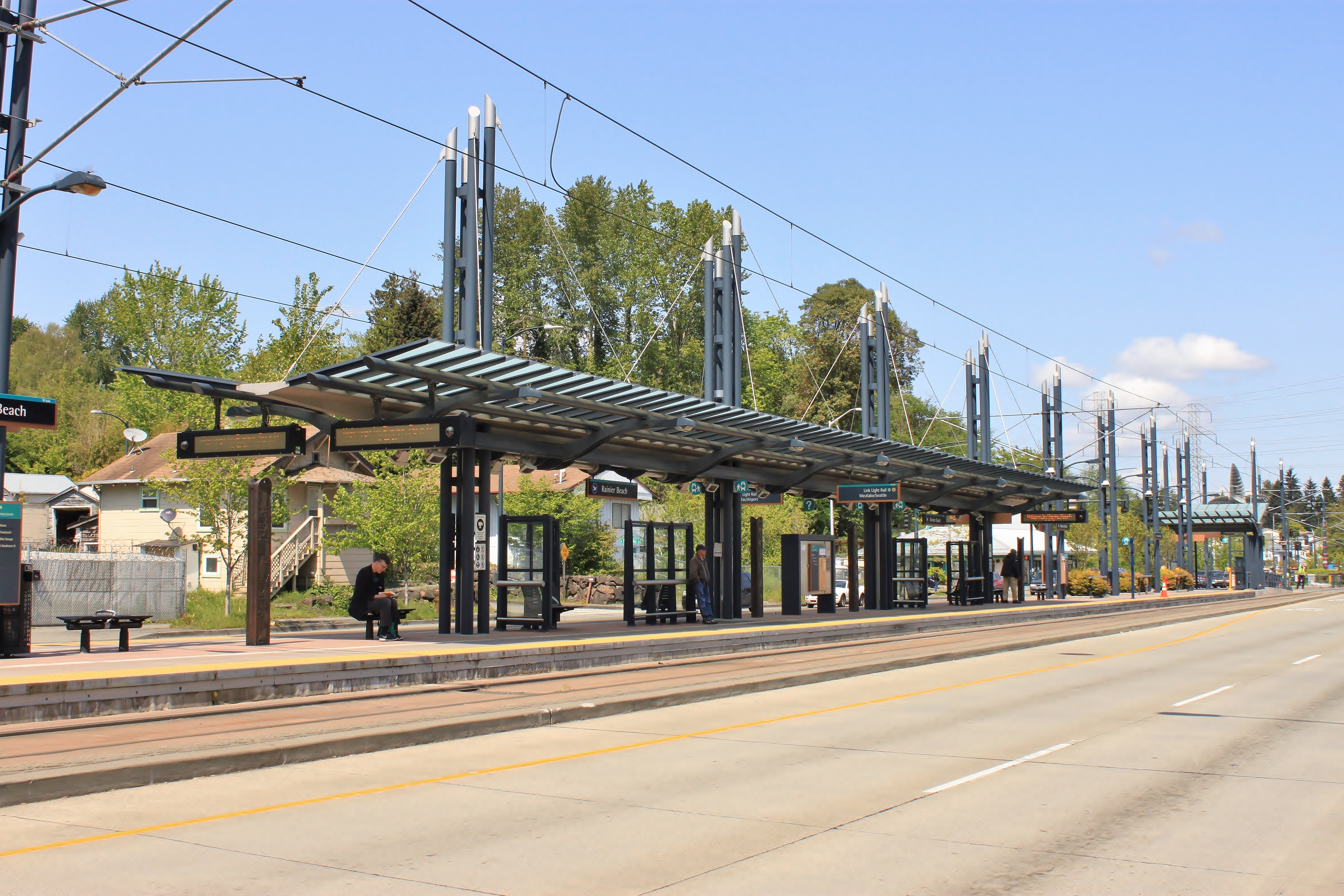
The station platform in 2015, looking from the east side of Martin Luther King Jr. Way

Rainier Beach station is part of Sound Transit's 1 Line, which runs from between Lynnwood, the University of Washington campus, Downtown Seattle, the Rainier Valley, Seattle–Tacoma International Airport, and Federal Way. It is the nineteenth southbound station from Lynnwood City Center and sixth northbound station from Federal Way Downtown; Rainier Beach is situated between Othello and Tukwila International Boulevard stations. Trains serve the station twenty hours a day on weekdays and Saturdays, from 5:00 am to 1:00 am, and eighteen hours on Sundays, from 6:00 am to 12:00 am; during regular weekday service, trains operate roughly every eight to ten minutes during rush hour and midday operation, respectively, with longer headways of twelve to fifteen minutes in the early morning and at night. During weekends, Link trains arrive at Rainier Beach station every ten minutes during midday hours and every twelve to fifteen minutes during mornings and evenings. The station is approximately 56 minutes from Lynnwood City Center station, 24 minutes from Westlake station in Downtown Seattle, and 13 minutes from SeaTac/Airport station. In 2025, an average of 1,778 passengers boarded Link trains at Rainier Beach station on weekdays.

The station is also served by three bus routes operated by King County Metro that use bus stops adjacent to the station: Route 9 Express, which runs along Rainier Avenue during peak periods towards Downtown Seattle, First Hill and Capitol Hill; Route 106, which provides frequent-stop local service on Martin Luther King Jr. Way South, parallel to Link, and continues southeast to Skyway and Renton; and Route 107, which originates in Renton and travels northwest to Georgetown and Beacon Hill. Metro's Route 7, a major electric trolleybus route, stops several blocks east on Rainier Avenue. Prior to March 2016, route 8 served the Martin Luther King Jr. Way corridor, terminating at the station and traveling north to the Central District, Capitol Hill, and Lower Queen Anne. Metro also runs the Route 97 Link Shuttle, a shuttle service serving Link stations along surface streets during Link service disruptions, between Downtown and Rainier Valley stations.
