= SeaTac/Airport station =

Light rail station in SeaTac, Washington

64 SeaTac/Airport
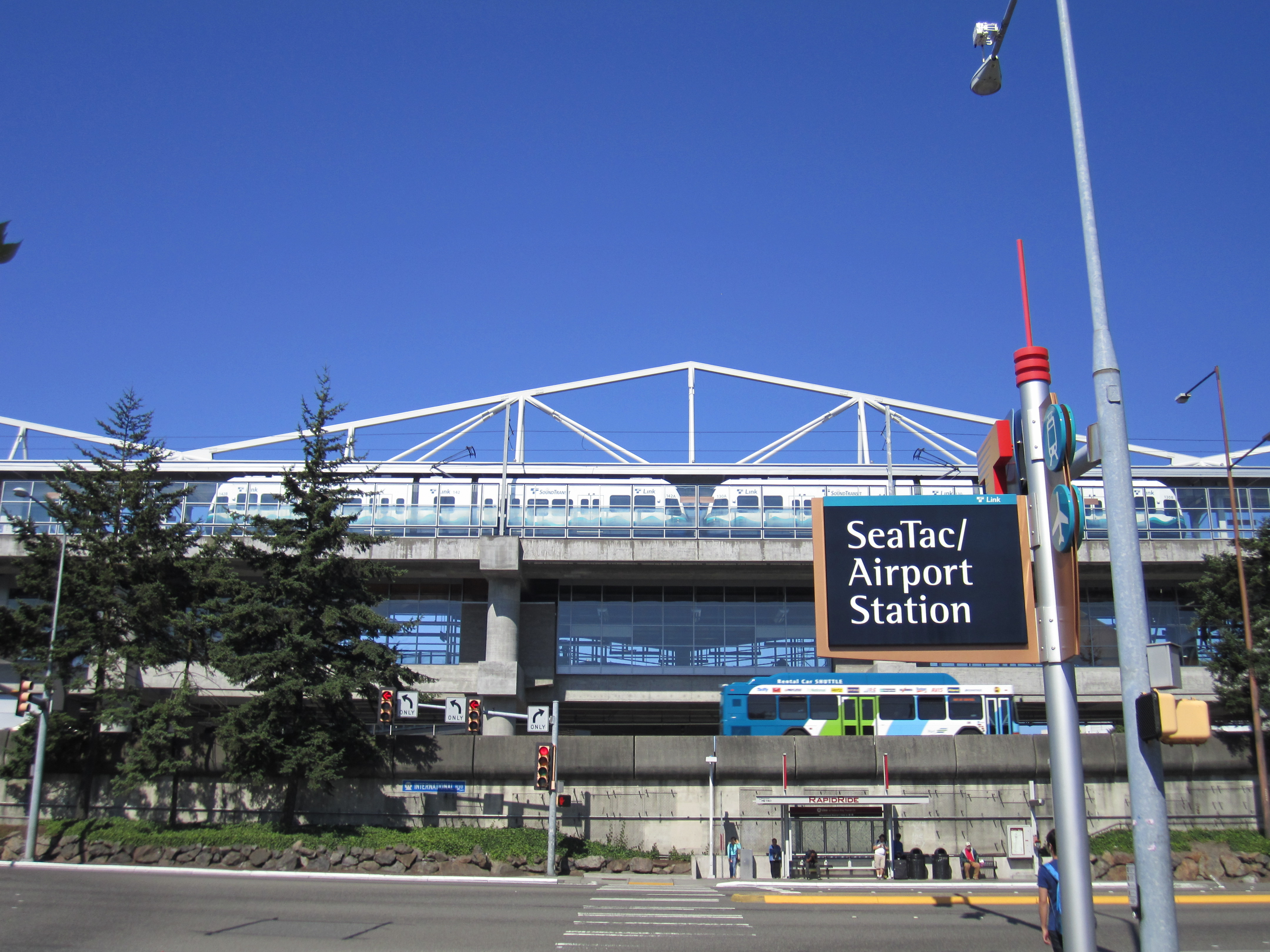
- The station viewed from International Boulevard, 2014

General information
- Location: International Blvd & South 176th Street; SeaTac, Washington; United States
- Coordinates: 47°26′43″N 122°17′49″W
- System: Link light rail
- Owner: Sound Transit
- Platforms: 1 island platform
- Tracks: 2
- Connections: King County Metro (RapidRide), Sound Transit Express

Construction
- Structure type: Elevated
- Parking: Paid parking nearby, kiss and ride facility
- Cycle facilities: Lockers
- Accessible: Yes

History
- Opened: December 19, 2009

Passengers
- 10,118 daily weekday boardings (2025); 3,738,450 total boardings (2025)

Services
Preceding station	Sound Transit	Following station
Link
Tukwila International Boulevard toward Lynnwood City Center	1 Line	Angle Lake toward Federal Way Downtown
Location

SeaTac/Airport station is a light rail station in SeaTac, Washington, serving Seattle–Tacoma International Airport. It is on the 1 Line between Angle Lake and Tukwila International Boulevard stations. The line, part of Sound Transit's Link light rail system, runs north from SeaTac through the Rainier Valley to Downtown Seattle and the University of Washington. The station consists of an elevated island platform east of the terminals and parking garage of the airport.

SeaTac/Airport station opened on December 19, 2009, several months after the rest of the Central Link stations. Until the opening of Angle Lake station in 2016, it served as the line's southern terminus. Trains serve the station twenty hours a day on most days; the headway between trains is eight minutes during peak periods, with less frequent service at other times. SeaTac/Airport station is also served by the RapidRide A Line, two Sound Transit Express bus routes and two King County Metro bus routes.

== Location ==
SeaTac/Airport station is on the west side of International Boulevard at South 176th Street, northeast of the Seattle–Tacoma International Airport main terminal and adjacent to the airport parking garage. The area to the east of the station along International Boulevard consists primarily of hotels and airport parking lots, with some offices, multi-family housing and mobile home parks. Within a 1/2 mile (0.80 km) radius of the station is a population of 4,024 residents and a total of 9,187 jobs.

The area surrounding SeaTac/Airport station is designated as a Regional Growth Center by the Puget Sound Regional Council and is zoned to support mid- and high-rise buildings. The SeaTac City Council adopted a station area action plan in 2006 that called for mixed-use development in a pedestrian-friendly environment adjacent to the station. The plan proposes residential uses as well as neighborhood-oriented hospitality services and commercial offices near an "entertainment district" with open spaces for public gatherings. In late 2009, the city placed a moratorium on new development near the station after a controversy over the use of eminent domain related to the entertainment district plan. After the late 2000s recession and subsequent shortfalls in tax revenue, the entertainment district plan was dropped entirely in June 2010 by the city council.

== History ==
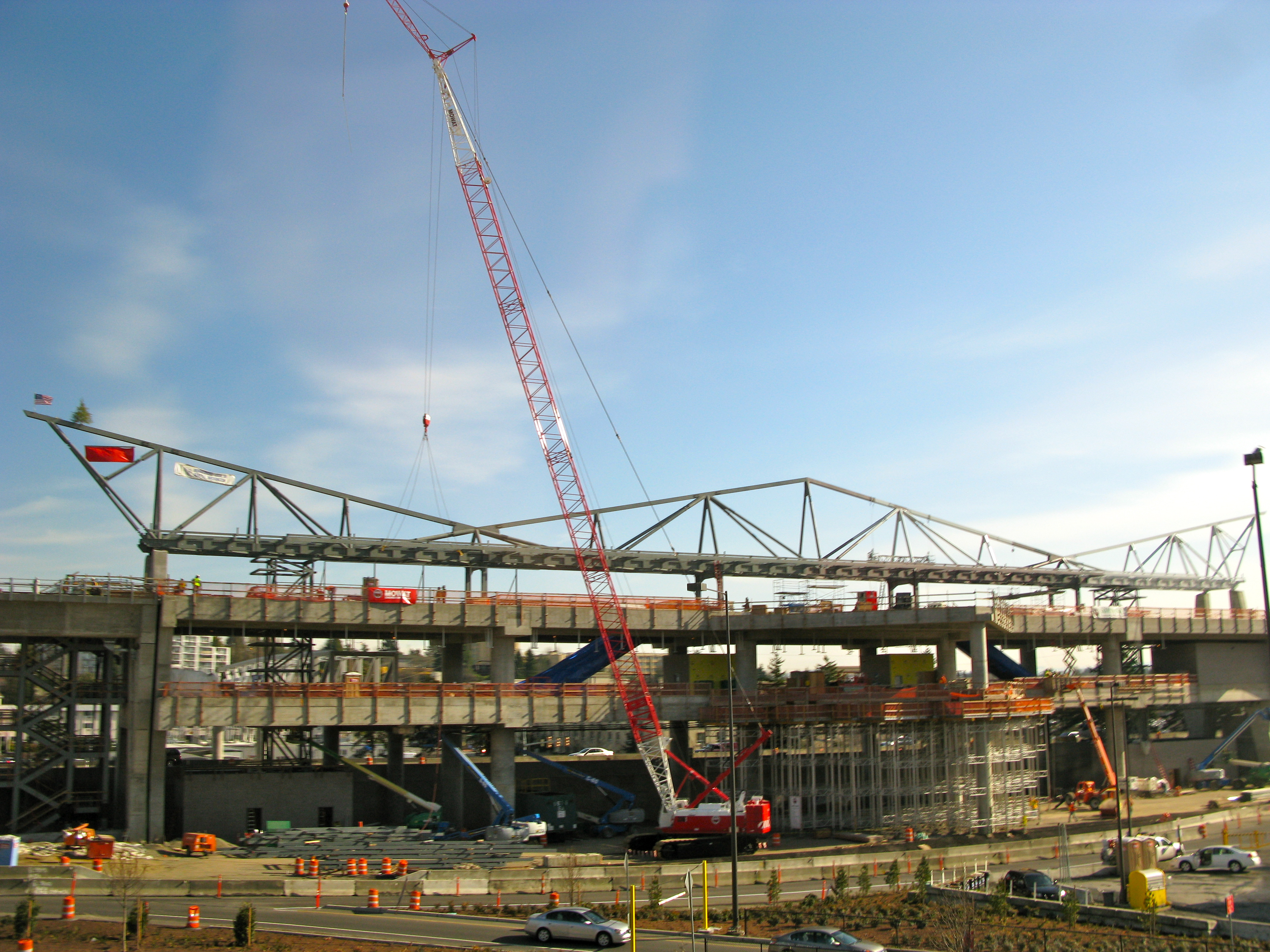
SeaTac/Airport station under construction in 2009

The Seattle–Tacoma International Airport was built in 1944 and began commercial service in 1947. During the airport's first major expansion in the 1960s, provisions were made to build facilities for "some form of rapid transit". The Port of Seattle, a government agency that operates the airport, studied a rapid transit system between downtown and the airport in the 1960s, but took no further action.

After the 1962 World's Fair and introduction of the Seattle Center Monorail, a proposal was drawn up by fair organizers to extend the system to the airport. The plan, supported by Governor Albert D. Rosellini, was ultimately rejected by incoming Governor Daniel J. Evans in favor of completing Interstate 5. The Forward Thrust rapid transit plan, which was rejected by voters in 1968 and 1970, included Sea-Tac Airport in its long-term plans for service; the airport was excluded from the first phase because of possible changes brought by airport expansion and the Supersonic Transport program.

The Municipality of Metropolitan Seattle (Metro) began operating bus service in King County in 1973, including regular bus service to the airport from Downtown Seattle on routes 174 and 194. A 1986 study from the Puget Sound Council of Governments and Metro recommended the construction of a light rail system between Federal Way and Lynnwood serving the airport and Downtown Seattle. A regional transit authority (RTA) was formed in the early 1990s to study a regional light rail system, first proposing a $6.7 billion plan in 1995 with service to Sea-Tac Airport via International Boulevard. The proposal was rejected by voters in March 1995, leading to a smaller, $3.9 billion proposal approved by voters the following year, with stations at the airport and South 200th Street.

The RTA, later renamed to Sound Transit, began planning the routing of the light rail line and placement of stations in 1998. Sound Transit and the Port of Seattle requested that the line be routed along International Boulevard to serve the airport's hotel area, while other officials from the city of SeaTac favored a station inside the current Sea-Tac Airport terminal to the west. Sound Transit selected their preferred route for the light rail line in 1999, choosing to serve the Port of Seattle's planned North End Airport Terminal, a multi-modal facility with a direct connection to the airport's Satellite Transit System, and a potential station at South 184th Street to serve the city center.

The light rail project exceeded its budget in 2001, leading to Sound Transit truncating the line at South 154th Street in Tukwila, 1 mile (1.6 km) north of the airport, where shuttle buses would pick up passengers headed for the airport terminal. Sound Transit adopted the new terminus in November 2001, allowing for construction to begin on the light rail system, while also authorizing a plan to extend light rail to the airport by 2009. The North End Airport Terminal, originally scheduled to open in 2002, was shelved after the September 11, 2001 attacks and subsequent fall in air travel. A new alignment along International Boulevard with a station on the east side of the airport's existing parking garage was proposed, but Sound Transit estimated that it would not have enough funds to extend light rail to the airport until 2015.

On January 15, 2003, Sound Transit and the Port of Seattle signed an agreement in principle to develop a plan for light rail expansion to the airport. The agreement envisioned a light rail station along International Boulevard near South 175th Street connected to the airport's terminal via the existing parking garage, with enhanced pedestrian connections and connections to a future hotel at the north end of the garage. The two agencies also agreed to work together on planning and engineering for the project, which would be built in conjunction with a realignment of the Airport Expressway. The plan was finalized in December 2004, with an agreement to accelerate planning and construction in time for a December 2009 opening, in time for the 2010 Winter Olympics held in nearby Vancouver, British Columbia.

The $244 million light rail extension, named "Airport Link" was approved by the Sound Transit Board on July 14, 2005, along with a motion adopting "SeaTac/Airport" as the name of the project's lone station. The agreement with the Port of Seattle relied on the addition of a third lane to State Route 518 in order to remove the return to terminal ramps at the airport, where the new light rail station would be built. In 2005, Southwest Airlines threatened to move to Boeing Field, leading the Port of Seattle to consider scrapping the necessary freeway improvements that would allow light rail tracks to be laid to the airport, jeopardizing the project. King County Executive Ron Sims rejected Southwest's proposal in October 2005, alongside an additional proposal from Alaska Airlines, and the Port resumed planning for light rail service. The Port of Seattle signed a memorandum of agreement with Sound Transit on April 11, 2006, approving the use of Port property for the project.

On September 22, 2006, Sound Transit and the Port of Seattle broke ground on the Airport Link extension, beginning three years of light rail and roadway construction. The airport's return-to-terminal ramps were closed for demolition in October, clearing the site of the future station. Construction of the SeaTac/Airport light rail station was bid out to Mowat Construction for $35.8 million in July 2007; the initial bid in March was set above Sound Transit's estimates at $95.3 million by Mowat, the sole bidder, and subsequently reduced the scope of the contract and removed elements of the station to bring costs down. A second contract signed with Mowat in February 2008 brought the total cost of the station's construction to $72 million. The 1.7-mile-long (2.7 km) light rail guideway approaching the station would be built by PCL Construction as $38 million addition to their contract to build the guideway in Tukwila.

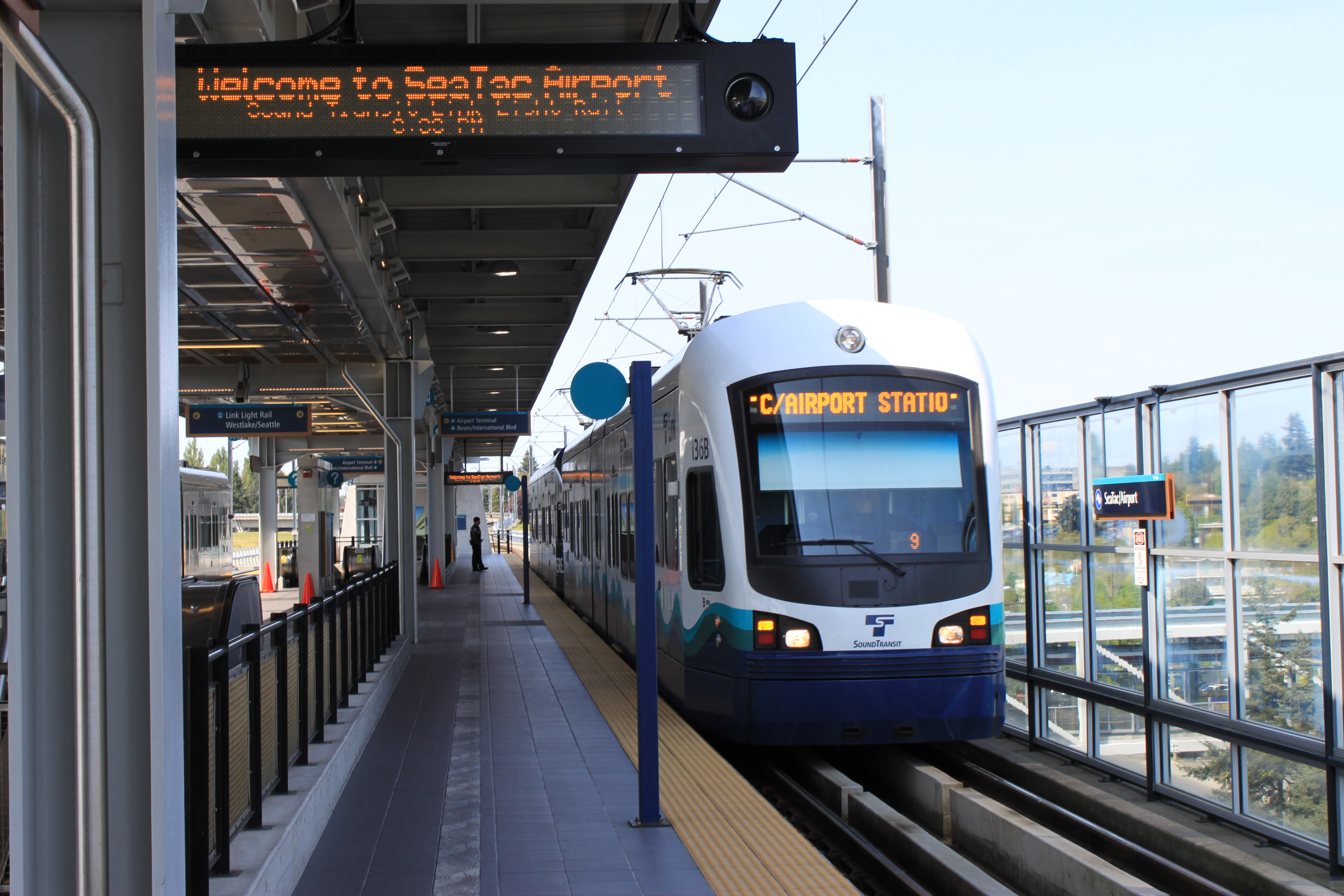
A Link train at the platform in 2015

Link light rail service from Downtown Seattle to Tukwila International Boulevard station began on July 18, 2009, accompanied by a temporary shuttle bus to bring passengers to the airport from Tukwila. SeaTac/Airport station opened to regular service on December 19, 2009, during a ribbon-cutting ceremony attended by 500 people, including U.S. Representative Jim McDermott of Seattle, Sound Transit Board Chair Greg Nickels and Port of Seattle Commissioner John Creighton. Initial ridership counts in January 2010 showed that the station increased light rail ridership by 2,000 passengers during its first month of service, coinciding with the holiday travel system. SeaTac/Airport station would serve as the southern terminus of the Link light rail system until the opening of Angle Lake station on September 24, 2016.

On January 28, 2017, amid protests at Sea-Tac Airport against the signing of Executive Order 13769 from President Donald Trump, the station was shut down by Sound Transit at the request of Port of Seattle security. The 30-minute shutdown was criticized by the media and King County Executive Dow Constantine as an attempt to hamper protesters' freedom of speech and right to free assembly. Service was resumed at the direction of Sound Transit CEO Peter Rogoff, and the following week Sound Transit and King County Metro formalized a new protocol requiring future requests from law enforcement to suspend service be approved by the CEO or general manager.

A second elevator at the east end of the pedestrian bridge over International Boulevard is planned to be constructed in early 2025.

== Station layout ==
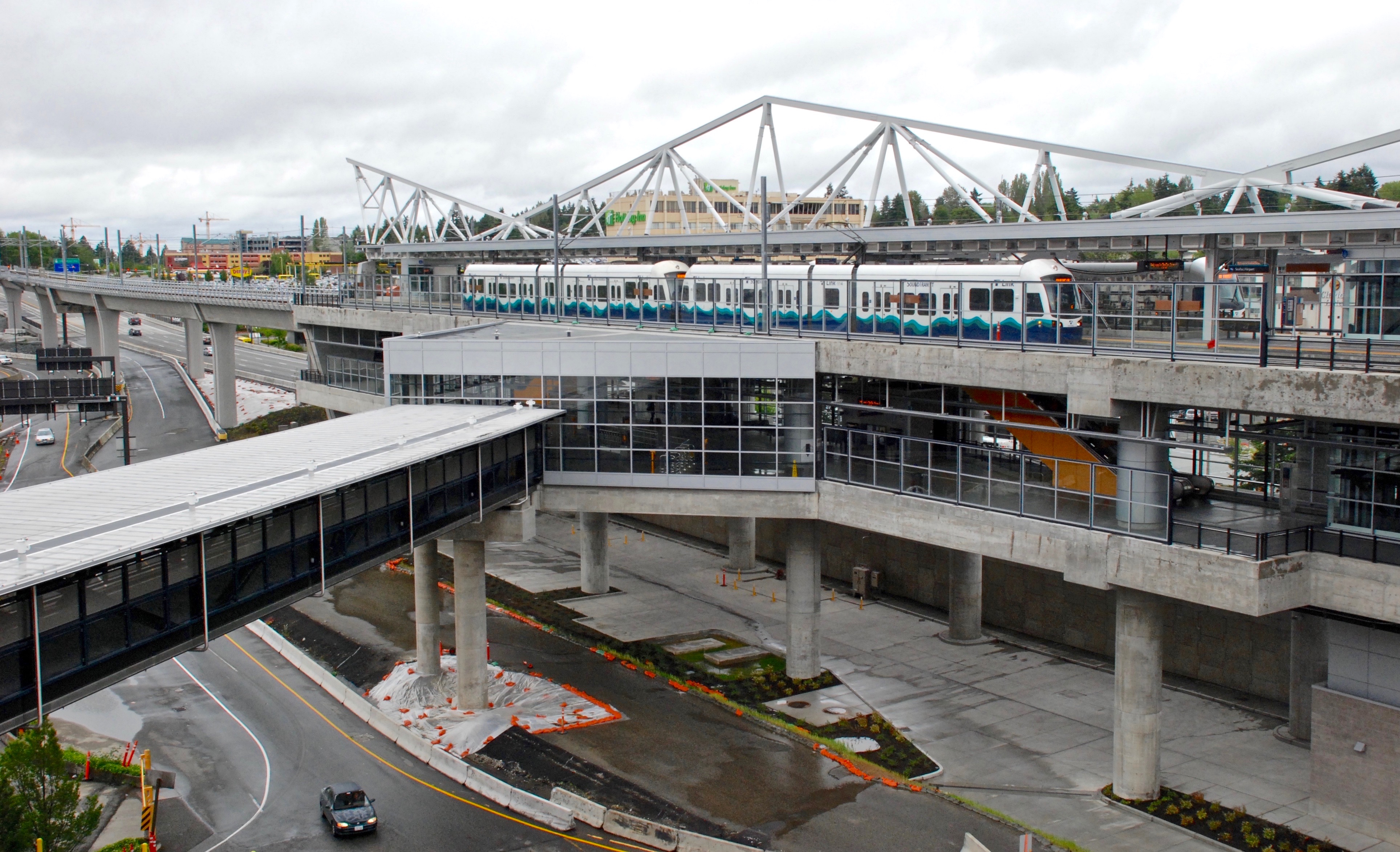
View of the station from the adjacent parking garage, showing the pedestrian bridge leading towards the airport's main terminal

SeaTac/Airport station consists of a single island platform elevated 60 feet (18 m), connected to a mezzanine level by a series of escalators and elevators. The station was designed by the architectural firm of David Hewitt and emphasizes a theme of flight. The roof features a series of steel trusses, similar in design to Tukwila International Boulevard station, that cover the platform and leave it unobstructed by support columns. At the mezzanine level are ticket vending machines, seating, public restrooms, a flight information screen, and a Smarte Carte dispenser for luggage carts. The mezzanine has connections to two pedestrian bridges: the west bridge connects to the fourth level of the airport parking garage, where a 1,200-foot (370 m) covered walkway leads to the main terminal; the east bridge crosses the Airport Expressway and leads to a plaza on International Boulevard with public art, a kiss and ride and a bus station. The station also has space for 24 bicycles in a secured locker.

Some elements of the station, including the size of internal support structures, the amount of glass panels, and the width of the roof, were eliminated or reduced to save $20 million in construction costs. A moving walkway to connect the station was considered and rejected because of engineering difficulties, including low ceilings in the garage and weight issues. In 2017, the Port of Seattle began a $3.5 million capital program to improve the walk from the station to the terminal by installing windscreens and adding a cart shuttle service. The cart shuttles carried up to 1,200 people per day in 2019; a self-driving shuttle with speeds limited to 4 miles per hour (6.4 km/h) launched as a pilot project in August 2025. The Port of Seattle's long-term master plan for the airport includes a new ground transportation center to replace part of the parking garage and include an indoor connection.

=== Art ===
SeaTac/Airport station also houses three art installations as part of the "STart" program, which allocates a percentage of project construction funds to art projects to be used in stations.

Werner Klotz's Flying Sails, a pair of abstract sails made of stainless steel, sits suspended above the escalators connecting the mezzanine to the platform. The 35-foot-tall (11 m) sails consist of wind-activated panels etched with the names of Northwest Native American tribes on the northern sails and cities around the globe at the same latitude or longitude as Seattle on the southern sails. Hanging above the east pedestrian bridge to International Boulevard is a 160-foot-long (49 m) steel truss. The piece, named Restless by Christian Moeller, has twelve rotating bird control spikes, inspired by the emergency water landing of US Airways Flight 1549 in 2009. Fernanda D'Agostino's Celestrial Navigation, a 18-foot-tall (5.5 m) glass and metal sculpture of a navigational quadrant, sits in the International Boulevard plaza. The piece sits on a pedestal of rustic terrazzo and features a looping, hour-long video projected to the quadrant.

The pictogram formerly assigned to the station depicted a magic carpet to represent the "magic, mystery and delight of flight" while also referencing the city of SeaTac's adopted slogan, the "Hospitality City". It was created by Christian French as part of the Stellar Connections series and its points represented nearby destinations, including the airport, civic buildings, Tyee High School, Angle Lake and Bow Lake Park. The pictogram series was retired in 2024 and replaced by station numbers.

== Services ==
SeaTac/Airport station is part of Sound Transit's 1 Line, which runs from between Lynnwood, the University of Washington campus, Downtown Seattle, the Rainier Valley, Seattle–Tacoma International Airport, and Federal Way. It is the twenty-first southbound station from Lynnwood City Center and fourth northbound station from Federal Way Downtown; SeaTac/Airport is situated south of Rainier Beach station. Trains serve the station twenty hours a day on weekdays and Saturdays, from 5:00 am to 1:00 am, and eighteen hours on Sundays, from 6:00 am to 12:00 am; during regular weekday service, trains operate roughly every eight to ten minutes during rush hour and midday operation, respectively, with longer headways of twelve to fifteen minutes in the early morning and at night. During weekends, Link trains arrive at SeaTac/Airport station every ten minutes during midday hours and every twelve to fifteen minutes during mornings and evenings. The station is approximately 69 minutes from Lynnwood City Center station, 37 minutes from Westlake station in Downtown Seattle, and 4 minutes from Angle Lake station. In 2025, an average of 10,118 passengers boarded Link trains at SeaTac/Airport station on weekdays.

The station is also served by five bus routes using a pair of bus stops on International Boulevard to the east of the station. King County Metro operates three routes from the station: the RapidRide A Line, which continues north to Tukwila International Boulevard station and south to Federal Way Transit Center; route 156, which connects to Southcenter Mall, Des Moines and Highline College; and route 161, which connects to Burien and Kent. Sound Transit Express route 560 serves the station and airport terminal; it travels to West Seattle, Burien, Renton, and Bellevue. A night bus from SeaTac/Airport station to Downtown Seattle and Pierce County operates at 30-minute frequencies during hours without Link service.
