= Victoria Fuller (artist) =

American artist

Victoria Barrett Fuller
- Global Garden Shovel, a 2010 public sculpture by Fuller, installed at Columbia City station in Seattle
- Born: May 13, 1953 (age 72); Allentown, Pennsylvania, U.S.
- Education: University of Denver; Regis University (BA); School of the Art Institute of Chicago (MFA)
- Known for: Sculptor, artist
- Website: victoriafullerart.com

Victoria Barrett Fuller (born May 13, 1953) is an American artist, sculptor, natural science illustrator, and award-winning singer, songwriter, and musician.

== Early life and education ==
Fuller was born in Allentown, Pennsylvania, and grew up on a farm and equestrian center in Catasauqua, Pennsylvania. She attended grade school at Moravian Preparatory School in Bethlehem, Pennsylvania, and graduated high school from Masters School in Dobbs Ferry, New York. She attended college at University of Denver, and then moved to Aspen, Colorado, where she received a BA degree through the UWW program at Regis University in Denver, Colorado while continuing to live in Aspen.

Fuller met and married fellow-artist Jack Bowers in Aspen in 1977 and divorced in 1980. While living in Aspen, Fuller studied at Anderson Ranch Art Center, and in 1983 was a "resident painting program recipient" and through the years has participated in workshops with Jim Dine, Terry Allen, Red Grooms, Roger Brown, Robert Mangold, Sylvia Plimack Mangold, Lucas Johnson, James Surls, Alexis Rockman, and was an assistant to visiting artist Deborah Butterfield assembling a horse sculpture from scavenged wood in 1985. In the 1980s, Fuller also attended the Parsons Paris program in Paris. While working towards her undergraduate degree, Fuller attended the San Francisco Art Institute for two semesters in 1980. In 1984, Fuller moved to New York City and had a show of her work at Westbroadway Gallery, and was in subsequent shows at M-13 and White Columns. She rented an art studio space in the Tribeca neighborhood. During this time Fuller exchanged apartments for one year with auto racing legend Janet Guthrie, who lived in Fuller's apartment in Aspen, hile writing her autobiography, and Fuller lived in hers while pursuing her career in New York.

Fuller moved to Chicago in 1992 to study at the School of the Art Institute of Chicago, in Chicago, Illinois, and received an MFA degree in 1994. Graduate advisors were artists Michiko Itatani, as well as Chicago Imagists Jim Nutt and Barbara Rossi.

== Career ==
Fuller works in a variety of media, including painting, sculpture, and installation art. Her work during the 1980s shows a tendency towards pop cartoon-like imagery on shaped canvas, later incorporating appropriated objects. Her work from 1990 to 2010 involves the usage of industrial fabricated materials and geometric forms while combining common everyday objects. The work recalls 1960's minimalism and borrows from the spirit of 1960's pop art and 20th century surrealism. Pop artists such as Claes Oldenburg are acknowledged influences. Fuller's work finds inspiration from natural and man-made forms, and is often concerned with finding the correlations between the two, while addressing issues of social concepts, popular culture, and perception. According to Lanny Silverman, Curator of Exhibitions Chicago Cultural Center Department of Cultural Affairs, "Fuller utilizes manufactured components that are part and parcel of the modern industrial age [...] and reveals a facet of our consumer culture. Fuller's strategy is to liberate these objects from their everyday functions by combining them in whacky configurations that tease us with some sense of use." Amongst her body of work is the large-scale public sculpture, "Shoe of Shoes", in St. Louis, Missouri, a large high-heeled woman's shoe made from approximately 2,000 cast aluminum shoes, and her 35-foot tall Bronze sculpture, "Global Garden Shovel", in Seattle, Washington.

=== Exhibitions ===
Fuller has received four solo shows, including exhibits at the Paint Creek Center for the Arts entitled “Extraordinary Ordinary” in Michigan in 1998 and at the Chicago Cultural Center, titled "The Emancipation of the Common Object" in 2001.

Fuller's work is included in group shows, including, in 2011, Recycled, Reclaimed, Repurposed in the Willis Tower lobby and The Department of Cultural Affairs presents CSI on the Boulevard. In 2010, Fuller's work was featured in exhibits such as Sculpture Invasion 2010 at Koehline Museum of art in Des Plaines, Illinois, and an outdoor sculpture show Countercurrents at Art Chicago in Merchandise Mart in Chicago. The same year, Fuller was commissioned to contribute to Comed's public display “Fine Art Fridges” in Chicago. The resulting work, Peas and Quiet, is now on exhibit at the Discovery Center Museum in Rockford, Illinois.

Other notable shows include “Species Affected by Global Warming” at the Peggy Notebaert Nature Museum in Chicago in 2009, a 3-person show with Robert H. Hudson and Gordon Powell at the Sears Tower in 2009, “Krasl Biennial Sculpture Invitational” at the Krasl Art Center in St. Joseph, Michigan, in 2006, “Formed to Function” at the John Michael Kohler Arts Center in Sheboygan, Wisconsin, in 2003, “Pierwalk” at Navy Pier in Chicago in 2002 and 1999, and exhibits at Rockford Art Museum and Evanston Art Center in 2000. That same year, the sculpture Shoe of Shoes was featured in “The Really Big Shoe Show” at the City Museum in St. Louis. Shoes has since been acquired by Brown Shoe Company in Clayton, Missouri, and is on public view outside the entrance to their corporate offices.

Fuller's work has been acquired and commissioned by several institutions, including Sound Transit in Seattle, Allentown Art Museum in Allentown, Pennsylvania, Mind Inc. in Garrison, New York, Burrell Communications in Chicago, ESPN Zone in Chicago, and Bi-State Development Agency in St. Louis.

=== Music ===
In addition to being a contemporary visual artist, Fuller is also a singer songwriter. Victoria's sound is a hybrid of alternative rock, pop, jazz, and blues. In her debut CD, Small Moments, produced by Danny Shaffer, she is accompanied by such artists as Grammy winner Scott Bennett, who tours and records with Beach Boys legend Brian Wilson, and Jeff Jacobs, who has performed with Billy Joel and as a touring member of Foreigner. In 2006, “Small Moments” was released in physical form, and digitally on iTunes. Fuller's band is called Victoria Fuller and The Brushmen.

In 2008, Fuller received a nomination from The Independent Singer Songwriter Association for her song "Barcelona Nights" in the Jazz Category and an Honorable Mention from the Mid Atlantic Song Contest. She received Honorable Mention awards in the 2007 11th Annual Unisong Songwriting Contest, and in the 2006 Singer/Songwriter Awards. Also another Honorable Mention award was given by the 2005 Billboard (magazine) song contest. Her songs have been played on Richard Milne's 93.1 WXRT-FM Local Anesthetic show, the UIC radio “Hidden Treasures” show, hosted by DJ John Rose, Songwriter's Network, and on WGN Radio on Rick Kogan's “Sunday Papers” Show, WZRD (Northeastern Illinois University) radio, iTunes, CD baby, ReverbNation.com, and Rhapsody.

== Awards ==
In 1986, Fuller received the Creative Fellowship Award from the Colorado Council on the Arts and Humanities. In 2000, she received a Fellowship Award from the Illinois Arts Council, a “Best of 3D” award from a juried exhibition at the Rockford Art Museum, and a “Juror’s Award” from a Biennial Exhibition at the Evanston Art Center. More recently, Fuller has received the CAAP Grant from the Illinois Arts Council.

== Publications and media ==
Reviews and articles about her work have appeared in the Western Arts and Architecture, New York Daily News, Manhattan Arts, Cover Magazine, Chicago Tribune, Chicago Sun Times, New York Post, TWA's Ambassador Magazine, and on NBC, CBS, ABC stations in Chicago, and Fox news in St. Louis.
