= NewHolly, Seattle =

Neighborhood of Seattle, Washington, US

Coordinates: 47°32′21″N 122°17′13″W

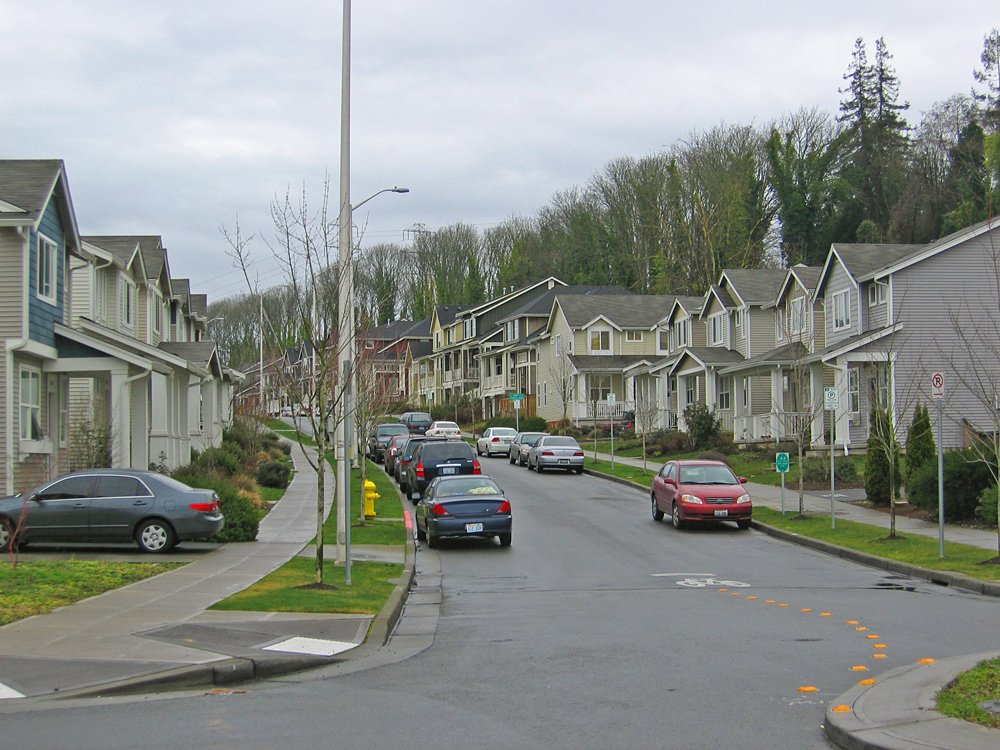
Residential section of NewHolly

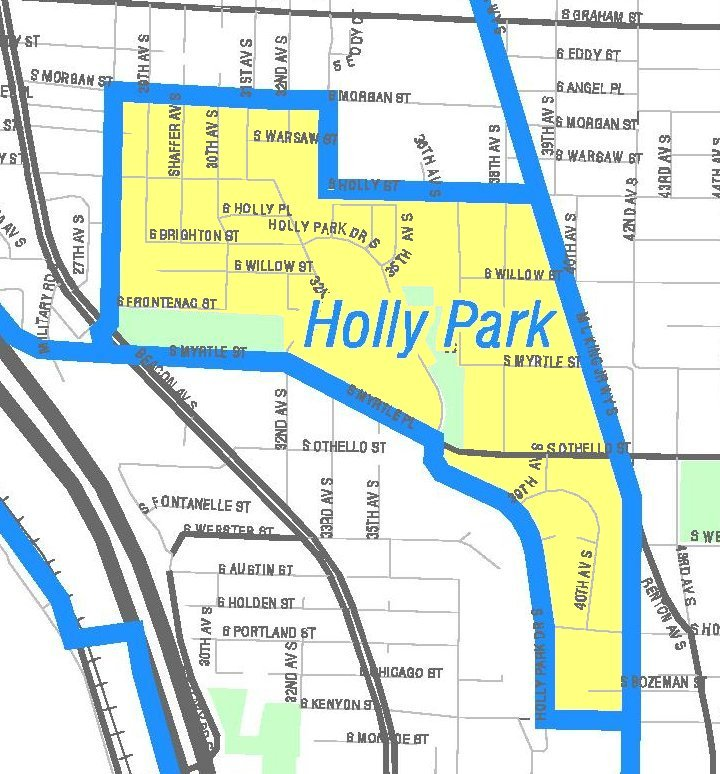
Unofficial map of Holly Park as defined by the City Clerk's Seattle Neighborhood Atlas

NewHolly (formerly Holly Park) is a neighborhood in southeastern Seattle, Washington, United States. It is part of Seattle's South End.

Holly Park was built in the 1940s to house defense workers and veterans, but in the 1950s, it was converted into public housing under the aegis of the Seattle Housing Authority (SHA). As the mid-century style of low-income housing projects fell out of fashion, and with its housing stock not faring well over the decades, SHA decided in 1995 to rebuild Holly Park as a mixed-income neighborhood. The resulting neighborhood is now officially NewHolly, described by the SHA as "the first new neighborhood in Seattle in 50 years."

NewHolly consists primarily of housing, but also includes a learning center; a branch of Seattle Public Library; several classrooms attached to South Seattle College; a Head Start preschool; child care, youth, family, and teen programs; and community building activities and employment programs intended to help residents obtain and secure living-wage jobs.

South Seattle College's NewHolly Learning Center teaches ESL and family literacy, ABE/GED preparation, and a worker retraining program associated with Community Corrections and Protective Service.
