= Market rate =

Usual price charged for a good or service in a free market

The market rate (or "going rate") for goods or services is the usual price charged for them in a free market. If demand goes up, manufacturers and laborers will tend to respond by increasing the price they require, thus setting a higher market rate. When demand falls, market rates also tend to fall (see Supply and demand).

== See also ==
- Interest
- Market price
