= Columbia City, Seattle =

Coordinates: 47°33′39″N 122°17′13″W

Columbia City
- Seattle Neighborhood
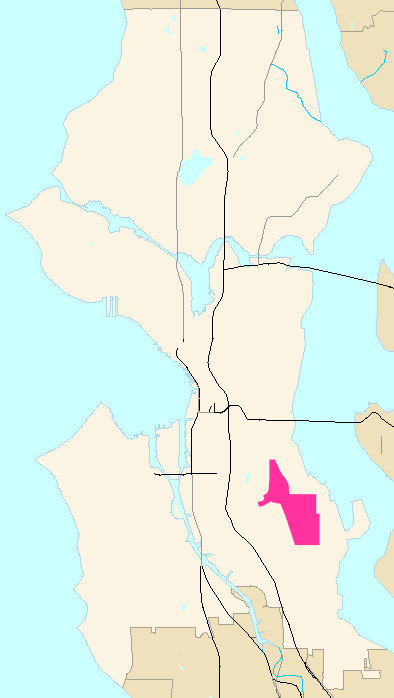
- Map of Columbia City's location in Seattle
- Country: United States
- State: Washington
- City: Seattle
- City Council: District 2
- Neighborhood Council: Southeast District
- Police District: South Precinct, R3
- Established: Incorporated in 1893 and Annexed to Seattle in 1907
- Founder: J. K. Edmiston
- Named for: Christopher Columbus

Population
  - Total: 13,031
- ZIP code: 98118

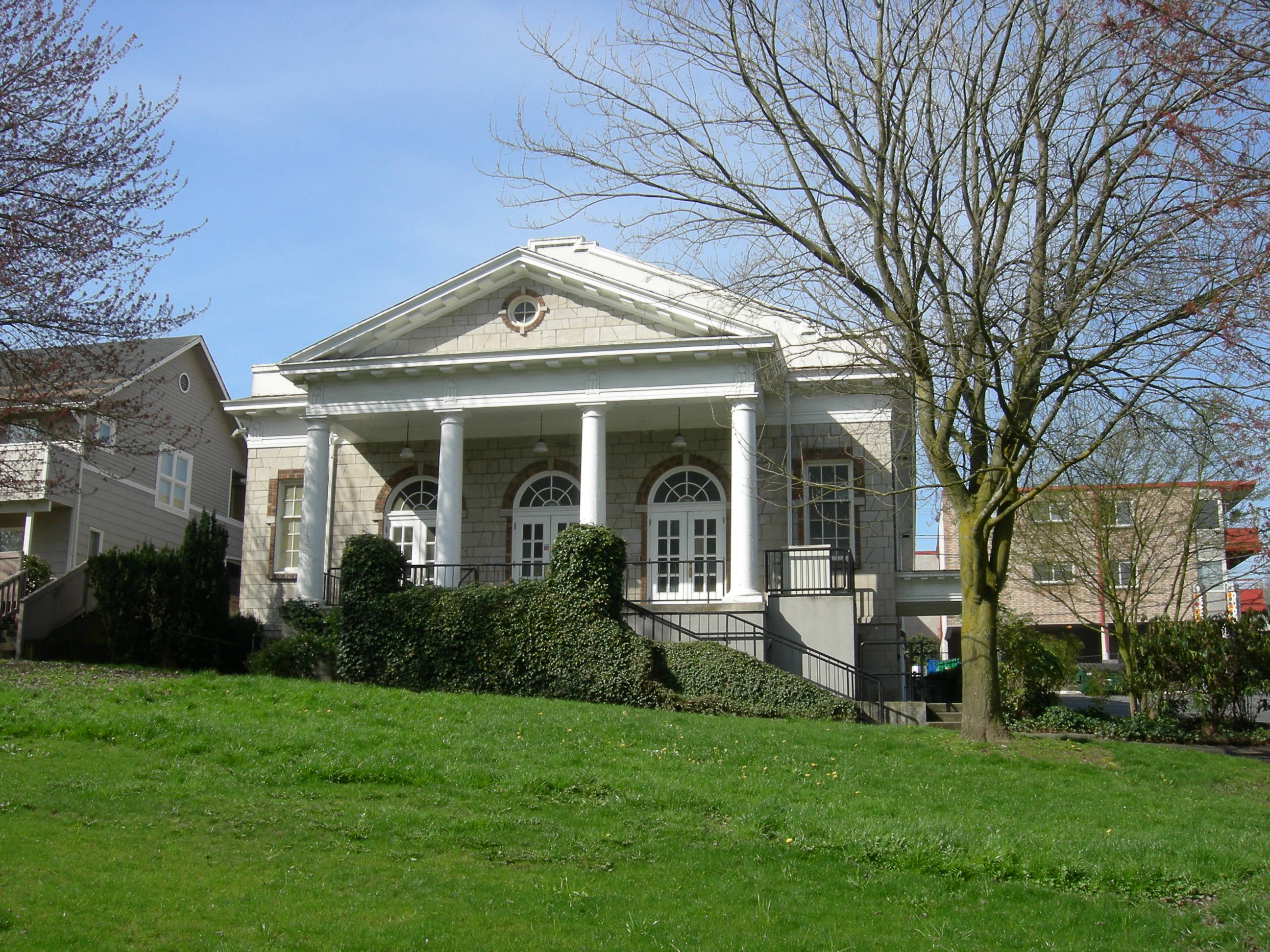
Rainier Arts Center seen from Columbia Park. The center is a former Christian Science church, built 1921.

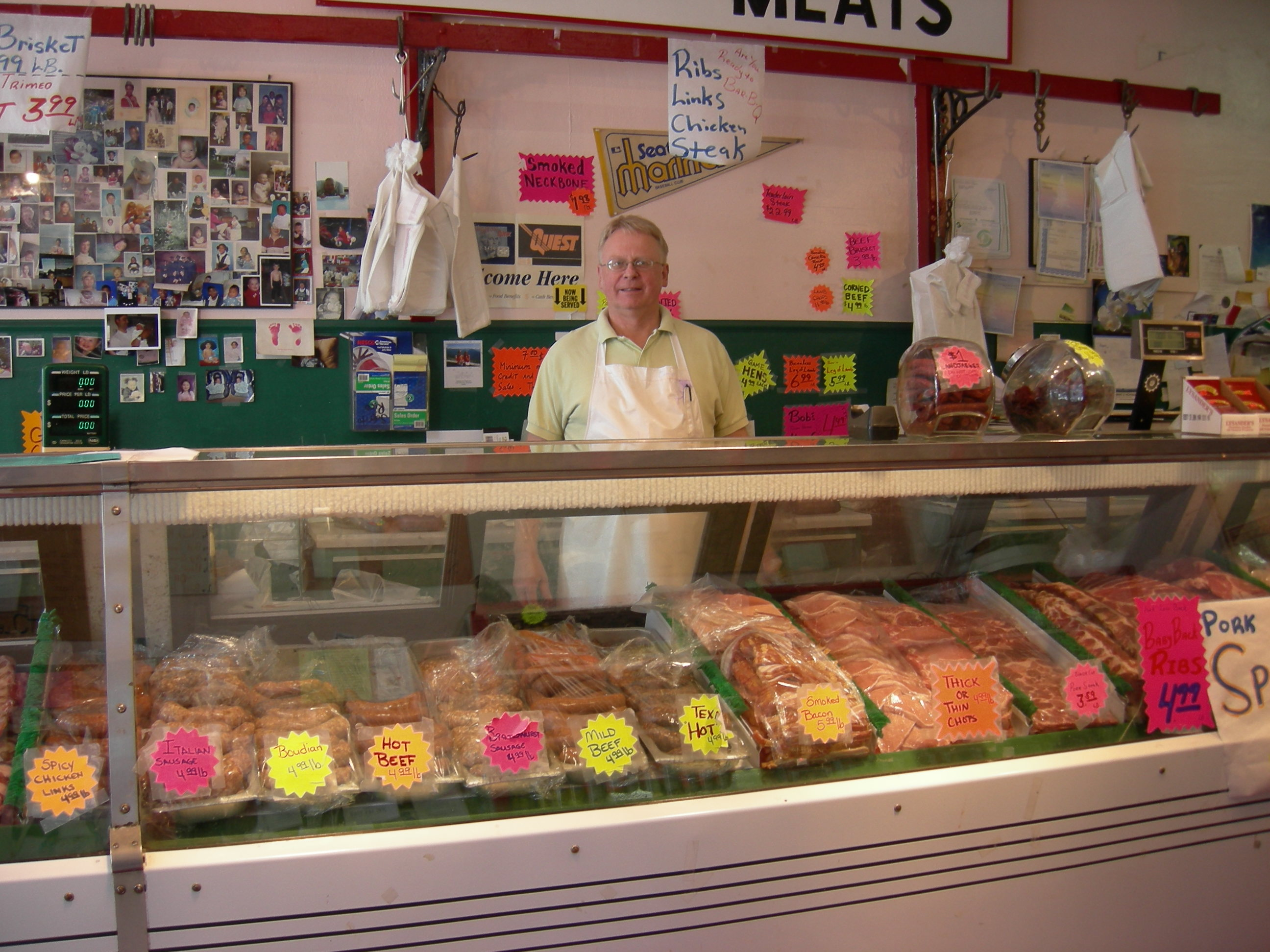
Butcher shop, Columbia City, 2007

Columbia City is a neighborhood in southeastern Seattle, Washington, within the city's Rainier Valley district. It has a landmark-protected historic business district and is one of the few Seattle neighborhoods with a long history of ethnic and income diversity.

The neighborhood's main thoroughfares running north–south are Rainier Avenue S. and Martin Luther King Jr. Way S. The principal east–west thoroughfares are S. Alaska Street, S Orcas Street, and S. Genesee Street. Mass transit includes Sound Transit's Central Link light rail service from the Columbia City station (approx. 15 minutes to downtown Seattle and 20 minutes to SeaTac airport).

== History ==
=== Founding and early years ===
The area was once dense conifer forest, primarily inhabited by Coast Salish peoples, until the arrival of the Rainier Valley Electric Railway from Downtown Seattle in 1891. Owners of the electric railway bought forty acres, built a lumber mill, cleared the area for settlement, and promoted their town development under the name "Columbia" – named after Christopher Columbus. Three streets in the neighborhood have names of other famous explorers (a Columbia Street already existed Downtown): Ferdinand Street after Magellan, Hudson Street after Henry Hudson, and Americus Street after Amerigo Vespucci. Lots in 1891 were sold under a canvas tent with the slogan "Columbia, Watch It Grow!" attached to the railway cars.

Columbia incorporated as "Columbia City" in January 1893. Annexation to the City of Seattle came May 3, 1907 following a petition by citizens to the City Council to hold a special election on the matter. Although opposition to annexation had initially been strong due to citizens' desire for local control, the March 5 vote was overwhelming: 109-3 in favor of annexation to Seattle.

In 1905, the newly renamed Seattle Renton & Southern Railway extended south to Renton. In 1912 the streetcar line went bankrupt and was reorganized as the Seattle & Rainier Valley Railway. Its last run was just after midnight on January 1, 1937. Meanwhile, Columbia City's ambitions to become a seaport were thwarted with the completion of the Lake Washington Ship Canal in 1917, which lowered Lake Washington by nine feet and caused Wetmore Slough to dry up. The former slough was used as a dump from 1941 to 1963, and is now Genesee Park.

A major early employer was the Hitt Fireworks Company (1905–1960s) located at what is now Hitt's Hill Park. It employed 200 workers in the 1930s and was credited for firework displays at several world's fairs and Fourth of July celebrations. During World War II it produced smoke screens and parachute flares. The Hitt Fireworks Company also provided pyrotechnic effects for some major release films including Gone with the Wind.

=== 1960s–present ===
As African Americans moved to Seattle to be part of the wartime industrial boom, many settled in the area, and in the 1960s the area began to suffer the effects of redlining and racism. By the 1970s, the neighborhood had fallen victim to poverty, housing stock had deteriorated, and many storefronts along Rainier Avenue S. were vacant.

The Columbia City business district was added to the National Register of Historic Places in 1980 as the Columbia City Historic District, extending north to S. Alaska Street, south to the intersection of 39th Ave S and Rainier Ave S, east to 39th Ave S., and west to the alley east of 35th Ave S.

Beginning in the late 1980s, Columbia City saw a large influx of minority professionals, artists, gay and lesbian couples and "urban pioneers" seeking classic housing stock at low prices. By the late 1990s, Columbia City was already referred to as one of Seattle's most creative neighborhoods. In the last decade, it has seen some of the sharpest rises in property values in the entire Seattle metropolitan area. The result has been widespread gentrification, including the restoration of many of the older homes and, in the last several years, the building of numerous condos and the planned construction of several hundred more. As of 2008, Columbia City is one of Seattle's most diverse neighborhoods in terms of income and ethnicity, encompassing everything from public housing to multimillion-dollar view homes.

== Neighborhood character ==
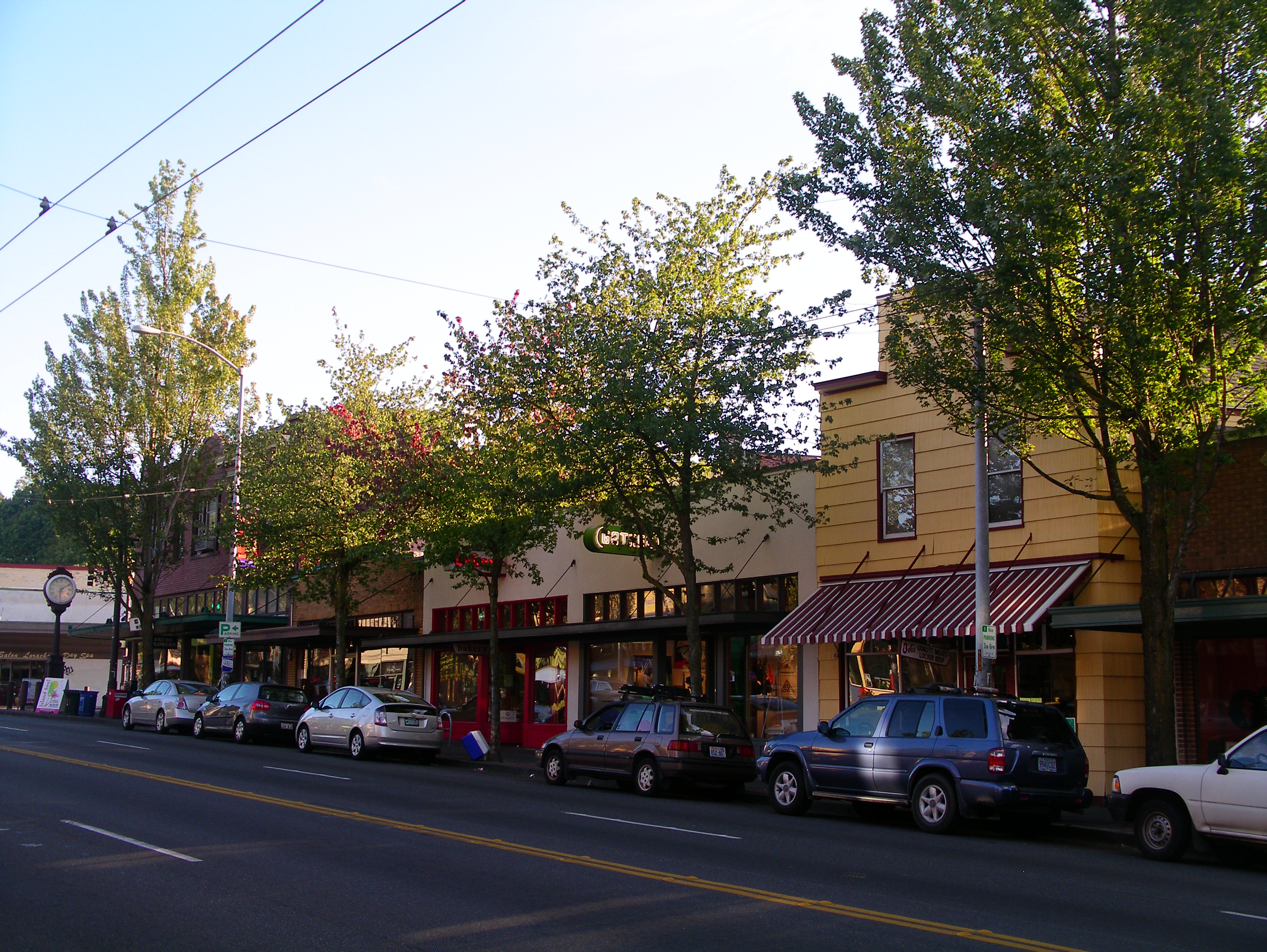
Rainier Avenue in Columbia City

Today, the pedestrian business district along Rainier Avenue S. is home to six bars, a grocery store, a number of restaurants, bakeries, coffee shops, assorted retail, an art gallery, fitness facilities, a clubhouse, movie theater, and multiple live music venues.

Housing stock include craftsman bungalows, a mix of market-rate and low-income apartment buildings, and townhome developments. Community estimates have put the number of new homes in the planning pipeline as numbering at least 1,500. Many of these developments are in formerly vacant lots.

Train service at the neighborhood's Link Light Rail station began in July 2009, connecting the neighborhood to both SeaTac airport and Downtown Seattle. Rainier Vista, once a post-war suburban public housing project, has been redeveloped into a mixed-use, mixed income community built around the light rail station, and includes more than 900 new homes (some subsidized, some rental, some owner-occupied).

=== Community organizations ===
Bike Works is a community charity that lets kids earn bikes by learning to repair them. The Boys and Girls Club has opened a new regional facility in the neighborhood. The neighborhood's large Genesee Park and Playfield is also the site of the Rainier Valley Community Center. The Rainier Arts Center and Southside Commons on either sides of Columbia Park are spaces for arts and cultural events. The Rainier Valley Historical Society documents and interprets the history of the larger district. The SouthEast Economic Development organization operates a number of affordable housing units and supports economic development and the arts, including Columbia City Gallery and the Rainier Arts Center, in the district.

=== Festivals and events ===
The Rainier Valley Heritage Parade and Summer Streets Party happens in August. Beatwalk is a live music series on the streets and in business within the Historic District, happening on second Sundays of June through September. A farmer's market operates May to mid-October along S Edmunds St with many in the neighborhood gathering for a dinner picnic in adjacent Columbia Park. HONK! Fest West happens the first weekend of June each year. HONK! Fest West is an accessible community music festival driven by the energetic performances of street bands in public spaces.

== Registered historic places ==
The following structures in Columbia City are listed on the National Register of Historic Places:

Columbia City Historic District (Seattle, Washington)	Extends north to S. Alaska Street, south to the intersection of 39th Ave S and Rainier Ave S, east to 39th Ave S., and west to the alley east of 35th Ave S (Added in 1980, ID #80004000)
Seattle Public Library - Columbia City Branch	Carnegie-funded library built in 1915. Situated in Columbia Park at 4721 Rainier Avenue S (Added in 1982, ID #82004909)
