= Seattle Housing Authority =

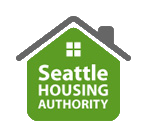

Low income housing agency overview
- Formed: 1939; 86 years ago
- Jurisdiction: Seattle
- Headquarters: 101 Elliott Avenue West, Seattle, WA; 47°37′10.092″N 122°21′22.953″W
- Website: seattlehousing.org

Seattle Housing Authority is an independent public corporation in the city of Seattle, Washington, responsible for public housing for low-income, elderly, and disabled residents. SHA serves more than 25,500 people, just under a third of whom are children, through around 5,200 HUD units, 1,000 units for the elderly and disabled, and 800 additional units that receive local funding. SHA is also the local administrator for Section 8 housing. It is run by a seven-member Board of Commissioners appointed by the mayor.

One of SHA's most notable properties is Yesler Terrace, which at the time of its completion in 1941 was Washington's first public housing development and the first racially integrated public housing development in the United States. Keeping with its efforts to diversify, the SHA created the Scattered Site program in 1978. This program has currently established 800 small-scale public housing units in diverse neighborhoods throughout the city.

== Housing Developments ==
- NewHolly (1940s, redeveloped in 1995)
- Rainier Vista (2005)
- Yesler Terrace (1941, redeveloped in 2010s)
