= Genesee Park (Seattle) =

Park in Seattle, Washington, United States

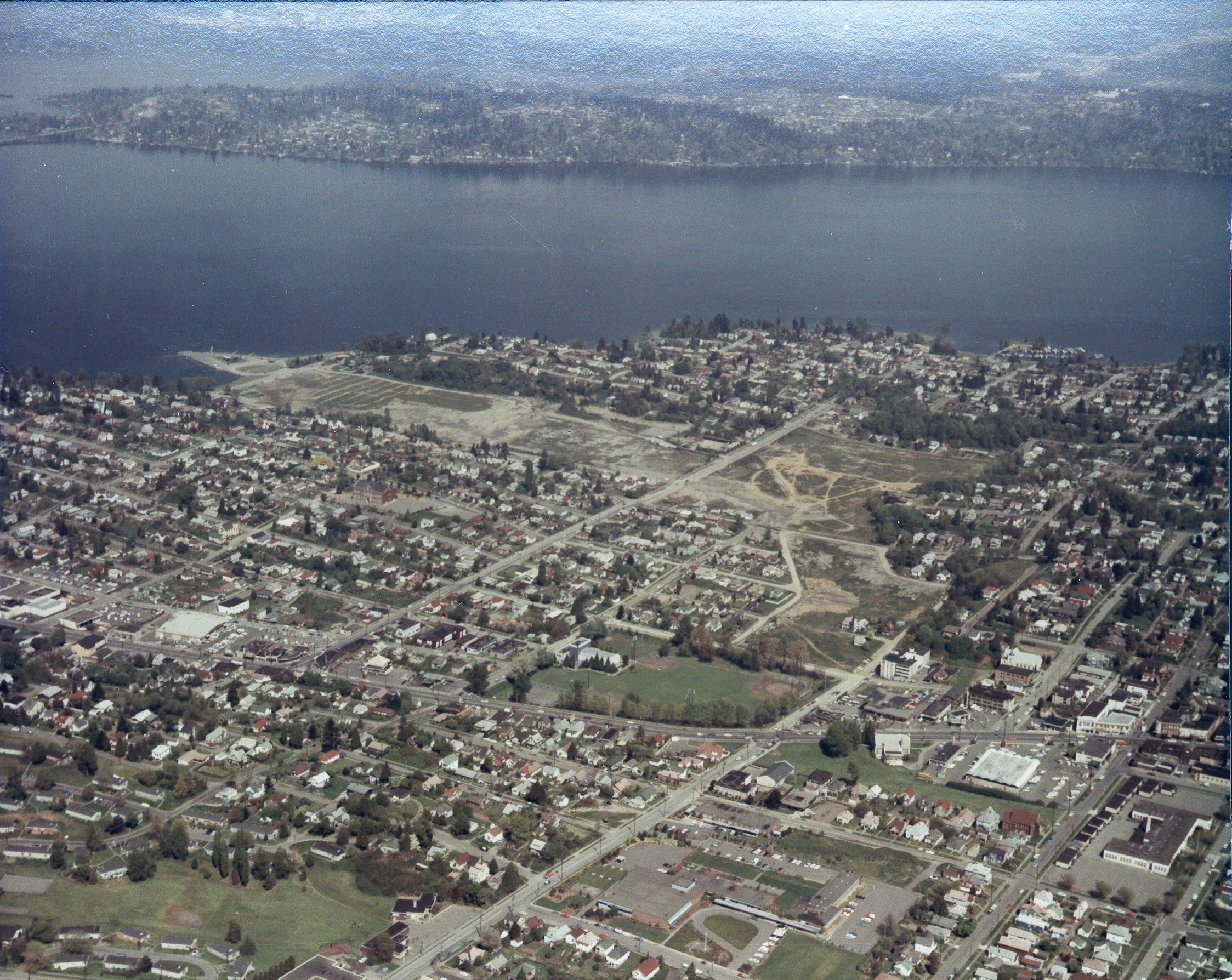
- A 1970 aerial view of Genesee Park
- Interactive map of Genesee Park
- Type: Urban Park
- Location: Seattle, Washington
- Coordinates: 47°33′50.76″N 122°16′44.4″W
- Area: 57.7 acres (234,000 m^{2})
- Established: 1968; 58 years ago
- Operated by: Seattle Parks and Recreation

Wetmore Slough in 1920

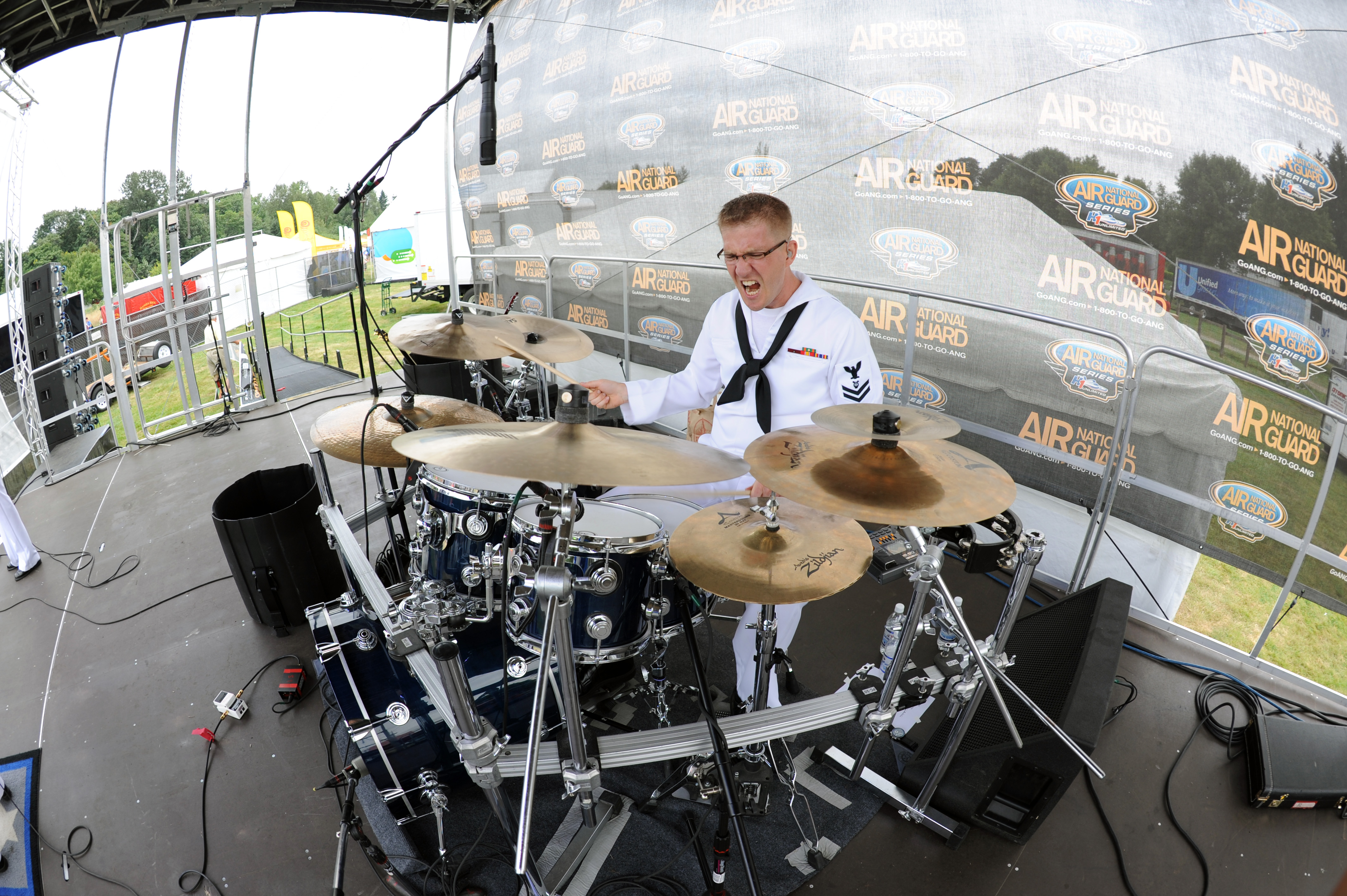
A U.S. Navy musician performs a drum solo at Genesee Park during the 62nd annual Seattle Seafair Fleet Week

Genesee Park is a 57.7-acre (0.234 km^{2}) park in the Rainier Valley neighborhood of Seattle, Washington. A waterway, Wetmore Slough, before the lowering of Lake Washington by nine feet in 1917 as part of the construction of the Lake Washington Ship Canal, it was purchased by the city in 1947 and used as a dump until 1963. Development of the park began in 1968. It hosts the hydroplane races and aerobatics air show during the annual Seafair, in July–August.

The L-shape park is bordered to the north by Lake Washington and the Stan Sayres Memorial Park/Mount Baker Rowing and Sailing Center, the south by a ridge inline with S. Alaska St., the east by 46th Ave. S. and the west by 43rd Ave. S. along its northern segment and 38th Ave. S. along its southern segment, with its namesake, S. Genesee St., traveling east–west through the middle of it.

In the 1990s the Rainier Community Center was relocated across the street, from its previous home, onto Genesee Park at its westernmost edge.

The park features a nature trail/wild bird habitat plus a large picnic shelter and open grass area on its northern segment, a sand upper-field for soccer plus an artificial turf lower-field for soccer and football along with a fenced-in dog park through its central segment, a circular walkabout in its southwest segment, and three child play areas (one north of S. Genesee St. at 44th Ave. S., one south of S. Genesee St. at 43rd Ave. S. and one at the Rainier Community Center).

The two sports fields located just south of S. Genesee St. are equipped with stadium light poles to illuminate the field into the night as needed.

During the first week of August, Genesee Park serves as the main entrance to hydroplane races and aerobatics air show festivities, part of Seattle's summer celebration known as Seafair, dating back to the 1950s.
