= Beacon Hill Station =

Beacon Hill Station can refer to:

- Beacon Hill station (Sound Transit), a light rail station in Seattle, Washington, United States
- Beacon Hill transmitting station, a telecommunications facility located on Beacon Hill in Devon, England, UK
