= Beacon Hill Tunnel =

Beacon Hill Tunnel may refer to one of the following:

- Beacon Hill Tunnel (Hong Kong)
- Beacon Hill tunnel (Seattle)
- Beacon Hill Tunnel (South Africa)
