= 1 Line (Sound Transit) =

Light rail line serving Seattle, Washington

- Link light rail logo
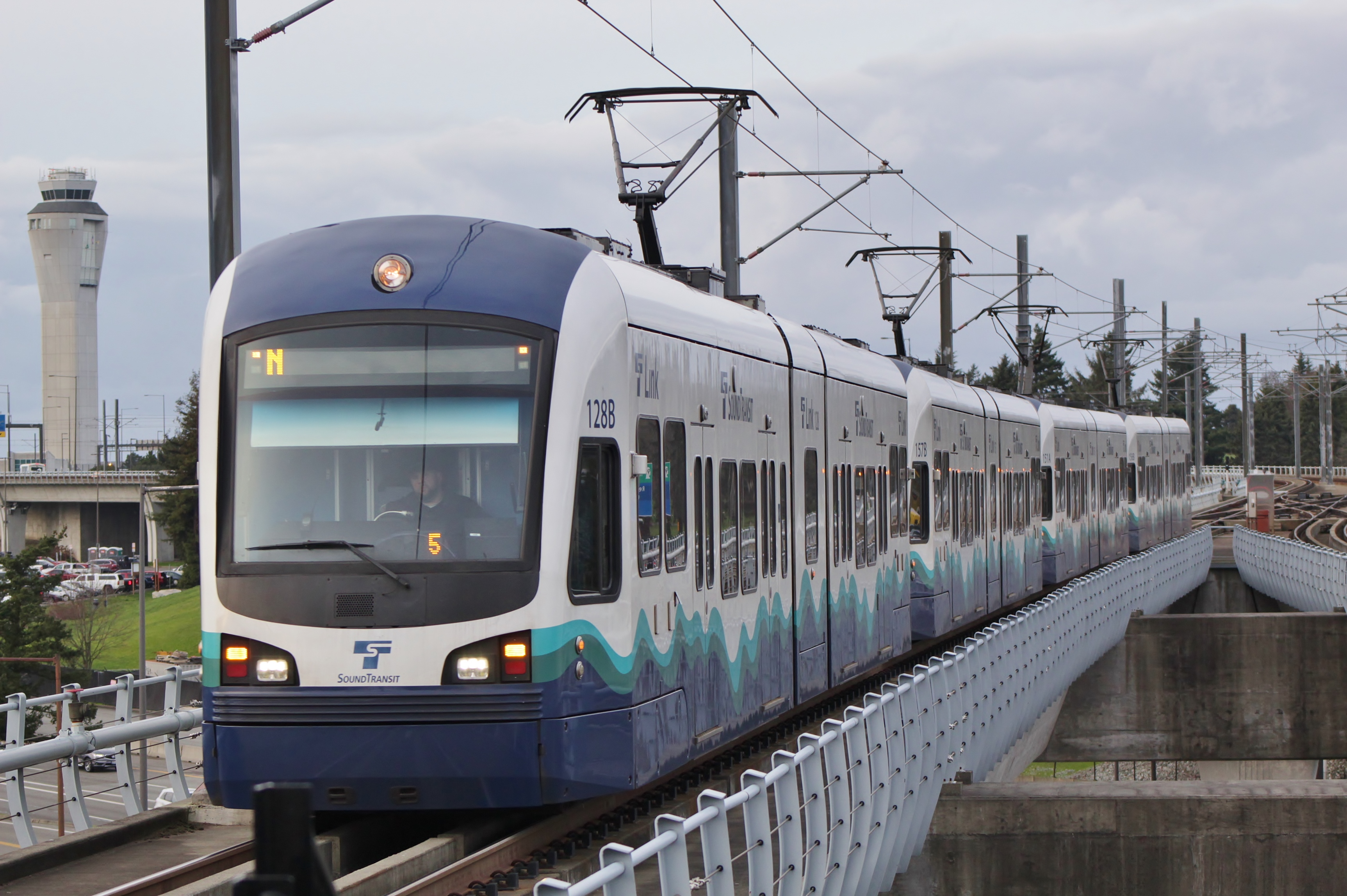
- A four-car Series 1 train on the 1 Line approaching SeaTac/Airport station

Overview
- Other name: Central Link
- Owner: Sound Transit
- Locale: Seattle, Washington, U.S.
- Termini: Lynnwood City Center (north); Federal Way Downtown (south)
- Stations: 27
- Website: soundtransit.org

Service
- Type: Light rail
- System: Link light rail
- Operator: King County Metro
- Rolling stock: 62 Kinkisharyo-Mitsui LRVs; 152 Siemens S700s
- Daily ridership: 102,895 (2025, weekdays)
- Ridership: 35,564,496 (2025)

History
- Opened: July 18, 2009

Technical
- Line length: 40.95 mi (65.90 km)
- Number of tracks: 2
- Character: At grade, elevated, and underground
- Track gauge: 4 ft 8 1/2 in (1,435 mm) standard gauge
- Electrification: Overhead line, 1,500 V DC
- Operating speed: 55 mph (89 km/h)

The 1 Line, formerly Central Link, is a light rail line in Seattle, Washington, United States, and part of Sound Transit's Link light rail system. It serves 27 stations in King and Snohomish counties, traveling 41 miles (66 km) between Lynnwood City Center and Federal Way Downtown stations. The line connects Lynnwood, Mountlake Terrace, Shoreline, the University District, Downtown Seattle, the Rainier Valley, Seattle–Tacoma International Airport, Kent, Des Moines, and Federal Way. The 1 Line carried over 35.5 million total passengers in 2025, with an average of nearly 103,000 daily passengers on weekdays. It runs for 20 hours per day on weekdays and Saturdays, with headways as low as six minutes during peak hours, and reduced 18-hour service on Sundays and holidays.

Trains are typically composed of three or four cars that each can carry 194 passengers, including 74 in seats, along with wheelchairs and bicycles. Fares are paid through the regional ORCA card, paper tickets, or a mobile app. Sound Transit uses proof-of-payment to verify passenger fares, employing fare ambassadors and transit police to conduct random inspections. Until August 2024, fares were calculated based on distance traveled. All stations have ticket vending machines, public art, bicycle parking, and bus connections, while several also have park-and-ride lots. Stations between Lynnwood and Seattle are shared with the 2 Line, which serves the Eastside region of King County.

Voters approved Central Link in a 1996 ballot measure and construction began in 2003, after the project was reorganized under a new budget and truncated route in response to higher than expected costs. The light rail line, which followed decades of failed transit plans for the Seattle region, opened on July 18, 2009, terminating at Westlake in the Downtown Seattle Transit Tunnel and Tukwila International Boulevard near Sea–Tac Airport. It was extended south to SeaTac/Airport in December 2009, north to the University of Washington in March 2016, and south to Angle Lake in September 2016. The line was temporarily renamed the Red Line until its designation was changed to the 1 Line in 2021, coinciding with an extension to Northgate.

The first cross-county extension, north to Lynnwood, opened in August 2024; it was followed by a southern extension to Federal Way that opened in December 2025. The 2 Line began interlined service with the 1 Line between Lynnwood and Downtown Seattle in February 2026 and fully opened a month later. Further expansion under Sound Transit 3 is planned to divide the current corridor between two lines, the 1 Line from Ballard (via the Ballard Link Extension) to Tacoma and the 3 Line from Everett to West Seattle.

== History ==
=== Background and early transit proposals ===
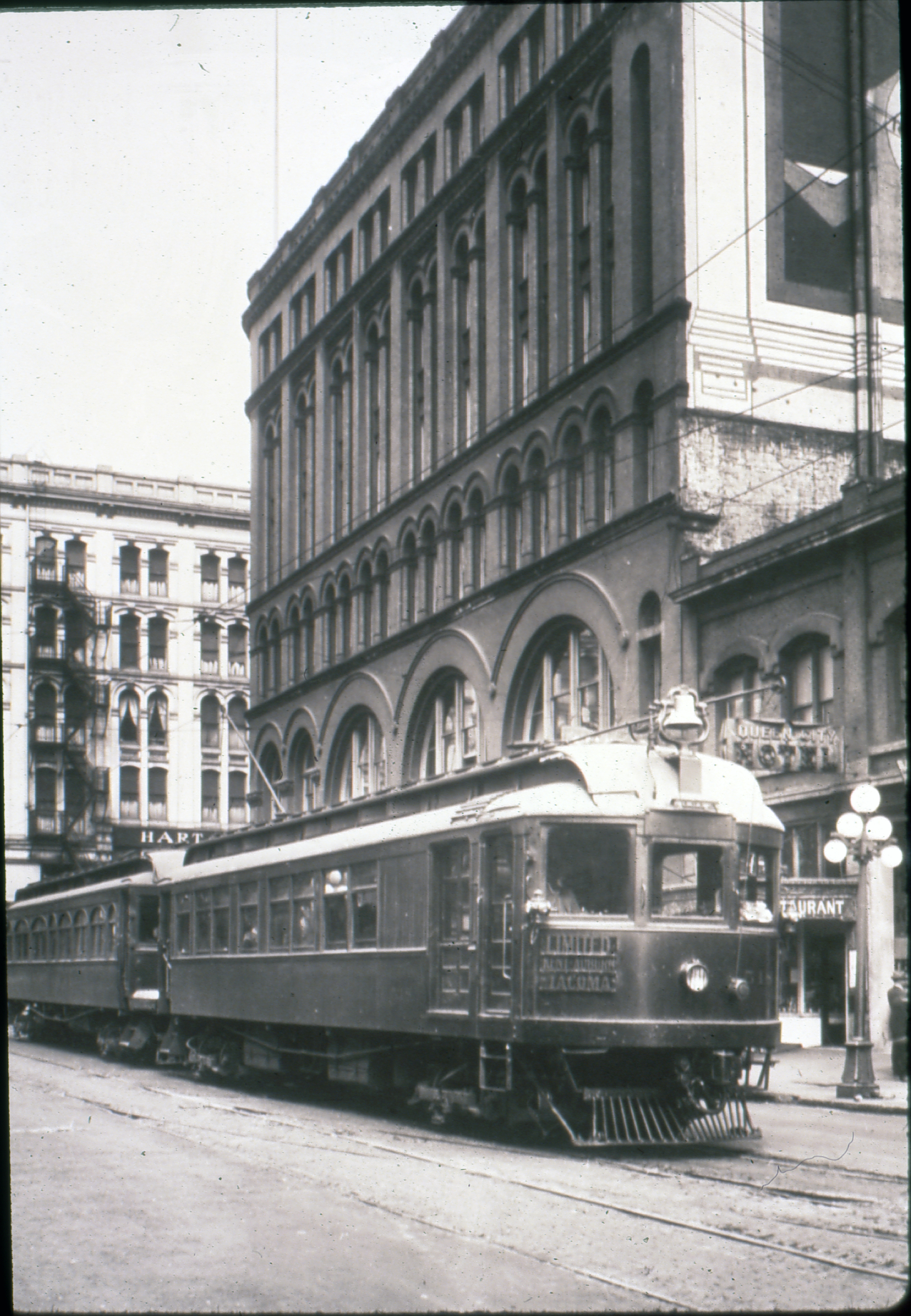
A Tacoma-bound Puget Sound Electric Railway interurban train seen in the 1920s

Public transit service within Seattle began in 1884, with the introduction of the city's first horse-drawn streetcar line. The system had been replaced with a network of electric streetcars and cable cars by the end of the decade, which spurred the development of new streetcar suburbs across modern-day Seattle. Interurban railways to Everett, Tacoma, and the Rainier Valley were established after the turn of the century, giving the region an intercity passenger rail system to feed the streetcar lines. The interurban system failed to compete with the increasing popularity of automobile travel, capped by the completion of U.S. Route 99 in the late 1920s, and was shut down. By 1941, the streetcars had also been acquired by the municipal government and replaced with a trolleybus network.

Various proposals for a rapid transit system in Seattle, to replace the streetcar—and later bus—networks, were presented in the 20th century and rejected by city officials or voters due to their cost or other factors. In 1911, urban planner Virgil Bogue proposed a 41-mile (66 km) system of subway tunnels and elevated railways as the centerpiece to a comprehensive plan for the city, which was rejected by voters. The Seattle Center Monorail, originally built for the 1962 World's Fair, has been the subject of several unsuccessful expansion proposals backed by Governor Albert Rosellini in the 1960s and Seattle voters in the early 2000s. The Forward Thrust Committee of the late 1960s proposed a 47-mile (76 km) rapid transit system, to connect Downtown Seattle to Ballard, the University District, Lake City, Capitol Hill, Bellevue, and Renton. The federal government offered to fund two-thirds of the rail system's capital costs, approximately $770 million (equivalent to $5.43 billion in 2025 dollars), if $385 million (equivalent to $2.72 billion in 2025 dollars) in local property taxes were approved by voters. The rapid transit initiative was placed on the ballot in February 1968, but fell short of the supermajority needed to pass. A second attempt in May 1970, with $440 million (equivalent to $2.81 billion in 2025 dollars) in local funding and $870 million (equivalent to $5.56 billion in 2025 dollars) in federal funding, failed amid a local economic downturn caused by layoffs at Boeing. The federal funding earmarked towards the rapid transit system was granted to Atlanta, Georgia, forming the initial funding for the Metropolitan Atlanta Rapid Transit Authority's rail system.

=== Light rail planning ===
Following the failed Forward Thrust initiatives, Metro Transit was created in 1972 to oversee a countywide bus network, and plan for a future rail system. In the early 1980s, Metro Transit and the Puget Sound Council of Governments (PSCOG) explored light rail and busway concepts to serve the region, ultimately choosing to build a downtown transit tunnel that would be convertible from buses to light rail at a later date. The PSCOG formally endorsed a light rail plan in 1986, recommending a system be built by 2020, and include a line between Seattle and Sea-Tac Airport, with routing alternatives that served the Rainier Valley. A 1988 advisory measure on light rail planning was passed in King County, encouraging Metro Transit to accelerate the plan's timeline to open by 2000. In 1990, the state legislature endorsed the creation of a regional transit board composed of politicians from King, Pierce, and Snohomish counties, with the goal of implementing the regional transit plan. Several members of the Seattle City Council endorsed the rail plan on the condition that it pass through the Rainier Valley, by then an economically disadvantaged and majority-minority neighborhood.

The Central Puget Sound Regional Transit Authority, later renamed Sound Transit, was created in 1993 to write and present a regional transit plan for voter approval. The agency proposed a 70-mile (110 km) light rail network as the centerpiece of a $6.7 billion transit ballot measure, with a surface line through the Rainier Valley and tunnels between Downtown Seattle, Capitol Hill, and the University District. The ballot measure failed to pass on March 14, 1995, and the light rail line was shortened to 25 miles (40 km), between the University District and Sea-Tac Airport. Voters approved the $3.9 billion package on November 5, 1996, along with increases to sales taxes and motor vehicle excise taxes across the regional transit district. Sound Transit considered several routing options during a series of public hearings and studies early into the project's environmental impact study, which adopted the name "Central Link". In 1999, Sound Transit selected the alignment for the light rail project, consisting of a line between the University District and Sea-Tac Airport, with surface segments passing through Tukwila, the Rainier Valley, and SoDo, and tunnels under Beacon Hill, First Hill, Capitol Hill, and Portage Bay.

=== Budget issues and delays ===
The Central Link project was originally planned to open in 2006 and projected to cost $1.9 billion (equivalent to $3.6 billion in 2025 dollars), but the estimates were found to be unrealistic by auditors in November 2000. New executives, hired by Sound Transit to replace previous program directors, presented a revised plan with an opening date pushed back three years to 2009 and a $3.8 billion (equivalent to $6.74 billion in 2025 dollars) cost estimate. Planning of the Portage Bay tunnel between Capitol Hill and the University District was suspended due to higher than expected contractor bids, attributed to difficult soil conditions. Sound Transit adopted the revised budget and schedule in January 2001, including provisions to re-study routing options between Downtown Seattle and the University District, along with a $500 million federal grant agreement to fund the construction of an "initial segment" for the project. The initial segment identified and approved by Sound Transit later that year shortened the line to 14 miles (23 km), between Downtown Seattle and a southern Tukwila station near Sea-Tac Airport. The remaining routes to the airport and University District were sent back to the planning stage, and re-organized into separate light rail projects.

In November 2001, Sound Transit approved construction of the shortened Central Link light rail project, calling for a summer 2002 groundbreaking. Property acquisition in the Rainier Valley began in March 2002, but two legal battles delayed the start of construction. In November 2002, the King County Superior Court ruled in favor of Sound Transit in a lawsuit filed by light rail opponents, alleging that it lacked the authority to shorten a voter-approved line. The approval of Tim Eyman's Initiative 776 threatened to repeal motor vehicle excise taxes needed to fund Sound Transit's budget, but was declared unconstitutional in February 2003. Another routing change requested by the City of Tukwila, placing light rail tracks along freeways in lieu of International Boulevard, was approved by Sound Transit and the Federal Transit Administration in 2002, moving the project closer to construction.

=== Construction and testing ===
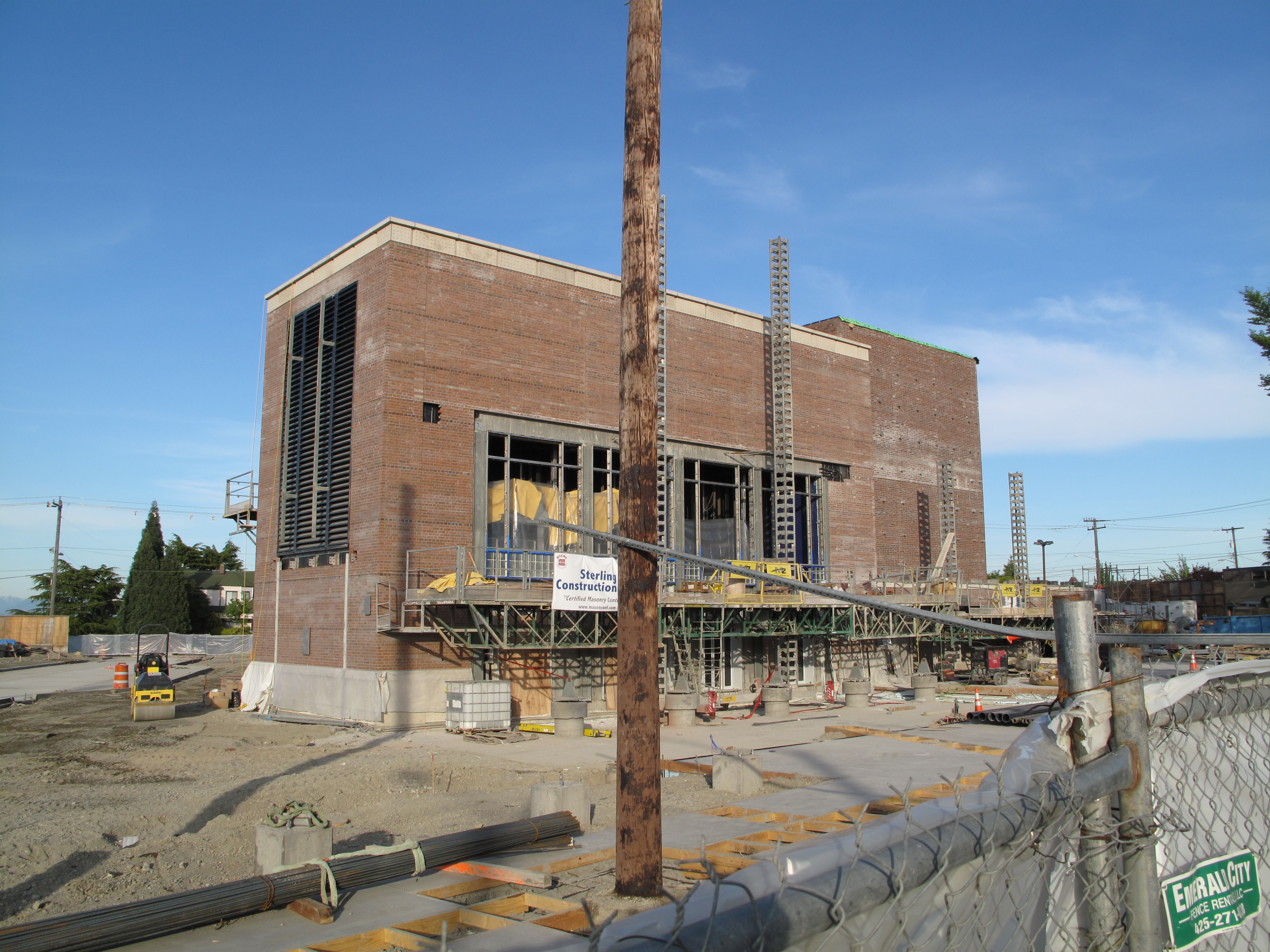
The headhouse of Beacon Hill station, seen under construction in May 2009

Sound Transit received its $500 million federal grant agreement in October 2003, and a groundbreaking ceremony was held in SoDo on November 8, 2003. Construction contracts for various segments were awarded in 2004 and 2005, coming six percent under Sound Transit's estimates, and work began along all parts of the system. Construction of the bridge over the Duwamish River in Tukwila was delayed by the discovery of more than 900 indigenous Coast Salish artifacts in February 2005; work was halted for a six-week excavation and examination by archeologists, including from the Muckleshoot Tribe. The first rails were installed on August 18, 2005, in the SoDo area; a month later, the downtown transit tunnel closed for a two-year renovation to accommodate light rail service. Excavation of the Beacon Hill tunnel and station began in 2005, and two tunnel boring machines were launched in early 2006 to bore the twin tunnels between SoDo and the Rainier Valley.

The SODO and Stadium stations were completed in May 2006, and light rail testing in the SoDo area began the following March. Testing was extended to the re-opened downtown transit tunnel in September 2007, initially limited to weekends without bus service, and further to the Rainier Valley after the completion of the Beacon Hill tunnel in 2008. The elevated guideway in Tukwila, including crossings over major freeways and the Duwamish River, was completed in 2007 after the installation of 2,457 precast concrete segments and balanced cantilever bridges. During construction in the Rainier Valley, Sound Transit and the City of Seattle offered $50 million in mitigation funds and development opportunities to affected businesses. Construction of light rail along Martin Luther King Jr. Way South also resulted in utility lines being moved underground, improved sidewalks, street crossings, and landscaping.

=== Opening and first extensions ===
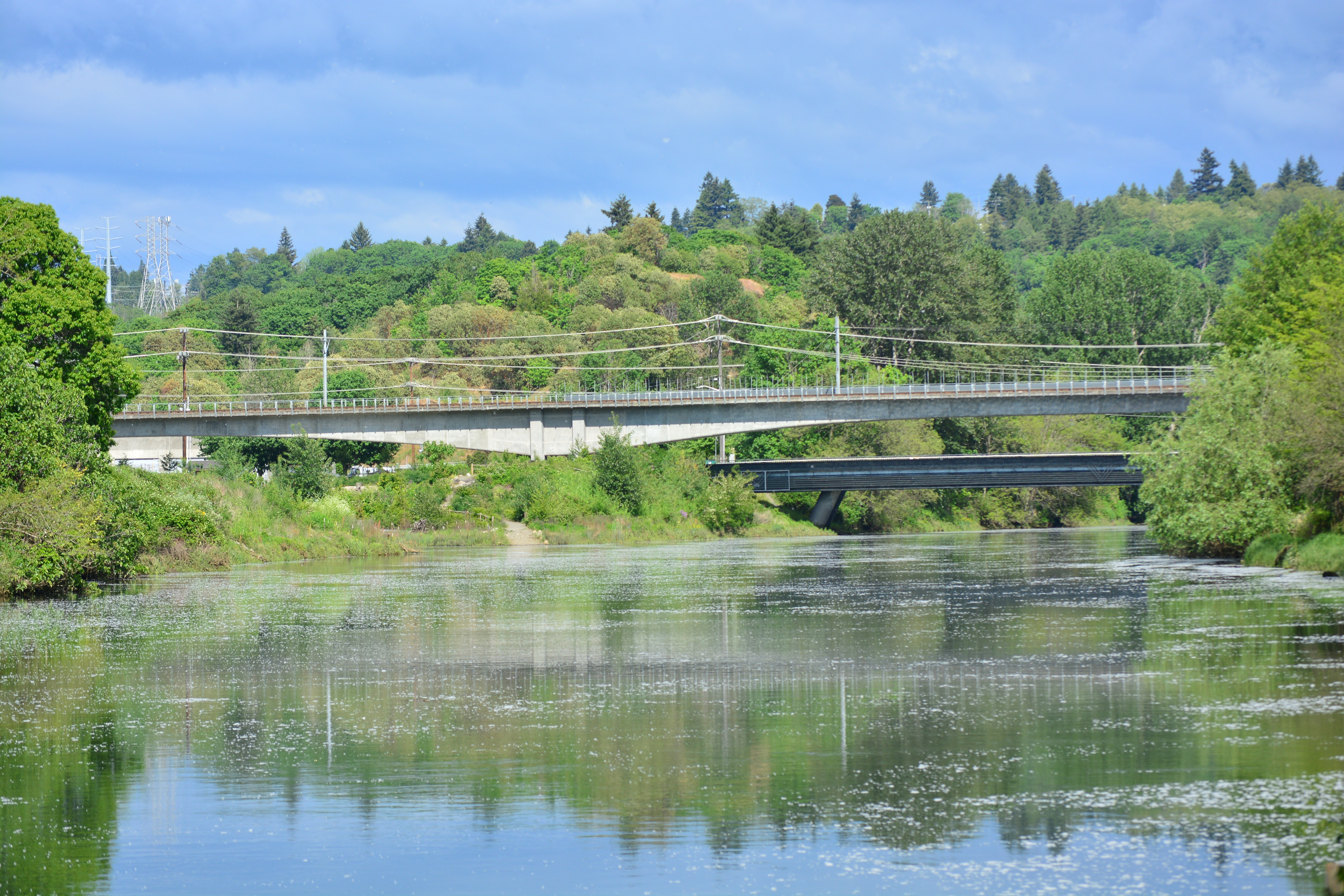
The high bridge here crosses the Duwamish River in Tukwila; the low bridge carries East Marginal Way S.

Central Link was opened on July 18, 2009, with a community celebration that attracted more than 92,000 riders over the first weekend of free service. Trains began operating on the 13.9-mile (22.4 km) segment between Westlake and Tukwila International Boulevard stations, along with a bus shuttle to serve Sea-Tac Airport from Tukwila. The 1.7-mile (2.7 km) extension to SeaTac/Airport station opened on December 19, 2009, replacing the shuttle and other bus services to the airport. Sound Transit added lubrication equipment and rubber mats to segments in Tukwila and the Rainier Valley in 2010 to reduce noise levels that had reached up to 83 decibels, surpassing federal safety standards and triggering noise complaints from nearby residents. A contract dispute with the Rainier Valley construction contractor was settled in 2011, bringing the project's total price to $117 million below the $2.44 billion budget. The opening of light rail service to the Rainier Valley spurred new transit-oriented development, which had initially stalled during the Great Recession but recovered in the mid-2010s.

Central Link train service was increased to a frequency of 6 minutes during peak hours, from 7.5 minutes, in 2015 to prepare for the opening of the University Link extension. The line was extended north to University of Washington station, via Capitol Hill station, on March 19, 2016, via a $1.8 billion, 3.15-mile (5.07 km) tunnel. The extension opened six months ahead of its scheduled date, and the opening celebrations drew 67,000 people during the first day of service. Sound Transit deployed additional three-car light rail trains to cope with higher ridership after the extension opened. The line was extended 1.6 miles (2.6 km) south from Sea-Tac Airport to Angle Lake station on September 24, 2016, including the opening of a 1,120-stall park and ride.

The escalators at Capitol Hill and University of Washington stations experienced several major failures and shutdowns in the two years since the University Link extension was opened. These failures were attributed to the installation of standard commercial escalators instead of stronger escalators designed for transit stations. A new escalator contractor was selected to provide preventative maintenance in lieu of a proposed replacement plan; new stairways and connecting passageways were also opened to allow for alternative access. The Tukwila section of the line was shut down over one weekend in October 2018 for major repairs after cracks were discovered in the rails on the 1,200-foot (370 m) bridge crossing Interstate 5.

=== Renaming and Northgate extension ===
Central Link was renamed to the "Red Line" as part of a systemwide rebranding in September 2019 by Sound Transit to prepare for the arrival of East Link (the Blue Line). Two months later, the agency announced that it would consider a new name after complaints due to the similarity of the "Red Line" with redlining, which historically affected residents of the Rainier Valley. A new designation, the 1 Line (colored green), was announced in April 2020 and took effect in September 2021.

In January 2020, Sound Transit began a ten-week construction project called "Connect 2020" that required trains to single-track in the Downtown Seattle Transit Tunnel. The closure of tracks for work on the East Link Extension where it meets the existing tracks at International District/Chinatown necessitated the construction of a temporary center platform at Pioneer Square for use by through-riding passengers. Sound Transit deployed four-car trains running every 13–15 minutes and implemented restrictions on carrying bicyclists on trains through downtown. The project was completed in late March after a week-long delay in testing, but the frequency restrictions remained due to the COVID-19 pandemic and local shutdowns. Service was reduced to every 30 minutes in April and partially restored in September to every 8 minutes during peak hours and 15 minutes during most other hours. The first of the new "Series 2" light rail vehicles, based on the Siemens S700, entered service in May 2021.

The third expansion of the 1 Line, a 4.3-mile (6.9 km) northern extension from University of Washington station to the Northgate neighborhood of Seattle, was funded by the Sound Transit 2 ballot measure in 2008 and began construction in 2012. The 3.5-mile (5.6 km) tunnel was excavated between July 2014 and September 2016 using two tunnel boring machines, creating a pair of bores between the extension's three stations. The southernmost section of the extension passes under the University of Washington campus and required several mitigation measures to reduce electromagnetic interference for laboratory equipment, including rubber dampeners on floating slabs of track and the relocation of sensitive equipment at four facilities. The Northgate extension opened on October 2, 2021, adding three stations to the line's north end.

Service on the 1 Line was disrupted several times in 2022 and 2023 by emergency repairs and maintenance projects that necessitated section closures and single-tracking with reduced frequencies. The tactile strip on the edge of platforms at several stations in the Rainier Valley was replaced after premature wear and cracking was discovered. On April 27, 2023, the ceiling of Westlake station was punctured during surface construction and necessitated two weeks of service disruptions in Downtown Seattle, including a forced transfer at Pioneer Square station. A grade crossing at Royal Brougham Way (adjacent to Stadium station) was replaced in August 2023 due to ground settling that had caused it to sink by 3 inches (7.6 cm). The project required trains to single-track and run with extensive delays, which continued during work at Othello and Rainier Beach stations that lasted until mid-September.

=== Suburban expansion ===
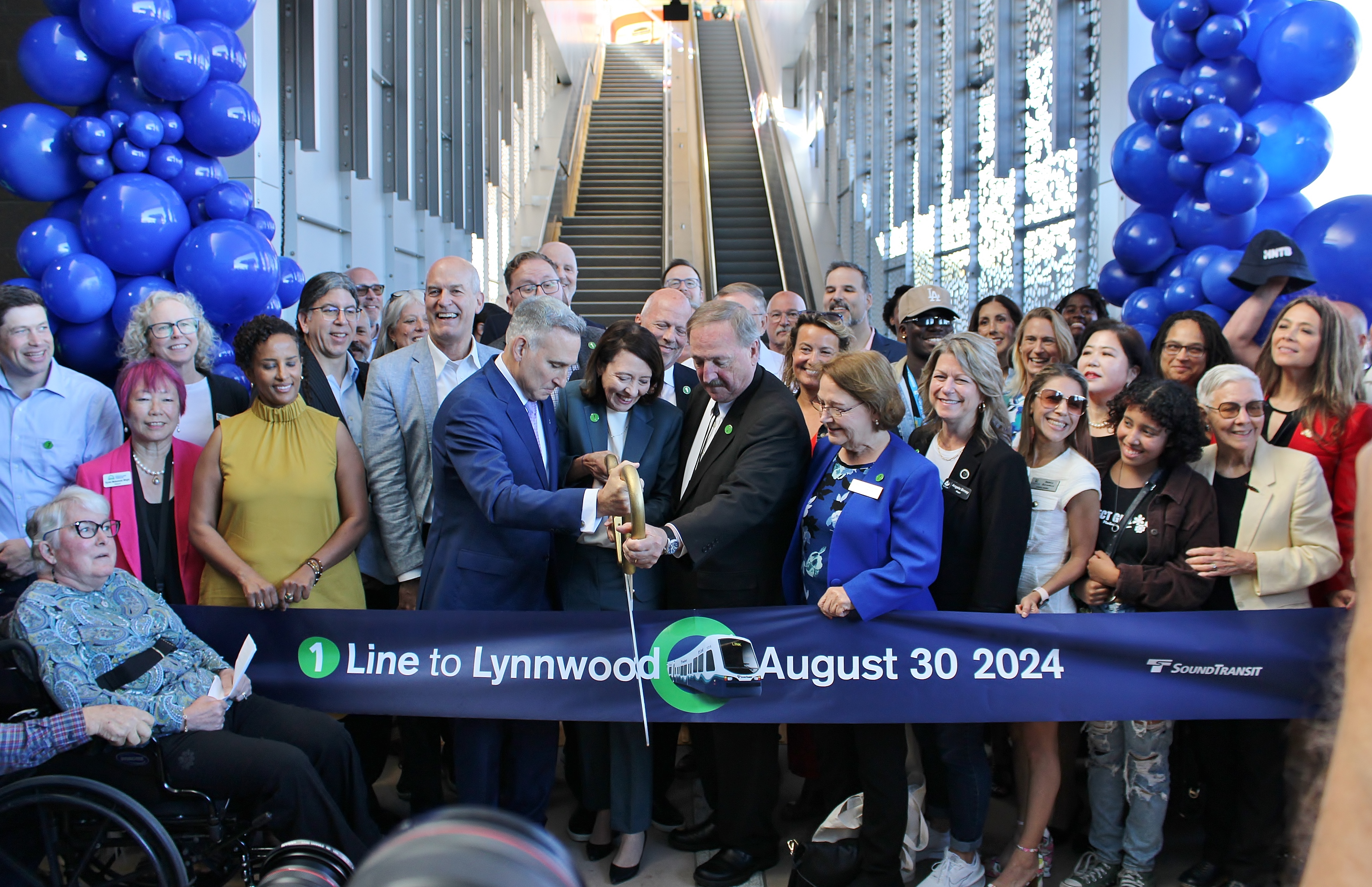
The opening ceremony for the Lynnwood Link Extension on August 30, 2024

The Lynnwood Link Extension opened on August 30, 2024, adding four stations to the line as it crossed into Snohomish County. It cost $3 billion to construct the 8.5-mile (13.7 km) extension and is expected to carry 50,000 daily passengers. On the same day, University Street station was renamed to Symphony to reduce confusion with the stations serving the University of Washington campus. A southern extension to Federal Way Downtown station opened on December 6, 2025. It comprises 7.8 miles (12.6 km) of track and includes two intermediate stops; the project, named the Federal Way Link Extension, had initially been approved under Sound Transit 2 but required additional funding that was included in Sound Transit 3.

Interlined service on the Lynnwood–Seattle section began in February 2026 with the launch of simulated testing for the 2 Line. The simulated service allowed passengers to board trains between Lynnwood City Center and International District/Chinatown stations and added trains to bring frequency to four minutes during peak periods. The new line, which serves the Eastside, fully opened in March 2026 with 13 stations shared with the 1 Line. The full 2 Line between Seattle and the Eastside was planned to open before Lynnwood and provide access to the Bellevue operations and maintenance facility. To maintain eight-minute frequencies with four-car trains, some vehicles were instead parked overnight at the SODO operations and maintenance facility and some stations. Evening service was reduced and some bus service on the Lynnwood–Seattle corridor was temporarily retained to accommodate overflow passengers. Pinehurst station, the first infill addition to the 1 Line, opened on September 30, 2026. It was removed from the Lynnwood extension and funded separately in Sound Transit 3.

== Route ==
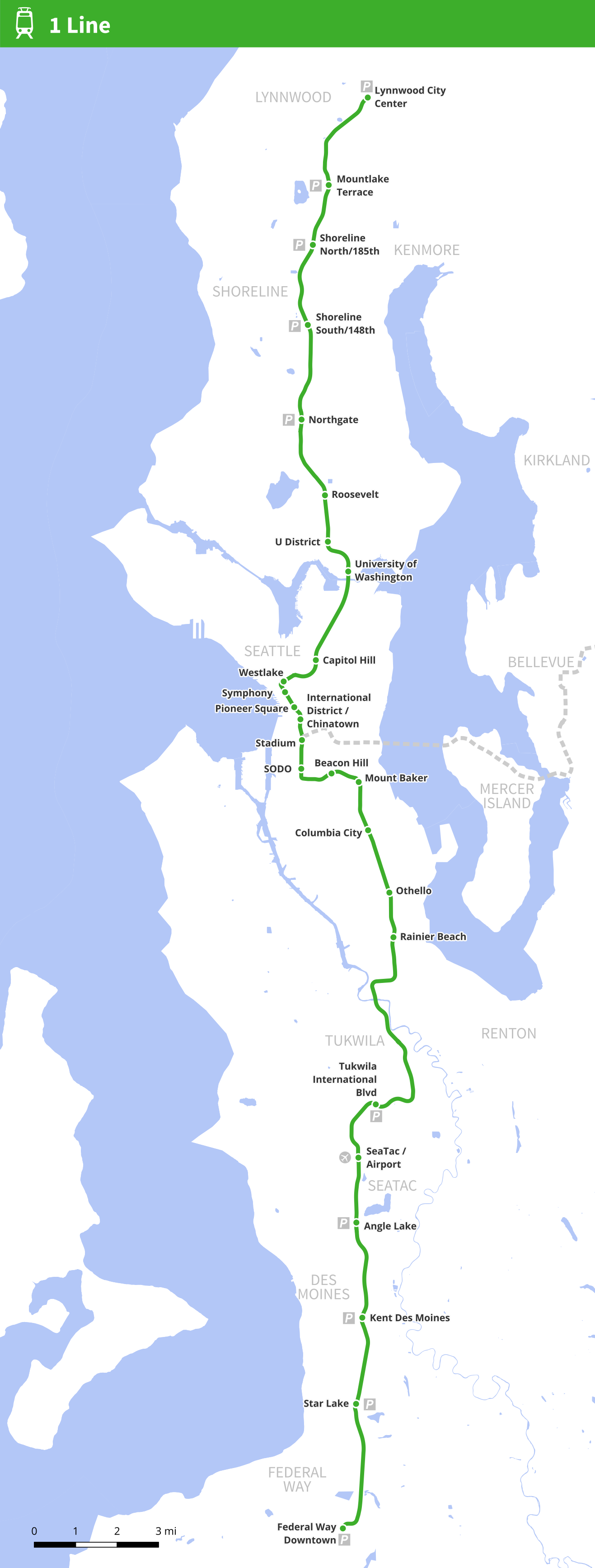
Map of 1 Line and its stations

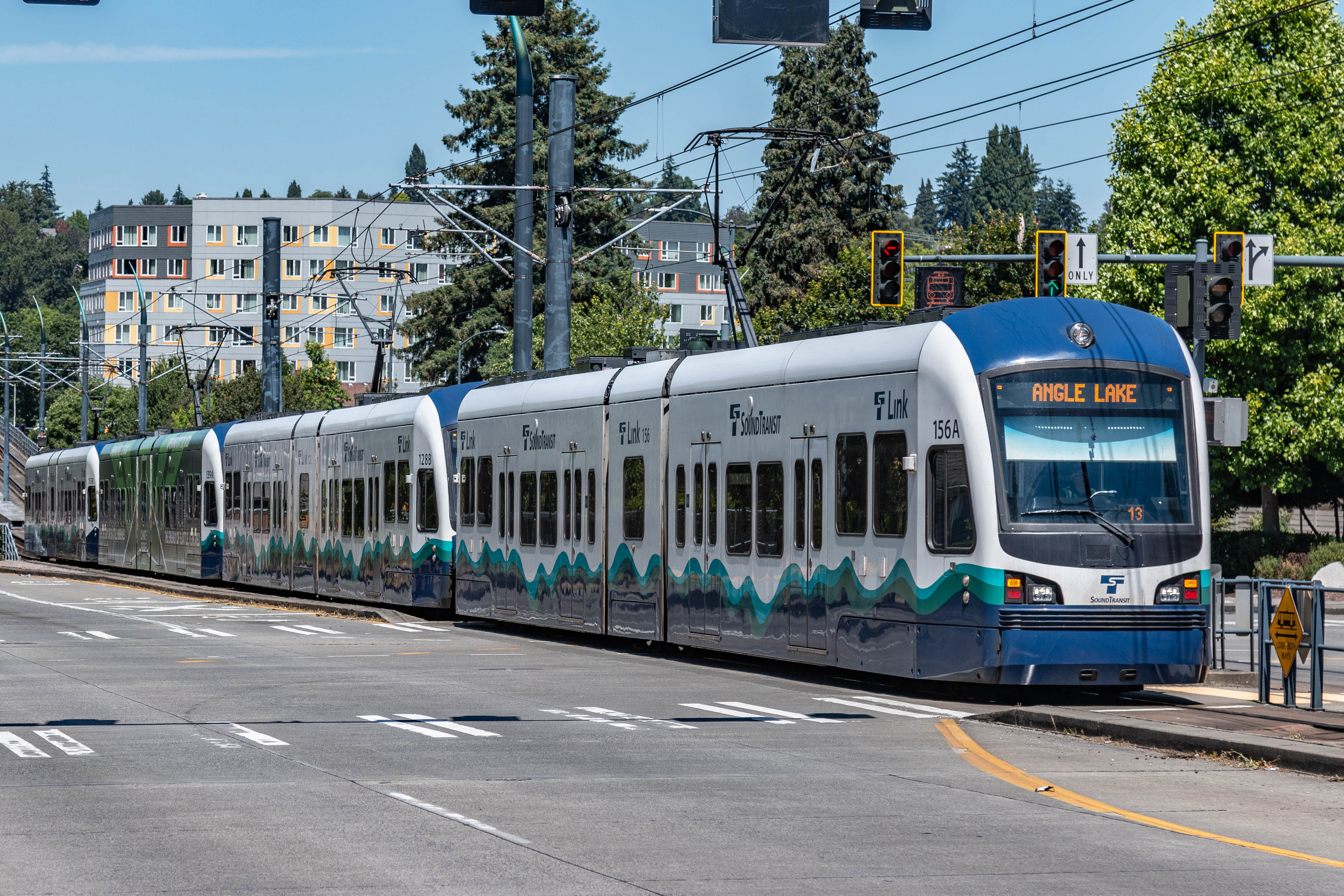
A four-car Series 1 light rail train on Martin Luther King Jr. Way in Seattle

The shared northern terminus of the 1 Line and 2 Line is Lynnwood City Center station, a major bus hub in Snohomish County in downtown Lynnwood. Trains depart from the station on an elevated guideway over Scriber Creek and a bus yard used by the Edmonds School District before it follows the west side of Interstate 5. The tracks descend into a trench before crossing over Interstate 5 in Mountlake Terrace. The 1 Line reaches its first outbound stop, Mountlake Terrace station over 236th Street Southwest, and continues on an elevated guideway that crosses State Route 104 into Shoreline and King County. The tracks then descend to the surface and continue along the east side of Interstate 5 to serve Shoreline North/185th station, which includes a two-story parking garage and terminus for the Swift Bus Rapid Transit system. The 1 Line continues south until it reaches the elevated Shoreline South/148th station, the future terminus of the Stride S3 Line. The line travels into Seattle on an elevated guideway that passes Jackson Park and Pinehurst station, an infill station at Northeast 130th Street. After a brief return to the surface alignment, the tracks travel over several streets near the Northgate Mall and approaches Northgate station.

From Northgate station, the line continues south elevated before diving into the Northgate Link tunnel in the Maple Leaf neighborhood. The 3.4-mile (5.5 km) tunnel travels southeast through Roosevelt, serving a station near Northeast 65th Street, and south to U District station before reaching the University of Washington campus. The tunnel travels southeast under the campus to University of Washington station, located near Husky Stadium, from which it heads south in the University Link tunnel, crossing under the Montlake Cut of the Lake Washington Ship Canal and State Route 520 before taking a turn to the southwest. The tunnel climbs Capitol Hill and passes under Interlaken Park and Volunteer Park before turning due south to enter Capitol Hill station on the east side of Broadway. The tunnel makes a gradual turn to the west, dipping as far south as East Union Street, and crosses under Interstate 5 at Pine Street. It merges into the Downtown Seattle Transit Tunnel within the Pine Street Stub Tunnel, where it formerly merged with buses from Convention Place station.

The downtown transit tunnel, formerly shared between light rail trains and buses, travels west under Pine Street through Westlake station and south on 3rd Avenue through Symphony and Pioneer Square stations in Downtown Seattle. The tunnel ends at International District/Chinatown station, adjacent to King Street Station (served by Amtrak and Sounder commuter rail); from here, 1 Line travels south through SoDo along the east side of the SODO Busway while the 2 Line turns east to cross Lake Washington. The SoDo section has two stations, Stadium and SODO, and includes several gated crossings. From SODO station, the track ascends to an elevated guideway traveling east along South Forest Street, passing the line's railyard and maintenance facility. The elevated trackway passes over Airport Way and comes to rest on an embankment under Interstate 5, entering the Beacon Hill tunnel.

The Beacon Hill tunnel travels approximately one mile (1.6 km) under Beacon Hill, serving a station at Beacon Avenue South. Trains exit the tunnel on the east side of the hill, turning southeast and approaching the elevated Mount Baker station at the intersection of Rainier Avenue South and Martin Luther King Jr. Way South. Light rail trains descend from Mount Baker station onto the median of Martin Luther King Jr. Way South, running at-grade with signal priority at 28 street crossings. The 1 Line passes through the Rainier Valley and serves three at-grade stations, Columbia City, Othello, and Rainier Beach, before leaving Seattle.

The line enters Tukwila and crosses west over Interstate 5 and a mainline railroad at Boeing Access Road, near Boeing Field, before making a southward turn over East Marginal Way South. The 1 Line continues south over the Duwamish River, traveling non-stop through Tukwila on a 4.7-mile (7.6 km) elevated guideway. The guideway runs along the west sides of State Route 599 and Interstate 5 towards Southcenter Mall, where it turns west along State Route 518. The line passes through Tukwila International Boulevard station, home to a 600-stall park and ride facility, and turns south into the median of the Airport Expressway towards SeaTac. Light rail trains continue along the east side of Seattle–Tacoma International Airport, stopping at SeaTac/Airport station near the airport's terminals, before reaching Angle Lake station. They then continue south along State Route 509 and Interstate 5 to serve Kent Des Moines and Star Lake stations—both in the outskirts of Kent. The line travels south to its terminus at Federal Way Downtown station, located near the Commons at Federal Way shopping center in the city of the same name.

The 1 Line, while officially a "light rail" line, has also been described as a "light metro" hybrid by transit experts due to its grade separated sections and use of longer trainsets than typical American light rail systems. It is 41 miles (66 km) long and includes 7 miles (11 km) of at-grade tracks; these at-grade tracks include some segments along freeways that are separated from intersecting roads.

=== Stations ===
Stations on the 1 Line are spaced approximately one mile (1.6 km) apart in most areas and are built with 380-foot-long (120 m) platforms to accommodate four-car train sets. Some stations are grade separated, with underground or elevated platforms connected to surface entrances by stairs, escalators, and elevators, while others were built at street level. The line's stations include bus connections, ticket vending machines, real-time arrivals information signs, public art, and bicycle parking. Stations are also designed with clear sight lines on platforms, emergency phones and lights, and are monitored with surveillance cameras.

All stations are connected to local bus routes, including parallel King County Metro, Community Transit, and Sound Transit Express services that stop at multiple Link stations. Metro Flex, an on-demand ride-hail shuttle service operated by King County Metro and Via, launched in 2019 at five stations in the Rainier Valley and Tukwila. It accepted Metro fares and was subsidized by the Seattle city government. As of 2024, there are seven stations that have public park and ride facilities; for other stations, Sound Transit and local governments encourage alternative means of transportation to and from stations, including bus riding, walking, or bicycling.

List of 1 Line stations
Code	Station	City	Type	Image	Opened	Connections and notes
40	Lynnwood City Center	Lynnwood	Elevated	Western side of Lynnwood City Center Station on opening day with vendor booths and crowds in the foreground.	August 30, 2024	Connects with the 2 Line; Park and ride: 1,896 stalls
41	Mountlake Terrace	Mountlake Terrace	Elevated	Western side of Mountlake Terrace Station with a train in the foreground.	August 30, 2024	Connects with the 2 Line; Park and ride: 870 stalls
42	Shoreline North/185th	Shoreline	At-grade	Shoreline North/185th Station from the south side on opening day	August 30, 2024	Connects with the 2 Line; Park and ride: 494 stalls
43	Shoreline South/148th	Shoreline	Elevated	Shoreline South/148th Station platforms viewed from the elevated parking garage	August 30, 2024	Connects with the 2 Line; Park and ride: 500 stalls
44	Pinehurst	Seattle	Elevated	South entrance of Pinehurst Station	September 30, 2026	Connects with the 2 Line
45	Northgate	Seattle	Elevated	Western side of Northgate station on opening day	October 2, 2021	Connects with the 2 Line; Park and ride: 1,380 stalls
46	Roosevelt	Seattle	Underground	Entrance to Roosevelt station	October 2, 2021	Connects with the 2 Line
47	U District	Seattle	Underground	Platform level at U District station	October 2, 2021	Connects with the 2 Line
48	University of Washington	Seattle	Underground	Entrance to University of Washington station	March 19, 2016	Connects with the 2 Line
49	Capitol Hill	Seattle	Underground	Platform at Capitol Hill station	March 19, 2016	Connects with the 2 Line; Connects with First Hill Streetcar
50	Westlake	Seattle	Underground	Light rail train arriving at Westlake station's platform	July 18, 2009 (Note: Stations in the Downtown Seattle Transit Tunnel originally opened as bus-only facilities on September 15, 1990, with light rail service commencing on July 18, 2009.)	Connects with the 2 Line; Connects with Seattle Center Monorail and South Lake Union Streetcar
51	Symphony (Note: Formerly named University Street station until August 30, 2024.)	Seattle	Underground	Metro bus and light rail train at Symphony station	July 18, 2009	Connects with the 2 Line
52	Pioneer Square	Seattle	Underground	Light rail train at Pioneer Square station	July 18, 2009	Connects with the 2 Line; Connects with Washington State Ferries, King County Water Taxi, and Kitsap Fast Ferries
53	International District/Chinatown	Seattle	Underground	Light rail train and bus at International District/Chinatown station	July 18, 2009	Connects with the 2 Line; Connects with Amtrak, Sounder commuter rail, and First Hill Streetcar
54	Stadium	Seattle	At-grade	Entrance to Stadium station	July 18, 2009	Connects with Greyhound
55	SODO	Seattle	At-grade	Light rail train at SODO station	July 18, 2009	
56	Beacon Hill	Seattle	Underground	Entrance and headhouse at Beacon Hill station	July 18, 2009	
57	Mount Baker	Seattle	Elevated	Mount Baker station, viewed from across the street	July 18, 2009	
58	Columbia City	Seattle	At-grade	Platforms at Columbia City station	July 18, 2009	
60	Othello	Seattle	At-grade	Platform at Othello station	July 18, 2009	
61	Rainier Beach	Seattle	At-grade	Light rail train at Rainier Beach station	July 18, 2009	
63	Tukwila International Boulevard	Tukwila	Elevated	Park and ride at Tukwila International Boulevard station	July 18, 2009	Park and ride: 600 stalls
64	SeaTac/Airport	SeaTac	Elevated	Platform and mezzanine at SeaTac/ Airport station	December 19, 2009	Serves Seattle–Tacoma International Airport
65	Angle Lake	SeaTac	Elevated	Platform at Angle Lake station	September 24, 2016	Park and ride: 1,160 stalls
66	Kent Des Moines	Kent	Elevated	Platform and entrance at Kent Des Moines station	December 6, 2025	Park and ride: 500 stalls
67	Star Lake	Kent	Elevated	Platform at Star Lake station	December 6, 2025	Park and ride: 1,100 stalls
68	Federal Way Downtown	Federal Way	Elevated	Platform at Federal Way Downtown station	December 6, 2025	Park and ride: 1,524 stalls

== Service ==
1 Line trains run 20 hours per day from Monday to Saturday, from 5:00 am to 1:00 am, and 18 hours on Sundays and federal holidays, from 6:00 am to midnight. Trains operate most frequently during weekday peak periods, running every eight minutes from 6:00 am to 9:30 am and from 3:00 pm to 6:30 pm. Trains run every 10 minutes during midday and evening hours on weekdays and all day on weekends. Train frequency is reduced to every 15 minutes during the early morning and late night hours of all days. A night bus operated by Sound Transit stops at select 1 Line stops between Downtown Seattle and Federal Way with service every 30 minutes from 10:30 p.m. to 6:00 a.m. During scheduled and unscheduled disruptions to train service, a shuttle bus operated by Community Transit and King County Metro is deployed with service between Link stations.

End-to-end travel from Lynnwood to Federal Way station takes 88 minutes, while trips between Downtown Seattle and SeaTac/Airport station take 38 minutes. The SeaTac–Westlake corridor was formerly served by King County Metro bus route 194, which took 32 minutes to travel between the two areas, and used bus stops that were closer to the terminal. The bus route ran at less frequent intervals, was subject to traffic delays, and had shorter hours of operation. Until 2026, the final northbound trips during late night service terminated at Beacon Hill station instead of continuing through Downtown Seattle. The truncation allowed for overnight maintenance to begin earlier on some sections; these trains terminated at Stadium station before a change in 2024. The trips were eliminated in March 2026 and replaced by the night bus from SeaTac/Airport station to Downtown Seattle.

=== Ridership ===
Annual 1 Line ridership
Year	Ridership	%±
2009	2,501,211	—
2010	6,989,504	179.4%
2011	7,812,433	11.8%
2012	8,699,821	11.4%
2013	9,681,432	11.3%
2014	10,937,883	13%
2015	11,530,411	5.4%
2016	19,121,621	65.8%
2017	23,186,633	21.3%
2018	24,416,411	5.3%
2019	25,075,922	2.7%
2020	9,660,736	-61.5%
2021	11,512,650	19.2%
2022	23,706,210	105.9%
2023	26,883,140	13.4%
2024	28,910,300	7.5%
2025	35,564,496	23%
Source: Sound Transit

1 Line trains carried over 35.5 million total passengers in 2025 and averaged 102,895 riders on weekdays. Ridership is measured by on-board infrared passenger counters that automatically record the number of people entering and leaving the train. As of 2025, approximately 32 percent of Series 1 vehicles have automatic passenger counters, while all Series 2 vehicles were installed with them.

Ridership on the 1 Line has risen significantly from the beginning of service in 2009, when it averaged 15,500 per weekday. In 2010, ridership fell below projected levels due to an economic downturn, with only 21,611 daily riders on the line. Ridership increased significantly in the following years, surpassing 25,000 daily riders in 2012, 30,000 in 2014, and 35,000 in 2015. The opening of the University Link extension in March 2016 increased daily ridership by 66 percent in its first month of operation, and averaged 66,203 daily riders during the last quarter of the year. A single-day ridership record of 82,361 estimated boardings was set on April 8, 2016, due to a Seattle Mariners home opener and the Emerald City Comic Con. The record was surpassed five months later on September 30, estimated at 101,000 riders, when the Washington Huskies football team and Seattle Mariners both hosted home games.

Ridership fell to 9.7 million total passengers in 2020, a decline of 61 percent from 2019, due to the COVID-19 pandemic and other service reductions. Link ridership grew following the 2021 opening of the Northgate Link Extension and reopening of offices, which allowed it to exceed pre-pandemic levels. The line set a single-day record of 115,600 boardings on July 11, 2023, during the Major League Baseball All-Star Game at T-Mobile Park. This record was surpassed twice by the end of the month due to several simultaneous weekend events, including Taylor Swift's The Eras Tour concerts at Lumen Field, Mariners games at T-Mobile Park, and the Capitol Hill Block Party. A new record of 136,800 boardings was set on July 23 and became the twelfth day that month with more than 100,000 boardings. The record was surpassed on August 30 with 157,692 boardings on the day of the Lynnwood Link Extension's opening. In September 2024, the line's average Saturday ridership had reached 82,000 boardings, surpassing the weekday average of 79,000 riders.

The 1 Line set a new ridership record on February 11, 2026, during a victory parade for the Seattle Seahawks after the team won their second Super Bowl. An estimated 200,000 passengers boarded trains according to preliminary estimates.

=== Fares ===
The 1 Line uses a proof-of-payment system, requiring valid payment before boarding and lacking a turnstile barrier at stations. Fares can be purchased as paper tickets at ticket vending machines at stations, credit or passes loaded on an ORCA card, a contactless payment card or platform, or through a mobile ticketing app. Fare ambassadors check for valid fares while aboard trains or in the fare-paid zone of stations; passengers who do not present a valid ticket or validated ORCA card are offered educational materials and warnings. Until 2021, fare inspectors and transit police officers checked fares and issued warnings or a $124 citation to passengers who did not present a valid form of payment. Following the dismissal of fare inspectors, an estimated 42 percent of passengers in January 2022 did not pay their fare. A new program led by fare ambassadors was approved in September 2022, enacting a multi-step system with monetary penalties beginning with the third violation and a $124 infraction for a fifth violation.

Fares are a flat rate of $3 for adults, $1 for passengers eligible for reduced fares, and free for people 18 years old or younger. Until 2024, the fares were calculated based on distance traveled and ranged from $2.25 to $3.50 for adults. ORCA card users were required to tap a reader before and after riding a train to calculate the fare. Reduced fares are available to elderly passengers, persons with disabilities, and low-income passengers enrolled in ORCA Lift. Transfers from other modes, including buses, water taxis, and streetcars, are only accepted using ORCA cards. Since September 2022, fares for passengers under the age of 19 have been free as part of a statewide transit grant.

== Rolling stock and equipment ==
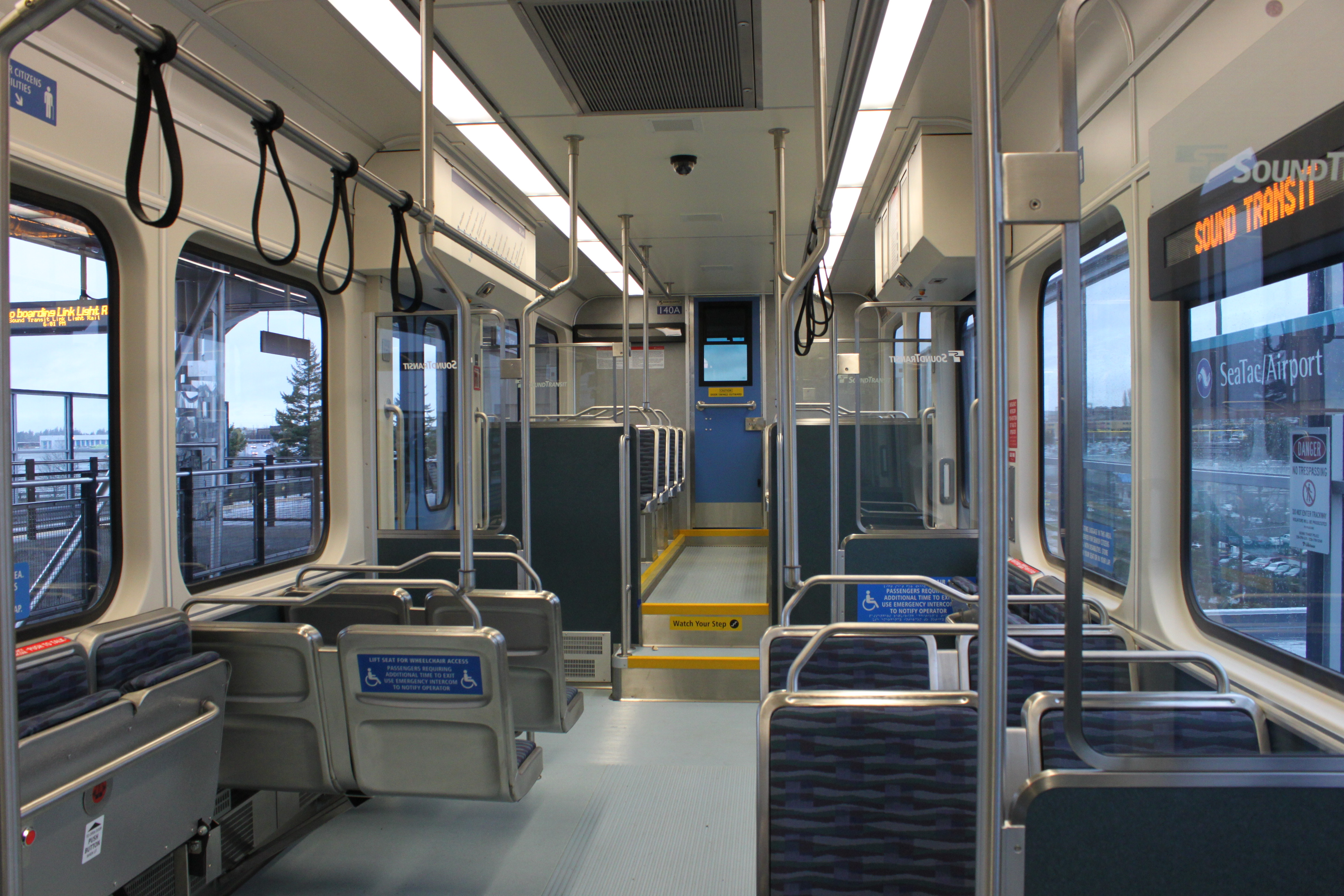
Interior of a Series 1 light rail vehicle manufactured by Kinkisharyo-Mitsui light rail vehicle

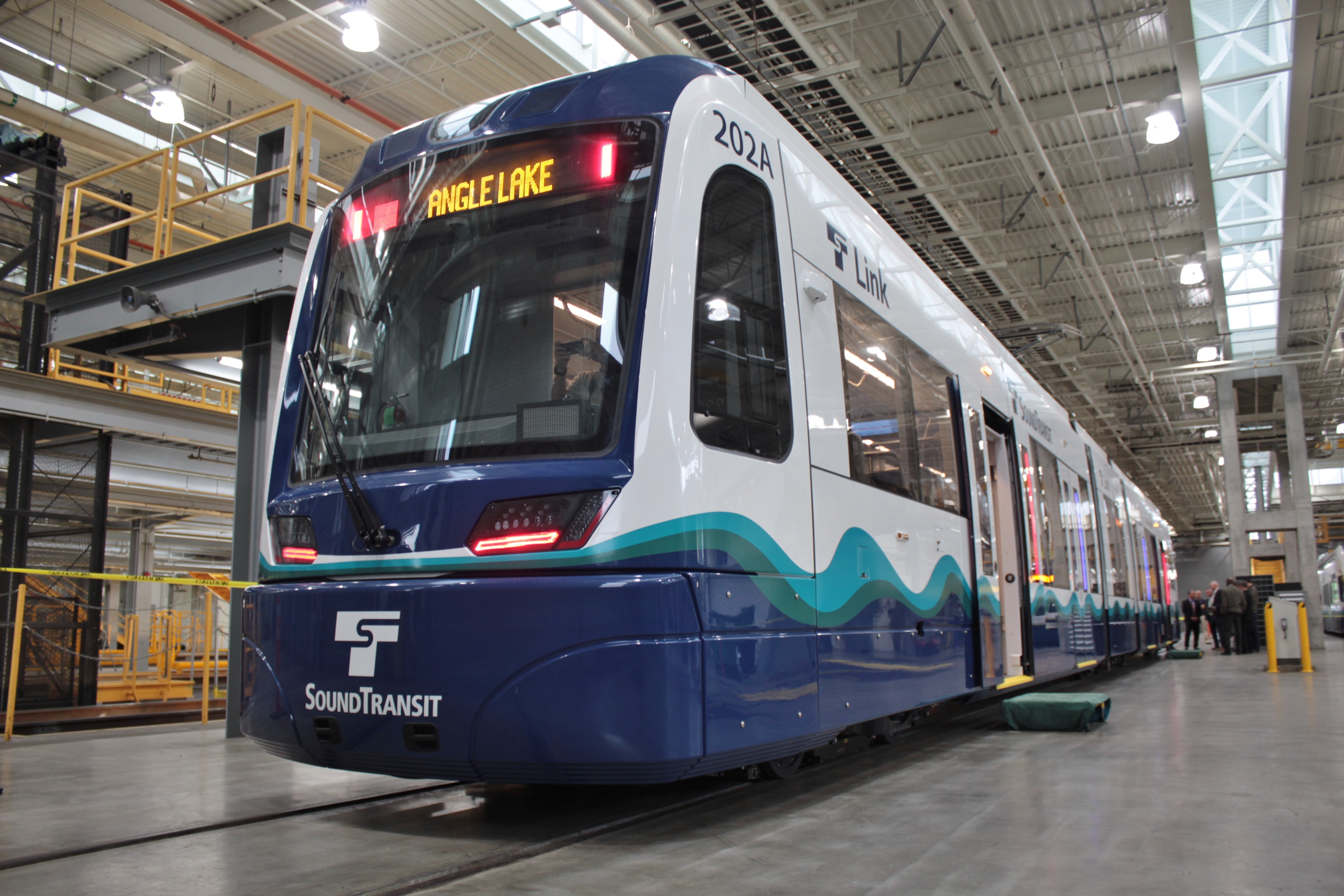
Exterior of a Series 2 light rail vehicle, a variant of the Siemens S700 (Note: At the time of purchase and receipt of the first cars, the second generation of light rail vehicles were a version of Siemens' model S70, but Siemens retroactively rebranded this version as the S700 in 2020.) that entered service in 2021

The original "Series 1" fleet used on the 1 Line consisted of 62 low-floor light rail vehicles manufactured in Japan by Kinkisharyo. The Kinkisharyo vehicles, built through a joint venture with Mitsui & Co., have 74 seats and can carry 194 seated and standing passengers at standard capacity; a maximum "crush load" of 252 passengers per car can be carried by Link trains for short distances. Individual railcars are 95 feet (29.0 m) long and 8.7 feet (2.7 m) wide, sporting dual cabs that allow cars to travel in either direction. The interior is 70 percent low-floor, while the remaining 30 percent is raised above the floor and accessed via stairs. Railcars include four doors on each side, fold-up seating areas for wheelchairs, and two bicycle hooks above luggage storage areas. 1 Line trains are typically arranged into three-car and four-car sets, but until 2021 all trains were two or three cars long. The trains have a top speed of 58 miles per hour (93 km/h), but typically operate at 35 mph (56 km/h) on surface sections and 55 mph (89 km/h) on elevated and tunneled sections. Link uses a form of positive train control to prevent trains from exceeding the set speed limit for a given area.

Trains are supplied electricity through an overhead catenary that is energized at 1,500 V DC and converted to three-phase alternating current through on-board inverters. While other North American light rail systems use 750 V DC technology, Sound Transit chose to use 1,500 V DC to reduce the number of electrical substations, which are spaced approximately one mile (1.6 km) apart. Sound Transit placed its initial order of 31 light rail vehicles in 2003, and added four more vehicles in 2005 for the extension to SeaTac/Airport station. The cars were assembled in Everett, to comply with Buy America requirements, and delivered from 2006 to 2008. Another 27 vehicles were ordered for the University Link extension in 2009 and were delivered from 2010 to 2011. The 1 Line fleet is stored and maintained at a 26-acre (10.5 ha) operating base in SoDo, between SODO and Beacon Hill stations. It opened in 2007, at a cost of $74 million to construct, and has a capacity of 105 light rail vehicles, including nine bays inside the 162,000-square-foot (15,100 m^{2}) maintenance building that can hold 16 vehicles. 1 Line trains are operated and maintained by King County Metro under a contract with Sound Transit that was renewed in 2019 and is set to expire at the end of 2023.

In September 2016, Sound Transit approved a $554 million order to Siemens Mobility for 122 S700 "Series 2" light rail vehicles to serve planned extensions to Northgate, Lynnwood, the Eastside, and Federal Way. Another 30 vehicles were added to the order in April 2017, bringing the total to 152 vehicles. The first Series 2 car arrived at Sound Transit's maintenance facility in June 2019, featuring the same seating capacity but a wider central walkway and other new features. The first Siemens cars entered service on May 14, 2021. A satellite maintenance facility in Bellevue was opened in 2021 to accommodate 96 more vehicles, including part of the new fleet and older Series 1 vehicles undergoing retrofit work. A third facility is planned to be built near Federal Way to support future system expansion.

== Future plans ==
Sound Transit's expansion ballot measures, passed as Sound Transit 2 in 2008 and Sound Transit 3 in 2016, enabled the planning of future Link light rail extensions, scheduled to open in stages between 2021 and 2040. In 2032, the 3 Line to West Seattle is scheduled to begin service, temporarily operating between Alaska Junction and SODO station. The opening of the Ballard Link Extension by 2039, traveling via a new tunnel through Downtown Seattle, is planned to split the corridor between two lines: the 1 Line, operating from Ballard to Tacoma via the Rainier Valley and Sea-Tac Airport; and the 3 Line, operating from Lynnwood (and later Everett) to West Seattle. Two infill stations along the current route of the 1 Line are planned to open in 2031 at South Graham Street in the Rainier Valley and Boeing Access Road in northern Tukwila.
