= Mount Baker station =

Light rail station in Seattle, Washington

57 Mount Baker
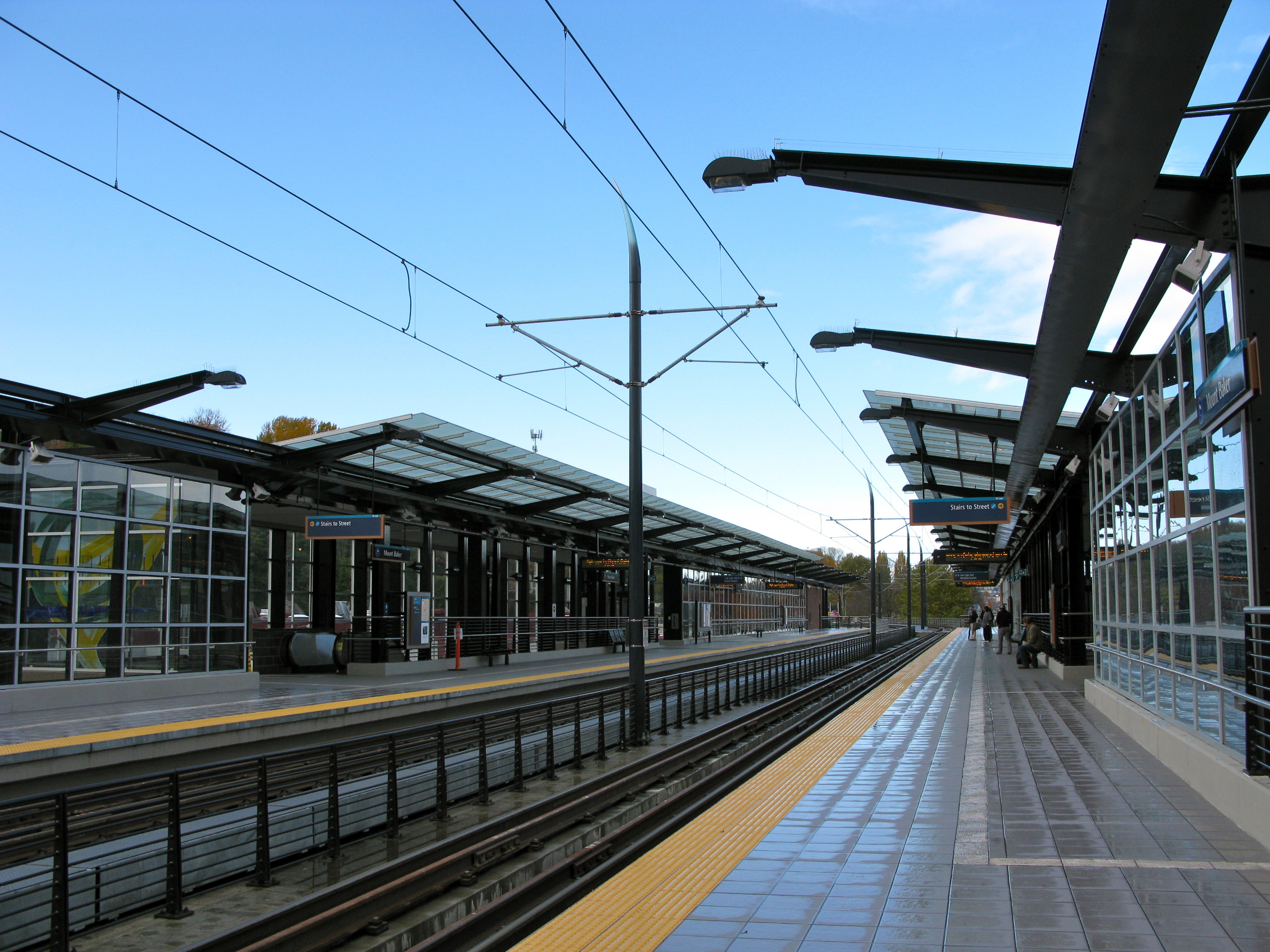
- The northbound platform at Mount Baker station

General information
- Location: 3000 Rainier Avenue South; Seattle, Washington; United States
- Coordinates: 47°34′35.7″N 122°17′51.7″W
- System: Link light rail
- Owner: Sound Transit
- Platforms: 2 side platforms
- Tracks: 2
- Connections: King County Metro

Construction
- Structure type: Elevated
- Parking: Paid parking nearby
- Cycle facilities: Lockers
- Accessible: Yes

History
- Opened: July 18, 2009

Passengers
- 2,575 daily weekday boardings (2025); 869,114 total boardings (2025)

Services
Preceding station	Sound Transit	Following station
Link
Beacon Hill toward Lynnwood City Center	1 Line	Columbia City toward Federal Way Downtown
Location

Mount Baker station is a light rail station located in Seattle, Washington. It is situated between the Columbia City and Beacon Hill stations on the 1 Line, which runs from Seattle–Tacoma International Airport to Downtown Seattle, the University of Washington, and Northgate as part of the Link light rail system. The elevated station consists of two side platforms located west of the intersection of Rainier Avenue and Martin Luther King Jr. Way in the Mount Baker neighborhood, part of Seattle's Rainier Valley.

A light rail station in the Mount Baker area was first proposed in 1995 and approved the following year. Construction began in late 2005 and the station was opened for regular service on July 18, 2009. Trains serve the station twenty hours a day on most days; the headway between trains is eight minutes during peak periods, with less frequent service at other times. Mount Baker station is also served by five King County Metro bus routes that connect it to Downtown, Capitol Hill, Rainier Beach, the Central District, and the University District.

== Location ==
Mount Baker station is located west of the Rainier Avenue and Martin Luther King Jr. Way intersection in the Mount Baker neighborhood of Seattle, at the foot of Beacon Hill. The area surrounding the station consists of single-family detached homes and retail big-box stores, housing 6,675 and employing 2,208 respectively. Nearby pedestrian amenities include a bus station for King County Metro routes one block northeast and an overpass of Rainier Avenue and Martin Luther King Jr. Way connecting to Mount Baker Boulevard and Franklin High School.

In 2014, the Seattle Department of Transportation began planning of its "Accessible Mt. Baker" plan, which would rebuild the street grid surrounding the station and adding facilities for bikes and buses. Part of the $10–20 million plan would move bus stops at the existing off-street transit center to the plaza under Mount Baker station, with bus lanes and a special bus-only street on South Winthrop Street between Rainier Avenue and Martin Luther King Jr. Way; the proposal was funded as part of the "Move Seattle" levy passed by voters in November 2015.

=== Transit-oriented development ===
A 10-block, 37-acre (150,000 m^{2}) area surrounding Mount Baker station was designated as the Mount Baker Station Area Overlay District and approved for rezoning by the Seattle City Council in June 2014. The rezone raised building heights from a maximum of 65 feet (20 m) to 125 feet (38 m) with hopes of attracting transit-oriented development around the station. The first major development in the rezoned area was the four-story Artspace Mount Baker Lofts, which opened in 2014 and has 57 units and no parking spaces.

The triangular block on the south side of the intersection of Rainier Avenue and Martin Luther King Jr. Way is planned to have two apartment buildings. An affordable housing complex with 95 family units managed by Mercy Housing opened in 2020 with funding from the Paul G. Allen Family Foundation. Immediately to the north is ViV Crossing, a planned eight-story building with 172 units and underground parking for 74 vehicles and 148 bicycles. The west side of Mount Baker Station was occupied by the University of Washington Consolidated Laundry and a parking lot that were demolished in 2026 for redevelopment. The 5-acre (2.0 ha) site, owned by the city government and Sound Transit, was leased to El Centro de la Raza and Mercy Housing for 99 years for a new affordable housing project. The first phase comprises two buildings with 239 apartments and is scheduled to be completed in 2028; later phases allow for buildings of up to eight stories in height and additional amenities, including a childcare center and retail spaces.

== History ==
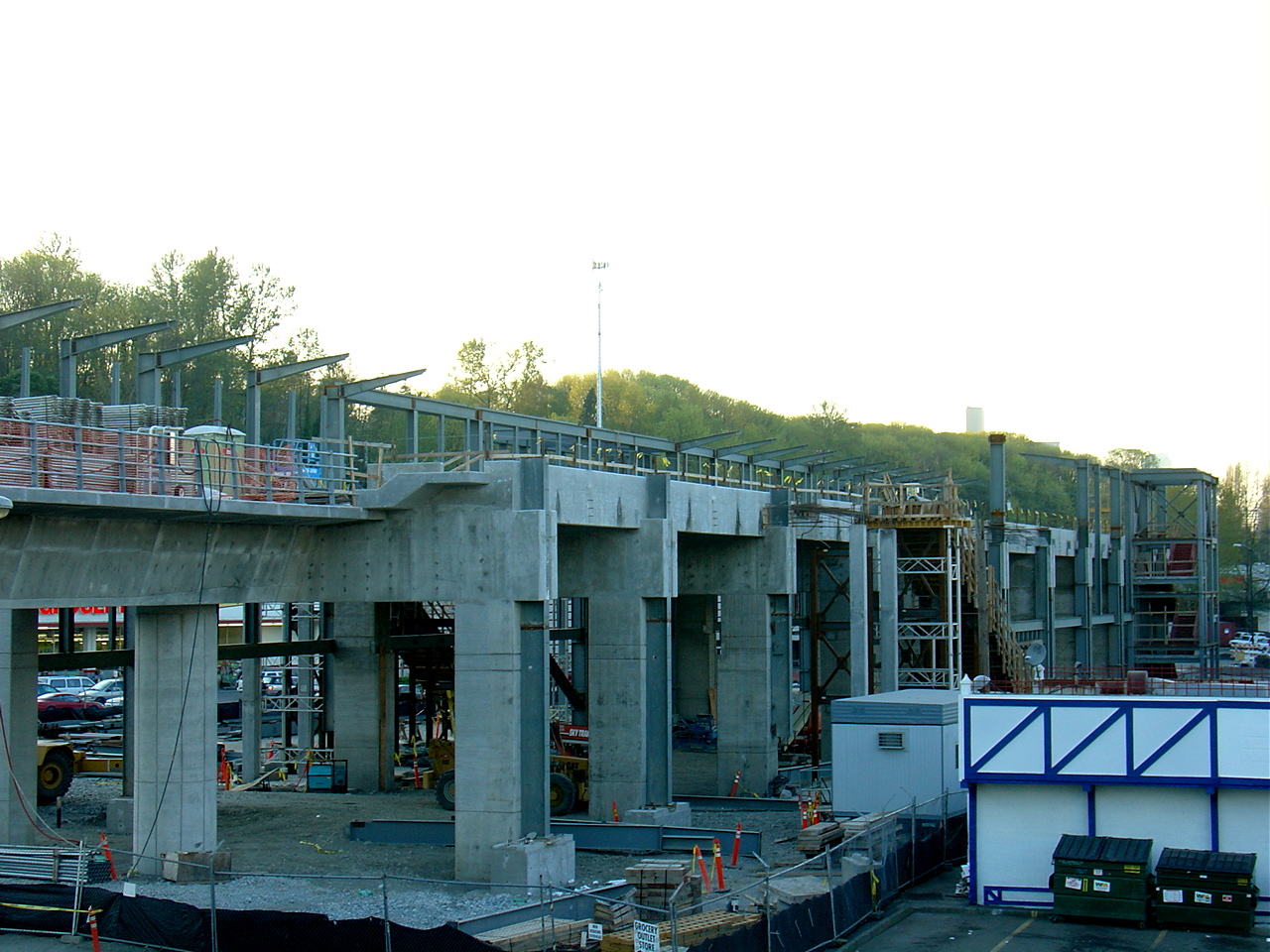
Mount Baker station under construction in April 2007

From 1891 to 1937, the Rainier Valley was served by the Rainier Avenue Electric Railway, an interurban railway on Rainier Avenue that traveled to Downtown Seattle, including a stop at McClellan Street in the vicinity of the modern light rail station. A failed rapid transit proposal published in 1928 by the Seattle Traffic Research Commission recommended that a future southern extension on Rainier Avenue terminate at either McClellan or Winthrop streets in Mount Baker.

A modern light rail system for Seattle was proposed in 1995, including a station at the intersection of Rainier Avenue and McClellan Street in Mount Baker. The proposal was rejected by voters on March 14, 1995, and was condensed into the "Sound Move" that was approved the following November, retaining the proposed station in Mount Baker. In 1999, Sound Transit, the agency charged with planning and constructing the light rail system, chose an elevated station at McClellan Street to be situated between a tunnel under Beacon Hill and a surface line on Martin Luther King Jr. Way as part of the Central Link route (now part of 1 Line). The light rail station, designed by Seattle-based Boxwood and engineered by Federal Way-based BergerABAM, was tentatively named "McClellan Street" and unveiled to the public alongside Beacon Hill station at public hearings held in 2003. The station was named "Mount Baker" after the surrounding neighborhood by the Sound Transit Board in January 2005.

Sound Transit awarded the construction contract for Mount Baker station and the Beacon Hill tunnel to Japanese firm Obayashi in June 2004 for $280 million, the costliest component of the Central Link project. Construction began in September 2005 with the permanent closure of Stevens Street and utility relocation to clear the station site. By the following April, Obayashi completed erection of columns that would be used to support the elevated guideway and station. Mount Baker station was declared substantially complete in June 2009, excluding work on the elevators and escalators.

Mount Baker station was opened to the public on July 18, 2009, during the first day of Central Link service. The station hosted the ribbon-cutting ceremony for the line and served as the point at which the inaugural trains met and departed with passengers. On June 4, 2026, a passenger vehicle was driven from street level onto the southbound tracks at the station and came to a stop near the platform. Light rail service was suspended for several hours until a mobile crane removed the vehicle.

== Station layout ==
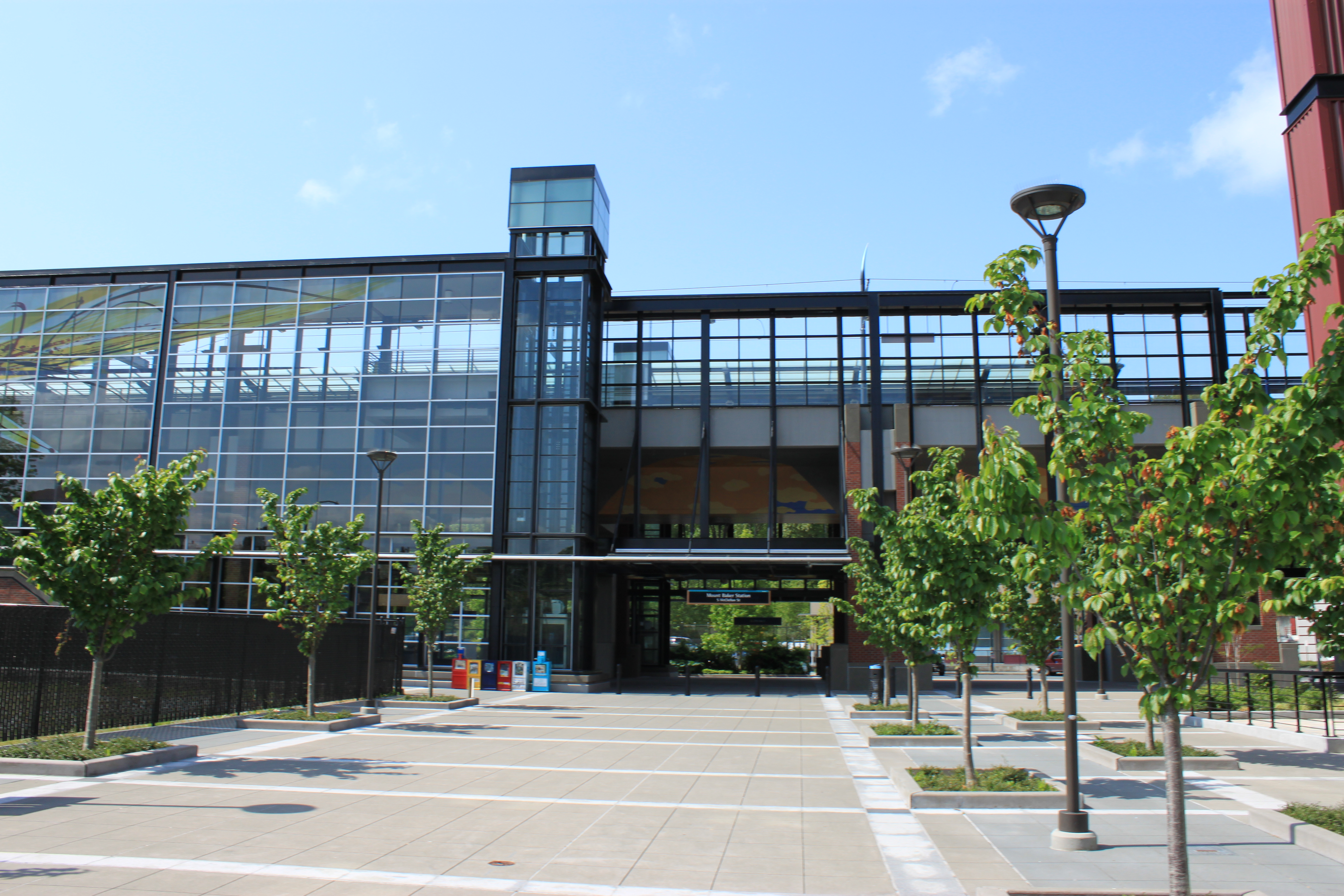
The east side of Mount Baker station, viewed from Martin Luther King Jr. Way

Mount Baker station, designed by architectural firm Boxwood and engineered by BergerABAM, consists of two elevated station platforms, a community plaza beneath the station building, and a nearby bus station. The 30,000-square-foot (2,800 m^{2}), brick-clad station building contains the 400-foot-long (120 m) side platforms situated 35 feet (11 m) above a plaza with ticket vending machines at ground level. The station also has 24 spaces in a secured bicycle locker.

The station also houses three art installations as part of the "STart" program, which allocates a percentage of project construction funds to art projects to be used in stations. Sheila Klein's "Sky Within" consists of six chandeliers, recycled from former street lights, that are suspended above the plaza level on the underside of the train guideway. The southbound platform has two stained glass windows made by Guy Kemper, facing away from the station and towards the surrounding neighborhood: "Rain, Steam and Speed" serves as a colorful contrast to clear and overcast skies, while "Seattle Sunrise" represents a sunrise against the horizon.

The station's former pictogram, which depicts two mountains

The station's former pictogram, a pair of mountains, depicted Mount Baker and Mount Rainier (both visible from the station). It was created by Christian French as part of the Stellar Connections series and its points represented nearby destinations, including Franklin High School, the former site of Sick's Stadium, Colman Park, Cheasty Boulevard, and Mount Baker Park. The pictogram series was retired in 2024 and replaced by station numbers.

== Services ==
Mount Baker station is part of Sound Transit's 1 Line, which runs from between Lynnwood, the University of Washington campus, Downtown Seattle, the Rainier Valley, Seattle–Tacoma International Airport, and Federal Way. It is the sixteenth southbound station from Lynnwood City Center and ninth northbound station from Federal Way Downtown; Mount Baker is situated between Beacon Hill and Columbia City stations. Trains serve the station twenty hours a day on weekdays and Saturdays, from 5:00 am to 1:00 am, and eighteen hours on Sundays, from 6:00 am to 12:00 am; during regular weekday service, trains operate roughly every eight to ten minutes during rush hour and midday operation, respectively, with longer headways of twelve to fifteen minutes in the early morning and at night. During weekends, Link trains arrive at Mount Baker station every ten minutes during midday hours and every twelve to fifteen minutes during mornings and evenings. The station is approximately 46 minutes from Lynnwood City Center station, 14 minutes from Westlake station in Downtown Seattle, and 23 minutes from SeaTac/Airport station. In 2025, an average of 2,575 passengers boarded Link trains at Mount Baker station on weekdays.

The station is also served by six King County Metro bus routes that stop at the Mount Baker Transit Center, a three-bay bus station located on Forest Street between Rainier Avenue and Martin Luther King Jr. Way that opened on September 19, 2009. Routes 7 and 9 Express run through the transit center, connecting the Rainier Valley to Downtown Seattle and Capitol Hill; Route 8 terminates at Mount Baker, running north to the Central District, Capitol Hill, and the Seattle Center in Uptown; Route 14 runs through the transit center, connecting Downtown and the Mount Baker area of the city (that the station was named after); Route 48 terminates at Mount Baker, running north to the University District via the Central District; Route 106, which begins in the International District, switches to local, frequent-stop service at Mount Baker, running on Martin Luther King Jr. Way South to Rainier Beach and towards Skyway and Renton. On weekends, a Trailhead Direct shuttle connects Mount Baker Transit Center to several popular hiking trails in the Issaquah Alps.
