= Beacon Hill station (Sound Transit) =

Light rail station in Seattle, Washington

56 Beacon Hill
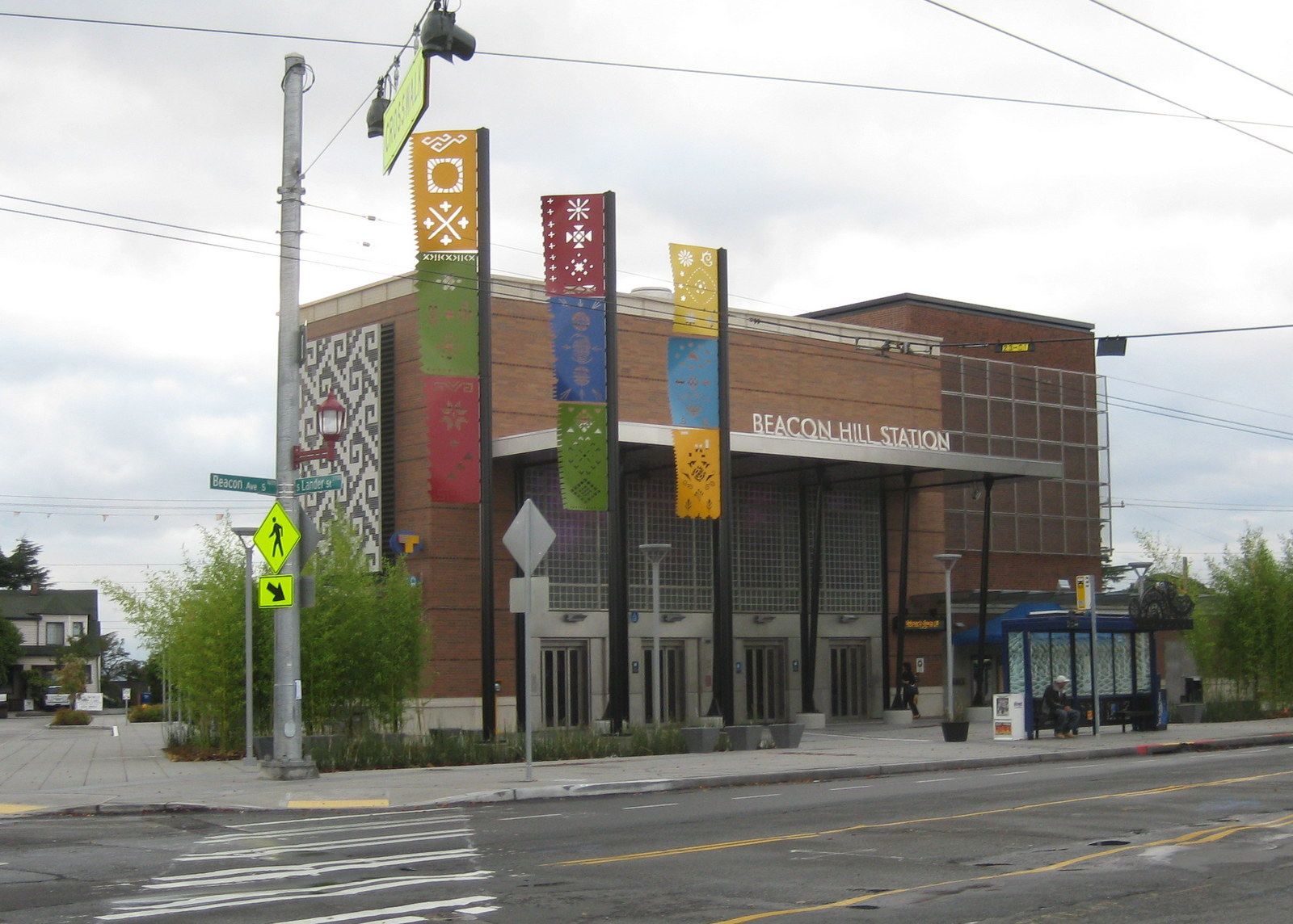
- The exterior of Beacon Hill station and its adjoining plaza

General information
- Location: 2702 Beacon Avenue South; Seattle, Washington; United States
- Coordinates: 47°34′46″N 122°18′41″W
- System: Link light rail
- Owner: Sound Transit
- Platforms: 1 split island platform
- Tracks: 2
- Connections: King County Metro

Construction
- Structure type: Underground
- Depth: 160 ft (49 m)
- Parking: Street parking nearby
- Cycle facilities: Lockers and parking cage
- Accessible: Yes

History
- Opened: July 18, 2009

Passengers
- 3,005 daily weekday boardings (2025); 1,037,890 total boardings (2025)

Services
Preceding station	Sound Transit	Following station
Link
SODO toward Lynnwood City Center	1 Line	Mount Baker toward Federal Way Downtown
Location

Beacon Hill station is a light rail station located in Seattle, Washington. It is situated between the Mount Baker and SODO stations on the 1 Line, which runs from Seattle–Tacoma International Airport to Downtown Seattle and the University of Washington as part of the Link light rail system. The station is located 160 feet (49 m) under the southeast corner of Beacon Avenue South and South Lander Street in Seattle's Beacon Hill neighborhood.

Beacon Hill station was first proposed in 1998 and was opened on July 18, 2009, as part of the inaugural Link line, after five years of tunnel boring and station construction. It consists of a single island platform, divided into two sections by the twin bores of the Beacon Hill Tunnel; four high-speed elevators ferry passengers from the platform to the surface entrance. Trains serve the station twenty hours a day on most days; the headway between trains is eight minutes during peak periods, with less frequent service at other times. The station is also served by three King County Metro bus routes that stop at a pair of sheltered bus stops on Beacon Avenue. It is the deepest station in Seattle.

== Location ==
Beacon Hill station is part of the Beacon Hill Tunnel, with its platform situated at a depth of 160 feet (49 m) and located under the intersection of Beacon Avenue South and South Lander Street. The station's only entrance is located at the southeast corner of the intersection, in the North Beacon Hill neighborhood of Seattle. The area surrounding the station consists of a mixture of low-density commercial and residential areas, housing a population of 6,081 people and businesses employing 1,453. El Centro de la Raza, a local social service agency, is situated north of the station complex and built 112 units of affordable housing adjacent to the station in 2016. The Beacon Hill branch of the Seattle Public Library is located two blocks south of the station, at the intersection of Beacon Avenue South and South Forest Street.

== History ==
=== Proposals and planning ===
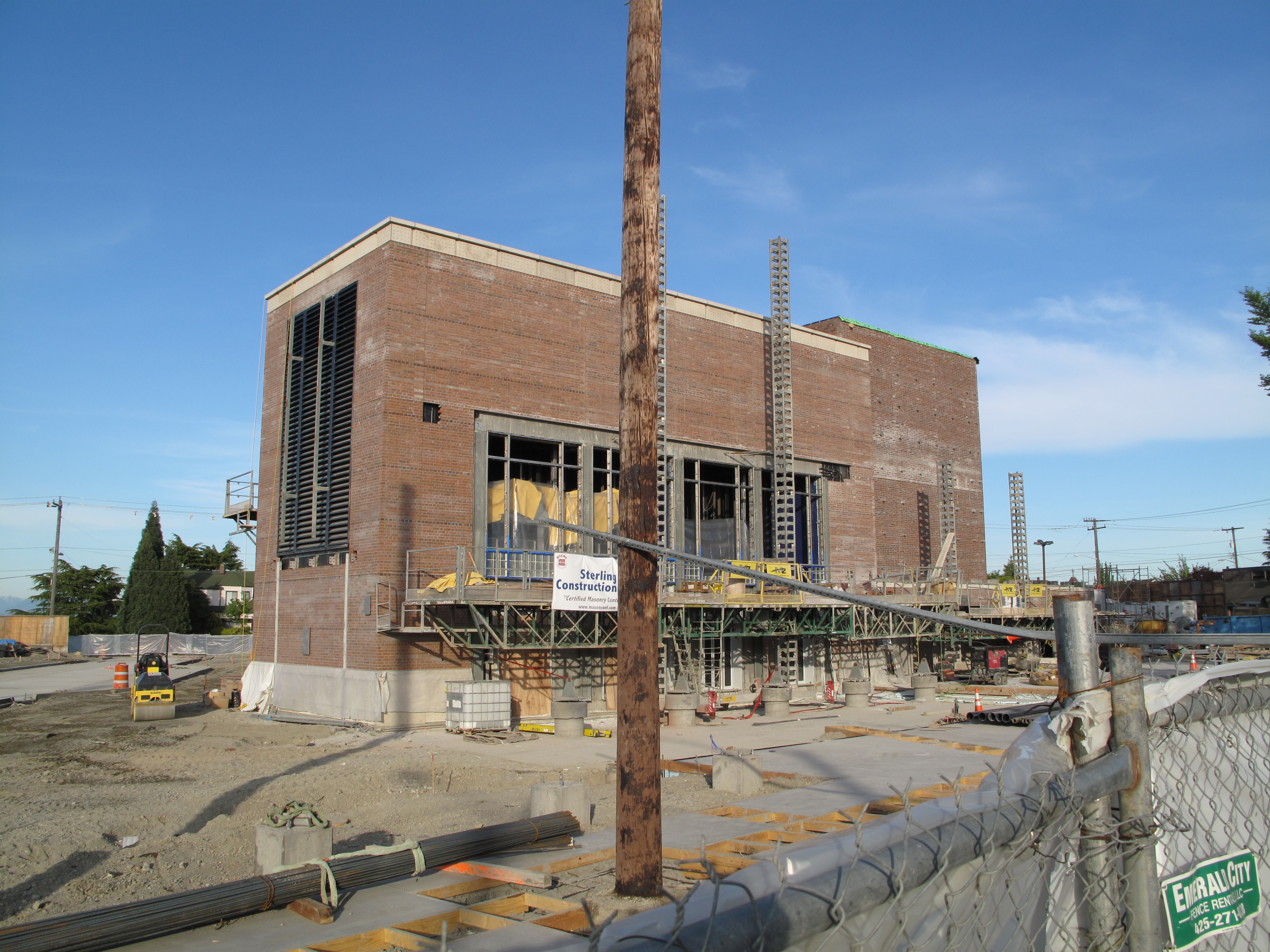
The Beacon Hill head house, under construction in May 2009

Several of the first proposals for rapid transit in the Seattle area included a north–south route from Downtown Seattle to Seattle–Tacoma International Airport that bypassed Beacon Hill in favor of a shorter route through Georgetown and South Park. The failed Forward Thrust initiatives of 1968 and 1970 proposed a heavy rail line between Downtown Seattle and Renton that ran along the Duwamish River through the Industrial District and Georgetown, serving Boeing Field, by 1985. A subsequent proposal, made by King County Metro and the Puget Sound Council of Governments in 1986, proposed a north–south line from Federal Way to Lynnwood that went through the Industrial District and Downtown Seattle, once again bypassing Beacon Hill. Light rail plans resurfaced in the mid-1990s under the newly formed Regional Transit Authority, later re-branded as Sound Transit, which preferred using South Dearborn Street and Rainier Avenue or Interstate 90 to connect the Rainier Valley to the International District and Downtown Seattle. The $3.9 billion (equivalent to $8.01 billion in 2025) Sound Move plan was approved by Sound Transit in May 1996 and by voters the following November, as a ten-year plan for Link light rail service from Northgate to Sea-Tac Airport beginning in 2006. The plan called for a segment in the Rainier Valley, using the express lanes of Interstate 90 on the north side of Beacon Hill to connect to the Downtown Seattle Transit Tunnel.

The Sound Transit Board passed a motion in May 1998 that modified the draft environmental impact statement for Central Link (now the 1 Line) to add "Route C1", which included a tunnel under Beacon Hill between Interstate 5 and McClellan Street Station, as well as elevated approaches along Massachusetts Street and Rainier Avenue South at the west and east portals of the tunnel, respectively. Additional plans for a station in the Beacon Hill Tunnel were put on hold in November 1998, with the Sound Transit Board deciding to build the station structure and entry shaft within the available budget to allow for minimal disruptions to light rail service while the station was being constructed after the line opened. The construction of surface-level stations at Royal Brougham Way, later Stadium station, and South Graham Street in the Rainier Valley were also deferred, as part of $200 million in cuts to bring the project within its original $1.8 billion budget (equivalent to $387 million and $3.48 billion, respectively, in 2025) to build a truncated Central Link from Sea-Tac Airport to the University District.

=== Construction ===
The drilling of a 18-foot-diameter (5.5 m) test shaft for the Beacon Hill Tunnel at the present station site began in April 2003, several months before the official Link groundbreaking in SoDo, finding that the base of the hill is composed of stable clay, while the upper sections have several layers of glacial deposits from the most recent ice age. The station's design and art installations were revealed during a month-long exhibit at the El Centro de la Raza, located adjacent to the station site. The South China Restaurant, a Chinese restaurant and bar that was located on the Beacon Hill station site since the 1950s, was demolished in preparation for construction of the station shafts in February 2004.

Sound Transit awarded the tunnel-boring contract to the Obayashi Corporation, one of the largest Japanese general contractors, for $280 million with a $20 million contingency, an estimated $42 million more than expected by the agency. Obayashi and the Beacon Hill Constructors were the only firms to compete for the Beacon Hill Tunnel and Station contract, the latter bidding $305 million. Beginning in March 2005, workers excavated of two 180-foot-deep (55 m), 46-foot-wide (14 m) vertical shafts using a technique utilizing a concrete "slurry wall" cylinder and pumping in cement grout to stabilize soils. The tunnel itself was mined using a 360-short-ton (720,000 lb; 330,000 kg) tunnel boring machine sporting a 21-foot (6.4 m) diameter drill, with 150 blades rotating at 1.5 rpm whilst moving at a maximum of 50 feet (15 m) per day, custom-built for the project by Mitsubishi Heavy Industries in Kobe, Japan. Nicknamed the "Emerald Mole" during a contest for children in late 2005, the drill was launched during a public ceremony on January 18, 2006 held at the west portal of the tunnel on the west side of Beacon Hill, below Interstate 5, where the TBM started excavating. Construction at the station site was briefly interrupted for an hour in May by 17 protesters demanding contracts for businesses owned by African Americans, the only such incident at the construction area.

The only fatality on the Central Link project occurred on February 7, 2007, near the west portal of the northbound Beacon Hill Tunnel, where 49-year-old mechanic Michael Merryman was thrown from a supply train after it collided with an unoccupied locomotive, also injuring another worker who was released from a local hospital the following day with minor injuries. The accident prompted the public release of an ongoing Sound Transit audit of Obayashi in addition to an investigation led by the Washington State Department of Labor and Industries into workplace safety at the tunnel site. The Sound Transit audit, which began after a previous supply train accident the previous October, released a report days after the accident that recommended unannounced brake inspections and criticized Obayashi's Beacon Hill managers for not participating in safety meetings and inspections; the report also blamed frequent employee turnover for the lack of safety awareness. Obayashi was fined $29,000 for the accident in addition to other workplace violations, ranging from failure to properly train the workers operating the supply trains to a lack of a bumper stop to prevent train collisions. Another controversy emerged during tunnel construction shortly after work began in December 2004, when caustic mud found at a landfill was traced back to the Beacon Hill Tunnel project by a state inspection. The contamination was determined to have originated in the jet grout, a highly alkaline substance, used to solidify dirt around the vertical station shafts during the early stages of station construction. Obayashi decontaminated nearly 60,000 cubic yards (46,000 m^{3}) of dirt and debris dumped at a sand mine in Maple Valley at a cost of $2.4 million.

After 17 months of drilling, "Emerald Mole" broke through the east side of Beacon Hill, near the site of Mount Baker station, on May 9, 2007 to complete the 4,300-foot-long (1,300 m) southbound tunnel. The tunnel boring machine was dismantled and trucked west to SoDo, where it was reassembled the following month and launched again in July, completing the northbound tunnel on March 5, 2008 and re-emerging within 5 millimeters (0.2 in) of its target. Obayashi finished its excavation of the station site, including the main and emergency shafts, ventilation tubes and passenger crossover tunnels, in late June; construction of the station shafts progressed slowly, digging up to 5 feet (1.5 m) at a time, before the final concrete wall and waterproof lining were installed.

=== Opening ===
Beacon Hill station opened to the public on July 18, 2009 during a weekend of free service celebrating the inaugural day of Central Link service. The line's opening was delayed from its projected July 3 date due in part to slowdowns in Beacon Hill construction. The year after the line opened, nine air pockets above the tunnel, caused by soil slides above the tunnel boring machine, were discovered and filled with cement to prevent sinkholes.

During a winter storm in January 2012, an overnight train running to keep the overhead catenary free of ice stalled inside the Beacon Hill Tunnel, allowing for ice build up that canceled Link service for several hours. In late 2013, the station was closed for two hours after the discovery of smoke in the tunnel, station, and nearby Mount Baker Station, coming from a homeless encampment on the west side of Beacon Hill. The incident prompted Sound Transit to hold meetings with the Seattle Fire Department on preventing a total system shut-down in the event of an electrical fire. The station was closed for one-day periods in January 2016 and October 2019 after multiple elevators were out of service; the incident in October 2019 saw all four elevators shut down for several hours. A ventilation fan issue in the tunnel caused a one-day closure on August 6, 2025, to comply with fire code requirements; trains were unable to travel through the station for several hours until non-stop service was restored in the afternoon.

== Station layout ==
The northbound platform at Beacon Hill station

Beacon Hill station was designed by architectural firm Otak and built by a joint venture between engineering firms Hatch Mott MacDonald and Jacobs Engineering Group. The station building houses entrances to four high-speed elevators that travel 160 feet (49 m) to platform level in 20 seconds. Beacon Hill's 400-foot-long (120 m) split island platform is located between the two Beacon Hill Tunnel tubes, with a small cross-tunnel passageway between the two sections of the platform. It serves 1 Line's two tracks; the northbound tracks serves trains to Lynnwood City Center, while the southbound tracks serves trains to Federal Way Downtown. As with all Link stations, electronic information signs above the platform offer real-time information about train arrivals and service alerts, in addition to announcements over an intercom. Beacon Hill's bus stops are located south of the station building on Beacon Avenue, with the northbound stop located adjacent to the station and the southbound stop accessible via a signaled crosswalk. The station does not include public parking, but is within walking distance of several private parking lots that require payment. ORCA card vending machines are located outside the station building, along with bicycle lockers and a bicycle cage with space for 48 bicycles. Emergency staircases and the ventilation shaft are capped by the east headhouse, located behind the station building and plaza on South Lander Street.

Hatch Mott MacDonald and Jacobs Engineering Group were awarded the 2010 Engineering Excellence Platinum Award by the Washington branch of the American Council of Engineering Companies for designing and constructing the Beacon Hill Tunnel and Station.

=== Art ===
The station's former pictogram, which depicts a kite

Beacon Hill houses several art installations as part of the "STart" program, which allocates a percentage of project construction funds to art projects to be used in stations. Located outside the station building, Carl Smool's Common Threads: Community Patterns is divided into three elements: etched "carpets" in the plaza's sidewalks, three colorful cut-metal banners in front of the station entrance, and an Aztec-patterned vent screen facing the El Centro de la Raza. The entire metal banners installation was removed in March 2011 after one of the poles fell during high winds, but was restored in August 2012. A second windstorm in 2014 damaged the sculpture's foundation, which was rebuilt and reinstalled in 2017.

Two sculptures made by Dan Corson were installed at the station's underground level: Portals consists of a wall of portals with images from the Hubble Space Telescope, microscopes, and the deep sea at the elevator lobby; Space Forms is a series of brightly-colored, translucent sculptures suspended above the platforms that resemble microscopic creatures floating under a microscope. An additional installation, Bill Bell's Light Sticks, is embedded in the walls of the Beacon Hill Tunnel. A series of LED displays, typically showing images of playing cards, flash for 1/30th of a second through the train windows. The art is considered by Sound Transit an extension of Bell's installation at the University Street station that similarly depends on persistence of vision to project subliminal images.

The station's former pictogram, a kite, represented the neighborhood's community spaces. It was created by Christian French as part of the Stellar Connections series and its points represented nearby destinations, including El Centro de la Raza, the Beacon Hill Branch Library, the Beacon Hill Reservoir, and the 12th Avenue Viewpoint. The pictogram series was retired in 2024 and replaced by station numbers.

== Services ==
Beacon Hill station is part of Sound Transit's 1 Line, which runs from between Lynnwood, the University of Washington campus, Downtown Seattle, the Rainier Valley, Seattle–Tacoma International Airport, and Federal Way. It is the fifteenth southbound station from Lynnwood City Center and tenth northbound station from Federal Way Downtown; Beacon Hill is situated between SODO and Mount Baker stations. Trains serve the station twenty hours a day on weekdays and Saturdays, from 5:00 am to 1:00 am, and eighteen hours on Sundays, from 6:00 am to 12:00 am; during regular weekday service, trains operate roughly every eight to ten minutes during rush hour and midday operation, respectively, with longer headways of twelve to fifteen minutes in the early morning and at night. During weekends, Link trains arrive at Beacon Hill station every ten minutes during midday hours and every twelve to fifteen minutes during mornings and evenings. The station is approximately 44 minutes from Lynnwood City Center station, 12 minutes from Westlake station in Downtown Seattle, and 25 minutes from SeaTac/Airport station. The final northbound 1 Line trips during late evenings terminate at Beacon Hill. In 2025, an average of 3,005 passengers boarded Link trains at Beacon Hill station on weekdays.

The station is also served by three bus routes operated by King County Metro that use bus stops adjacent to the station: Route 36, an electric trolleybus route, runs along Beacon Avenue from Othello station to the International District and Downtown; Route 60 runs between West Seattle, Georgetown, Beacon Hill, First Hill and Capitol Hill; and Route 107, which terminates at the station and travels southeasterly to Georgetown, Rainier Beach station, Skyway and Renton.
