= Beacon Hill tunnel (Seattle) =

Rail tunnels in Seattle, Washington, United States

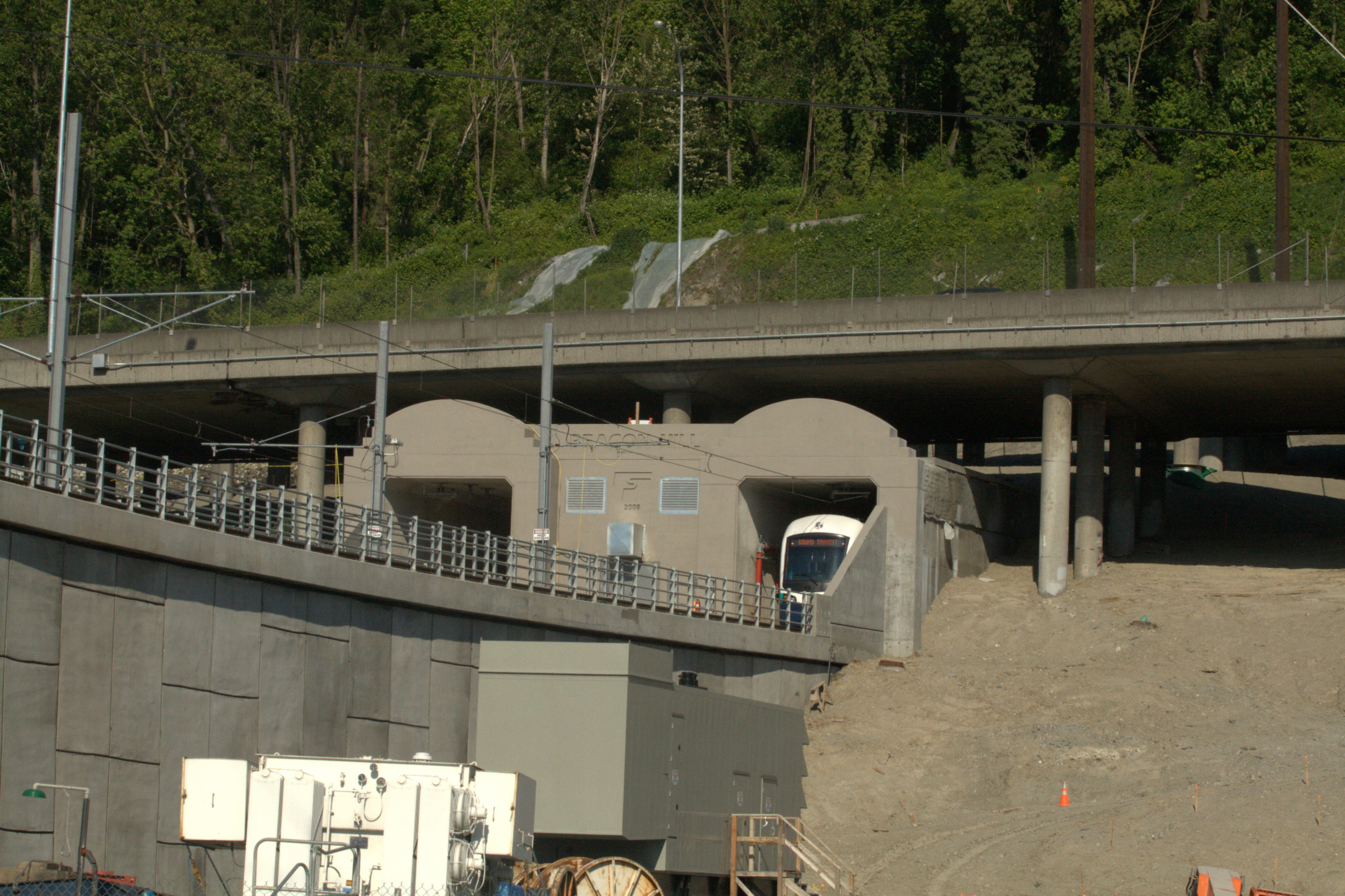
- Tunnel's west portal under an elevated portion of Interstate 5
- Interactive map of Beacon Hill tunnel

Overview
- Location: Seattle, Washington
- Coordinates: 47.577°N 122.320°W
- Status: Active
- Start: SoDo, Seattle, Washington
- End: Rainier Valley, Seattle, Washington near Mount Baker station

Operation
- Constructed: 2005–2009
- Owner: Sound Transit
- Traffic: Link light rail (1 Line)

Technical
- Length: 1 mi (1.6 km)
- Tunnel clearance: 21 ft (6.4 m)
- Width: 21 ft (6.4 m)

Beacon Hill tunnel is a public transit tunnel in Seattle, Washington, carrying light rail trains on the 1 Line under Seattle's Beacon Hill between Rainier Valley and SoDo just east of Interstate 5. The Beacon Hill Link Light Rail station is approximately 160 feet (49 m) underground near the midpoint of the tunnel.

== Construction ==
Construction of the tunnel began in March 2005 and was completed in July 2009. Obayashi Corporation was the general contractor. The twin running tunnels were excavated with a tunnel boring machine (TBM) built by Mitsubishi, named the "Emerald Mole." The station and crossover tunnels were constructed using the sequential excavation method (SEM), also known as the New Austrian tunnelling method (NATM).

Several workers were injured and one was killed during construction of the tunnel.

The tunnel was completed at a cost of $309 million, versus Obayashi's bid of $280 million.
