= Beacon Hill Branch Library =

Library in Seattle, Washington, U.S.

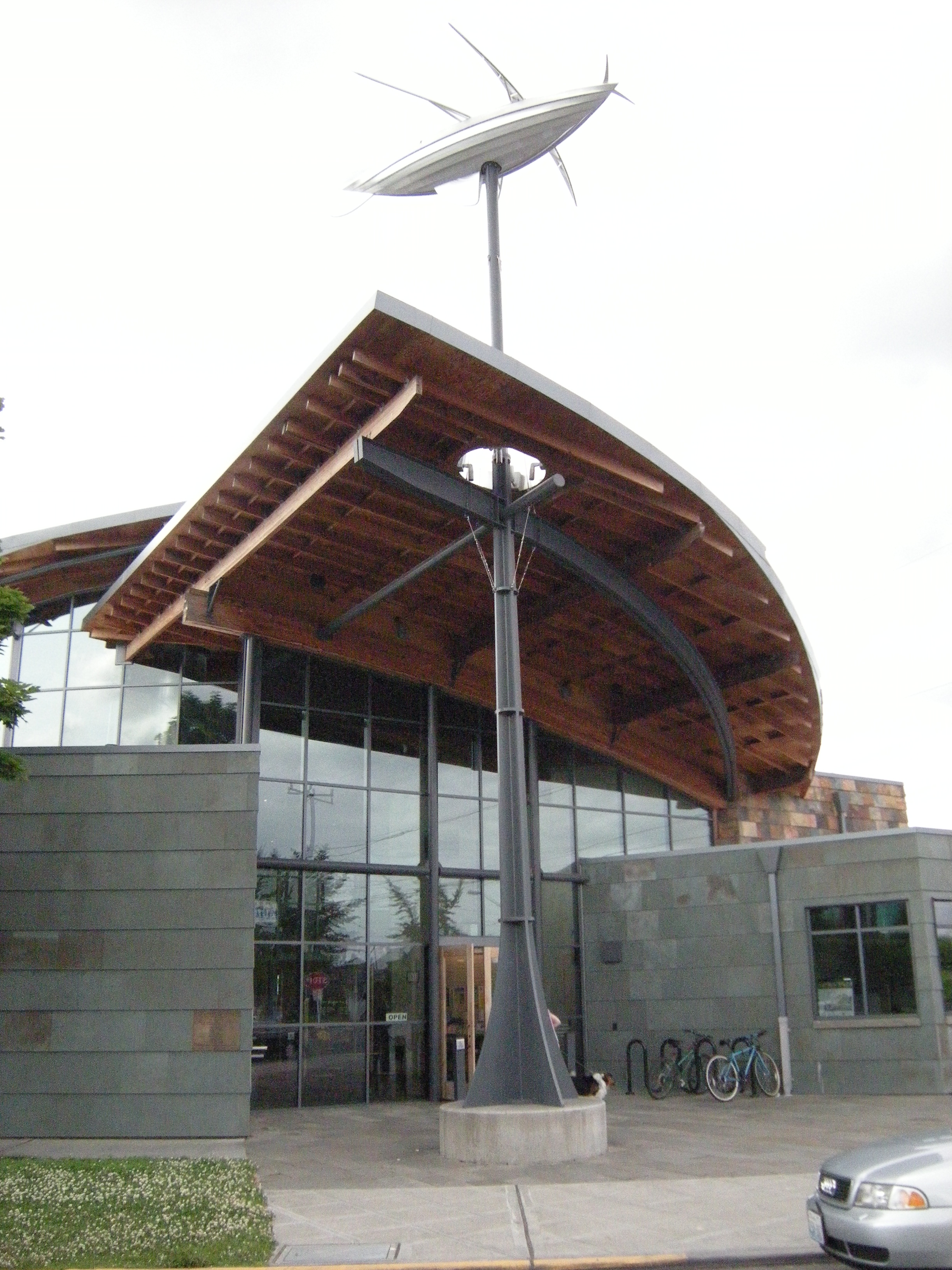
- Beacon Hill Branch exterior and entrance
- Interactive map of the Beacon Hill Branch Library area

General information
- Type: Library
- Location: Beacon Hill, Seattle, Washington, US, 2821 Beacon Ave. South
- Coordinates: 47.5780°N 122.3115°W
- Opened: July 10, 2004
- Renovated: 2017
- Cost: $5.3 million
- Renovation cost: $696,000
- Owner: Seattle Public Library

Technical details
- Size: Over 40,000 books
- Floor area: 10,400 square feet (970 m^{2}) or 10,800 square feet (1,000 m^{2})

Design and construction
- Architect: Carlson
- Main contractor: Steele Corp.

Website
- Seattle Public Library
- Building design and engineering notes from SPL unless noted

The Beacon Hill Branch Library is a branch of the Seattle Public Library in the Beacon Hill neighborhood.

Beacon Hill is one of five branches, all south of the Lake Washington Ship Canal, that saw declining use in the 2010s, possibly because job-seekers in the city's less affluent southern half had been using libraries during Seattle's 2008-2012 recession.

== History ==
Beacon Hill Branch was housed in a number of locations, including a location at 2519 15th Avenue South converted to a library in 1962. It was described as "the poster child for Seattle's worn-out library system", a "crumbling 1920s-era variety store with more books than shelves to hold them". A new library was funded by a "Libraries for All" bond in 1998. The building opened in 2004 and included stone from the same quarry as the downtown Central Library.

In 2017, the library underwent a $696,000 renovation to increase the number of electrical outlets for digital devices and add a "laptop bar", install LED lighting, de-clutter the checkout area, and make other improvements for patrons.

== Public art ==
Public art installed at the library includes The Dream Ship: Beacon Hill Discovery, a kinetic sculpture atop a spire rising through a hole in the roof at the building's entrance. Other pieces include haiku carved in stones and rain scuppers shaped like ravens' beaks. These and certain elements of the interior design were called "phony multiculturalism" by a critic for Seattle's The Stranger weekly newspaper. Four years after the opening, the Seattle Post-Intelligencer said of another Seattle library design that it "shuns architectural drama" unlike the Beacon Hill and other contemporaries.
