= Fifth Church of Christ, Scientist (Seattle) =

Coordinates: 47°33′38″N 122°17′15″W

- U.S. Historic district – Contributing property
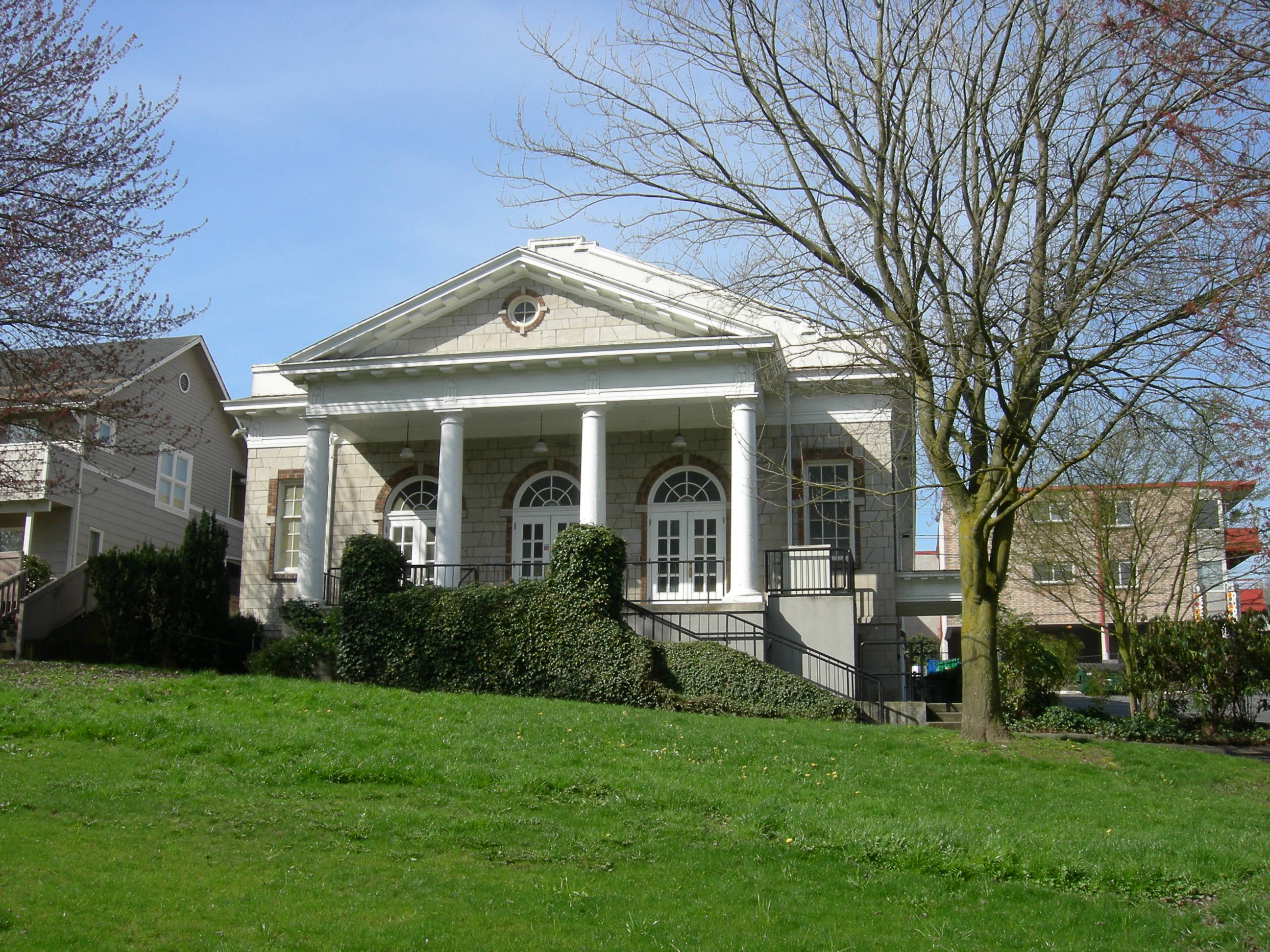
- The former Fifth Church of Christ, Scientist. Now the Rainier Arts Center
- Location: 3515 S Alaska St. Seattle, Washington
- Built: 1921
- Architect: Earl A. Roberts
- Architectural style: Greek Revival, Neo-Palladian
- Part of: Columbia City Historic District (ID80004000)
- Designated CP: September 8, 1980

The former Fifth Church of Christ, Scientist, located at 3515 South Alaska Street (corner of 36th Avenue, South) in the Columbia City neighborhood in the Rainier Valley area of Seattle, Washington, is a historic Christian Science church edifice, whose original entrance was on 36th Avenue. South. Built in 1921. was designed by Earl A. Roberts in the Greek Revival and Neo-Palladian styles. It is a contributing property in the Columbia City Historic District, which was added to the National Register of Historic Places on September 8, 1980. Fifth Church is no longer in existence. The building is now the Rainier Arts Center. The only major exterior change made by the center was the relocation of the front entrance to Alaska Street.

== See also ==
- List of former Christian Science churches, societies and buildings
