= StarMetro (bus service) =

Public bus service in Tallahassee, Florida

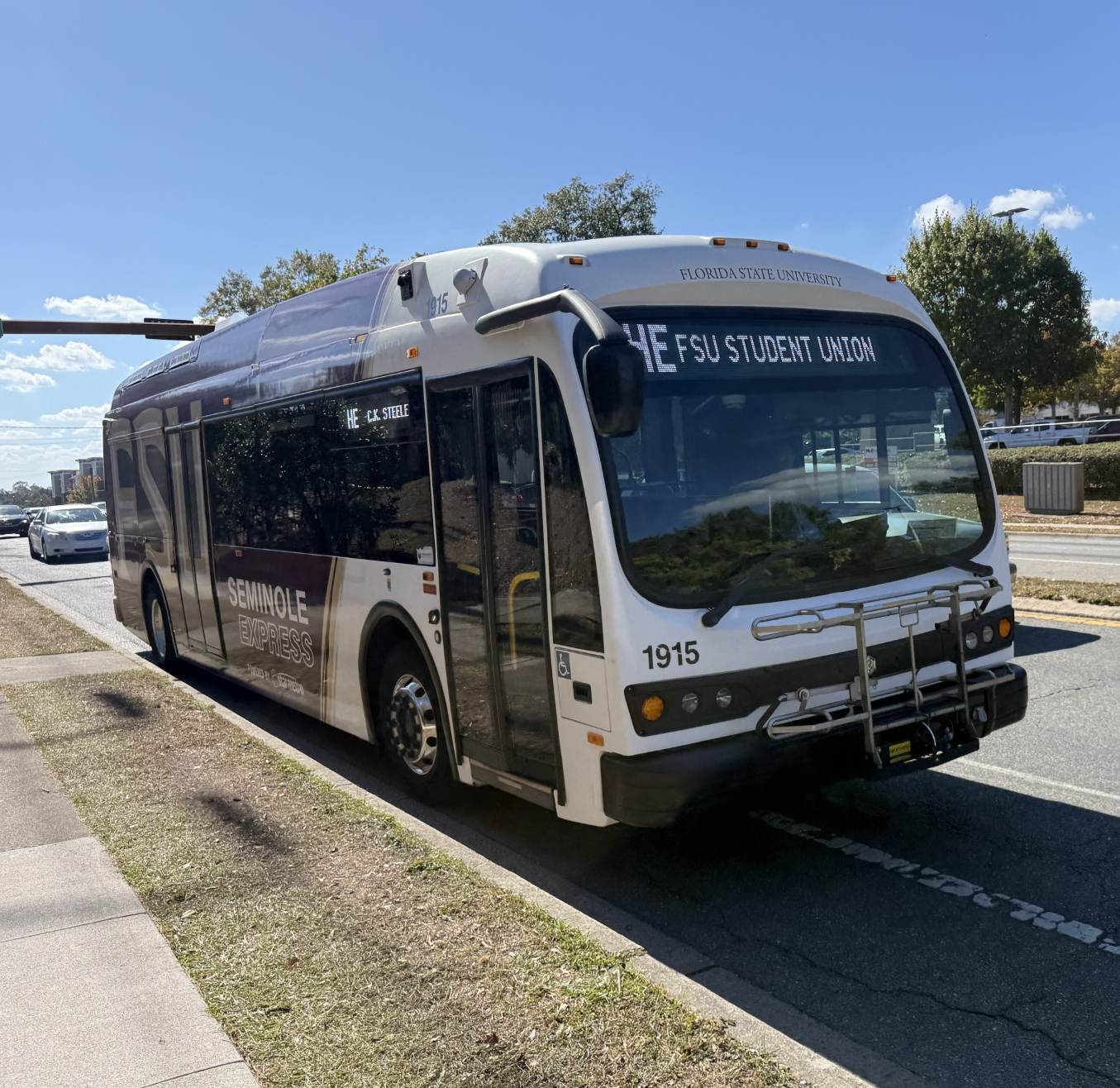
- Founded: December 3, 1973 (as TalTran)
- Headquarters: Tallahassee, Florida
- Service area: Tallahassee, Florida
- Service type: Bus
- Routes: 14 weekday, 9 Saturday, 4 Sunday/nights
- Hubs: 1
- Stations: C.K. Steele Plaza
- Fleet: 55 buses
- Annual ridership: 2.4 million (2022)
- Fuel type: Clean Diesel, CNG, Battery-electric
- Operator: City of Tallahassee
- Website: www.talgov.com/starmetro

StarMetro is the city-owned and operated public bus service for Tallahassee, Florida, and was previously known as TalTran.

StarMetro operates both fixed-route and dial-a-ride service in the Tallahassee metropolitan area with a focus on sustainability and innovation. StarMetro received multiple federal grants between 2011 and 2023 to purchase battery-electric buses and construct new transit facilities.

== History ==
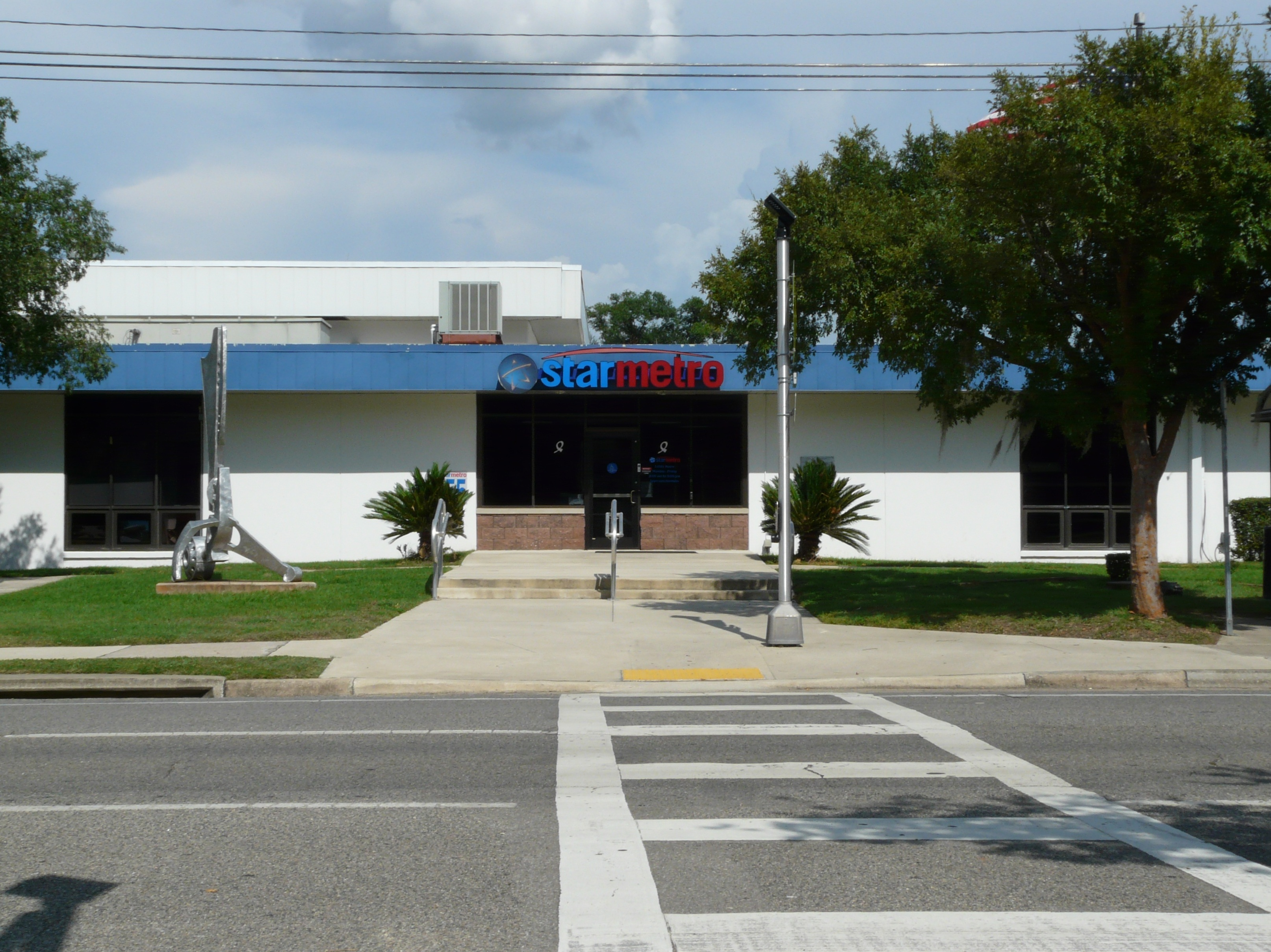
StarMetro administration building

On December 3, 1973, the City of Tallahassee purchased the public transit system from Cities Transit Company, renamed it “Taltran” and began operating fixed-route transportation with a fleet of 21 buses and a fare of $0.30. Taltran and Florida State University started the Seminole Express that same year, providing transportation to, around, and from campus to surrounding areas in Tallahassee.

In 1976, the city constructed an administration and maintenance building at 555 Appleyard Drive. The city began offering Dial-A-Ride service in 1984 and in 1986 completed construction of C.K. Steele Bus Plaza.

In 2005, TalTran changed its name to StarMetro and launched a new era called the "Reinaissance Project". From 2006 to 2009, StarMetro implemented a series of system improvements, including new routes and stops, upgrades to existing stops, and GPS-enabled buses with live locations available in trip planning apps and on the Internet. Improvements at C.K. Steele Bus Plaza included minor renovations, free wireless internet, and the installation of information kiosks.

In 2011, StarMetro implemented a complete route overhaul dubbed "Nova2010", which reduced the current system to 11 routes, of which only 4 were intended to meet at CK Steele Plaza. The routes ran at closer intervals than before while providing transfer points all over the city — no longer requiring all two-bus trips to transfer at CK Steele Plaza. The Nova2010 project was met with public backlash, with many patrons feeling dissatisfied with the level of public engagement.

In 2012, The Federal Transit Administration awarded StarMetro over $5 million from the Transit Investments for Greenhouse Gas and Energy Reduction (TIGGER) II grant to pursue electric buses. StarMetro purchased five electric buses with this funding.

In 2013, StarMetro sought public input and reverted to a hub-and-spoke system with all but one route (Live Oak) meeting at C.K. Steele Bus Plaza to facilitate transfers. In following years, StarMetro introduced FLEX, a form of neighborhood microtransit operating in two distinct areas.

In 2017, StarMetro received a $1 million federal grant to purchase 15 new electric buses. The city signed a 10-year contract with FSU and transitioned to a fully electric campus fleet in 2019. That same year, the STAR Program (Student Transportation for Academics and Responsibilities) codified a long-standing city policy that allowed K-12 students to ride free on public transportation.

StarMetro installed a new fare collection system in 2020, which streamlined and enhanced payment options for customers, including a ticket vending machine, smart cards with eFares, and the ability to purchase fares using apps like Token Transit and Moovit.

=== COVID-19 response ===
In response to the COVID-19 pandemic, StarMetro implemented the following changes:

- Capped bus capacity at 20 passengers to facilitate social distancing
- Required masks/face coverings to be worn while on the bus
- Suspended trolley services
- Weekday service ends at 8:00 pm
- Suspended FSU campus routes from March through August
- Installed driver barriers

After the mask mandate was lifted in March 2022, service and hours generally returned to normal. However, the suspended trolley service was never reintroduced and the driver barriers are still in use.

=== Current Developments ===
In 2021, StarMetro staff began pursuing the construction of the Southside Transit Center, which will be located on the northwest corner of Orange Avenue and Meridian Road. The new transfer center will require another restructuring of the StarMetro Fixed Route System. StarMetro began its Think Transit Campaign in 2021 to solicit public feedback on the design and construction of the Southside Transit Center and revised fixed route system. Outreach is spearheaded by StarMetro with the help of a consulting firm who suggested route adjustments and new routes based on feedback from the initial phases. Phase four is ongoing and actively seeking responses and feedback for these proposals.

== Routes ==
StarMetro operates every day of the year except for Thanksgiving and Christmas Day. Weekday service consists of 14 regularly scheduled fixed-routes, two flex-routes, and one express route that operates during peak travel times. The "Saturday" schedule consists of 12 of the weekday routes, typically with the earliest trip eliminated and/or the headway reduced. The "Sunday" schedule consists of a completely separate system of four routes that is not as extensive as the weekday/Saturday routes. The Sunday route system is also run on weekday and Saturday nights (7:00 p.m. to 9:00 p.m.). All weekday and Saturday routes are named for Tallahassee area locations and symbols while the Sunday routes are numbered.

=== Campus Routes ===
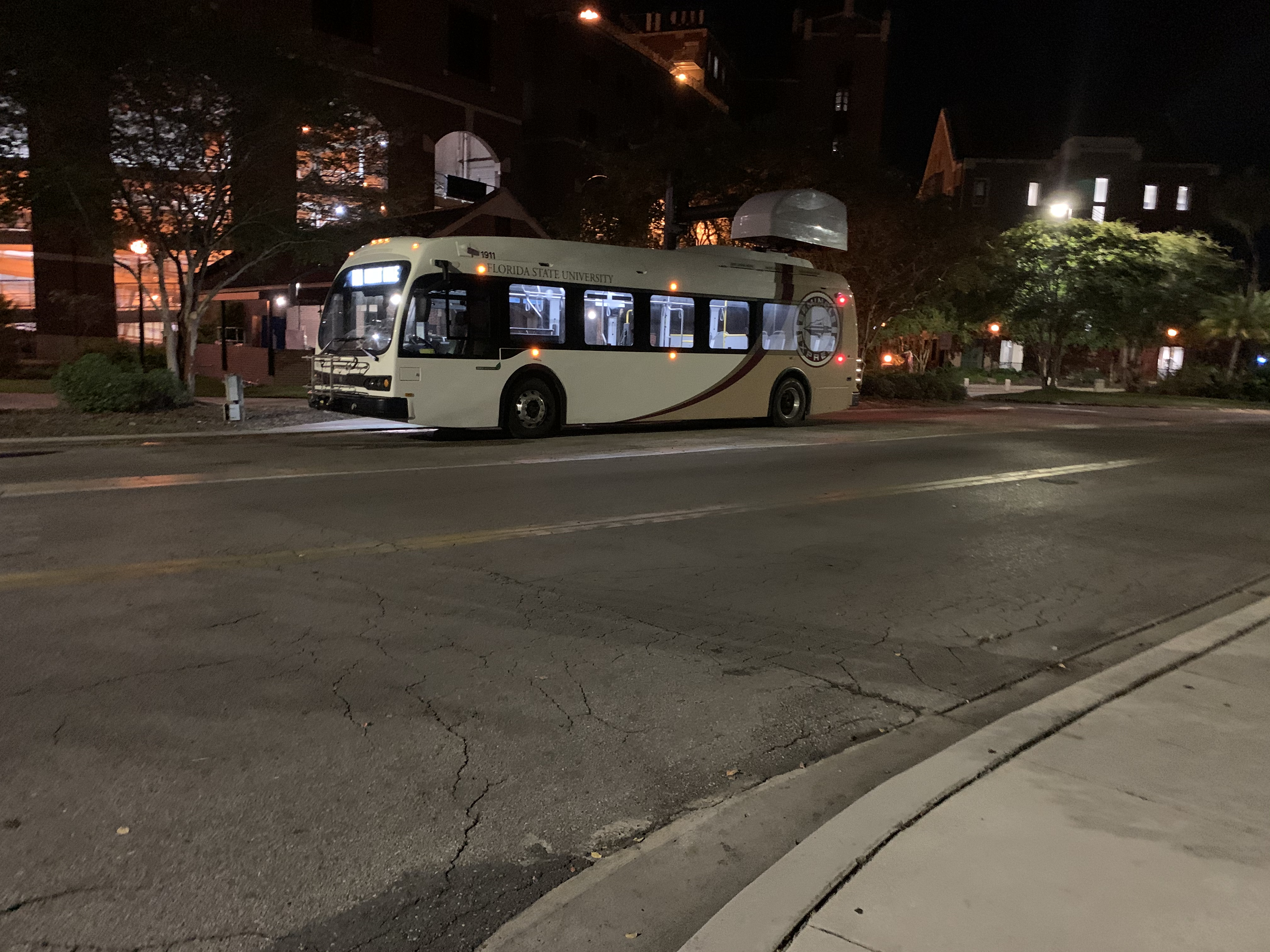
The Nite Nole charging on its layover at the UCA bus stop.

StarMetro operates seven fixed routes on the campus of Florida State University (FSU) when class is in session with the exception of the Night Nole, which operates late into the night during the fall and spring semesters.

StarMetro has been providing campus transportation to FSU since 1973. These routes are free to the public and connect campus with nearby student housing facilities. In Fall 2019, FSU signed a 10-year contract with StarMetro to continue providing campus bus services. As part of the new contract, StarMetro purchased all electric buses to run exclusively on FSU campus routes. In 2017, each Proterra XR-Plus bus costs approximately $719,000 with a battery lease.

Beginning in the Fall 2020 semester, campus bus routes and times were altered in order to prepare for electric buses across all routes, as the electric buses need some down-time to charge while in service. FSU installed two overhead charging stations at the Doak Campbell Stadium bus stop and at Stadium Drive and Spirit Way, and StarMetro installed an overhead charging station at C.K. Steele Bus Plaza. Currently, the university pays StarMetro a fee of $91.45/bus/hour to operate campus routes.

All campus routes were temporarily discontinued in March 2020 when the university closed due to COVID-19. Campus routes reopened in August 2020, with limited capacity and service. Service resumed normal operations in Fall 2021.

StarMetro used to provide fixed routes on the Florida A&M University campus, but this was discontinued when the institution decided not to renew its contract with the agency and began providing campus shuttle services in-house.

== Programs and Services ==
=== FLEX routes ===
StarMetro offers two "FLEX" routes. FLEX is a call-ahead curb-to-curb service allows riders to be picked up and dropped off at any location within the designated FLEX zone, and includes free transfers to the regular fixed route. Riders must call StarMetro two hours before they wish to be picked up in order to use the FLEX routes.

This service connects residents in the Lake Jackson area to the Lake Jackson town center, where riders can transfer to the Big Bend and Forest routes. In the Southside area, riders can connect to multiple points of interest on the Southside or connect to the Gulf, Live Oak, Moss, Southwood and Dogwood routes. Southside residents will also be able to use the FLEX to connect to the Southside Transit Center, which is slated for construction in 2025.

=== Dial-A-Ride ===
StarMetro's special transportation programs, collectively known as Dial-A-Ride, primarily provide next-day service for riders with disabilities or who are otherwise transportation dependent. Riders can schedule their rides online or over the phone up to fourteen days in advance. The service costs $2.50 per ride.

Dial-A-Ride originally started in 1984 in response to the Rehabilitation Act of 1973, but it now falls under the Americans with Disabilities Act of 1990 (ADA) and other federal regulations for Special Transportation. Dial-A-Ride provides complementary ADA service to residents with a qualifying disability that live within 3/4 mile of StarMetro's fixed route system.

==== Community Transportation Services ====
In 2002, Taltran became the Community Transportation Coordinator (CTC) for Leon County. StarMetro's CTC Program coordinates next-day service for riders who qualify as transportation disadvantaged. This program is overseen by the Florida Commission for the Transportation Disadvantaged (CTD) and funded by the Transportation Disadvantaged Trust Fund.

CTC services are provided concurrently with complementary ADA services. The Application for Transportation Assistance, available on StarMetro's website, enables residents to apply for both programs at the same time. The ADA only requires service provided in the area and hours where fixed route service is available, but the CTC program allows Dial-A-Ride to operate with expanded hours and areas where regular fixed route service is not available. Dial-A-Ride Hours of Operation:

- Weekdays, 5 a.m. to 10 p.m.
- Saturdays, 6 a.m. to 10 p.m.
- Sundays, 6 a.m. to 6 p.m.
- Certain holidays are excluded.

=== Student Transportation for Academics and Responsibilities (STAR) Program ===
STAR Program offers fare-free access to public transportation for K-12 students attending school in Leon County as long as they have a program agreement on file signed by the student and a parent, legal guardian, or other responsible adult. The program codified a long-standing city policy providing free fares to K-12 students in Leon County, introducing a student code of conduct and reusable STAR cards in partnership with Leon County Schools.

Students in grades 6-12 may ride independently. Students in kindergarten through fifth grade must be accompanied by an older sibling (at least sixth grade), legal guardian or parental designee. Without a STAR card, K-12 students may ride for a reduced $0.60 fare.

=== Other Programs and Services ===
- Spirit Express transports Florida State Seminoles football fans from the Tallahassee–Leon County Civic Center to Doak Campbell Stadium and back. Children under 12 ride for free.
- Bike-On-Bus is free bike transportation, allowing up to two people to load their bikes onto the front of the buses on a first come first served basis.
- Next by Text allows riders to learn the arrival time of the next bus at any stop by texting the stop number to 27299.

== Fares ==
The regular, one-trip fare is $1.25 and the reduced one-trip fare is $0.60. The reduced fare is available for seniors, K-12 students, and disabled persons. Kids under 5 years old ride for free with a parent or guardian. K-12 Students can ride fare-free with valid STAR card.

Transfers are FREE with each one-way fare purchase and are valid for 90 minutes from the time of issue. Transfers are not valid for travel in either direction of the route of origin. A transfer ticket may be used for up to two transfers within the allotted 90-minute time and may be used at any location where two or more routes intersect, where two or more routes run parallel or where customers may walk between routes.

StarMetro offers three unlimited ride pass options: a one-day pass (24 hours) for $3, a 7-day pass for $10, and a 31-day pass for $38.

The new farebox accepts multiple forms of payment including paper tickets or smart cards, available at any StarMetro customer service window or at the Ticket Vending Machine at C.K. Steele Plaza, Leon County Schools STAR cards, FSU IDs (student or employee) or FAMU IDs (students only), mobile tickets purchased through Moovit or Token Transit, and cash.

== Facilities and infrastructure ==
=== C.K. Steele Plaza ===
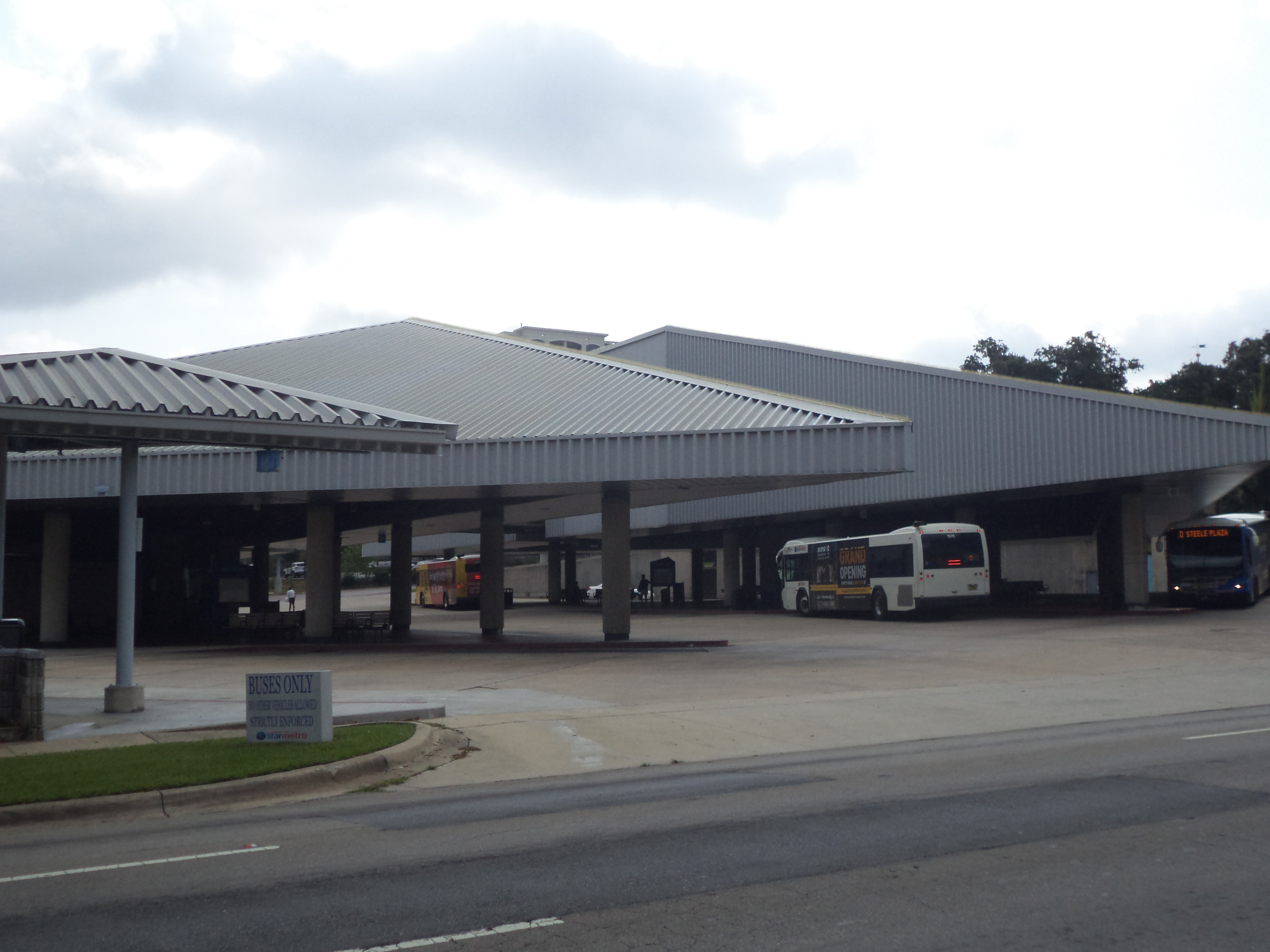
C.K. Steele Bus Plaza

StarMetro's main station is C.K. Steele Plaza ("the plaza"), which was named for the Reverend Charles Kenzie Steele. It is located at 111 West Tennessee Street in downtown Tallahassee on the block bordered by Tennessee Street, Adams Street, Call Street, and Duval Street. The plaza features 24 covered gates for passenger boarding and alighting. Amenities at the plaza include restrooms, covered seating areas, bus driver lounge, and a customer service booth. Fourteen out of the 15 regularly scheduled weekday routes (Azalea, Big Bend, Dogwood, Evergreen, Forest, Gulf, Hartsfield, Killearn, Moss, Park, Red Hills, San Luis, Tall Timbers and Southwood Express) stop at the plaza, in addition to The Heritage Route serving Florida State University Campus, making it the single busiest stop in the system.

=== Big Bend Transit Services ===
In addition to StarMetro buses, C. K. Steele Plaza serves as the eastern terminus of the Gadsden Express route, which connects the residents of Quincy and Midway to Tallahassee. The new Jefferson Express connects the residents of Monticello to Tallahassee. The new Havana Express connects with Big Bend & Forest Routes at Lake Jackson. All these routes receive funding provided by Florida Dept. of Transportation (FDOT).

=== FlixBus/Greyhound ===
FlixBus North America announced on December 11, 2024, that all arrivals & departures will occur at CK Steele Plaza to further streamline operations. Gates 3 & 4 at CK Steele Plaza are dedicated to this service.

C.K. Steele Bus Plaza is slated for upgrades in the near future, including a new announcement system, digital signage, and visual improvements.

=== Administrative Office ===
The StarMetro office is located at 555 Appleyard Drive, at the corner of Appleyard Drive and Jackson Bluff Road. Only two routes stop at this facility during service hours (Forest and Live Oak). Located on this property are administrative offices, a bus maintenance facility, bus parking lot, and customer service window.

=== Bus stops ===
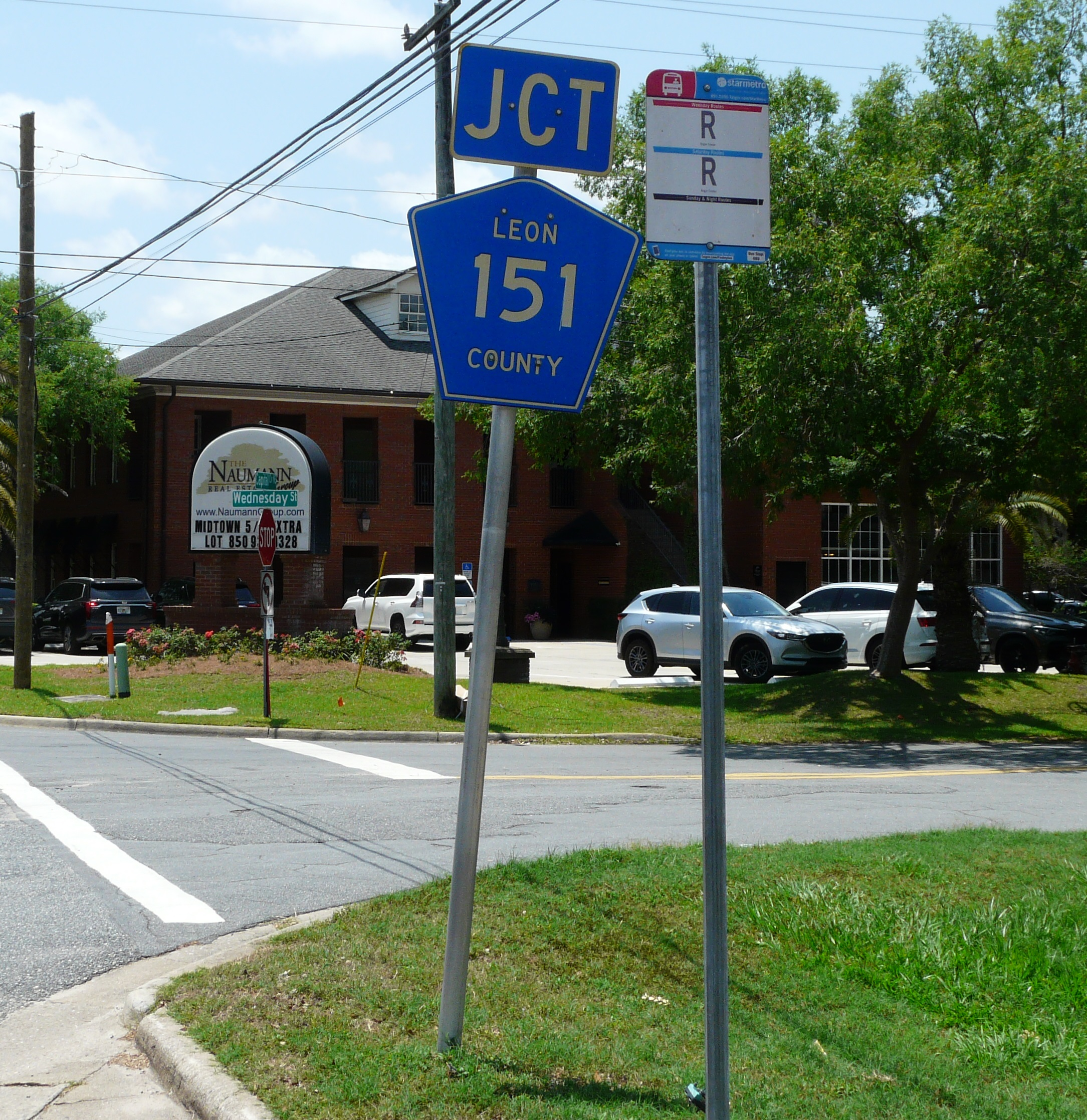
Bus stop on Capital Circle NE

StarMetro bus stops are denoted by a rectangular red, blue and white sign with color-coded letters indicating the routes that serve the stop on specific days of the week, including what the end point or midpoint is for each route. Stops served exclusively by FSU Campus Routes have a different sign with the Seminole Express logo and FSU colors. All stops feature a hexagonal pole and braille to make them more accessible to customers with visual impairments.

While some stops have limited amenities, busier stops and transfer points often have signage, seats, benches, waste containers, and/or covered shelters. Amenities are added to bus stops on an on-going basis and only removed when they have been damaged.

=== Future Facilities ===
A temporary park costing $300,000 was constructed at the future Southside Transit Center (previously slated as a potential "Super-Stop") on the corner of Orange Road and Meridian Road.

== Fleet ==
⟨⟩===Active fixed route fleet=== Currently, StarMetro operates a mix of Gillig and Proterra buses on their fixed routes. Their buses are powered by diesel, CNG, or battery electric. Seats on the newer-model buses are made of padded plastic and are arranged front-facing in rows and sideways against the walls, much like a subway car layout. All models in use except the Dial-A-Ride shuttle vans exceed 4,000 pounds, and therefore are not equipped with seat belts. All buses are equipped with climate-control, interior lighting, and bicycle racks. In March 2020, StarMetro installed barriers to separate drivers from passengers as a response to COVID-19.

| Numbers | Wrap Description | Photo | Year | Manufacturer | Model | Length | Notes |
|---|---|---|---|---|---|---|---|
| 0501-0509 | N/A | | 2005 | Gillig | Low Floor | 35 ft (11 m) | 0502, 0506, & 0509 were retired and sold. 0507 is used as a training bus. Remainder of units in this series are currently being used as contingency spares for FSU campus routes |
| 0703,0704,& 0707-0710 | 0703: Hurricane PREP; 0704/0708: Blue/red, C.K. Steele Plaza; 0707: Multicolored, art & music 0709/0710: Green/yellow, nature park | | 2007 | Gillig | BRT | 40 ft (12 m) | Equipped with wheelchair lifts & bicycle racks. 0703 & 0704 are G29D102N4 models & 0707-0710 are G27D102N4 models. 0702, 0705, & 0706 are retired. |
| 0901-0908 | 0901/0904/0907: Multicolored, art & music 0902: Blue, Future STC; 0903/0905/0906: Purple/Pink, outdoor dining 0908: Orange, canopy | | 2009 | Gillig | BRT | 35 ft (11 m) | Equipped with wheelchair lifts & bicycle racks. 0901-0904 were previously wrapped in FSU livery and used on campus routes. |
| 1001-1002,1004–1012 | 1001/1002/1010-1012 Green, canopy 1004-1009: Blue/yellow, Cascades; 1008: Multicolored, city skyline | | 2010 | Gillig | BRT | 40 ft (12 m) | 1003 Involved in crash on July 20, 2019, damaging front end and has not been returned to service. Equipped with wheelchair lifts & bicycle racks. |
| 1101–1103 | 1101: Multicolored, arts & music 1102: City Bicentennial; 1103: Purple/Pink, outdoor dining | | 2011 | Gillig | BRT | 35 ft (11 m) | Equipped with wheelchair lifts & bicycle racks. Previously wrapped in FSU livery and used on campus routes. |
| 1104–1105 | 1104: (Veterans) Purple Heart; 1105: Blue/red, C.K. Steele Plaza | | 2011 | Gillig | BRT | 40 ft (12 m) | Equipped with wheelchair lifts & bicycle racks. |
| E002–E005 | 2024 FSU Design | | 2012-13 | Proterra | EcoRide BE35 | 35 ft (11 m) | Electric powered. Equipped with wheelchair lifts & bicycle racks. E002 & E003 are 2012 models and E004 & E005 are 2013 models. Originally wrapped in livery that advertised no tailpipe emissions and were used on city-wide routes. Buses were re-wrapped in new FSU livery beginning in Fall 2019 when they began operating on FSU campus routes exclusively. |
| 1201-1202, 1301-1302 | 1201: Blue/Red, C.K. Steele Plaza; 1202, 1301-1302: Teal/Orange, outdoor dining | | 2012-13 | Gillig | BRT | 40 ft (12 m) | Equipped with wheelchair lifts & bicycle racks. |
| 1501–1503 | Orange, canopy | | 2015 | Gillig | Low Floor CNG | 29 ft (8.8 m) | Equipped with wheelchair lifts & bicycle racks. |
| 1701–1706 | 1701-1705: Navy/Orange, local postcard 1706: Orange, canopy | | 2017 | Gillig | | 35 ft (11 m) | Equipped with wheelchair lifts & bicycle racks. |
| 1801–1803 | Multicolored, city skyline | | 2018 | Gillig | | 35 ft (11 m) | Equipped with wheelchair lifts & bicycle racks. |
| 1901-1915 | 2024 FSU Design | | 2019 | Proterra | Catalyst BE35 XR+ | 35 ft (11 m) | Battery-electric powered. Equipped with wheelchair lifts & bicycle racks. Wrapped in new FSU livery. #1910 is wrapped in additional "City of Tallahassee" logos. |
| 2301 | Green sustainability | | 2023 | Proterra | ZX5 BE35 | 35 ft (11m) | Battery-electric powered. Equipped with wheelchair lifts & bicycle racks. |
| 2302, 2303 | Blue zero emission | | 2023 | Proterra | ZX5 BE40 | 40 ft (12m) | Battery-electric powered. Equipped with wheelchair lifts & bicycle racks. |
| 2401 | Blue zero emission | | 2024 | Proterra | ZX5 BE40 | 40 ft (12m) | Battery-electric powered. Equipped with straps for standing room, wheelchair lifts & bicycle racks. |
| 2402 | Green sustainability | | 2024 | Proterra | ZX5 BE35 | 35 ft (11m) | Battery-electric powered. Equipped with straps for standing room, wheelchair lifts & bicycle racks. |
| 2501-2509 | N/A | | 2025 | Unknown | | 40 ft (12m) | Battery-electric powered. Equipped with straps for standing room, wheelchair lifts & bicycle racks. |

=== Dial-A-Ride & FLEX route active fleet ===
StarMetro operates a mixed fleet of vehicles for its FLEX and Dial-A-Ride routes.

| Model Year | Manufacturer/Model | Chassis | Photo | Length | Numbers | Notes |
|---|---|---|---|---|---|---|
| 2012 | Champion Challenger | | | | 2301 | |
| 2014 | Champion Challenger | | | | 1401-1403 | CNG powered |
| 2014 | Mobility Ventures MV-1 | | | 205 in | 2219-2222 | |
| 2015 | Champion Challenger | | | | 1504 | CNG powered |
| 2015 | Dodge Caravan | | | | 1505-1507 | |
| 2016 | Turtletop Odyssey | Ford E450 | | | 1631-1644 | CNG powered |
| 2017 | Champion LF Transport | | | | 1645-1648 | CNG powered, low floor |
| 2019 | Champion Challenger | | | | 1931 | CNG powered, low floor |
| 2019 | Champion | Ford Transit 350 | | | 1932-1934 | |

=== Promotional fleet ===
| Year | Number | About |
|---|---|---|
| Unknown | Unknown | StarMetro's Trolley routes were discontinued during COVID-19 and never reinstated to service. At least one Trolley Bus is still operational and is often decorated and used in promotional events such as the Tallahassee Winter Festival Parade. |
| 2005 | 0507 | Training Bus |

=== Retired fleet ===
| Year | Builder and model name | Length (feet) | Width (inches) | Numbers | Retired | Notes |
|---|---|---|---|---|---|---|
| 1968 | General Motors Corporation; New Look (T6H-4521A) "Fishbowl" | 35 ft (10.67 m) | 96 in (2.44 m) | 6801-6806 | | Acquired when TalTran was formed in 1973. TalTran Logo (Blue & White), Partially Refurbished 1992, ( 6801 & 6802 were not included), (Roll sign was missing on 6802), with separate wheelchair lift access alongside backdoor exit, opening windows, not equipped with power steering, lack of adequate air conditioning, original 1968 interiors preserved. 6805 Dubbed "The Ghostbuster", was in White paint most of the time and decorations were added for Easter, Fourth of July, Halloween, Thanksgiving & Christmas. |
| 1976 | General Motors Corporation; New Look (T6H-4523A) "Fishbowl" | 35 ft (10.67 m) | 96 in (2.44 m) | 7601-7623 | | TalTran Logo, Opening windows, partial interior refurbishing after floor separation. |
| 1982 | Blue Bird; City Bird | 30 ft (9.14 m) | 96 in (2.44 m) | 8201-8210 | | TalTran Logo, Opening windows. |
| 1983 | General Motors Corporation; RTS-04 (T80-604) | 40 ft (12.19 m) | 96 in (2.44 m) | 8401-8404 | | TalTran Logo, First busses purchased with digital signs and locked windows, not wheelchair equipped. |
| 1983 | General Motors Corporation; RTS-04 (T70-604) | 35 ft (10.67 m) | 96 in (2.44 m) | 8405-8411 | | TalTran Logo, Locked windows, not wheelchair equipped. |
| 1992 | Transportation Manufacturing Corporation; RTS-06 (T70-606) | 35 ft (10.67 m) | 96 in (2.44 m) | 9201-9207 | | TalTran Logo, First modern busses equipped with wheelchair lifts and bicycle racks. 9207 After accident, had back digital sign moved slightly towards left but remained on right side, decorated for Easter, Fourth of July, Halloween, Thanksgiving & Christmas. |
| 1993 | Orion Bus Industries; 02.501 | 25.92 ft (7.90 m) | 96 in (2.44 m) | 9301-9305 | | TalTran Logo, Low floor busses, driver seat high off floor, equipped with wheelchair lifts. 9304 & 9305 repainted February 1997 & named C. C. Rider for exclusive use on Capital Circle Office Center Shuttle. |
| 1994 | Transportation Manufacturing Corporation; RTS-06 (T70-606) | 35 ft (10.67 m) | 96 in (2.44 m) | 9401-9425 | | TalTran, then StarMetro Logo. Some buses had interiors partially refurbished after floor separation. Equipped with wheelchair lifts & bicycle racks. 9420 sold to Limo company in Quincy. |
| 1994 | New Flyer Industries; D40LF | 40 ft (12.19 m) | 102 in (2.59 m) | 9426-9432 | | TalTran, then StarMetro Logo (Red, White & Blue). Equipped with wheelchair lifts. These buses were ex-Metropolitan Atlanta Rapid Transit Agency units purchased in 2005. |
| 1996 | NovaBus; RTS-06 (T80-606) | 40 ft (12.19 m) | 96 in (2.44 m) | 9601-9609 | | TalTran, then StarMetro Logo. Equipped with wheelchair lifts & bicycle racks. Sold To Various Limo Company's in Tallahassee. |
| 2000 | Gillig | Trolley Replica | 35 ft (11 m) | 0039-0043 | | Were used for The Midtown College Town & Dinner Route until the routes were discontinued indefinitely due to the COVID-19 pandemic. All units sold to various companies in Tallahassee. |
| 2000–2001 | Advanced Bus Industries; TSV-30 | 30 ft (9.14 m) | 96 in (2.44 m) | 2008, 2011, 2018, 2020 (4 buses) | | StarMetro Logo. Equipped with wheelchair lifts. These buses were ex-Central Ohio Transit Authority units. Used on the 80X Routes until 2007. |
| 2001 | Gillig; Advantage G18B102N4 | 35 ft (10.67 m) | 96 in (2.44 m) | 0101–0109 | | TalTran, then StarMetro Logo. Equipped with wheelchair lifts & bicycle racks. Bus number 0101 was in white paint most of the time & decorated for Easter, Fourth of July, Halloween, Thanksgiving & Christmas. Two buses in this series were repainted for "The Rhythm Route". |
| 2003 | Gillig; Advantage G18B102N4 | 35 ft (10.67 m) | 96 in (2.44 m) | 0301-0302 | | TalTran, then StarMetro Logo. Equipped with wheelchair lifts & bicycle racks. |
| 2005 | Custom | Unknown | Unknown | 0555 | | The "Big Dipper" was a miniature vehicle resembling a bus and was operated by one StarMetro employee. Custom built by the StarMetro maintenance shop from used bus parts, the "Big Dipper" was used in Tallahassee's parades at Winter Festival and Springtime Tallahassee, but is no longer in service. |
| 2006 | Gillig BRT | 29 ft (8.84 m) | 96 in (2.44 m) | 0601 | | Equipped with wheelchair lifts & bicycle racks. Retired in May 2020 when FSU campus routes were replaced by electric busses. |

== Upcoming Improvements ==
In 2023, StarMetro was awarded the Rebuilding American Infrastructure with Sustainability and Equity (RAISE) Grant, the Buses and Bus Facilities / Low or No Emission (Low-No) Grant, and $1 million in legislative appropriation, amounting to an impressive $36 million to put towards the development and construction of the Southside Transit Center, which will be the first new public transit center in Tallahassee since the C.K. Steele Bus Plaza was built in 1986.

StarMetro has explored a variety of possible system improvements. Bus-Rapid Transit was considered for Tennessee Street and Mahan Drive (currently serviced by the Azalea route) and to Woodville and Crawfordville through a joint venture with the Capital Regional Transportation Planning Agency, but requires a Major Investment Study before the project can move forward. As of 2024, inter-county travel is facilitated by express routes operated by Big Bend Transit.
