= King County Metro fleet =

Bus fleet of King County Metro

King County Metro is the local public transit operator in Seattle and King County, Washington, United States. As of 2019, Metro operates the seventh largest fleet of buses in the United States, with a total of 1,583 buses. The agency's buses traveled a total of 53 million miles (85,000,000 km) and transported over 123 million passengers in 2019.

Upon taking over transit operations on January 1, 1973, Metro used buses acquired from predecessor agencies Seattle Transit System and the Metropolitan Transit Corporation, still painted in their original colors. Metro acquired the 91-bus fleet of the Metropolitan Transit Company in December 1972 at a cost of $2.75 million. The first fleet of new 40-foot (12 m) buses ordered by Metro arrived in June 1976, consisting of 145 diesel coaches manufactured by AM General. In 1978, Metro became the first large transit agency in North America to introduce articulated buses to its fleet, which required some bus stops to be rebuilt to accommodate 60-foot (18 m) coaches. The fleet of 151 buses were manufactured by German maker MAN as part of a bulk order with other large U.S. transit agencies.

== Vehicle types ==
In 1978, Metro was the first large transit agency to order high-capacity articulated buses (buses with a rotating joint). Today, King County Metro has one of the largest articulated fleets in North America (second only to MTA New York City Transit) and articulated buses account for about 42% of the agency's fleet.

In 1979, the agency ordered some of the first coaches in the U.S. equipped with wheelchair lifts to provide accessibility for disabled passengers. Early lifts often became stuck and had a very short platform, which was replaced by more reliable models in the 1980s. Metro's entire fleet became wheelchair-accessible in 1999.

Metro was reluctant to adopt low-floor buses, not buying any until 2003; all new fleet additions since then have been low-floor and the last high-floor buses were retired in March 2020.

=== Trolleys ===
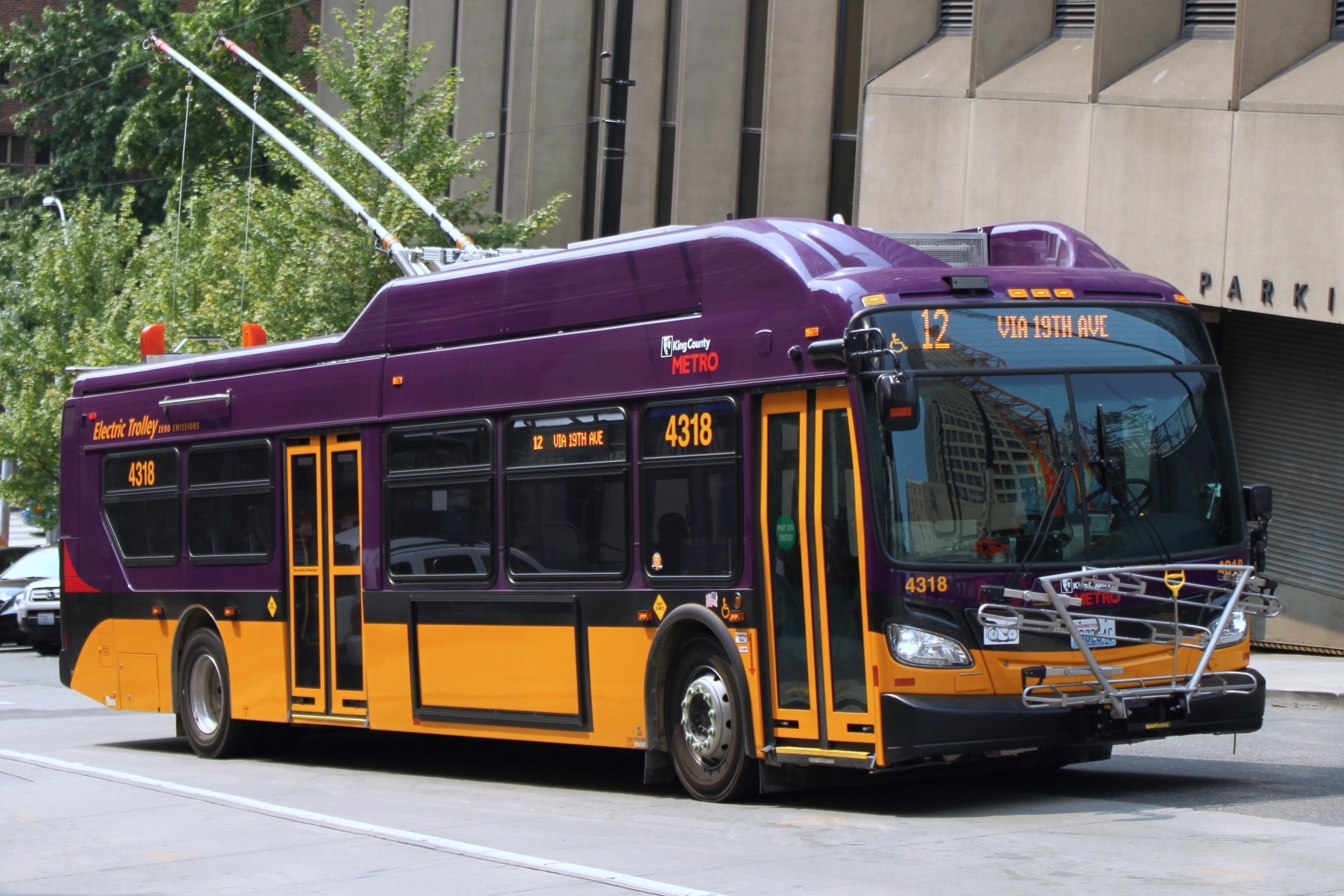
Metro's first low-floor trolleybuses, New Flyer Xcelsior model XT40 vehicles, entered service in 2015.

Metro maintains a fleet of electric trolleybuses that serve 15 routes along almost 70 miles of two-direction overhead wire. This is the second largest trolleybus system in the United States by ridership and fleet size. The trolleybuses are valued by Metro both as zero-emission vehicles, and as vehicles well adapted to Seattle's hilly terrain.

Metro's trolleybus fleet consists of 174 entirely low-floor New Flyer Xcelsior coaches. Of the total, 110 are 40-foot (12 m) vehicles (model XT40) and 64 are 60-foot (18 m), articulated buses (model XT60). The buses include an auxiliary power unit, to allow them to operate off-wire for up to 3 miles (4.8 km).

Occasionally Metro will use diesel or diesel-electric hybrid coaches on trolley routes. Reasons for doing this include construction (weekends only), overhead wire maintenance or events that require coaches to go long distances off-route, "coach changes" (replacing a bus in service that has developed a problem) or to add temporary additional capacity. The latter two cases sometimes lead to diesel buses being used, in order to get the replacement or supplementary vehicle into service as quickly as possible; diesel buses can reach the point of entry into service faster, as they do not need to follow the overhead wires when deadheading.

=== Diesel-electric hybrids ===
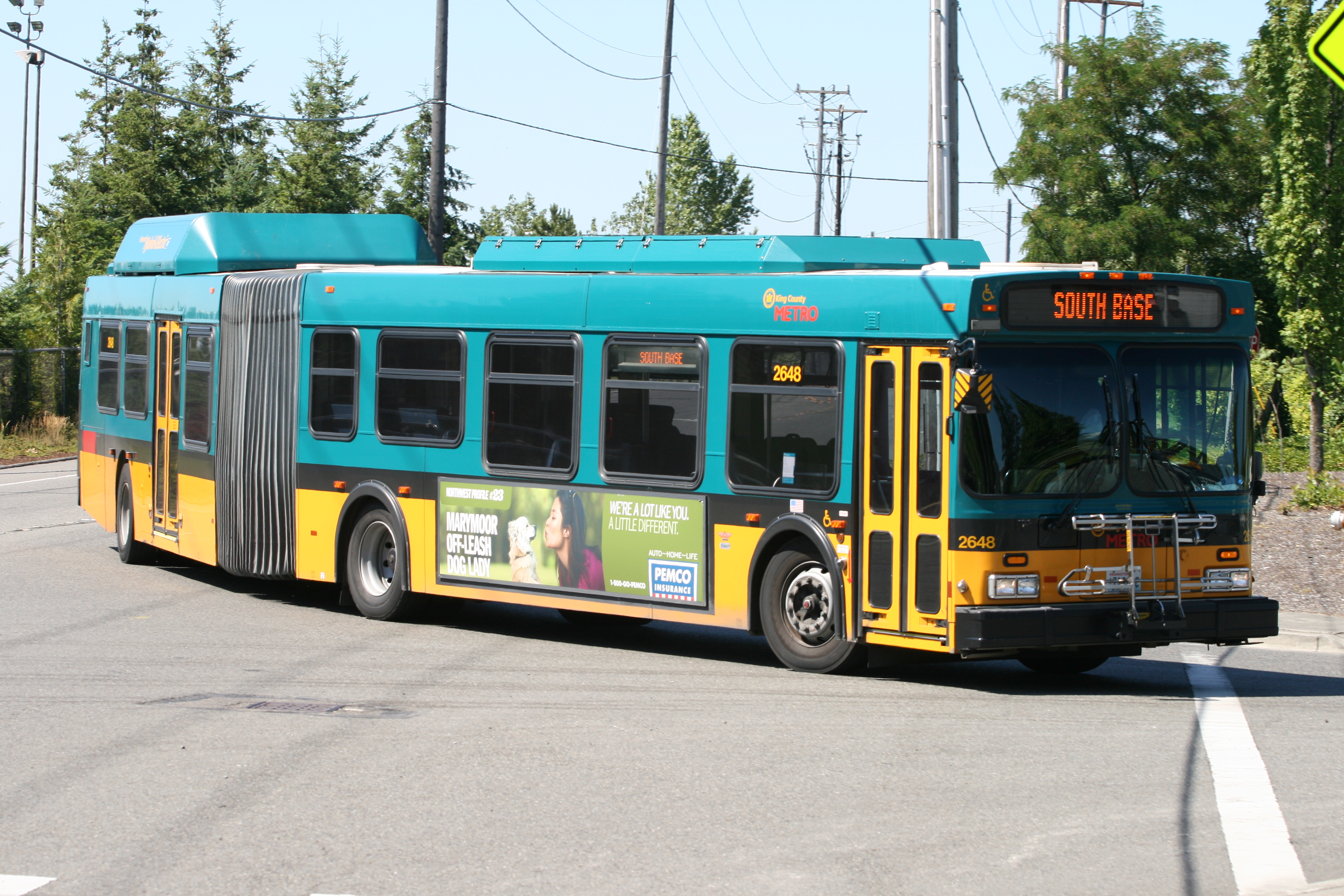
New Flyer DE60LF diesel-electric parallel hybrid bus operated by King County Metro

Metro operates the largest fleet of hybrid buses in the country. The first hybrid buses were purchased in 2004 for use with routes that operated in the Downtown Seattle Transit Tunnel. The National Renewable Energy Laboratory conducted a one-year comparative study between conventional diesel and hybrid-powered buses operating on a typical King County drive cycle. Results showed that the hybrid powered buses lowered fuel consumption by 23%; NOx by 18%; carbon monoxide (CO) by 60%; and total hydrocarbon (THC) by 56% when compared to conventional diesel buses. Those results have led Metro to purchase hybrid buses exclusively since 2005 (with the exception of the all-electric trolley buses). Metro now has over 700 hybrid buses in the fleet, with more on order.

==== Hush mode ====
Buses equipped with the GM-Allison E^{P}50 and the Allison H 50 EP parallel hybrid systems had a special "hush mode" that allowed the buses to operate solely on electric power, reducing tailpipe emissions and noise while operating in the Downtown Seattle Transit Tunnel. Before entering the tunnel, the operator pushed a button that put the coach into hush mode. While buses were inside stations, the coaches operated solely on electric propulsion (although, while the doors are closed, the engine still rotates in order to operate auxiliary loads). In between the tunnel's stations, the buses used electric traction to get to 15 mph (24 km/h), after which a combination of the electric and diesel motors were used. The operation of the diesel engine allowed the batteries to recharge. Hush mode would normally be deactivated by the operator as they exited the tunnel, but the mode will be automatically deactivated after the coach had traveled a certain distance.

Buses have not operated in the tunnel since March 23, 2019.

==== Series hybrids ====
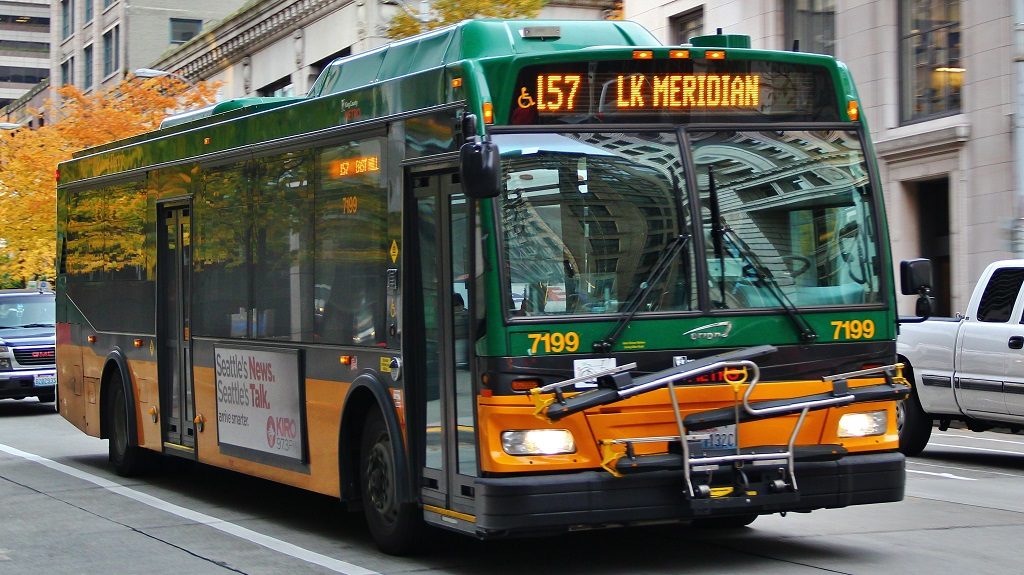
Orion VII diesel-electric series hybrid bus operated by King County Metro

Metro's newer hybrid buses are equipped with the BAE Systems HybriDrive, a series hybrid system. In these buses an electric motor turns the wheels, with power provided by a generator attached to a diesel engine and regenerative braking. Any excess power is stored in batteries on the roof of the bus. Because the diesel engine is not directly propelling the bus, it can operate at a more steady, fuel-efficient speed.

Buses delivered after 2014 are equipped with the upgraded HybriDrive Series-E which uses electrically powered accessory systems (alternator, air conditioning, air compressor, cooling fans and steering pump) to increase fuel efficiency and allow the diesel engine to stop when the bus is stopped and the batteries are sufficiently charged.

=== Battery electric buses ===
Metro began testing three new Proterra Catalyst battery electric buses in 2015. The coaches are capable of traveling over 26 miles before the battery needs to be recharged. A special fast charge station located at the Eastgate Park and Ride allow the bus to be fully recharged in under 10 minutes, during the driver's normally scheduled layover. These new vehicles get the equivalent of 20.8 MPG, which is over 6 times better than the 3.18 MPG seen on Metro's series hybrid electric coaches. The coaches were purchased with support from a $4.7 million Federal Transit Administration grant and entered revenue service on February 17, 2016. They operate on shorter routes (due to their limited range) on the eastside, specifically Routes 226 and 241. Metro has committed to purchasing 120 electric buses with the option to purchase up to 80 additional vehicles by 2020. In 2017 and 2018, Metro tested electric buses with ranges of 140 miles from several manufacturers, and plans to have a zero-emissions bus fleet by 2040.

== Historic preservation ==
Metro has a special fleet of more than a dozen historic motor buses and trolleybuses ranging from ones built in the late 1930s and early 1940s through to ones only recently retired. The coaches are restored, maintained and operated under an agreement with the Metro Employees Historic Vehicle Association (MEHVA), a non-profit organization formed in 1981. A temporary display of four historic Seattle Transit System buses was installed at Occidental Park in Pioneer Square for several days in November 1984 to commemorate the 100th anniversary of the city's streetcar system. Metro maintains ownership of the historic fleet, providing coverage under its fleet self-insurance along with storage, work space and parts on an as available basis.

Money to operate the coaches and purchase parts not in Metro stock is generated by selling tickets to public excursions. The first trips took place in 1984, and nowadays MEHVA typically operates six to eight per year. Each excursion has a different route and a different emphasis.

MEHVA was established in 1981, as Metro prepared to retire trolleybuses that had been operating in Seattle since the 1940s. Since that time, MEHVA acquired other retired transit vehicles which were formerly operated in King County. Often these retired coaches were purchased by private citizens and left on the owner's property for many decades, leaving them in need of restoration. The collection of vehicles has gradually expanded over time, with the addition of newly retired buses when deemed historically notable and not yet represented in the collection.

== Liveries ==
The original Metro livery, named the "Sunrise" and used on all buses, was primarily white with yellow and brown accents; it was chosen in 1973 in a contest after defeating two other options. The initial fleet of buses, retained primarily from the Seattle Transit System and Metropolitan Transit Company, used a total of 15 different color schemes. Since 1996, Metro's buses have been painted in various color schemes that are assigned based on their type. Regular buses generally have their bottom half painted in yellow with a different color on top—either teal, blue, or green. The livery was modified in 2004 and later expanded to add red for RapidRide buses and purple for electric trolleybuses. A new livery, adopted in 2023 for new battery electric buses, is primarily yellow and light blue for conventional coaches and red and purple for RapidRide.

Several buses also have special liveries, including a "Ride with Pride" coach, a Black Lives Matter design by transit operator Robert L. Horton, and a mural for Asian American and Pacific Islander Heritage Month. Buses are also available for advertising wraps that are installed to generate revenue.

== Current fleet roster ==
Make/Model	Length	Thumbnail	Propulsion	Year	Fleet Series (Quantity)	Notes
New Flyer DE60LF	60 feet (18 m)		diesel-electric hybrid	2008–2009	6813–6865 (53)	First articulated buses in fleet with separate air conditioning units for front and rear sections.
New Flyer DE60LFA	60 feet (18 m)		diesel-electric hybrid	2009	6000–6019 (20)	Dedicated to RapidRide routes.; Unit 6000 was built as a prototype and has a rear window, a feature that was eliminated from the production coaches.
OBI Orion VII	40 feet (12 m)		diesel-electric hybrid	2010–2012	7001–7199 (199)	First buses in fleet to be equipped with series diesel-electric hybrid propulsion.
New Flyer DE60LFR	60 feet (18 m)		diesel-electric hybrid	2010–2013	6866–6999, 6800 (135)	
New Flyer DE60LFR	60 feet (18 m)		diesel-electric hybrid	2010–2013	6020–6035, 6040–6073, 6075–6117 (93)	Dedicated to RapidRide routes.
New Flyer Xcelsior XDE35	35 feet (11 m)		diesel-electric hybrid	2013-2014	3700–3759 (60)	First buses in fleet with HybriDrive Series-E system that shuts off diesel engine while stopped to decrease emissions and fuel consumption.; Buses originally ordered from Orion, order transferred to New Flyer after closure of Orion factory.
New Flyer Xcelsior XDE40	40 feet (12 m)		diesel-electric hybrid	2015	7200–7259 (60)	Buses originally ordered from Orion, order transferred to New Flyer after closure of Orion factory.
New Flyer Xcelsior XT40	40 feet (12 m)		electric trolleybus	2014–2015	4300–4409 (110)	First trolleybuses in fleet with low-floor design, air conditioning and a battery power system to allow coaches to operate off-wire for short distances.
New Flyer Xcelsior XT60	60 feet (18 m)		electric trolleybus	2015–2016	4500-4563 (64)	
New Flyer Xcelsior XDE60	60 feet (18 m)		diesel-electric hybrid	2015	6200–6219 (20)	Dedicated to RapidRide routes.
New Flyer Xcelsior XDE60	60 feet (18 m)		diesel-electric hybrid	2018	6220–6241 (22)	Dedicated to RapidRide routes.
New Flyer Xcelsior XDE60	60 feet (18 m)		diesel-electric hybrid	2019	6242-6269 (28)	Ordered for the RapidRide H Line
New Flyer Xcelsior XDE60	60 feet (18 m)		diesel-electric hybrid	2015–2016	8000–8084 (85)	Equipped with three doors for use on urban routes.
New Flyer Xcelsior XDE60	60 feet (18 m)		diesel-electric hybrid	2017–2018	8100–8199 (100)	Equipped with two doors for use on suburban routes.
New Flyer Xcelsior XDE60	60 feet (18 m)		diesel-electric hybrid	2018	8200–8299 (100)	Equipped with three doors for use on urban routes.; Coach 8261 is New Flyer's 10,000th Xcelsior.; Units 8270–8289 renumbered to 6270–6289 and wrapped in the RapidRide livery.
Gillig Low Floor	40 feet (12 m)		diesel-electric hybrid	2017–2019	7300–7494 (195)	
New Flyer Xcelsior XE40	40 feet (12 m)		battery electric	2021	4700-4719 (20)	4700 delivered October 2021 for inspection and testing.; First bus entered service on March 30, 2022.
New Flyer Xcelsior XE60	60 feet (18 m)		battery electric	2021	4800–4819 (20)	140-mile range with a 525 kWh battery.; First bus was delivered in April 2021.; First buses entered service on March 30, 2022.
New Flyer Xcelsior XDE60	60 feet (18 m)		diesel-electric hybrid	2023	6400–6412 (13)	Dedicated to the RapidRide G Line. Has five doors: three on the right and two on the left. Has interior bike racks.; Metro originally planned to order electric trolleybuses, but New Flyer was unable to supply a trolleybus that met all requirements.
Gillig Low Floor EV Plus	40 feet (12 m)		battery electric	2024–2025	1000–1067 (68)	First buses entered service on February 2, 2026.
Gillig Low Floor EV Plus	40 feet (12 m)		battery electric	2025	6500–6521 (22)	Dedicated to RapidRide routes.

== Future fleet ==
Make/Model	Length	Propulsion	Year	Quantity	Notes
Solaris Urbino 12 Electric	40 feet (12 m)	battery electric	2026	TBD (2)	King County Metro is the first in North America to buy from Solaris.; Unconfirmed model designation.
Solaris Urbino 18 Electric	60 feet (18 m)	battery electric	2026	TBD (2)	King County Metro is the first in North America to buy from Solaris.; Unconfirmed model designation.

== Historic fleet ==
These historic buses are owned by King County Metro, but are restored, maintained, and operated by unpaid volunteers who are in the Metro Employee Historic Vehicle Association (MEHVA). The organization was founded in 1981 and operates annual excursion trips with their fleet. Metro preserved its first retired buses that year at the recommendation of Seattle city councilmember George Benson.

Make/Model	Length	Thumbnail	Propulsion	Year	Purchasing Agency	Fleet Number	Notes
Kenworth H-30			Diesel	1938	Seattle Municipal Street Railway	1705	
Twin Coach 30-G			Diesel	1939	Seattle Transit System	231	
Twin Coach GWFT	40 feet		Electric trolleybus	1940	Seattle Transit System	905	Its original number when built was 905. Renumbered 643 in 1963, then 622 in 1965, which number it had when retired from regular service in January 1978. Renumbered back to 643 when cosmetically restored in 1982. Restored to operating condition in 1985–1990. Original fleet number 905 was restored in 2018.
PCF-Brill 40 SMT	40 feet		Electric trolleybus	1940	Seattle Transit System	798	Listed as a Seattle city landmark since 1978
Twin Coach 44 GTT	40 feet		Electric trolleybus	1943	Seattle Transit System	636	
Pullman-Standard 41CA-100-44CX	40 feet		Electric trolleybus	1944	Seattle Transit System	1005	
Kenworth K-10			Diesel	1947	Suburban Transit System	86	
Twin Coach 41-S			Diesel	1948	Seattle Transit System	1705	
General Motors TDH-5105	40 feet		Diesel	1955	Seattle Transit System	263	
General Motors TDH-4512	40 feet		Diesel	1959	Metropolitan Transit Corporation	2962	
Flxible New Look F2D6V-401-1	40 feet		Diesel	1963	Seattle Transit System	598	
General Motors New Look T8H-5305	40 feet		Diesel	1968	Seattle Transit System	724	
AM General Metropolitan 10240B	40 feet		Diesel	1976	Municipality of Metropolitan Seattle	1122	
AM General Metropolitan 10240T	40 feet		Electric trolleybus	1979	Municipality of Metropolitan Seattle	1008	
MAN/AM General SG 220-18-2	60 feet		Diesel	1978	Municipality of Metropolitan Seattle	1455	
Flyer D900 D10240C	40 feet		Diesel	1979	Municipality of Metropolitan Seattle	1657	
MAN Americana SL40102L	40 feet		Diesel	1987	Municipality of Metropolitan Seattle	3152	
Breda DuoBus 350 (ADPB 350)	60 feet		Dual-mode (diesel & electric trolley)	1990	Municipality of Metropolitan Seattle	5034	
Gillig Phantom 40102TBM11	40 feet		Diesel	1997	King County Metro	3374	
Gillig Phantom C28D102N4	40 feet		Electric trolleybus	2002	King County Metro	4195	
New Flyer DE60LF	60 feet		Diesel-Electric Hybrid	2004	King County Metro	2766	

In addition, No. 4020, one of the MAN SG-T 310 articulated trolleybuses, was donated to and preserved at the Illinois Railway Museum (IRM) in 2008 through the efforts of MEHVA. It was part of the first fleet of articulated trolleybuses to operate in America.

== Retired fleet ==
See Trolleybuses in Seattle for a detailed history of Seattle's trolleybus fleet.

Make/Model	Length	Thumbnail	Propulsion	Motor/Powertrain)	Purchased	Retired	Fleet Series (Qty.)	Seated Capacity	Notes
Brill trolley	40'		Electric trolleybus	GE	1940	1963	700–799 (100)	40	
Twin Coach trolley	40'		Electric trolleybus	Westinghouse	1940	1978	800–976 originally 600–659 after 1974 (177)	41	Original series of 800–976 included 24 slightly larger units, built in 1943; remaining coaches renumbered in 1974. No. 905 preserved by Metro (initially preserved as No. 643 from 1982–2018, then reverted to original No. 905).
Pullman-Standard trolley	40'		Electric trolleybus	GE	1944	1978	977–1006 originally 642–655 after 1974 (30)	44	Remaining coaches after some retirements were renumbered in 1974. No. 1005 preserved by Metro.
GMC TDH-5105	40'		Diesel		1955	1982	200–304 (105)	51	No. 263 has been preserved by Metro.
Flxible "New Look"	40'		Diesel	Detroit Diesel 6V71	1963	1986	500-599 (100)	51	No. 598 has been preserved.
GMC "New Look" T8H-5305	40'		Diesel	Detroit Diesel 8V71N / Allison VS2-8	1968	1987	700-769 (70)	48	
AMG "Metropolitan" 10240B8	40'		Diesel	Detroit Diesel 8V71N / Allison V730	1976	1996	1100–1313 (214)	45	No. 1122 has been preserved by Metro.
AMG "Metropolitan" 10240B8	40'		Diesel	Detroit Diesel 8V71T / Allison V730	1976	1996	1340-1349 (10)	45	No. 1122 has been preserved by Metro.
MAN SG-220	60'		Diesel	MAN D2566 MLUM / Renk-Doromat 874B	1978–1979	1999	1400-1550 (151)	72	No. 1455 has been preserved by Metro.
Flyer D900	40'		Diesel	Cummins VTB903/ Allison V730	1979	1997	1600-1823 (224)	47	No. 1657 has been preserved by Metro.
AMG 10240T	40'		Electric trolleybus	GE	1979	2003	900-1009 (109)	45	No. 911 not used.
Flyer D900	35'		Diesel	Cummins VTB903 / Allison V730	1980	1997	1850-1884 (35)	39	
MAN SG-310	60'		Diesel	MAN D2566 MLUM/ Renk-Doromat 874B	1982–1983	2001	2000-2201 (202)	70	
MAN Americana	40'		Diesel	MAN D2566 MLUM/ Renk-Doromat 874B	1986–1987	2004	3000-3146; 3150-3159 (157)	44	No. 3152 has been preserved by Metro.
MAN SG-T 310	60'		Electric trolleybus	Siemens	1987	2007	4000-4045 (46)	64	
Breda DuoBus 350 (ADPB 350)	60'		Dual-mode (diesel & electric trolley)	Diesel: Detroit Diesel 6V92TA / ZF 4HP600; Electric Trolley: AEG / Westinghouse	1988–1991	2005	5000–5235 (236)	63	No. 5034 has been preserved by Metro.
Breda DuoBus 350 (ADPB 350)	60'		Electric trolleybus conversion	AEG/Westinghouse	1988–1991 (converted 2004–2007)	2016	4200–4258 (59)	56	No. 4203 has been preserved by Metro.
Gillig Phantom	35'		Diesel	Cummins M11 / Allison B400R Gen III	1997	2015	3185-3199 (13)	34	
New Flyer D60HF	60'		Diesel	Cummins M11 / Allison B400R Gen III	1998–1999	2018	2300–2573 (274)	64	
Gillig Phantom	40'		Electric trolleybus	GE (refurbished by Alstom)	2002	2016	4100–4199 (100)	42	
New Flyer D60LF	60'		Diesel	Caterpillar C9 / Allison B500R Gen IV	2004	2018	2870–2899 (30)	56	
StarTrans President LF	28'		Diesel	GMC/Duramax Allison 1000 series	2009	2013	1900-1934 (35)	19	Retired due to design flaws
Gillig Phantom	40'		Diesel	Cummins M11/Allison WB-400R	1996–1999	2019	3200-3594 (395)	42	3341, 3361, & 3416 sold to Pullman Transit in 2014.; No. 3374 has been preserved by Metro.
Gillig Phantom	30'		Diesel	Cummins ISC/Allison WB-400R	1999-2000	2020	1100–1194 (95)	30	
New Flyer D40LF	40'		Diesel	Cummins ISL/Voith 864.3	2003	2020	3600-3699 (100)	35	
Proterra Catalyst BE40	40'		Battery Electric	UQM HD220 / Eaton EEV-7202	2019	2020	1750-1751 (2)	38	Test buses; Original T461-T462 renumbered to 1750-1751.
XE40 Xcelsior CHARGE	40'		Battery Electric	Siemens ELFA2	2018	2020	1752-1753 (2)	38	Test buses; Original 1252-1253 renumbered to 1752-1753.
XE60 Xcelsior CHARGE	60'		Battery Electric	Siemens ELFA2	2018	2020	1754-1755 (2)	49	Test buses; Original 1250-1251 renumbered to 1754-1755.
BYD K9	40'		Battery Electric	BYD TYC90A	2018	2020	1756-1757 (2)	38	Test buses
BYD K11M	60'		Battery Electric		2018	2020	1758-1759 (2)		Test buses
New Flyer DE60LF	60'		Diesel-Electric Hybrid	Caterpillar C9 / Allison EP50	2004	2021	2600-2812 (213)	56	No. 2766 has been preserved by Metro.
Proterra Catalyst	40 feet (12 m)		battery electric	UQM HD220 / Eaton EEV-7202	2015	2024	4601–4603 (3)	37	
Proterra Catalyst	40 feet (12 m)		battery electric	UQM HD220 / Eaton EEV-7202	2018	2024	4604–4611 (8)	37	

== See also ==
- Sound Transit
- Trolleybuses in Seattle
