= StarMetro =

StarMetro or Star Metro may refer to:

- StarMetro (newspaper), a defunct chain of daily free commuter newspapers in Canada
- StarMetro (bus service), a public bus system in Tallahassee, Florida
