= Proterra EcoRide =

American battery electric transit bus

Proterra EcoRide BE35
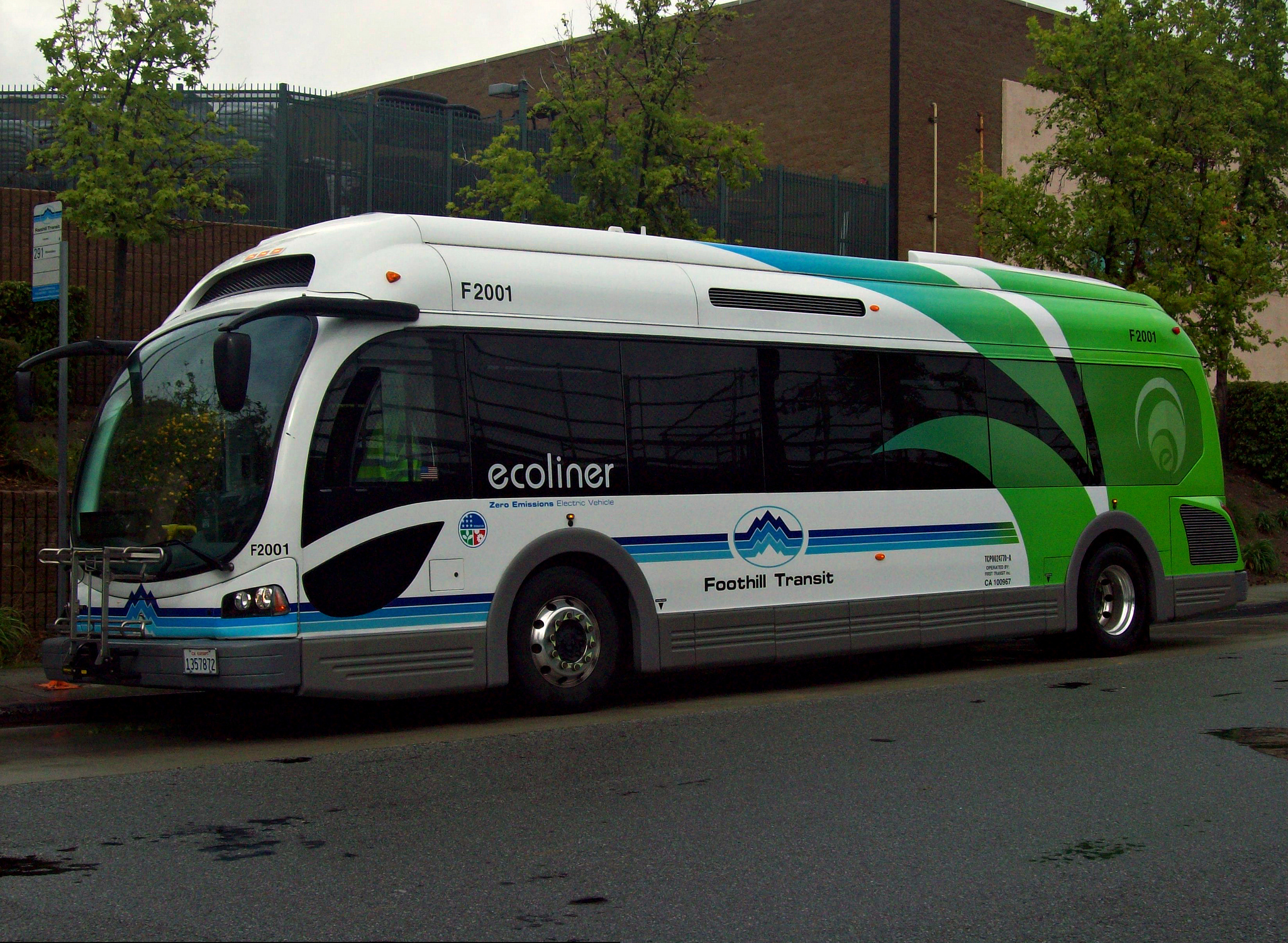
- EcoRide BE35 in service with Foothill Transit

Overview
- Manufacturer: Proterra
- Production: 2010–2014

Body and chassis
- Class: Transit bus
- Body style: Monocoque stressed skin
- Layout: Rear-engine, rear-wheel-drive

Powertrain
- Electric motor: UQM Technologies PP220
- Transmission: BorgWarner; Eaton ES-11209

Dimensions
- Wheelbase: 236 to 237 in (5.99 to 6.02 m)
- Length: 35 ft 8 1/2 in (10.9 m)
- Width: 101.4 to 103 in (2.58 to 2.62 m)
- Height: 132 to 134 in (3.35 to 3.40 m)
- Curb weight: 27,680 to 28,180 lb (12,600 to 12,800 kg)

Chronology
- Successor: Proterra Catalyst

The Proterra EcoRide BE35 is a 35 foot (11 m) fast-charge battery electric low-floor transit bus manufactured by Proterra from 2010 to 2014. The EcoRide seats 38 (including the driver) with a total passenger capacity of 60 in its composite body. Foothill Transit was the first transit agency to operate the buses in revenue service, starting in September 2010.

The BE35's electric traction motor draws from lithium-titanate batteries supplied by Altairnano that can be recharged in 5–10 minutes while stopped at a bus stop via overhead terminals connected to a charging station, without driver involvement. The quick charging during a brief layover typically enables a further 26 miles (42 km) of operation.

== History ==
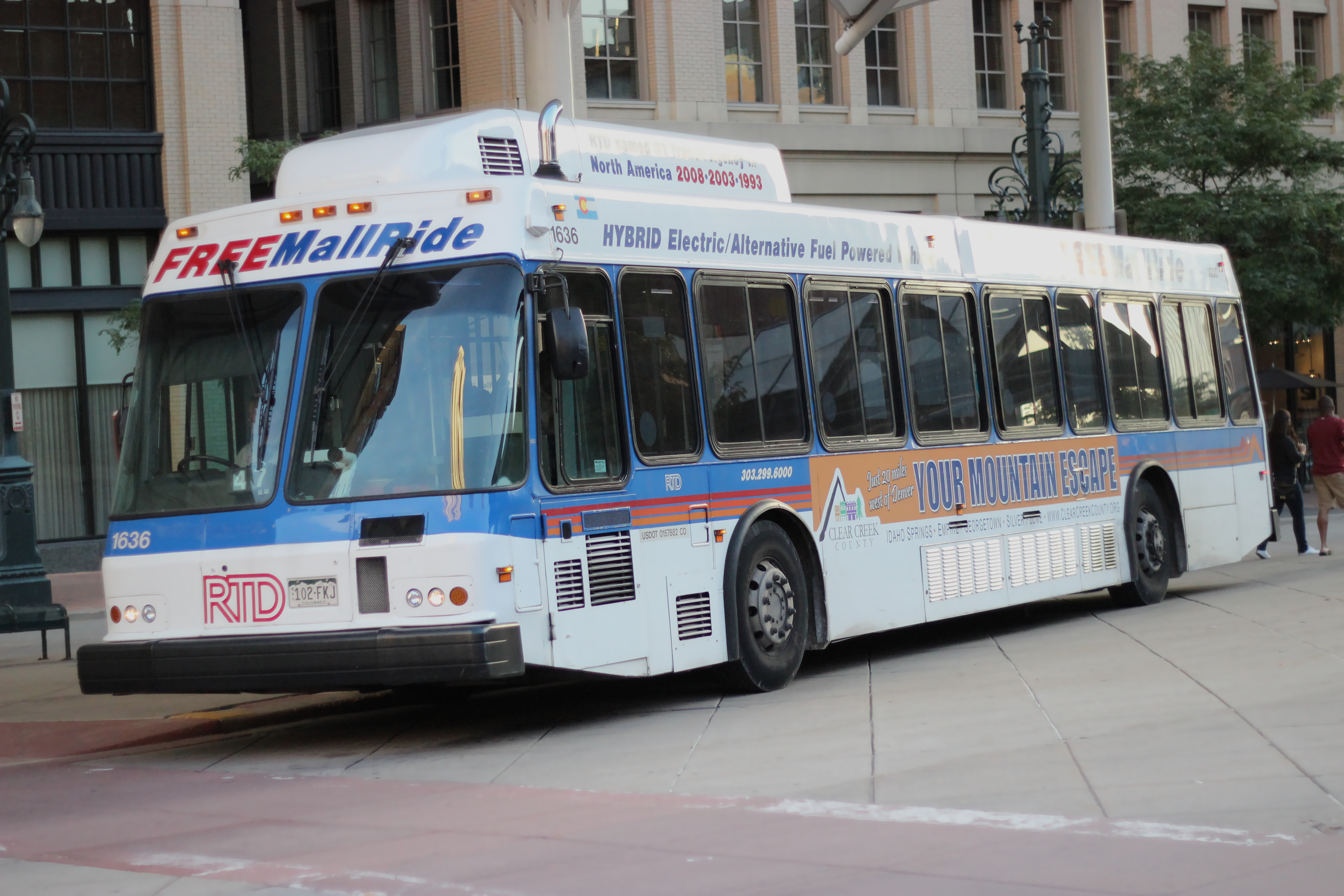
TransTeq EcoMark I for 16th Street Mall service

CEO Dale Hill and VP Phil Sweesy of Mobile Energy Solutions, LLC (MES) in Golden, Colorado had previously designed, engineered, and manufactured the 36 CNG-fueled TransTeq EcoMark I hybrid buses for the 16th Street Mall in Denver, Colorado. In 2006, MES announced it was designing a battery-electric bus codenamed "Origin One", recharged by onboard hydrogen fuel cells; the company announced it had already won a contract for two buses from the Greater New Haven Transit District, the transit agency serving New Haven, Connecticut. This was followed by a 2007 contract for two more fuel cell buses for Burbank, California; by this time the key characteristics were announced: a 35-foot (11 m) composite body provided by Martin Marietta, lithium-titanate batteries, and plug-in charging in addition to onboard charging through the use of a range-extending auxiliary power unit (APU) consisting of two 16 kW fuel cells from Hydrogenics.

Developmental funding was provided by the Federal Transit Administration (FTA), who had awarded a grant under the National Fuel Cell Bus Program to a team led by the Center for Transportation and the Environment (CTE); CTE had selected MES to develop the prototype bus. MES was also a partner in the FTA's Electric Drive Strategic Plan program. MES acquired an old school bus to serve as a mobile development laboratory (MDL) for drivetrain development, including the battery, traction motor, and control system. The MDL was damaged after one battery cell leaked electrolyte, short-circuited, and caught on fire, leading MES to redesign its battery management system and add a protective enclosure for the battery modules in the finished prototype.

MES changed its name to Proterra in June 2008 and exhibited a prototype of the HFC35 transit bus that October at the American Public Transit Association Expo in San Diego. As shown with the fuel cell APU, Proterra claimed the HFC35 had a range of 250 miles (400 km) before needing to be refueled or recharged. Alternatively, the HFC35 could be optioned with diesel, gasoline, or natural gas APUs.

In 2009, Proterra demonstrated a variant of the HFC35 that omitted the APU altogether, which Proterra named the EcoRide BE35. The BE35 stopped in four California cities during its weeklong tour: San Jose, Los Angeles, Sacramento, and San Francisco.

=== Deployment ===
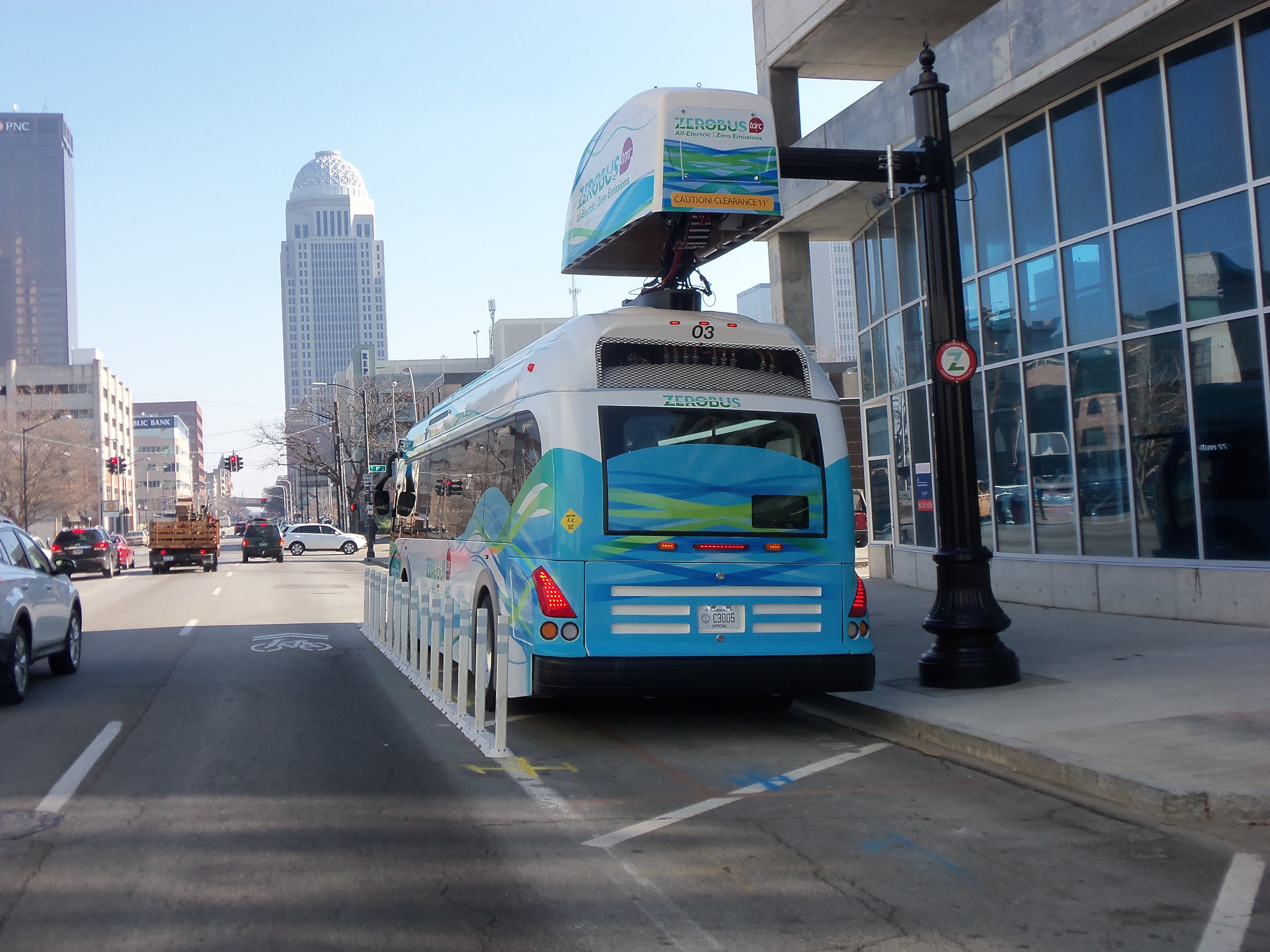
TARC EcoRide BE35, docked in overhead charger (2015)

The HFC35 prototype exhibited at APTA '08 in San Diego was later demonstrated in Washington, D.C. (Nov 2008) and a nationwide tour in regular service was scheduled for 2009, starting in Columbia, South Carolina as a football stadium shuttle for the University of South Carolina (with maintenance, refueling, and charging at Central Midlands Regional Transit Authority), with Capital Metro in Austin, Texas, and at the 2010 Olympic and Paralympic Winter Games in Vancouver, British Columbia. A second HFC35 was ordered by the City of Burbank, and a third was ordered by the United States Department of Defense (DoD) for use in Washington state. Burbank's HFC35 entered service in May 2010. The DoD HFC35 was delivered to Joint Base Lewis–McChord in Tacoma, Washington, where it was powered by hydrogen reformed from mewthane produced during wastewater treatment.

The first production BE35 was delivered to Foothill Transit in September 2010, operating as the "EcoLiner" on line 291 between Pomona and La Verne. Other agencies that purchased BE35 buses and charging equipment included the Nashville Metropolitan Transit Authority, Worcester Regional Transit Authority, San Joaquin Regional Transit District (Stockton), VIA Metropolitan Transit (San Antonio), StarMetro (Tallahassee), Regional Transportation Commission of Washoe County (Reno), and Clemson Area Transit (Seneca, South Carolina); most purchases were funded by more than $25 million in grants from the FTA's Transit Investments for Greenhouse Gas and Energy Reduction (TIGGER) program.

Proterra introduced the 40-foot (12 m) Catalyst in 2014, featuring a longer range and new fast-charging system.

== Design ==
Proterra drew inspiration from existing and prototype composite buses: the Neoplan USA Metroliner in Carbon, Advanced Technology Transit Bus (ATTB), and NABI CompoBus, concluding that a composite bus body was best suited to reduce weight and accommodate an equivalent number of seats (37) as a conventional 40-foot (12 m) low-floor transit bus. The composite body forms were finished by Pearson Composites in Warren, Rhode Island, and the shells were assembled by C&C Fiberglass Components using vacuum-assisted resin transfer molding. Some of the people who helped develop ATTB would go on to work for MES.

Although the batteries can be recharged quickly, the overall capacity is low. The BE35 and HFC35 shared the same electric powertrain and battery design; while the HFC35 had a range-extending APU, no additional battery storage capacity was added to the BE35. The battery pack has a total storage capacity of 54 to 72 kW-hr, composed of three or four 18 kW-hr battery strings. Each string weighs 550 pounds (250 kg). A single string is built from sixteen modules wired in series, each rated at 50 A-hr and 23 volts; the total string is 368 volts and 18.4 kW-hr, and three or four strings are used in parallel for the overall capacity of 54 or 72 kW-hr. However, using on-route fast charging, an EcoRide BE35 set a record in April 2014 by driving more than 700 miles (1,100 km) in 24 hours. In June 2016, Proterra announced it would grant royalty-free access to the patents covering their FastFill overhead charging system.

Proterra uses the TerraVolt branding for the battery system and ProDrive for the drivetrain module, which includes the traction motor and optional range-extending APU. The traction motor announced with the HFC35 and the first versions of the EcoRide BE35 was supplied by UQM Technologies and branded PowerPhase 150, offering a peak and continuous power output of 150 and 100 kW (200 and 130 hp), and peak and continuous torque of 650 and 400 N⋅m (480 and 300 ft⋅lb), respectively. The traction motor was upgraded to the UQM PowerPhase HD220 in 2013, which increases peak power and torque to 220 kW (300 hp) and 700 N⋅m (520 ft⋅lb), respectively.

=== Testing ===
The first HFC35 prototype was not available for service for approximately two months to address a failure in a DC-DC converter, which provided the interface between the fuel cell APU and the traction battery.

Results from the BE35 STURAA test at the Bus Research and Testing Center in Altoona, Pennsylvania showed an average, combined fuel economy of 1.81 kWh/mi (1.12 kW⋅h/km) or 20.84 miles per US gallon (11.29 L/100 km) diesel equivalent. Compared to the buses it replaces—conventional diesel buses average 3.86 miles per US gallon (60.9 L/100 km); CNG buses return 3.27 miles per US gallon (72 L/100 km) diesel equivalent; and diesel-hybrid buses average about 4.6 miles per US gallon (51 L/100 km)—the results are up to 600% better. During 15,000 miles (24,000 km) of testing at Altoona for the first BE35, unscheduled maintenance included the replacement of the transmission (twice) and the traction motor (once).

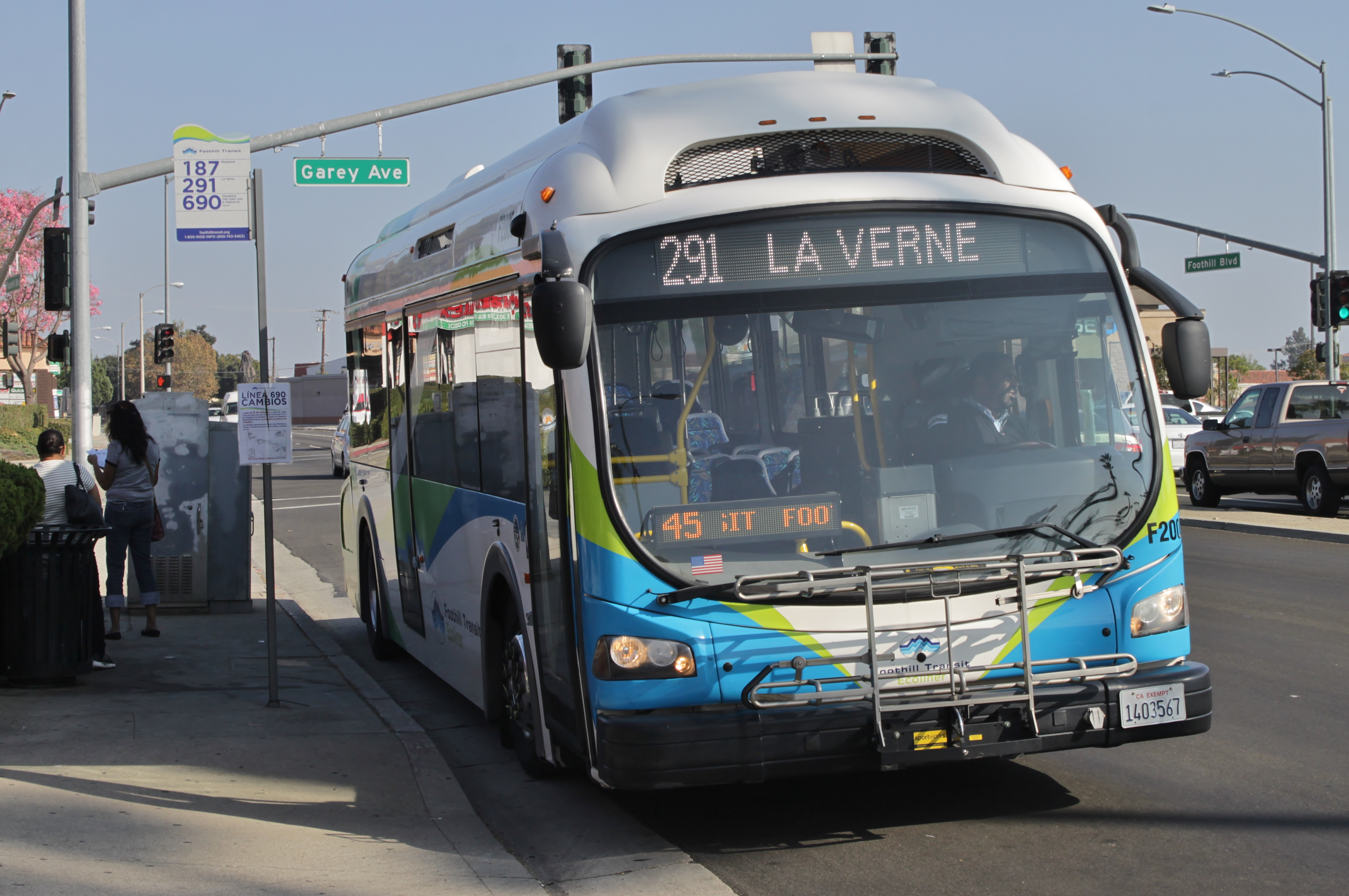
Foothill Transit EcoRide BE35, line 291 (2016)

Foothill Transit has been working with the California Air Resources Board and the United States Department of Energy National Renewable Energy Laboratory (NREL) to study the real-world performance of its Proterra buses. Observed economy for twelve BE35 buses in the Foothill Transit fleet was 17.24 miles per US gallon (13.64 L/100 km) diesel equivalent, compared to an observed 4.15 miles per US gallon (56.7 L/100 km) diesel equivalent for a fleet of eight NABI 42-BRT CNG-fueled buses. However, the BE35 fleet operates on circulator routes at slower speeds compared to the NABI CNG fleet, which were dispatched as needed to any Foothill Transit route. The BE35 fleet achieved an availability of 80.6%, less than the desired 85% availability due to constraints on parts availability and low-voltage battery (i.e., not the propulsion batteries) reliability; the NABI CNG fleet achieved an availability of 96.8%. Total maintenance costs for the BE35 fleet ($0.41/mi) is also higher than the maintenance cost for the NABI CNG fleet ($0.27/mi).
