= Proterra Catalyst =

American battery electric transit bus

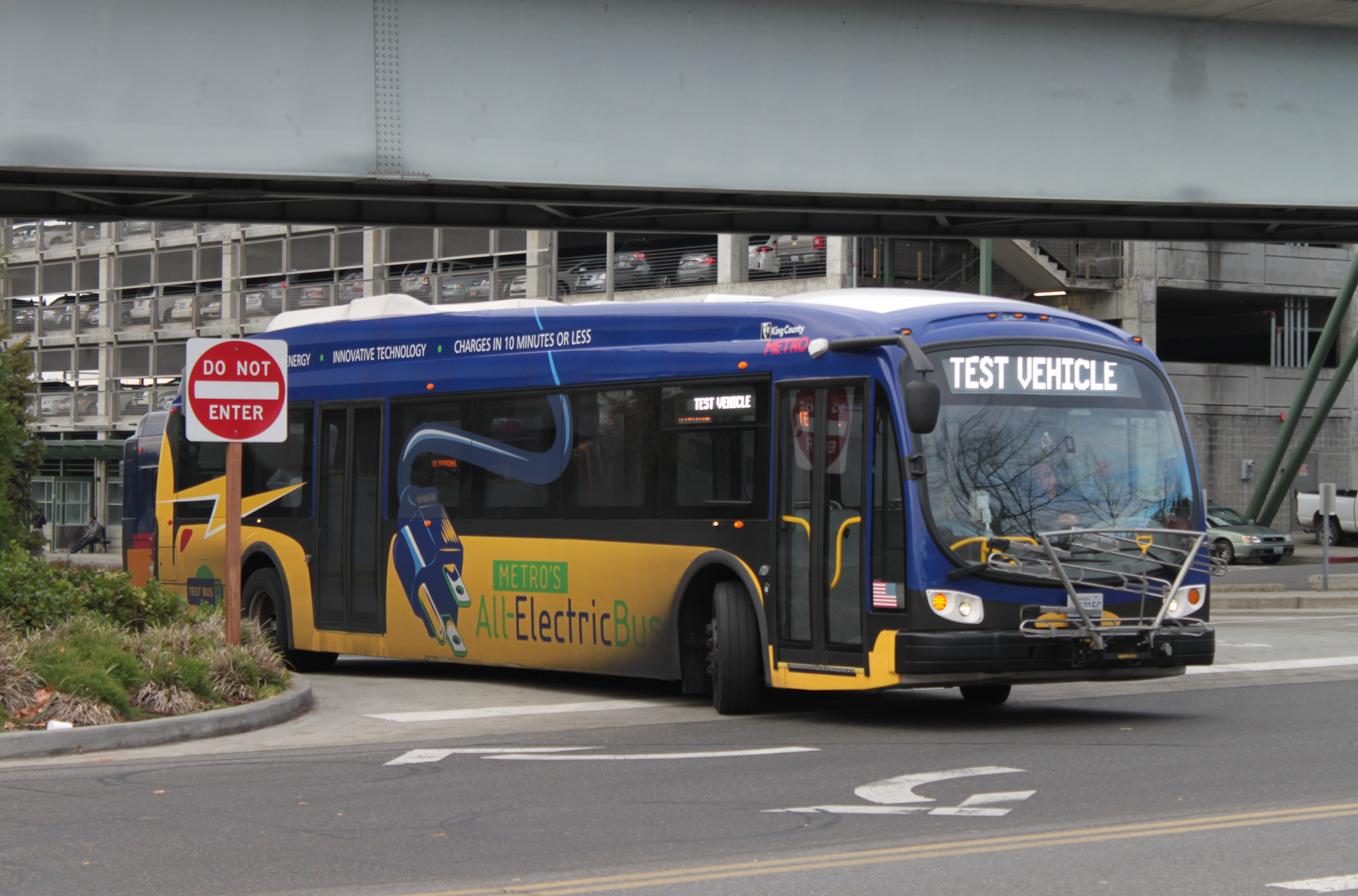
- Catalyst BE40 operated by King County Metro

Overview
- Manufacturer: Proterra
- Production: 2014–2020

Body and chassis
- Class: Transit bus
- Body style: Monocoque stressed skin
- Layout: Rear-engine, rear-wheel-drive

Powertrain
- Electric motor: UQM Technologies PP220 (original); UQM Technologies SPM250-130-2 (ProDrive); 2×Parker Hannifin GVM310-125 (DuoPower)
- Transmission: Eaton EEV-7202

Dimensions
- Wheelbase: BE40: 296.5 in (7.53 m); BE35: 243 in (6.17 m)
- Length: BE40: 42 ft 7 1/2 in (12.99 m); BE35: 36 ft 11 1/2 in (11.3 m)
- Width: 102 in (2.59 m)
- Height: 134 in (3.40 m)
- Curb weight: BE40: 27,370 lb (12,400 kg); BE35: 29,910 lb (13,600 kg)

Chronology
- Predecessor: Proterra EcoRide
- Successor: Proterra ZX5

The Proterra Catalyst is a battery-electric low-floor transit bus that was built by Proterra from 2014 to 2020. The second generation of Proterra's battery-electric buses, it succeeded the earlier EcoRide as the company's flagship product.

== History ==
In 2014 Proterra introduced the Catalyst, a fast-charge 100% electric bus to replace the EcoRide BE35. The bus was built on the EcoRide's design and engineering and delivered a longer, lighter and more fuel-efficient bus. The second-generation bus measures either 42 ft (12.8 m) or 36 ft (11.0 m) and weighs approximately 27,000 lb (12,000 kg). The bus is built from lightweight, durable carbon composite. The overall lower weight helps reduce wear and tear on streets. It has no tailpipe and runs virtually silent.

== Specifications ==
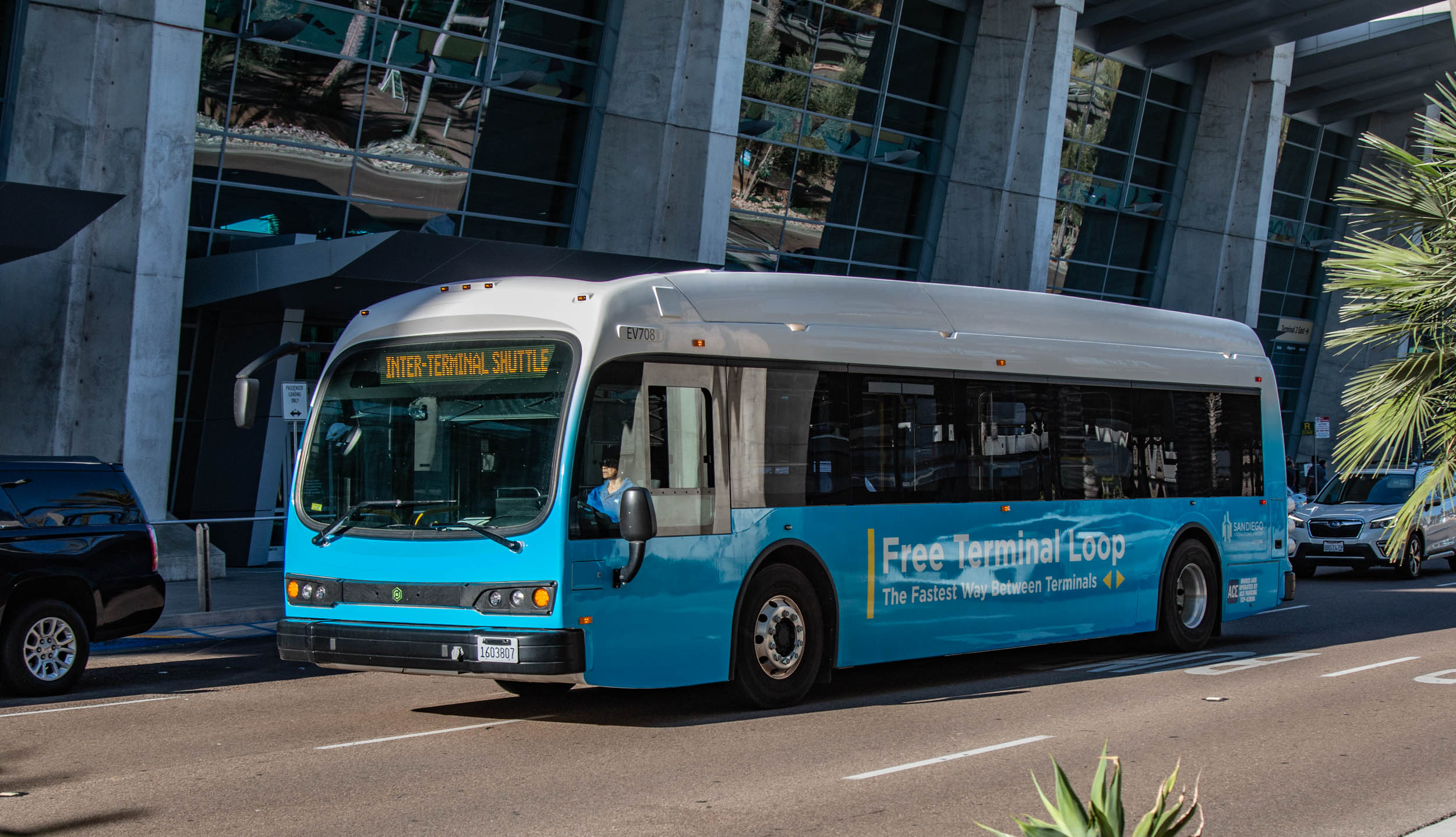
Catalyst BE35 operated by San Diego International Airport

With the on-route fast charging system, the Catalyst can be operated continuously, 24/7, without the need to head to the depot for lengthy charge times. Catalyst buses equipped with the Fast Charge (FC) battery pack can charge at a rate of up to 500 kW. The company added a 35 ft (10.7 m) model of the Catalyst to its product line in October 2015.

Catalyst is a modular system, offered with two different lengths, two different drivetrains, and seven different batteries, depending on the required passenger capacity, speed (hill performance), and range, respectively.

=== Drivetrains ===
At introduction, the Catalyst was equipped with a single electric traction motor, the UQM Technologies HD220. The HD220 was rated at 220 kW (300 hp) peak power (120 kW (160 hp) continuous) and 700 N⋅m (520 ft⋅lb) peak torque (350 N⋅m (260 ft⋅lb) continuous); a later revision, designated HD220+, increased continuous power and torque ratings to 150 kW (200 hp) and 440 N⋅m (320 ft⋅lb), respectively.

The DuoPower drivetrain was introduced in October 2017; it uses two electric traction motors and has a claimed 20% increase in efficiency compared to the original single-motor drivetrain, which was redesignated ProDrive. As ProDrive, the Catalyst was equipped with an upgraded UQM HD250 motor, which offered increased ratings of 250 kW (340 hp) peak power (150 kW (200 hp) continuous) and 900 N⋅m (660 ft⋅lb) peak torque (360 N⋅m (270 ft⋅lb) continuous). The DuoPower traction motors are permanent magnet alternating current motors manufactured by Parker Hannifin as part of their Global Vehicle Motor (GVM) series.

=== Batteries ===
Buses equipped with the FC (Fast Charge) family of batteries are intended for circulator routes; XR (eXtended Range) battery buses are intended for intermediate-mileage routes; and E2 (Efficient Energy) battery buses are intended for high-mileage routes. The buses were initially offered with lithium-titanate battery chemistry, which Proterra redesignated the TerraVolt FC. FC batteries can be fully recharged in less than ten minutes.

The TerraVolt XR lithium nickel manganese cobalt oxide batteries were introduced in 2015 with improved range but slower charging, approximately one hour to full charge.

TerraVolt E2 batteries were introduced in 2016 with the longest range and slowest charging. The E2 battery range features a 3–5 hour charge time. E2 batteries have an energy density of 160 W-hr/kg and 260 W-hr/L, and use cells from LG Chem.

Batteries are carried under the Catalyst chassis, and use an interchangeable mounting system, so each Catalyst can hold between four and ten battery packs. The batteries can be swapped out, upgraded, or reconfigured as needs change.

=== Charging ===
Charging infrastructure alternatives

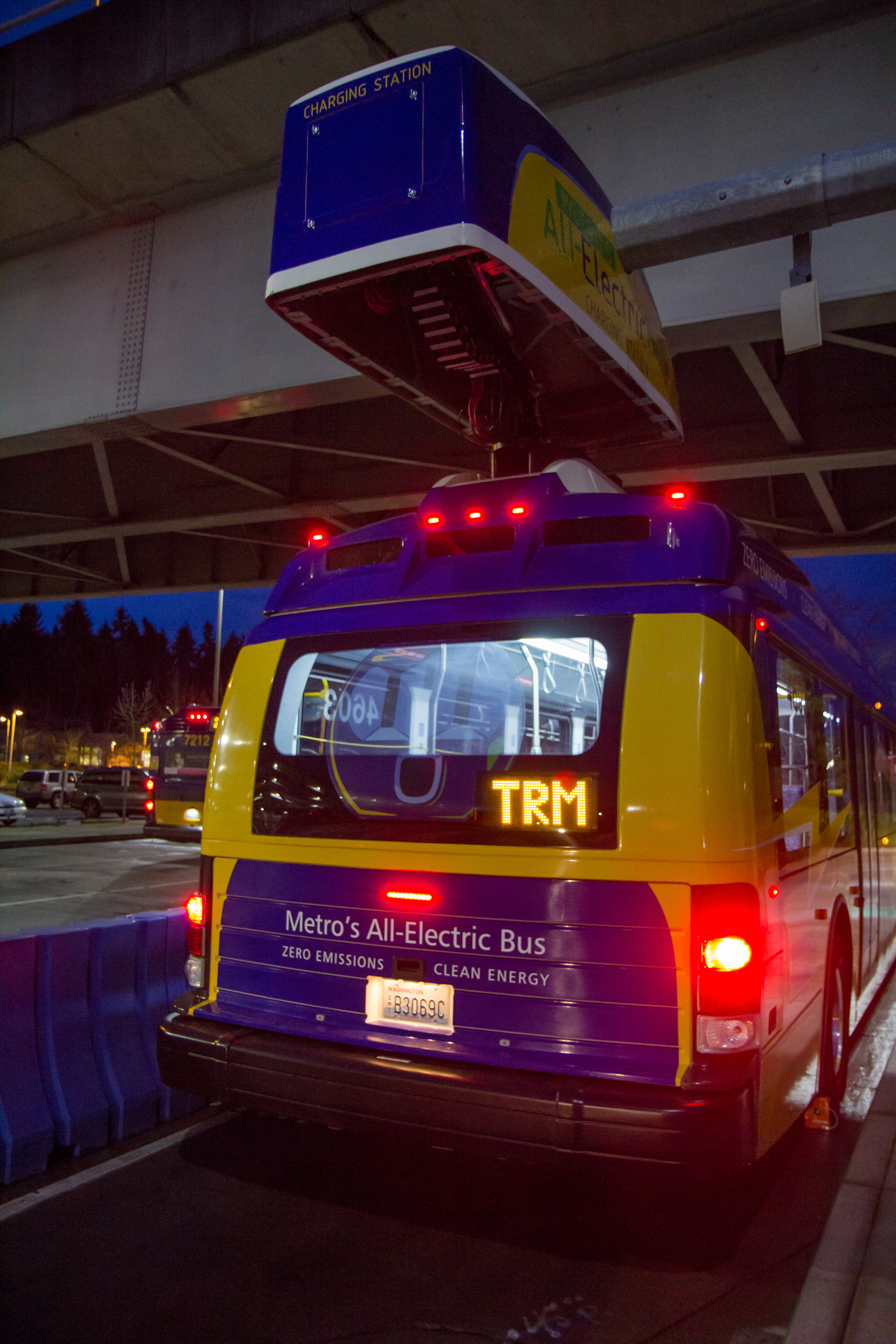
Overhead / en-route (Feb 2016)

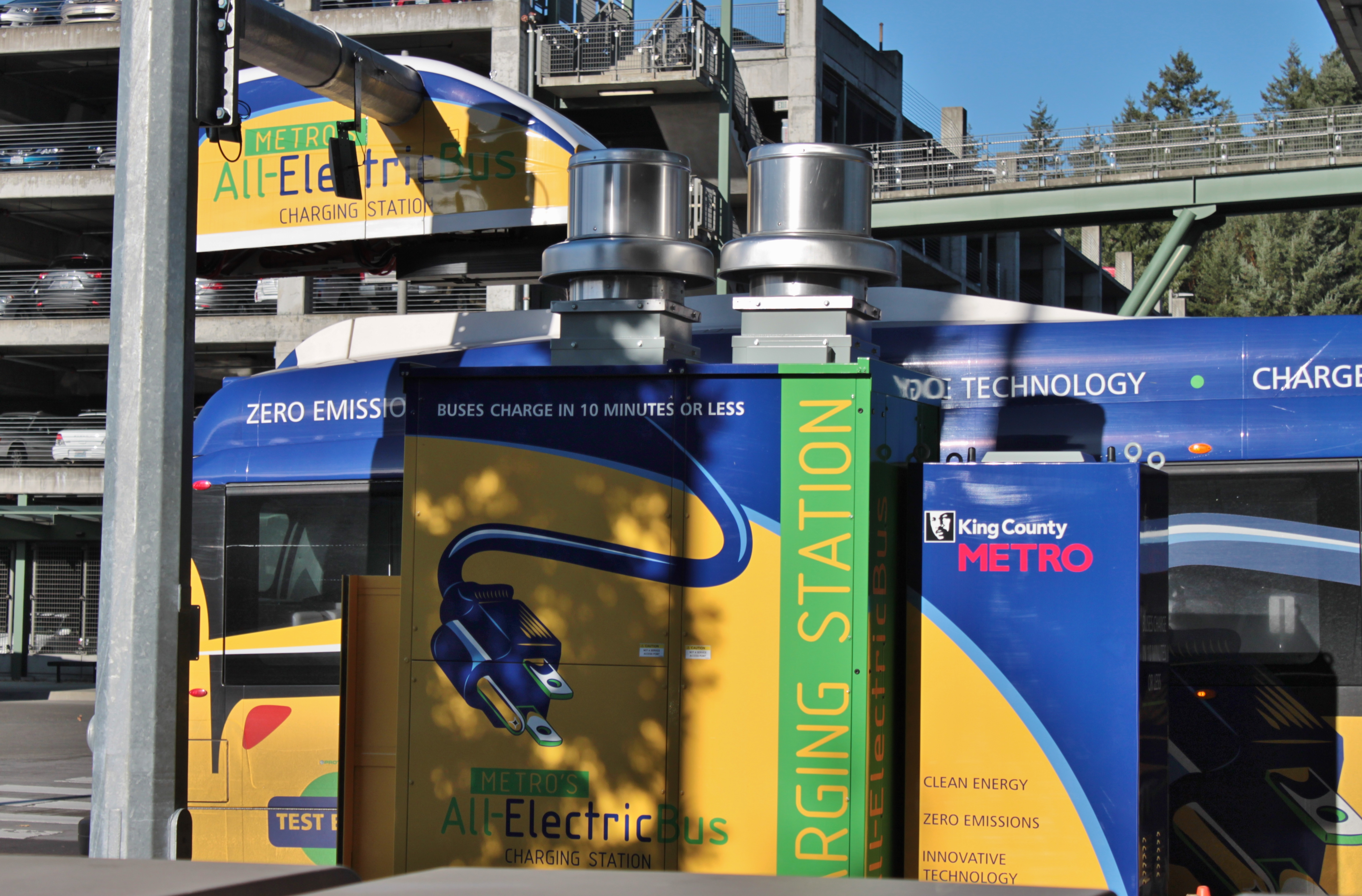
Curbside (Nov 2015)

Under evaluation with King County Metro Transit at Eastgate Park & Ride

Buses can charge en route, allowing more trips and higher productivity for circulator or loop routes. One common example is to have charging stations at major transit centers. Two examples of this are the Washington Plaza Bus Terminal in New York and the Mill Woods Transit Center in Edmonton.

Charging rates range from 60 to 120 kW (using the SAE J1772 CCS ports) and from 166 to 350 kW (using a J3105 overhead fast-charger). In 2018, Proterra began offering the OppCharge (SAE J3105-1) overhead charger instead of its proprietary "blade" overhead charger.

== Replacement ==
On September 15, 2020, Proterra announced the replacement to the Catalyst, the ZX5. The ZX5 40' replaced the BE40 and the ZX5 35' replaced the BE35. Edmonton Transit Service was the launch customer, ordering 40 ZX5 40' buses.

== Notable operators ==
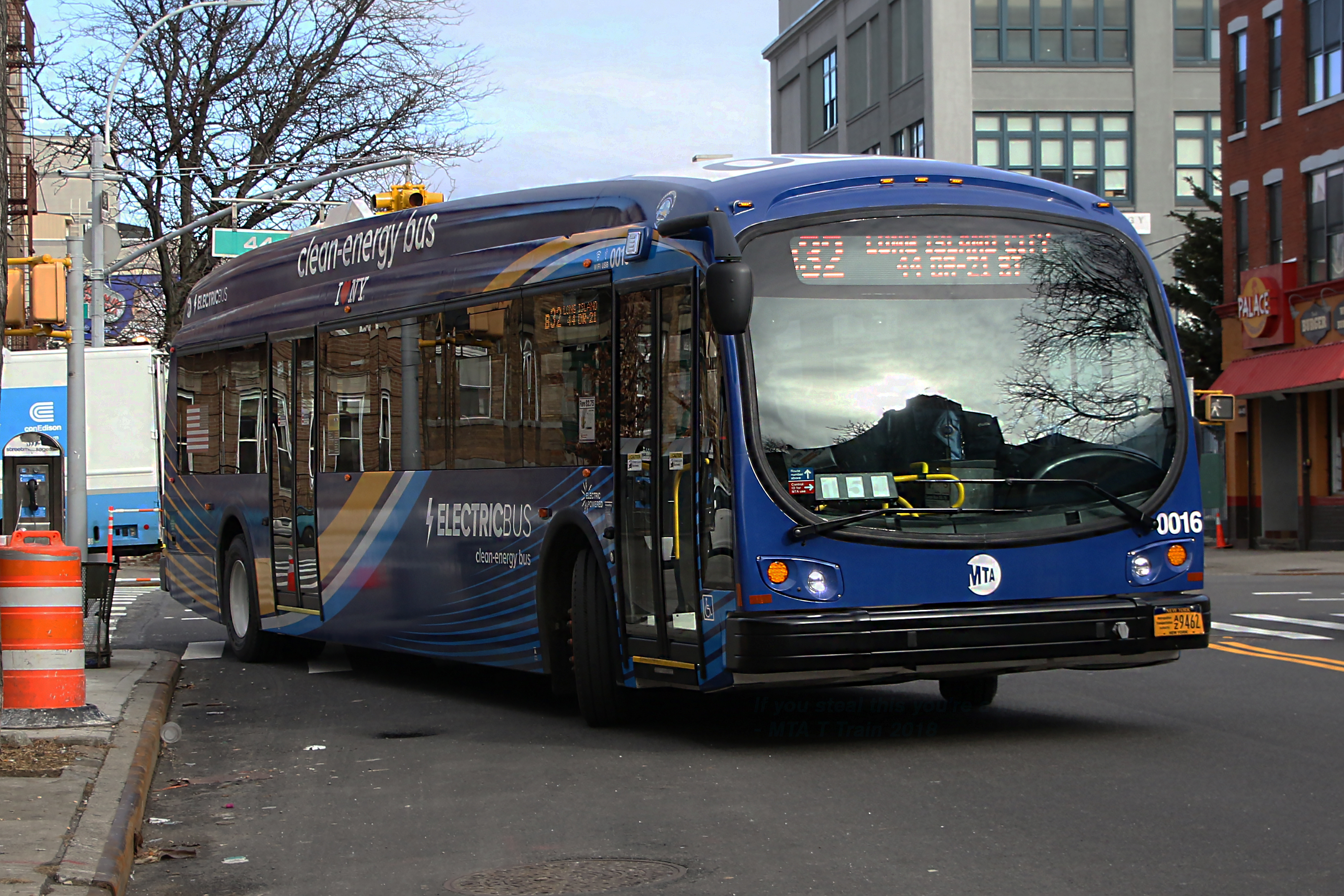
Catalyst BE40 of the New York MTA

Operator	Location	Model	Model Year(s)	Quantity
King County Metro	Seattle	BE40	2015	3
DC Circulator	Washington, D.C.	BE40	2017	14
NYMTA	New York City	BE40	2017	5
SEPTA	Philadelphia	BE40	2017	25
Toronto Transit Commission	Toronto	BE40	2019-2020	25
Chicago Transit Authority	Chicago	BE40	2020	25

== See also ==
Competing models

- New Flyer XE Xcelsior CHARGE
- BYD K9M
- Nova Bus LFSe and LFSe+
