= Proterra (bus manufacturer) =

American electric bus manufacturer

Proterra Inc.
- Type: Public
- Traded as: Nasdaq: PTRA (2021-23)
- Industry: Automotive
- Founded: 2004 in Golden, Colorado
- Founder: Dale Hill
- Defunct: March 2024
- Fate: Bankrupted
- Successor: Phoenix Motors
- Headquarters: Burlingame, California
- Area served: North America
- Key people: Gareth Joyce (President and CEO)
- Production output: ▲1,229 battery systems; ▼199 transit buses (2022)
- Revenue: ▲US$309.4 million (2022)
- Operating income: ▼US$(24) million (2022)
- Net income: ▼US$(238) million (2022)
- Number of employees: 1,247 (2022)
- Website: proterra.com
- Footnotes; Financials as of December 31, 2022. References

Proterra Inc. was an American electric vehicle and powertrain manufacturer based in Burlingame, California. The company designed and manufactured battery electric transit buses, powertrain systems for other heavy-duty vehicle builders and charging systems for fleets of heavy-duty vehicles.

Founded in 2004, it became a public company in June 2021. The company delivered 199 new transit buses and battery systems for 1,229 vehicles in 2022. The company filed for Chapter 11 bankruptcy in August 2023. In November, its assets were split into three divisions and sold off. The Proterra Powered powertrain manufacturing business line became an independent company within the Volvo Group. The transit bus manufacturing business line was sold to Phoenix Motorcars. The Proterra Energy business line, which built charging systems for fleets of heavy-duty vehicles, was purchased by Cowen Equity.

== History ==
Proterra was founded in Golden, Colorado by Dale Hill in 2004. Hill had previously founded TransTeq, a Denver, Colorado, bus manufacturing company, as well as Alumatech, a manufacturing company that made aluminum dump trailers. TransTeq was best known for building the fleet of "EcoMark" buses used on the 16th Street Mall in Denver that were series hybrids with batteries charged by a generator connected to a small compressed natural gas fueled engine.

Proterra would abandon the CNG technology used by its predecessor TransTeq, to take advantage of Federal Transit Administration's (FTA) push for alternative fuels and forms of mobility through such programs as the Clean Fuels Grant Program Bus and Bus Facilities, and the TIGER and TIGGER programs, which excluded CNG buses.

A prototype of the company's first product, the EcoRide, was first shown at the 2008 APTA Expo. The battery-electric bus had a composite body and range-extending hydrogen fuel cell auxiliary power unit (APU). Ultimately, the company decided to abandon the APU by the time the bus went on a tour of several cities in California in 2009. The prototype helped secure an order from Southern California's Foothill Transit, which received several EcoRide BE35 buses in 2010. The prototype bus was donated to the Museum of Bus Transportation in Hershey, Pennsylvania, and displayed there until it was sold in 2024.

In February 2010, Proterra announced that it would move its manufacturing plant from Golden to a location in Greenville, South Carolina, near the Clemson University International Center for Automotive Research (CU-ICAR). In October 2011, the company announced it would consolidate all operations in Greenville, moving management and research teams from Colorado.

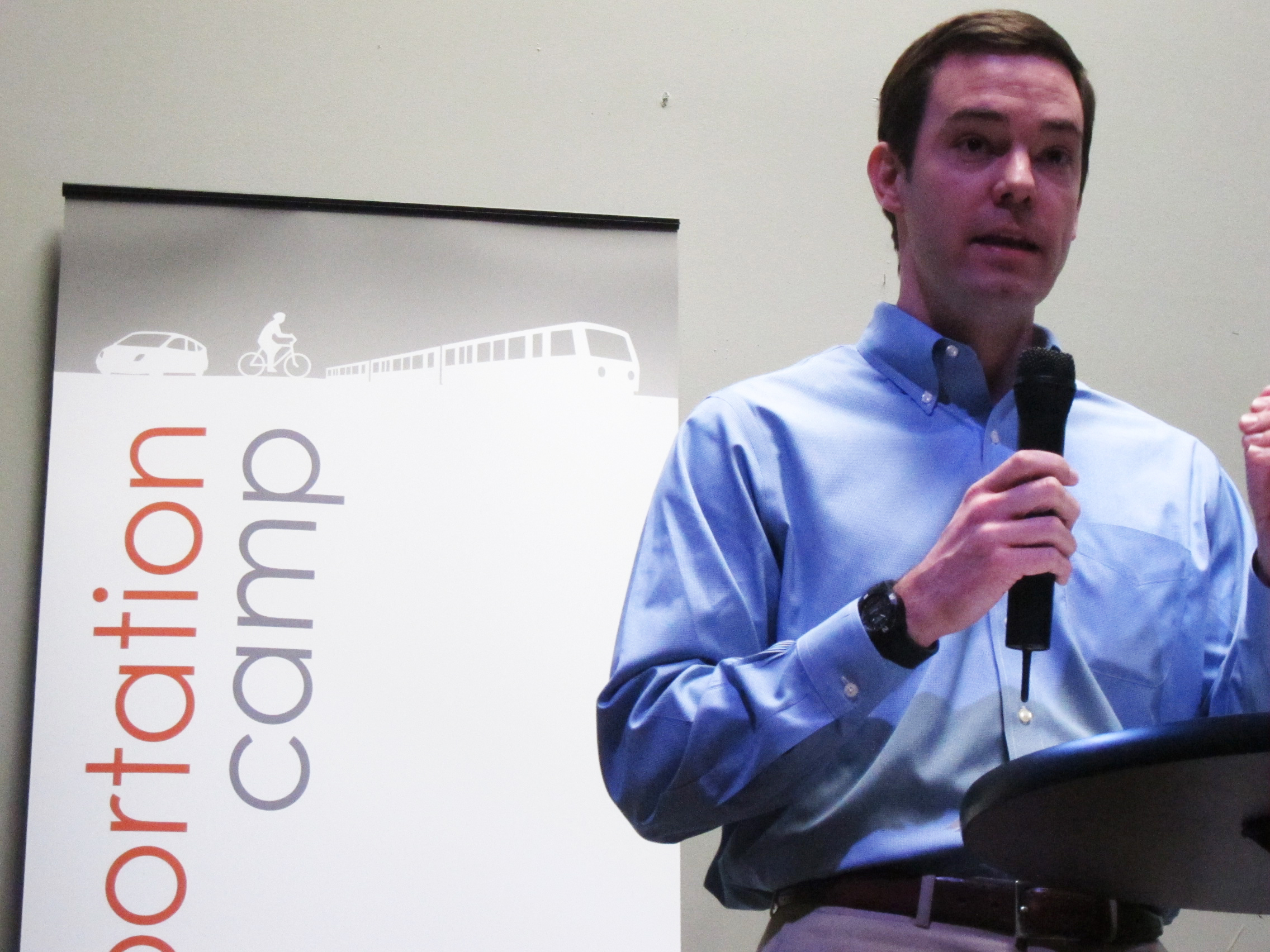
Ryan Popple, CEO of Proterra from 2014 to 2020, photographed in 2011

Ryan Popple, formerly of Tesla Motors, was appointed CEO in 2014. In 2015, Proterra was awarded a $3 million grant from the California Energy Commission to fund the design, development and construction of the company's battery-electric transit bus manufacturing line in the City of Industry, California. Proterra moved its headquarters from Greenville, South Carolina to Burlingame, California in October 2015. Popple served as CEO of Proterra until 2020, when board member Jack Allen was appointed CEO and Popple became the executive director. Popple continued to work at Proterra until his death in 2021

In January 2021, the company became publicly listed on the Nasdaq after a reverse takeover of a special-purpose acquisition company, ArcLight Clean Transition Corporation.

In December 2021, Gareth Joyce was appointed CEO, effective January 1, 2022, while Jack Allen retired from the CEO role but continued to serve on the board.

On August 7, 2023, Proterra filed for Chapter 11 bankruptcy protection. Among reasons cited for the bankruptcy were supply chain disruption, leading to penalties for not meeting supplier contract commitments and for subsequent delayed deliveries, as well as the nature of the business of producing highly customized products for each transit agency, and over a period of 12 to 18 months, during which inflation cut into margins.

In mid-November 2023, in the first of two bankruptcy proceedings, Volvo Group placed a winning $210 million bid for the Proterra Powered business line, which builds batteries and drivetrains for other heavy-duty vehicle builders. In the second auction, the transit bus manufacturing business line was sold to Phoenix Motorcars and the Proterra Energy business line which built charging systems for fleets of heavy-duty vehicles was purchased by Cowen Equity.

== Products ==
=== EcoRide (2010–2014) ===
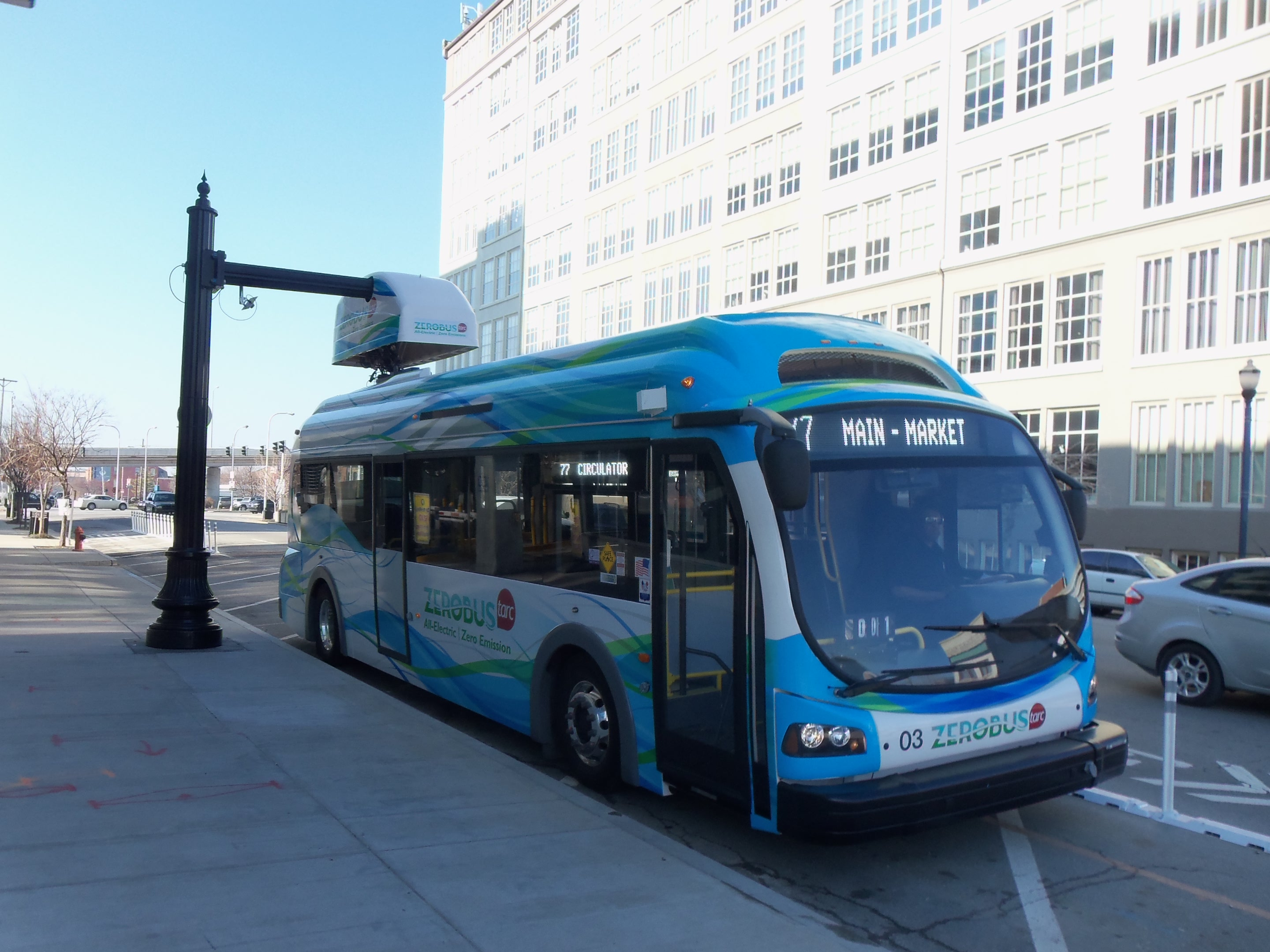
EcoRide operated by TARC docked in Proterra's proprietary overhead charger

The Proterra EcoRide was the first battery-electric bus offered by Proterra, first shown as a prototype at the 2008 APTA Expo in San Diego with a 35-foot (11 m) long composite body and range-extending hydrogen fuel cell auxiliary power unit (APU). The first EcoRide BE35, which omitted the APU, toured several cities in California in 2009. EcoRide was offered only with a lithium-titanate battery chemistry, which enabled fast on-route charging using the company's proprietary charger, but limited range. Foothill Transit was the launch customer, accepting delivery of several EcoRide BE35 buses in 2010.

The EcoRide was replaced by the larger Catalyst in 2014.

=== Catalyst (2014–2020) ===
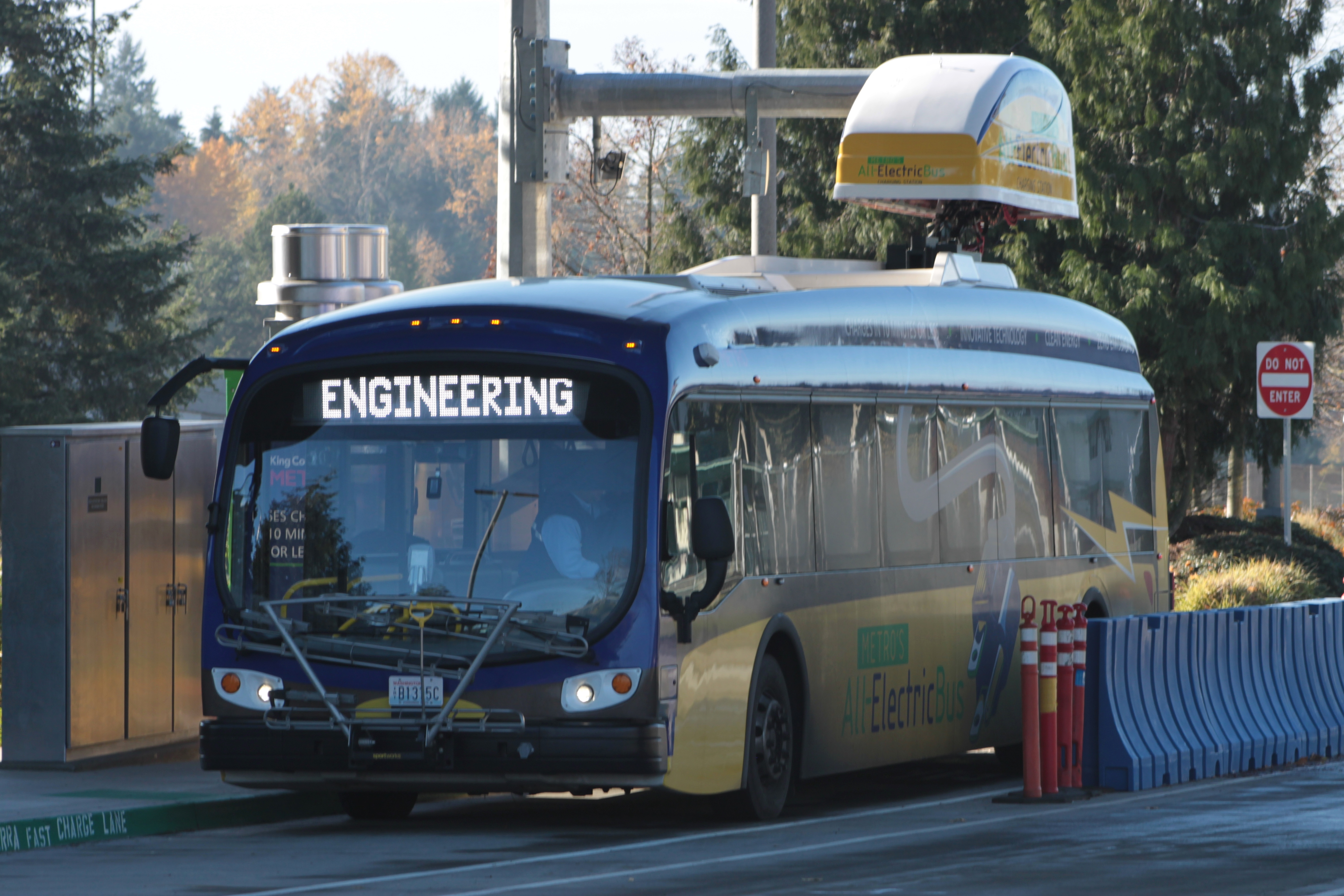
Catalyst operated by King County Metro Transit docked in Proterra's proprietary overhead charger

The Proterra Catalyst was an evolution of the EcoRide, initially available as a standard 40-foot (12 m) transit bus length in 2014 with the same fast-charging battery as the EcoRide and a similar composite chassis. A 35-foot (11 m) Catalyst was introduced in 2015 to directly replace the earlier EcoRide. Also in 2015, Proterra introduced the extended range (XR) battery, which offered greater range with slow charging at a storage yard. In 2016, Proterra introduced the Energy Efficient (E2) battery which offered even greater range. In 2017, a second drivetrain option featuring two traction motors for greater efficiency (branded DuoPower) was introduced. In 2018, Proterra discontinued its proprietary overhead "blade" charger in favor of the then standardized SAE J3105 charging options.

The Catalyst was replaced by the ZX5 line in 2020.

=== ZX5 (2020–2023) ===
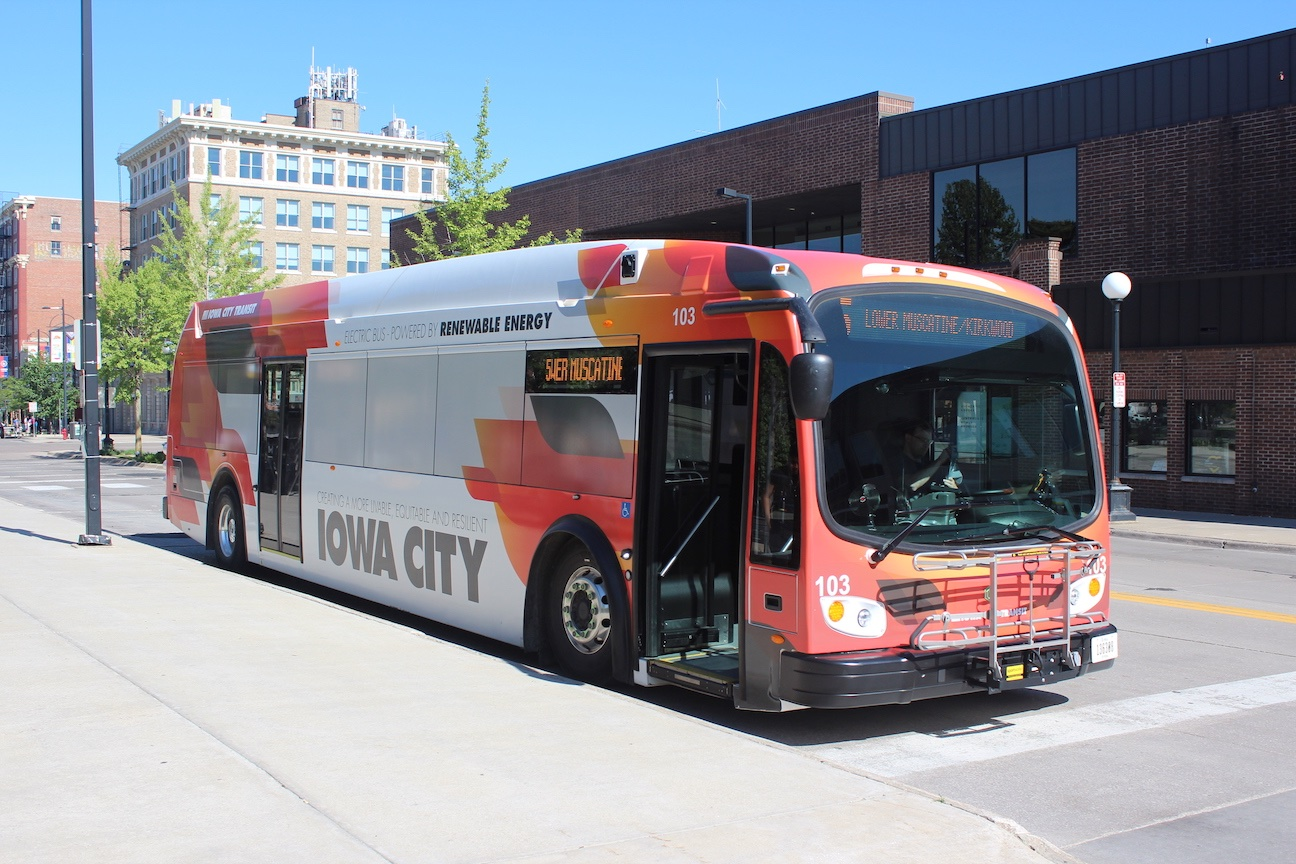
ZX5 operated by Iowa City Transit

The Proterra ZX5 was announced as the replacement to the Catalyst, available in 35-and-40-foot (11 and 12 m) nominal lengths. Edmonton Transit System of Edmonton, Alberta was the launch customer for the 40-foot ZX5.

The ZX5 features the same composite chassis as the Catalyst but incorporates several design changes. Visually, the vehicle appears more angular, while the roof fairing is more streamlined and 6 inches (150 mm) shorter. On the roof, provisions were added for additional battery packs and SAE J3105 (OppCharge) fast-charging rails.

The ZX5 is offered with multiple battery options, designated ZX5, ZX5+, and ZX5 MAX for the 220, 440, and 660 kWh models, respectively. Each of the three battery options is also offered with one of two drivetrains, which Proterra brands DuoPower (two traction motors) or ProDrive (single traction motor).

Originally a Proterra product, the ZX5 has been manufactured and offered by Phoenix Motorcars since 2024. Vehicles manufactured by Phoenix Motorcars no longer feature Proterra branding, instead using Phoenix's own.

=== Battery systems for others ===
Van Hool announced a partnership with Proterra in October 2017 to build an electric version of the CX45 motorcoach. The CX45E would be followed by a shorter CX35E model. Both of the Van Hool coaches were powered by the Proterra E2 battery.

Alexander Dennis has been offering an electric version of its Enviro500 double-decker bus with powertrains built by Proterra. The Enviro500EV will use Proterra E2 battery packs, on-board charging hardware, and thermal management.

Thomas Built Buses announced a partnership with Proterra in October 2018 to build an electric version of the Saf-T-Liner C2 school bus, called the "Jouley." The Jouley is equipped with 220 kWh of battery storage, providing an estimated range of 134 miles (216 km) and capable of recharging in three hours using 60 kW DC fast charging equipment provided by Proterra.

In November 2021, Proterra announced a battery deal with Colorado's Lightning eMotors, maker of passenger and cargo vans, shuttle buses and other fleet vehicles, for up to 10,000 vehicle battery systems in 2022-2025.

ENC announced a partnership with Proterra in September 2022 to build an electric version of the Axess transit bus, a direct competitor to the ZX5. The Axess EVO-BE is expected to be available in 2023 with 738 kWh of battery storage.

The partnerships with other bus OEMs led Proterra to announce in August 2019 the Proterra Powered initiative, which supports OEMs that are interested in using Proterra's battery-electric drivetrain for heavy-duty commercial vehicles.

In November 2023, Proterra's battery business was acquired by Swedish truck maker Volvo for $210 million.

== Development and manufacturing ==
Proterra has its headquarters and a battery manufacturing facility in Burlingame, California, located in Silicon Valley. Batteries are also manufactured in Southern California's City of Industry. The company has a transit bus assembly facility in Greenville, South Carolina that sits directly outside the Clemson University International Center for Automotive Research (CU-ICAR).

The company's composite bus bodies are supplied by TPI Composites using its factory in Warren, Rhode Island. TPI had previously developed a composite bus body for North American Bus Industries which was marketed as the Compobus. Proterra says that compared to a traditional steel body and frame, the composite body is lighter and allows most of the battery packs to be placed below the floor of the vehicle, between the axles, to achieve a low center of gravity.

Proterra offers a battery leasing program where customers pay for the price of the battery over time rather than upfront when the bus is purchased. The company says that many customers can make lease payments using their operational savings from reduced fuel and maintenance costs.

== Issues in Philadelphia ==
=== Chassis defects ===
25 Proterra buses, purchased by SEPTA in 2016 and delivered starting in June 2019 for transit service in Philadelphia, were pulled from service in February 2020. It was reportedly the third-largest electric bus fleet in the United States. SEPTA transit agency discovered defects in the composite chassis of the buses, including cracks that Proterra characterized as "non-structural" in May 2019 and failed equipment brackets in January 2020.

In a March 2021 email, SEPTA General Manager Leslie Richards said she planned to tell Federal Transit Administration officials that she had doubts about "the future of electric vehicle procurement," adding, "I plan on explaining why we do not feel the current technology is a good investment at this time." The FTA helped underwrite the initial purchase of Proterra buses with a US$2.6 million federal grant. SEPTA's chief vehicle engineering officer Dave Warner also said, "Proterra and its structural consultant … have been uncooperative in the resolution process."

Proterra's composite frames use a mix of resin, fiberglass, carbon fiber, balsa wood, and steel reinforcement plates, according to a SEPTA report on the cracks. Proterra's lawyers would later analogize the issue discovered by SEPTA to cracking paint applied to a metal frame, raising doubts the issue could ever be "fixed." "Proterra is unable to repair or permanently prevent the recurrence of cracking because it is an inherent part of the composite body material," wrote Josh Ensign, Proterra's chief operating officer.

A similar issue was identified in New York's Tompkins Consolidated Area Transit where the frame on one of their Proterra buses separated from the axle when it was positioned on a lift on March 13, 2024. Additionally, mechanics identified cracks in the fiber-glass body of one of their buses. Similar issues have not been reported by other US transit agencies; Delaware's DART First State stated their Proterra buses were not experiencing the same issues.

=== Fires ===
A massive SEPTA fire burned 40 busses in a storage lot. Investigators told SEPTA that the blaze was an electric fire caused by a lithium-ion battery, the energy storage devices used in buses manufactured by Proterra.

== See also ==
Competing transit bus manufacturers:

- New Flyer
- Gillig
- ENC
- Solaris Bus & Coach
- BYD Auto
