= Roscoe Dixon (businessman) =

African-American business owner, 1843–1916

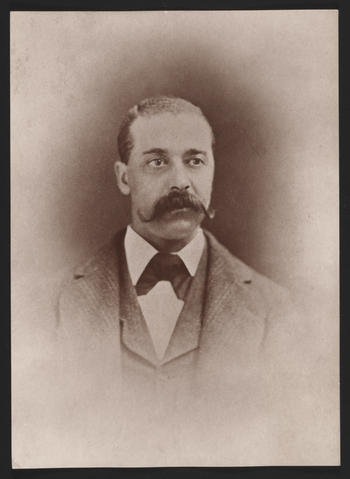
- Roscoe Dixon,1881
- Born: ca. 1843; Richmond, Virginia,
- Died: January 1916; Seattle, Washington,
- Occupation: Businessman
- Known for: First black business owner in Astoria, Oregon
- Spouse: Theresa Brown
- Children: 3

Roscoe Dixon (c. 1843 – January 1916) was the first known Black business owner in Astoria, Oregon. He ran "Roscoe's First Class Oyster Saloon", open from 1881 to 1885.

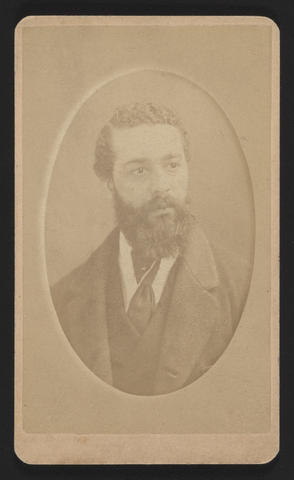
Roscoe Dixon, 1880, Oregon Historical Society

== Early life ==
Roscoe Dixon was born in 1843 to Agnes, an enslaved woman, in Richmond, Virginia. By 1850, Agnes escaped with her two children, Roscoe and Robert Dixon, and George Lee, on the Underground Railroad to New Bedford, Massachusetts. While Agnes remained in New Bedford until at least 1885, brothers Robert and Roscoe headed west by 1870.

== Work and business ==
Dixon worked in Portland, Oregon, as a cook and oyster-man at the Gem Saloon in 1874. He moved to Astoria, Oregon, by 1881 and opened "Roscoe's First Class Oyster Saloon" on Main Street. The Daily Astorian called Dixon's business a "first class Oyster Saloon". It is credited as the first known Black-owned business in Astoria, closing in 1885.

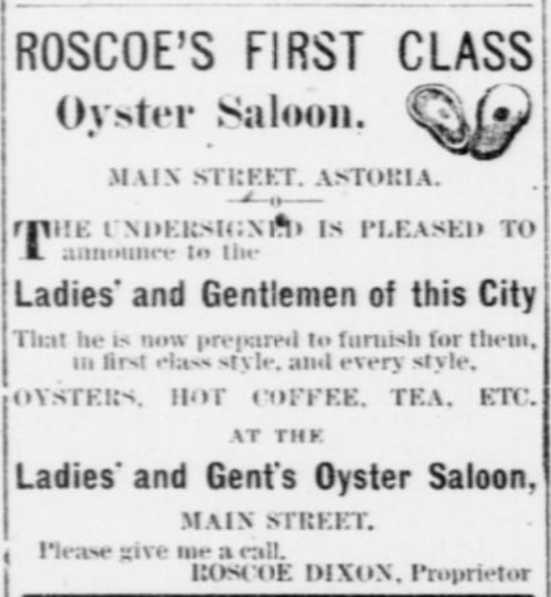
Advertisement for the opening of Roscoe's First Class Oyster Saloon, The Daily Astorian, 15 March 1881

After the closing of the saloon, the Dixon family traveled up the West Coast all the way to British Columbia, eventually settling in Seattle, Washington, in 1894.

== Family ==
Dixon married Theresa Brown, originally from Macon, Georgia. Accounts vary of the date of their union, citing both 1880 and 1892. Theresa trained as a nurse and worked as a midwife into the 1920s before her death in 1927.

Roscoe and Theresa had three children: Chester Ingersoll Dixon, born in Astoria, Oregon, in November 1882; Christine Mabel, born in Victoria, B.C., in November 1885; and Theresa Virginia Flowers in Seattle, Washington, in December 1894.

Robert Dixon, Roscoe's brother, resettled in Seattle, Washington in 1865. In 1883, Robert married Rebecca Grose, daughter of Black pioneers William Grose and Sarah Grose.

== Legacy ==
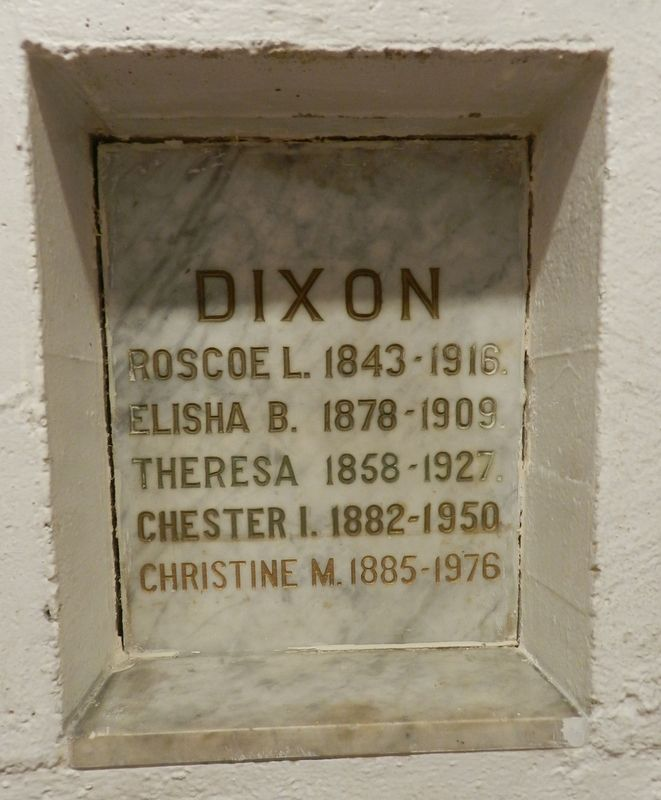
Dixon family grave

In 1984, Dixon's daughter, Theresa Virginia Flowers, donated to the Oregon Historical Society a collection of photographs of the Dixon and Flowers families, recognizing two prominent early Black families living on the West Coast. In 2024, the Oregon Historical Society digitized the collection and released them on its website, Oregon Historical Society Digital Collections.

Portland-based artist Jeremy Okai Davis included Dixon in his commissioned collection, "ReEnvisioned: Contemporary Portraits of Our Black Ancestors", exhibited at the Bush Gallery in Salem, Oregon, in 2025.
