= Central District, Seattle =

Neighborhood of Seattle, Washington, U.S.

- Seattle Neighborhood
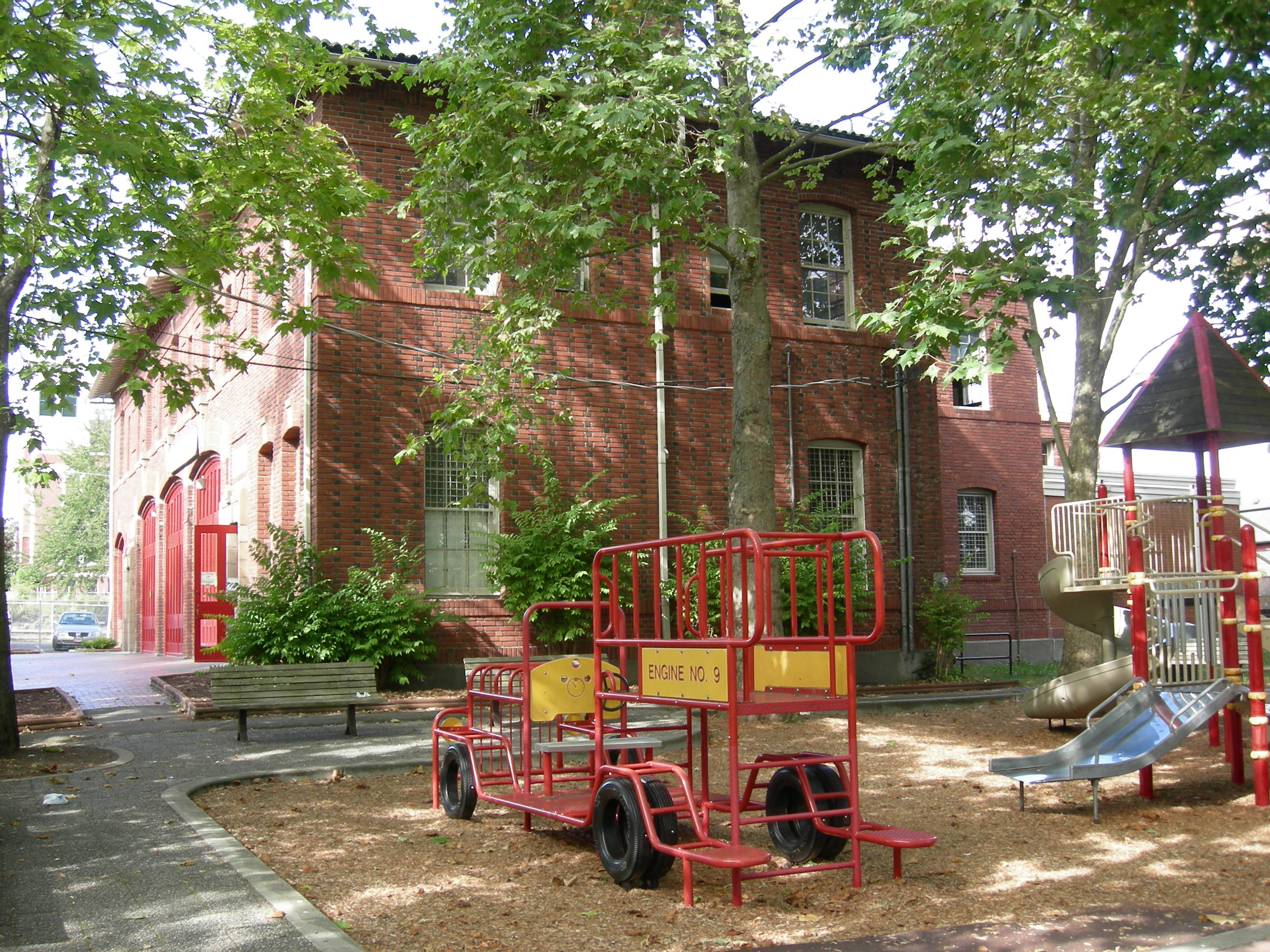
- Firehouse Mini Park and the Cherry Hill Community Center: the former Firehouse No. 23, headquarters of the Central Area Motivation Program. The building is on the National Register of Historic Places.
- Nicknames: Central Area, CD
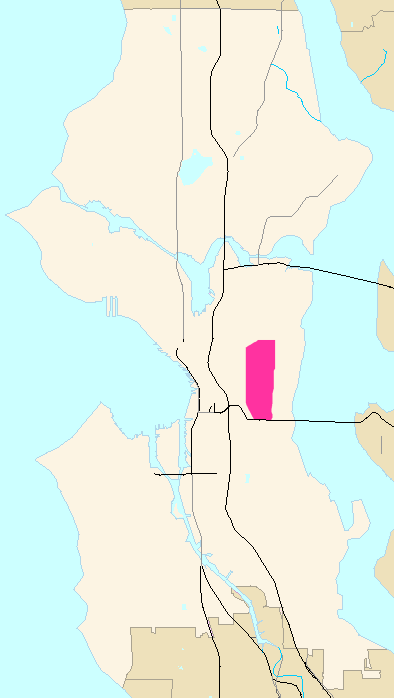
- Central District Highlighted in Pink
- Coordinates: 47°36′31″N 122°17′46″W
- Country: United States
- State: Washington
- County: King
- City: Seattle
- ZIP Code: 98122, 98144
- Area code: 206, 564

The Central District (commonly called the Central Area or The CD) is a mostly residential neighborhood in Seattle located east of downtown and First Hill (12th Avenue and Rainier Avenue); west of Madrona, Leschi and Mt. Baker neighborhoods; south of Capitol Hill, and north of Rainier Valley. Historically, the Central District has been one of Seattle's most racially and ethnically diverse neighborhoods, and was once the center of Seattle's black community and a major hub of African-American businesses.

== History and demographics ==
The culture and demographics of the Central District have changed repeatedly throughout many years. In 1882, William Grose purchased 12 acres of land in what was known as Madison Valley from Henry Yesler. Grose was already an established businessman in Seattle at the time, and his development of the area helped to establish the Central District as an African-American community. He sold parcels of the land to other Black families while running his own modest farm on the land, on which he grew produce and raised animals for use in his hotel downtown. The area was thickly wooded at the time and slowly developed by Grose and others.

In 1889 the Madison Street Cable Car began service up the hill into the area, and more Black families moved in. Some have described a subsequent White flight that followed the migration of more Black people to the area.

In 1927, white homeowners began a concerted effort to redline the area. Unlike other redlining efforts in the United States, the neighborhood was already established as a home to African-American, Jewish, and Asian families because of the distribution of land by Grose. So this area was more boxed in so that certain people would not be able to buy or rent land elsewhere.

In the early 20th century, the Central District also established itself as a largely Jewish neighborhood. Jewish residents built Temple De Hirsch on Union Street in 1907; Temple De Hirsch Sinai on the opposite corner of the same block is a successor to that congregation; the original Temple De Hirsch is largely demolished, though some fragments remain. Other former synagogues in the neighborhood are the former Sephardic Bikur Holim synagogue (now Tolliver Temple), Herzl Congregation synagogue (later Odessa Brown Clinic, as of 2023 home to two private schools), and Chevra Bikur Cholim (now Langston Hughes Performing Arts Center).

A few decades later, the Central District became a home to Japanese-Americans in Seattle. The blocks between 14th and 18th Avenues and Yesler Way and Jackson Street still retain a strong Japanese presence—Faith Bible Church, the Buddhist Church, Seattle Koyasan Church, Konko, Wisteria Park, Japanese Congregational Church, Keiro Nursing Home, and the Kawabe Memorial House. During World War II, presidential Executive Order 9066 made possible the removal of American citizens of Japanese descent from the West Coast. All Japanese residents were immediately taken out of their homes and sent to internment camps.

This and many race-restricted covenants to the north and south paved the way for more African Americans to find a new home in the Central District as part of the Second Great Migration to the city in search of employment opportunities in the munitions plants during the war as well as taking advantage of the post-war economic expansion. By the 1970s, Central District was a largely an African-American neighborhood and the center of the civil rights movement in Seattle. In 1970, Black people made up nearly 80 percent of the neighborhood's population. However, the neighborhood declined with increased rates of poverty and crime over the following two decades.

In the early 21st century, several demographic trends are changing the population of the Central District again. Low-income segments of the population are moving southward toward the Rainier Valley, while more affluent residents, who might otherwise have purchased homes on Capitol Hill, Madrona, Leschi, or Mt. Baker are moving into the Central District as real estate and rental property become more expensive in the former neighborhoods and commuting times and costs make suburban areas less attractive.

Due to this market pressure, housing in the Central District is mixed, with some homes on the verge of condemnation, and others having recently undergone extensive renovation. Many condemned houses are being replaced by multi-unit townhouses and condominiums. Easy access to Interstate 5, Interstate 90, and Downtown, as well as ample street parking, also make the Central District an attractive and convenient place to live.

Despite the demographic shifts since the early 1970s, many locals still think of the Central District as a predominantly African-American area. One reason for this is that despite the decline in the African-American population, there is black history in the neighborhood. It is home to the Northwest African American Museum; the Liberty Bank Building, the historic site of the first black-owned bank in Seattle; Medgar Evers Pool; and the Second Headquarters of the Seattle Black Panther Party and The People's Wall. In 2022, the William Grose Center for Cultural Innovation and Enterprise was opened by a non-profit organization, Africatown Community Land Trust. The center is built in the repurposed Fire Station 6, home to Seattle's first Black firefighters, building that had long sat vacant until the city of Seattle leased the building to Africatown Community Land Trust for 99 years in 2020.

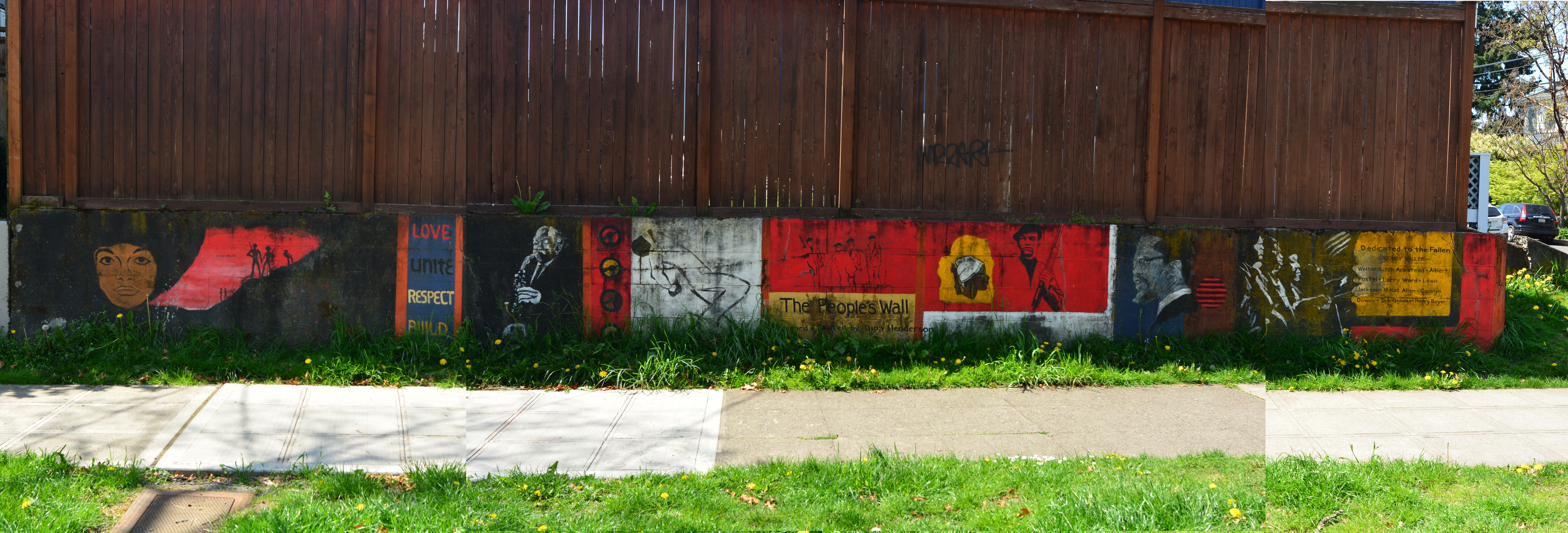
The People's Wall, painted in 1970 by Dion Henderson, is the last remnant of the Second Headquarters of the Seattle Black Panther Party. Photographed 2023.

During the early 1960s, the neighborhood was a hotbed for the Seattle civil rights movement. In 1963, civil rights protesters took to the streets and protested against racial discrimination. Later, they participated in a sit-in in downtown Seattle. At the same time, the Black Panther Party used the neighborhood as a staging area for their movement.

As of 2010 the total population of the Central Area is 29,868 with a population that is 59.6% White or Caucasian, 21.4% Black or African-American, 9.1% Asian, 0.6% Native American, 0.3% Pacific Islander, 3.2% from other races and 6.1% from two or more races. Hispanic or Latino of any race consisted of 7.3% of the population.

== Notable residents ==
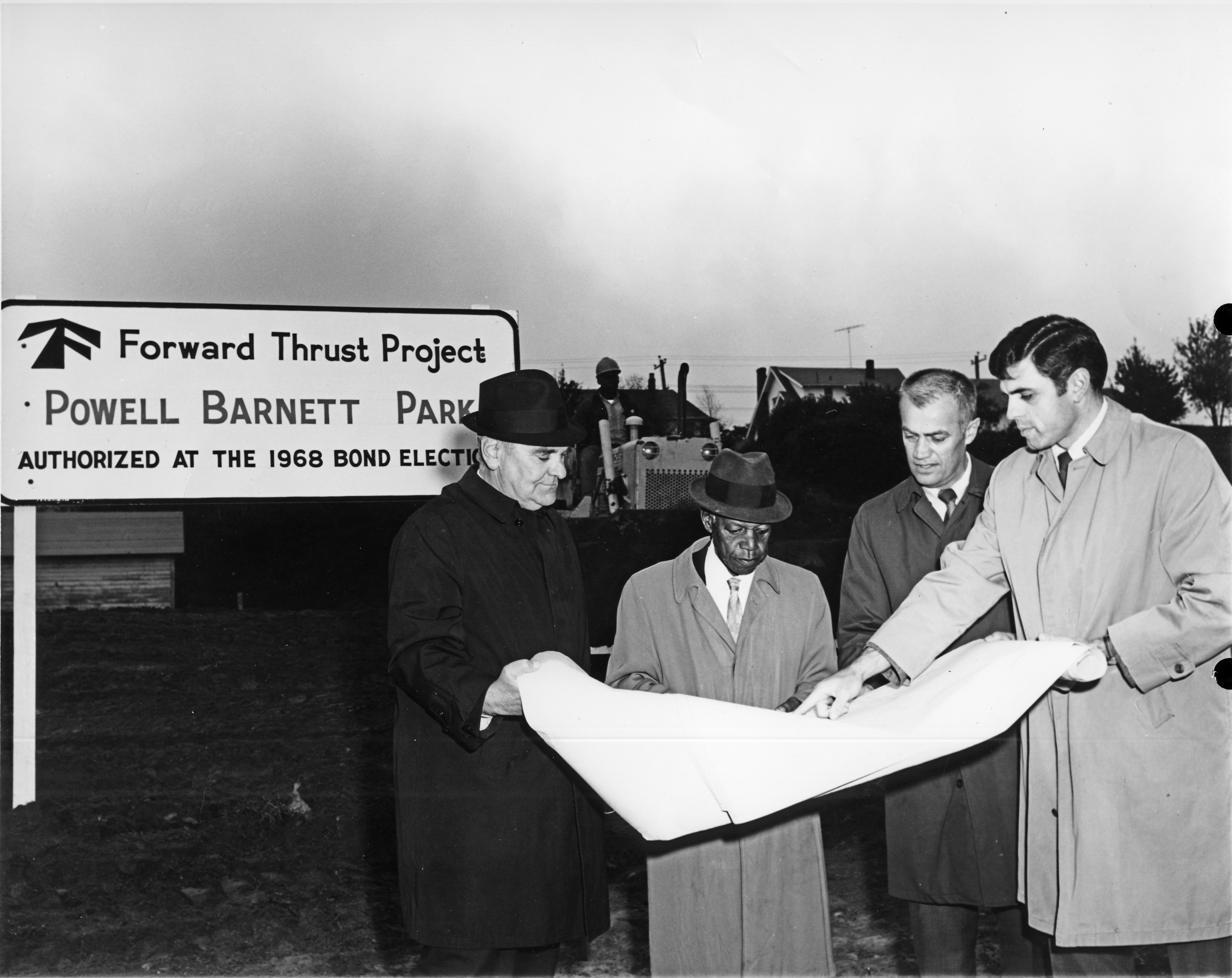
Athlete, musician, and community activist Powell Barnett (second from left) in 1970, looking at the plans for the park named after him on the east side of Martin Luther King, Jr. Way (then Empire Way) between E. Alder and E. Jefferson Streets.

- William Grose
- Ernestine Anderson
- Linda Emery
- Jimi Hendrix
- Quincy Jones
- Kyle Townsend
- Bruce Lee
- Rose McGowan
- Brandon Roy
- Isaiah Stanback
- Sir Mix-a-Lot
- Kip Tokuda
- NoClue
- DeCharlene Williams
- Omari Salisbury

== Transportation ==
The Central District's main thoroughfares includes its east boundary along Martin Luther King Jr. Way ("MLK"), its west boundaries along 12th Avenue and Rainier Avenue, and its 'main street' 23rd Avenue (north and southbound). Major east–west streets in the neighborhood include E. Union, E. Cherry, E. Jefferson, E. Yesler Way, and S. Jackson.

=== Public transit ===
King County Metro operates several bus routes in the Central District that connect the neighborhood to Downtown Seattle, Capitol Hill, Mount Baker, and the University District. The RapidRide G Line, a limited-stop bus rapid transit route, launched in September 2024 and serves the north end of the neighborhood on Madison Street. The Central District's primary north–south bus corridor, Route 48 on 23rd Avenue, is planned to be converted into an electric trolleybus route by 2026 following the completion of electrical wiring over the street. It is also a candidate for future conversion into a RapidRide route by 2050.

The Link light rail 2 Line, operated by Sound Transit, serves the neighborhood at Judkins Park Station in the southern Central District. The station is located within the median of Interstate 90 between Rainier Avenue to the west and 23rd Avenue to the east.

== Public parks and greenspaces ==
The Central District is home to at least 18 public parks, and community green spaces. Notable parks include: T.T. Minor Playground, Firehouse Mini Park, Garfield Playfield, Pratt Park, Dr. Blanche Lavizzo Park, Judkins Park and Playfield, Judkins Skatepark, Jimi Hendrix Park, William Grose Park, and Sam Smith Park. The Central District is home to 4 P-Patch Community Gardens: Immaculate P-Patch at E Columbia Street and 18th Avenue, Squire Park at 14th Avenue and E Fir Street, Climbing Water at 800 Hiawatha Pl S, and Judkins at 24th Avenue S and S Norman Street.

== Landmarks and institutions ==
Landmarks and institutions

- Northwest African American Museum
- Bullitt Center
- Langston Hughes Performing Arts Center
- The Nova Project
- Washington Hall

Schools

- Garfield High School

Restaurants, Bars & Shops

- Ezell's Chicken
- DeCharlene's Beauty Salon
- Quick Pack Food Mart
