= Trolleybuses in Seattle =

Electric transit system in Washington, US

Seattle trolleybus system
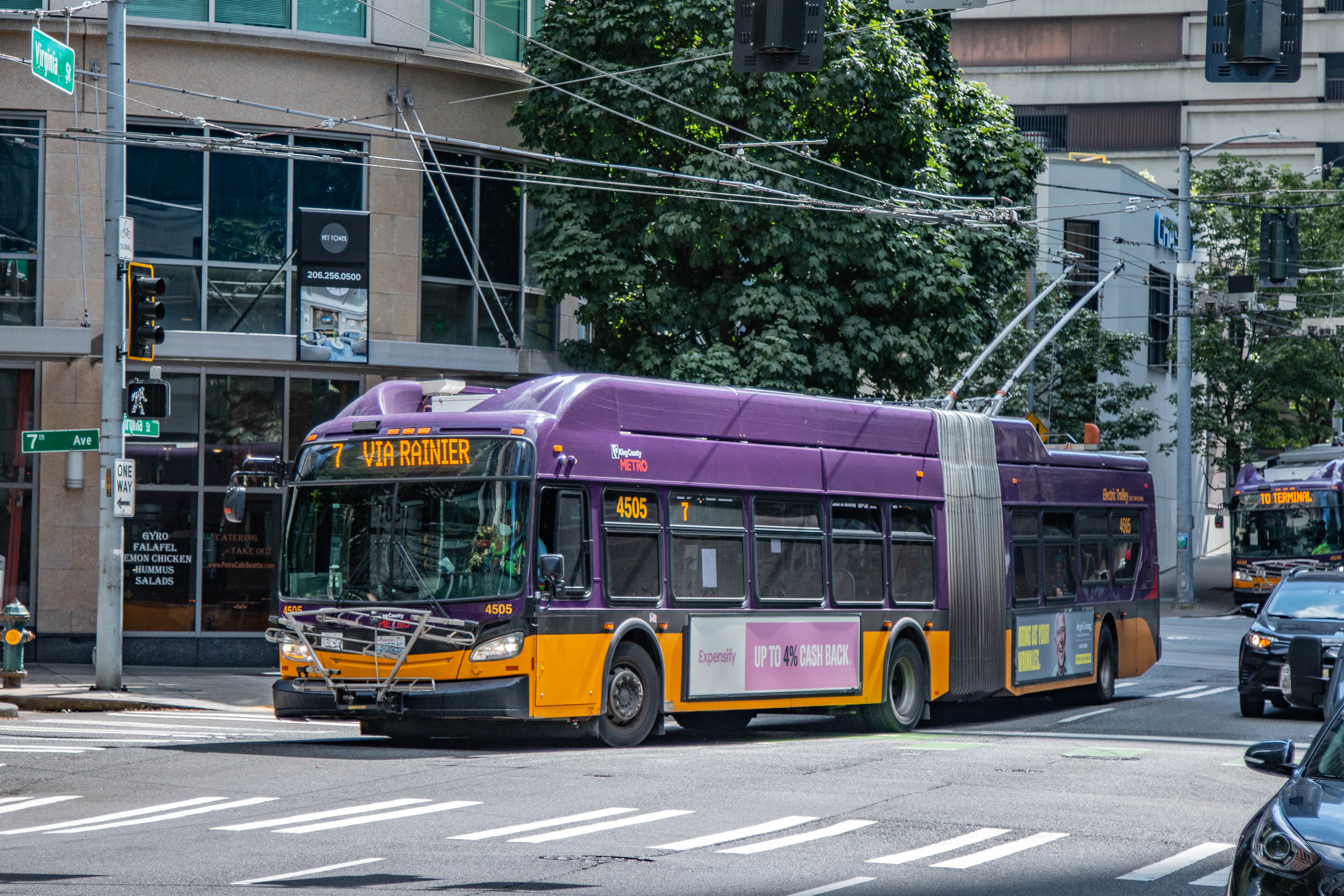
- New Flyer Xcelsior XT60 trolleybus on route 7 in Seattle

Operation
- Locale: Seattle, Washington, United States
- Open: April 28, 1940; 86 years ago
- Status: Operating
- Routes: 15
- Operators: 1940–1972: Seattle Transit System; 1973–1994: Municipality of Metropolitan Seattle; 1994–present: King County Metro

Infrastructure
- Electrification: Parallel overhead lines, 700 V DC
- Depot: Atlantic Base
- Stock: 110 New Flyer Xcelsior XT40; 64 New Flyer Xcelsior XT60

Statistics
- Route length: 68 mi (109 km)
- 2025 ridership: 10,530,400

The Seattle trolleybus (or "trolley") system forms part of the public transportation network in the city of Seattle, Washington, operated by King County Metro. Originally opened on April 28, 1940, the network consists of 14 routes, with 174 trolleybuses operating on 68 miles (109 km) of two-way parallel overhead lines. As of the second quarter of 2026, the system carries riders on an average of 43,900 trips per weekday, comprising about 18 percent of King County Metro's total daily ridership.

Of the four trolleybus systems currently operating in the U.S., the Seattle system is the second largest (by ridership and fleet size), after the San Francisco system.

== History ==
=== From tracks to tires ===
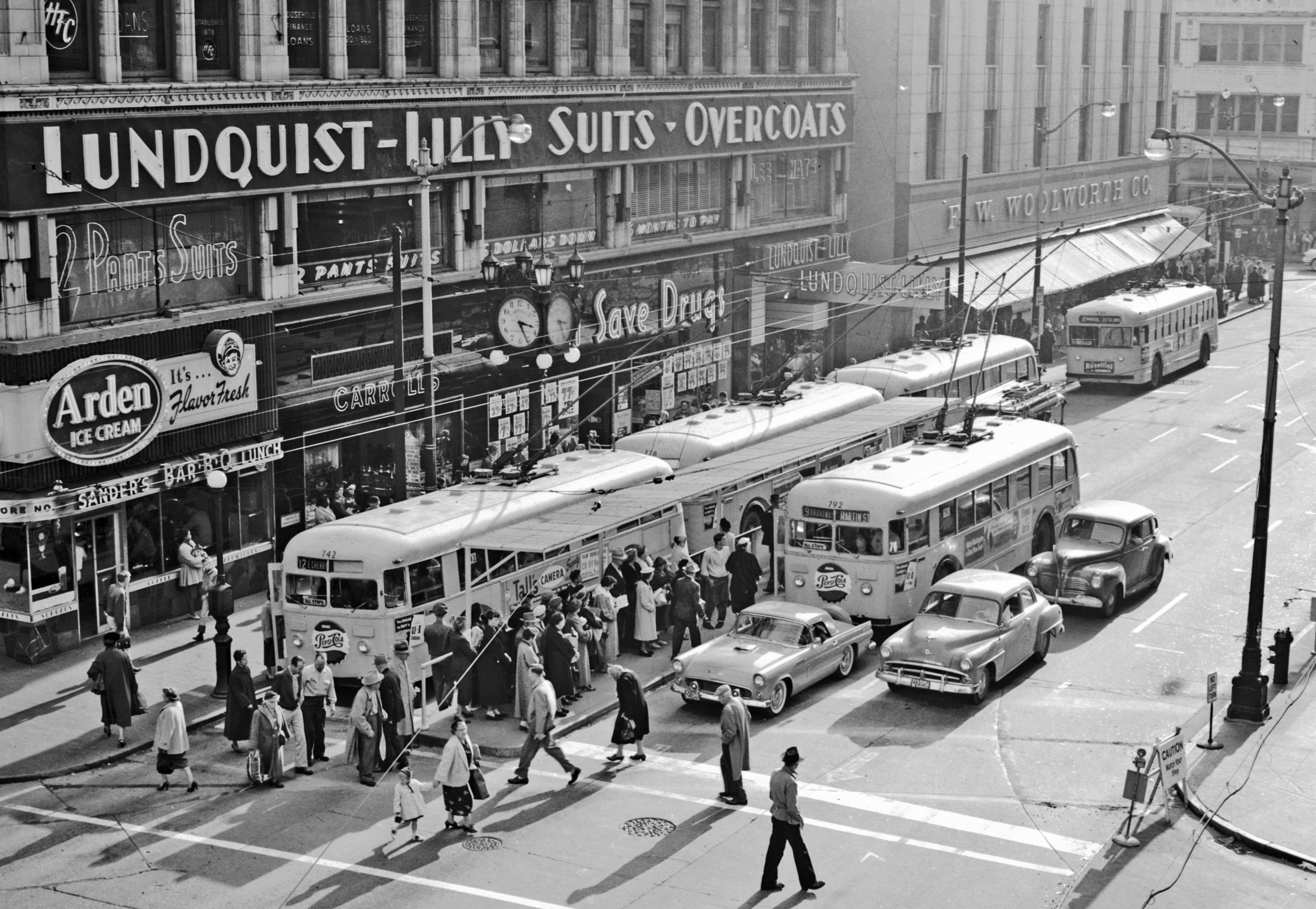
Several PCF–Brill trolleybuses and one Twin Coach on Pike Street in Downtown Seattle in 1956

The first trolleybus to operate on Seattle's streets was in 1937. It was brought to the city for a demonstration to gain public support for a plan to replace the debt-ridden streetcar and cable car system with a "trackless trolley" system. The demonstration was a success, but still reeling from the impacts of the Great Depression, Seattle voters rejected the plan in a municipal election on March 9, 1937.

In 1939, Seattle received a federal loan that allowed the city to retire the debts from the streetcar and cable car system. Management of system was turned over to an independent commission and renamed the Seattle Transit System (STS). The commission immediately began construction on overhead wire and ordered 235 new trolleybuses, the first of which started arriving in March 1940. The first trolleybus went into revenue service April 28, 1940, on route 13 which ran along 19th Avenue in Capitol Hill (which is still served by trolleybuses today on route 12). The system expanded again during World War II, when the Office of Defense Transportation gave Seattle more trolleybuses to meet increased wartime transportation demands, bringing the fleet to 307 coaches. Ridership reached an all-time high 130 million riders in 1944. After the war, ridership on the trolleybus system declined as many American families began purchasing automobiles.

=== An uncertain future ===
The city's aging trolleybuses were spiffed up, and the overhead wire expanded in 1962 to serve the World's Fair, but citywide the Seattle Transit System was increasingly abandoning the trolley routes. One year later in 1963, the commission retired 175 trolleybuses and tore down the overhead wire in the north end of the city and West Seattle. A group of citizens protested the abandonment of the trolley routes with an initiative to voters in 1964, but it failed at the polls.

By the end of the 1960s, the trolleybus system had been reduced to just 59 coaches operating on 30 miles of overhead wire. Seattle Transit System management defended the move claiming cost savings from using diesel-powered buses, the high cost of electrifying new routes and the lack of any new trolley coaches on the market. Under fire from the public, the commission ordered an independent study. That study contradicted the claims of management, concluding that trolleybuses perform better than diesel powered buses on Seattle's hills and that operating costs were comparable (except for overhead wire maintenance).

By 1970, the Seattle Transit System was facing mounting financial problems, leading voters to eliminate the commission and turn over operation of the system to the city. Voters spoke once again in 1972 when they approved the merger of the now city-owned Seattle Transit System and the privately held Metropolitan Transit Corporation into a single, countywide transit system under the auspices of the Municipality of Metropolitan Seattle (better known as Metro). Metro had promised voters that it would keep the trolleybus system if the transfer of the transit system to Metro was approved. There had been "prolonged and vocal [public] opposition to the 1970 conversions" of routes 3 and 4 to motor buses, leading city officials to begin working to ensure that the system would survive under Metro. Furthermore, the city was interested in expanding the system, in light of the fuel shortages and price increases observed during the 1973 oil crisis, and in 1974 it formally asked Metro to add 27.5 route mile and up to 63 vehicles. The proposed expansion was later scaled-back slightly, but the final plan agreed to by the City and Metro would eventually see the system expand from 55 vehicles to 109 and from 32 route miles to 55 by 1981, in addition to replacement of all of the old fleet and infrastructure with new.

=== Rebirth of the trolleybus system ===
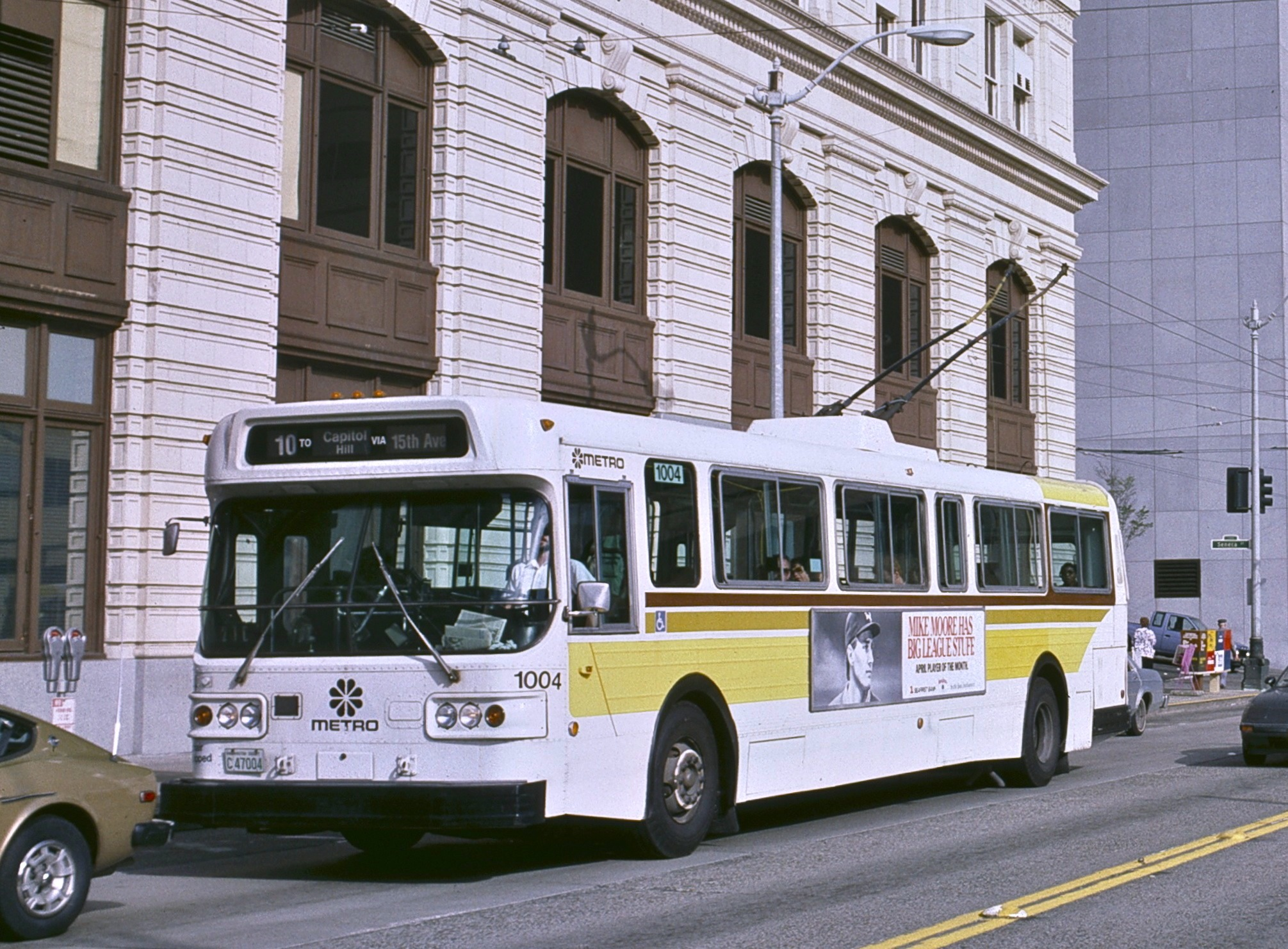
AM General trolleybus on route 10 in Downtown Seattle in 1986

The new Metro Transit began operation on January 1, 1973, and in 1974 it began working on fleshing-out the plans to rehabilitate and expand Seattle's trolleybus network, hiring a consulting firm in 1975 to carry out the technical aspects of the design. On January 21, 1978, the system was shut down, and while passengers rode diesel-powered coaches, crews began installing new overhead wire, switches, and a new power distribution system. In 1977, Metro placed an order for 109 AM General trolleys, the first new trolleybuses for the city since the 1940s. The first of these was delivered in April 1979. The first routes were back in trolley service on September 15, 1979. Over the next two years, more routes were placed back into service as construction was completed and new coaches delivered. By the summer of 1981, the entire trolley system was back up and running.

In addition to modernization, the 1978–1981 rebuilding included expansion, resurrecting several closed routes and adding a long, new route to Ballard. These included former routes 3-North Queen Anne – Jefferson Park and 4-East Queen Anne – Montlake, which STS had closed in 1970. The Downtown-to-Queen Anne portions of those routes were reinstated with the same route numbers. The Jefferson Park trolleybus route was reinstated as route 1, connected to route 1-Kinnear, but extended from Spokane Street to Dawson Street, 1.1 mi (1.8 km) farther south than the old route had run. The former route 4-Montlake was revived as route 43, Downtown–Montlake–University District and extended west with a new, never-before-existing section of trolleybus route between the University District and Ballard. Former route 9-Broadway was also replaced by route 7 and extended across the University Bridge to the University District, returning trolleybus service to much of former route 7-15th Avenue NE, which had been abandoned as a trolleybus service in 1963. Other corridors were also considered but ultimately rejected for trolleybus service, including Aurora Avenue. The reconversion of route 7 and conversion of route 43 to trolleybuses reinstated trolleybus operation across the University Bridge and Montlake Bridge, from which it had been removed in 1963 and 1970, respectively. Since 1984, with the closure of the 1911 Cambie Street Bridge in Vancouver, these two drawbridges have been the only movable bridges in the Western Hemisphere still crossed by trolleybuses. (The University Bridge is currently crossed by routes 49 and 70 and the Montlake Bridge by route 43.)

By 1981, Metro started to consider the future of the remaining 1940s trolleybuses, which had been in storage since the beginning of the system rehabilitation in 1978. A group of employees founded the Metro Employees Historic Vehicle Association (MEHVA) in December 1981 to preserve, restore and operate some of the vintage coaches. Under the agreement, Metro maintained ownership of the historic fleet, providing insurance coverage, storage space, work space and spare parts on an 'as available' basis. The first trolleybus to be restored by MEHVA was 1944 Pullman-Standard No. 1005, and regular public excursions around the trolleybus system with No. 1005 began in 1985. In the summer of the following year, MEHVA scheduled three four-hour excursions and six one-hour trips, but the number was much smaller in subsequent years, with three or four per year. Since the early 1990s, MEHVA has normally operated two vintage-trolleybus excursions per year: a four-hour daytime trip and a 2 ½-hour evening trip, and this pattern continues as of 2017. Operation of historic trolleybuses has also taken place for special events, such as the commemoration of the 60th anniversary of the Seattle trolleybus system, in April 2000. In the years since MEHVA has continued to add additional trolley and motor buses to the historic fleet. (As of the end of 2025, public excursions using historic trolleybuses have been suspended since October 2019. All MEHVA excursions were suspended in 2019, initially because of questions related to insurance coverage and later for reasons related to the COVID-19 pandemic, but public excursions with motorbuses resumed in August 2025, and trolleybus excursions may resume eventually.)

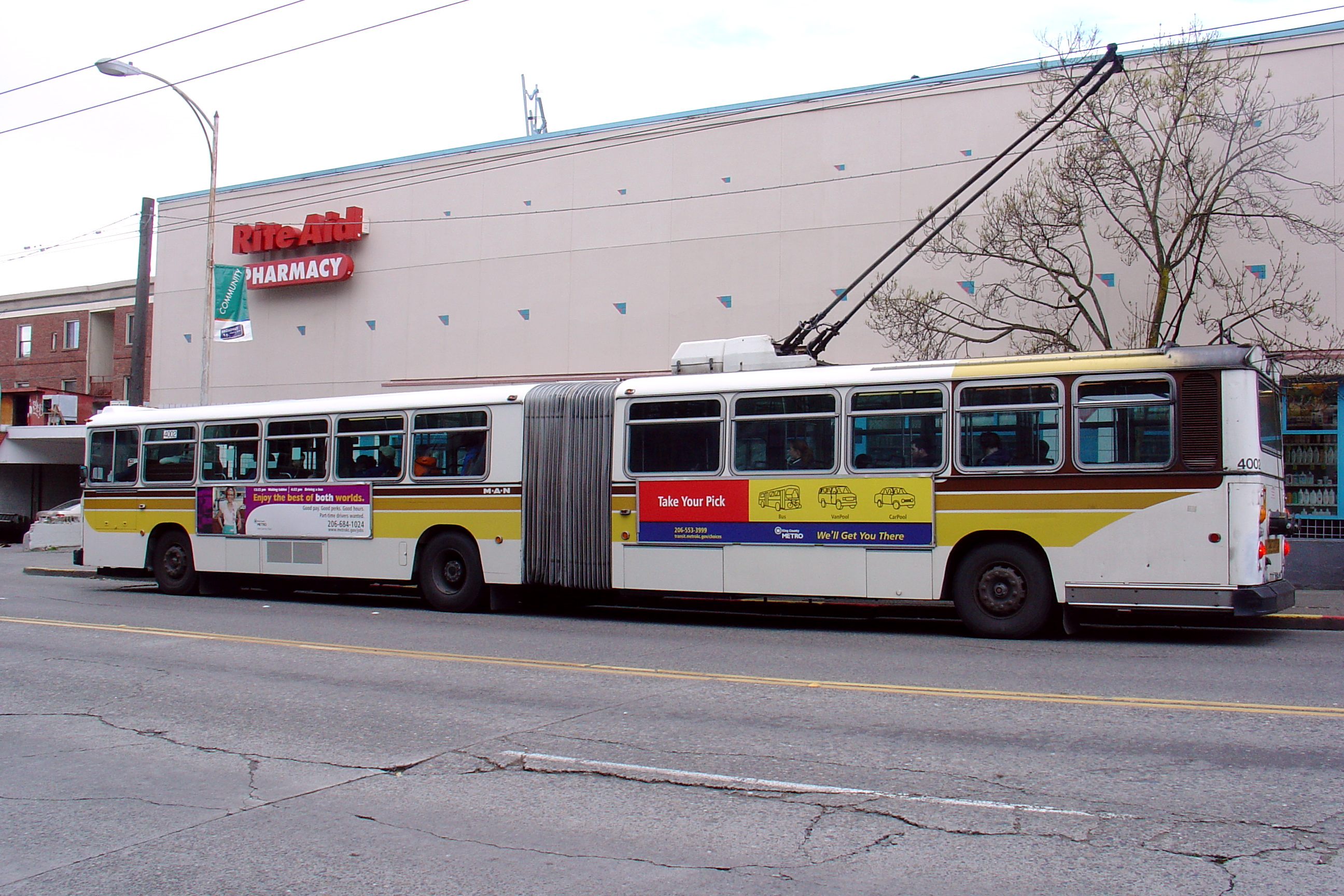
MAN articulated trolleybus on route 43 in Seattle's Capitol Hill neighborhood in 2003

Sixty-foot-long articulated trolleybuses were added to the fleet in 1986–87. The 46 coaches, designed by MAN of West Germany and built at a North Carolina MAN plant, were assigned to the busy routes 7 and 43, equivalent to present-day routes 7, 49, 43 and 44 (before a 1993 splitting of route 43 into routes 43 and 44, and a 2005 splitting of route 7 into routes 7 and 49), all of which continue to use articulated trolleybuses today. These were the first articulated trolleybuses in North America, other than single experimental vehicles or manufacturer demonstrators on loan, and they began to enter service in April 1987.

The construction of the Downtown Seattle Transit Tunnel under 3rd Avenue beginning in 1986 forced many of the trolleybus routes to be rerouted to 1st Avenue for several years. Once construction was finished, the trolleybuses returned to Third Avenue and the tunnel opened on September 15, 1990. The tunnel introduced the dual-mode Breda DuoBus 350 (ADPB 350) coaches that operated on overhead wire underground, which drove the center axle, and diesel on the surface, which drove the rear axle.

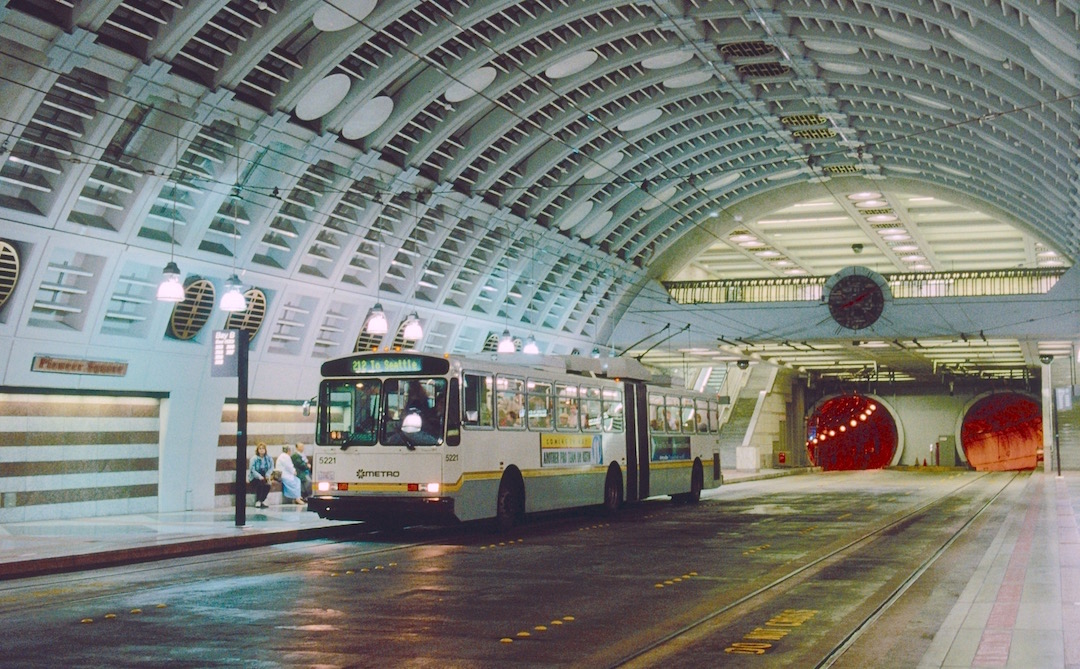
One of the 236 Breda dual-mode buses that operated as trolleybuses inside the Downtown Seattle Transit Tunnel from 1990 to 2005

The Municipality of Metropolitan Seattle was disbanded in 1994 after the public voted to merge it with the King County government. After the merger, Metro Transit became a division of King County's Department of Transportation.

In September 1997, King County Metro expanded the trolleybus system, electrifying route 70 between downtown and the University District via Eastlake Avenue E. The $19 million project, primarily funded by a grant from the Federal Transit Administration, was the first modern expansion of trolley wire (excluding the downtown bus tunnel) and incorporated public art as required by city ordinances.

Between 2001 and 2003, Metro purchased 100 Gillig Phantom coaches to replace the AM General trolleys. These coaches were delivered as "gliders," meaning that while they looked complete from the outside, internally the coach lacked a propulsion system. Metro removed the motors, propulsion controls and other components from the AM General trolleys, sent them to Alstom to be refurbished and then reinstalled them into the new Gillig bodies along with new fiberglass trolley poles from Vossloh Kiepe. The repurposing of the propulsion system from the AM General trolleybuses saved $200,000 per coach, totaling $20 million for the entire fleet.

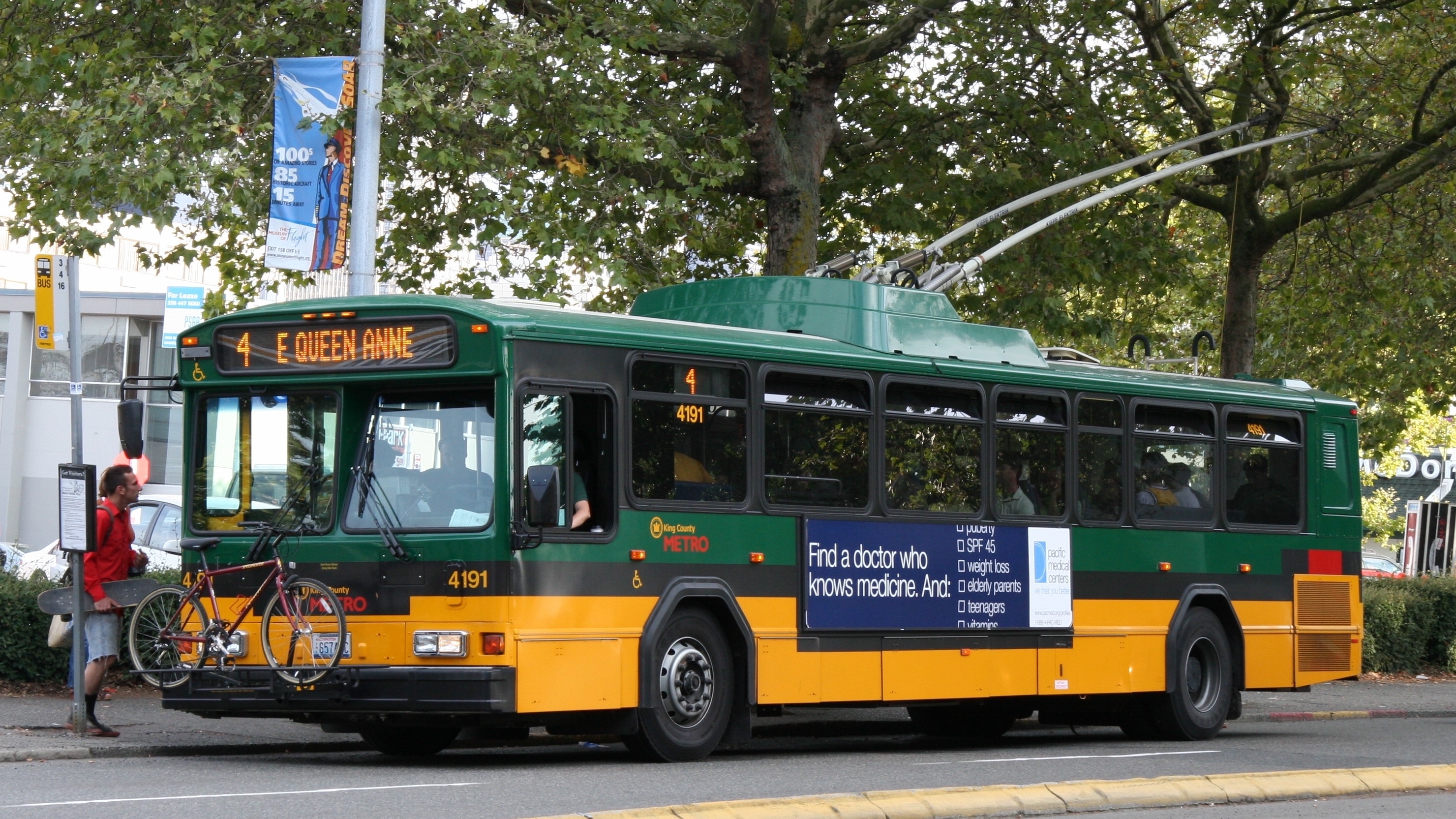
A Gillig Phantom trolleybus on route 4 in downtown, August 2005

After the Breda coaches used in the transit tunnel were replaced by hybrid electric buses, Metro converted 59 coaches into electric-only trolleybuses between 2004 and 2007 (following one trial conversion in 2002). As a part of the conversion, Metro removed the diesel motors from the coaches and installed new Vossloh-Kiepe current collection equipment, fiberglass trolley poles to replace the steel poles, new interior upholstery, a new driver's compartment, and new LED destination signs to replace the flip-dot signs and LED turn signals and tail lights to replace incandescent ones. These converted Breda coaches were renumbered 4200-4258 and replaced the aging MAN articulated trolleybuses.

The unique fleet of converted Breda coaches and Gillig coaches with recycled 1979 propulsion systems saved money for Metro in the early 2000s, but after a decade on the streets of Seattle the buses became less reliable and more expensive to maintain. By the end of the decade, Metro started to look at purchasing an all-new trolley fleet.

=== Recommitting to the trolleybus system ===
King County Metro's plan to replace the trolley fleet came into question as the nationwide economic downturn caused a steep and prolonged drop in the sales tax revenues that Metro used to fund its operations. As part of an effort to cut costs across the agency, a 2009 King County Auditor's Office report recommended replacing the trolleybuses with hybrid diesel-electric coaches. The audit concluded that electric trolley fleet costs $31.2 million a year to own and operate while the hybrids would cost $22.6 million per year, a savings of $8.7 million per year. The auditor acknowledged that the report did not consider the value of the overhead wire or social and environmental considerations, such as increased tailpipe emissions or increased noise.

Facing a situation similar to the 1970s and pressure from the public, King County Metro commissioned an independent evaluation of the trolleybus system. That 2011 evaluation disproved the audit's findings on the trolleybus system. The report found that the 2009 audit did not consider that a longer life-span could be expected for new trolleybuses (15 years) compared to hybrid diesel-electric buses (12 years) and did not take into account that the Federal Transit Administration provides fixed guideway funding for the overhead trolley wire. The report concluded that the annualized life-cycle cost for each trolleybus is $11.8 million per year, compared to $15.5 million per year for a hybrid diesel-electric coach, a savings of $3.7 million per year.

After the results of the evaluation, Metro placed an order in June 2013 with New Flyer for 141 Xcelsior trolleybuses to replace the Gillig and Breda trolleybuses. The Xcelsior XT40 and XT60 are the first trolleybuses in King County Metro's fleet to have a low-floor design, a wheelchair ramp (instead of a lift), air conditioning and an auxiliary power unit (that allow buses to operate off-wire for at least 3 miles). Metro says that the New Flyer buses use 25 to 30 percent less energy than the electric trolley buses they replaced, partly because of a regenerative braking system will allow coaches to capture the energy generated during braking and feed it back into the overhead wires. The Xcelsior trolleybuses have a distinct purple and yellow livery, that distinguish them from Metro's hybrid diesel-electric and diesel-powered buses.

The initial order was for 86 of the 40-foot coaches (model XT40) and 55 of the 60-foot, articulated coaches (model XT60). The order would have decreased the total number of trolleybuses in the fleet by 18 coaches since at the time the order was placed, Metro was planning to cut service (as a part of the cost-saving measures amid the economic downturn). Instead, the agency ended up expanding service after Seattle voters approved a transportation benefit district. As a result, the order was increased to 110 model XT40 buses and 64 model XT60 buses in early 2015.

Two prototype Xcelsior XT40 trolleybuses (Nos. 4300 and 4301) were delivered in October 2014 for evaluation and testing and the first Xcelsior XT40 coaches entered service on August 19, 2015, followed by the first Xcelsior XT60 on January 29, 2016.

After years of planning, King County Metro installed a new section of trolley wire near Seattle Pacific University in North Queen Anne and placed it into service in March 2017. Before this project, coaches used on routes 3 and 4 laid over in residential areas of Queen Anne. This new wire allowed routes 3 and 4 to join route 13 in serving Seattle Pacific University, providing more frequent service to the campus.

On March 23, 2020, King County Metro indefinitely suspended several bus routes in response to the COVID-19 pandemic. The only trolleybus route suspended completely was route 47. It never resumed operating as such, but service over its entire length was reinstated in September 2024 as a new branch of route 3 after a more than four-year suspension of service to the Summit neighborhood. With this change, route 3 no longer operates between downtown and Seattle Pacific University, but Metro added several new trips to that section of route 4 as partial compensation.

With the opening of the Northgate Link Light Rail extension on October 2, 2021, routes 43, 44, 49, and 70 were planned to be revised in the University District to serve the new U District station, but implementation of the route changes was postponed indefinitely (the changes being shown in updated schedules but with the four routes "rerouted" to continue following their old routings starting on the same day, October 2) because of delays in preparing a new bus-only lane on NE 43rd Street and installing overhead trolley wires along the new routing. The new loop, along NE 43rd Street and 12th Avenue NE, opened for service with buses on Saturday, June 25, 2022, and with trolleybuses on the Monday, June 27, 2022. The wire that had been used by route 70 on 15th Avenue NE north of NE 45th Street is disused, but Metro has proposed that it be used for route 48 when that route is electrified.

== Future expansion ==
In recent years, the Seattle Department of Transportation (SDOT) and King County Metro have presented proposals to expand trolleybus service throughout Seattle by building new wire.

The largest project currently underway is along 23rd Avenue through the Central District. As part of a project to improve the arterial, SDOT is adding new, stronger streetlight poles that will be capable of supporting the weight of trolley wire. The new poles will enable the electrification of route 48, which runs on 23rd Avenue through the Central District and has two segments without wires totaling 1.7 miles (2.7 km), the rest shared with other existing trolleybus routes. In 2019, after a delay to the project, Metro indicated that the remaining work to convert route 48 to trolleybuses was planned to take place in 2021 and 2022, for opening in May 2023, but new delays were encountered subsequently, and by 2025 the projected date for the conversion of route 48 to trolleybuses had been pushed back to 2032.

The Move Seattle ballot measure approved by voters in November 2015 includes a planned expansion of the RapidRide system. Four of the seven future RapidRide corridors are proposed to use electric trolleybus technology, utilizing the existing network of trolley wire and in some cases expanding it:

- RapidRide J Line (formerly Roosevelt RapidRide Line) (2026): U-District – South Lake Union – Downtown Seattle via Roosevelt Way/11th Avenue and Eastlake Avenue (utilizes wire currently used by route 70)
- RapidRide R Line (formerly Rainier RapidRide Line) (TBD): Downtown Seattle – Mount Baker – Rainier Valley via Jackson St & Rainier Ave (utilizes wire currently used by route 7)
- Market RapidRide Line (Cancelled): Ballard – Wallingford – U-District – Laurelhurst via Market St and 45th Ave (utilizes and expands wire currently used by route 44)
- 23rd RapidRide Line (Cancelled): Mount Baker – Central District – U-District via 23rd Ave & Rainier Ave (utilizes wire currently used by Route 7 and under construction for route 48)

Additionally, the G Line (Downtown Seattle – First Hill – Central District via Madison Street, opened in 2024) had long been planned to use trolleybuses, using already-existing wire currently used by route 12 plus some new sections of wire, but in March 2019 SDOT announced that hybrid buses would be used instead. The reason for the change was that Metro, who is tasked with acquiring the vehicles for the G Line, was unable to find any North American manufacturer willing to build articulated trolleybuses with doors on both sides – a G Line project requirement – that could handle the very steep grades on the westernmost portion of the line (18–19%).

SDOT also identified several possible future trolley wire expansions in its Transit Master Plan as of 2016, including two key projects: electrifying Denny Way between Uptown and Olive Way (which would allow a portion of busy route 8 to operate with trolleybuses) and electrifying Yesler between 2nd and 9th Avenues, and on 9th Avenue from Yesler to Jefferson to allow routes 3 and 4 to travel on a less-congested path between Downtown and Harborview Medical Center). However, the proposal to change the routing of routes 3 and 4 was dropped in 2018 in response to public opposition.

== Routes ==
As of March 2017, 15 trolleybus routes operate in Seattle. In the following table, routes are ordered by number, principal streets traveled on are italicized and major destinations and neighborhoods are listed.

Route No.	Off-Peak	Sat	Sun	North or West Terminal	Via	South or East Terminal	Continues as	Average Weekday Ridership (Fall 2023)
1	Yes	Yes	Yes	Kinnear (West Queen Anne)	Kinnear Park, Seattle Center West (Uptown), Belltown	Downtown Seattle	14	1,848
2	Yes	Yes	Yes	West Queen Anne	Queen Anne Ave N, Seattle Center West (Uptown), Belltown, Downtown Seattle, First Hill, E Union St, Central District, Madrona	Madrona Park	13 (Alternating trips from Madrona) (Note: Trips from Madrona to Downtown alternate between continuing as route 2 to West Queen Anne or route 13 to Seattle Pacific University.)	4,115
3	Yes	Yes	Yes	Summit (Capitol Hill)	Bellevue Avenue, Pine Street, Downtown Seattle, First Hill, Harborview Medical Center, E Jefferson Ave, Swedish Hospital Cherry Hill, Central District	Madrona		4,311 (Note: Ridership figure does not reflect extension to Summit.)
4	Yes	Yes	Yes	Seattle Pacific University (North Queen Anne)	5 Ave N, East Queen Anne, Seattle Center East (Uptown), Belltown, Downtown Seattle, First Hill, Harborview Medical Center, E Jefferson Ave, Swedish Hospital Cherry Hill, Central District	Judkins Park		2,487
7	Yes	Yes	Yes	Downtown Seattle	S Jackson St, International District, Rainier Ave S, Mount Baker Transit Center, Rainier Valley, Columbia City	Rainier Beach		9,928
10	Yes	Yes	Yes	Downtown Seattle	Summit, Capitol Hill station, Kaiser Permanente Capitol Hill Medical Center, 15th Ave E	Capitol Hill		1,790
12	Yes	Yes	Yes	Downtown Seattle	First Hill, Swedish Medical Center, Seattle University, 19th Ave E, Kaiser Permanente Capitol Hill Medical Center	Interlaken Park (Capitol Hill)		1,516
13	Yes	Yes	Yes	Seattle Pacific University (North Queen Anne)	Queen Anne Ave N, Seattle Center West (Uptown), Belltown	Downtown Seattle	2 (Downtown-Madrona)	1,490
14	Yes	Yes	Yes	Downtown Seattle	S Jackson St, International District, Central District, 31 Ave S, Mount Baker Transit Center	Mount Baker	1	2,521
36	Yes	Yes	Yes	Downtown Seattle	S Jackson St, Pacific Medical Center, Beacon Hill, Beacon Ave S, Jefferson Park, VA Hospital	Othello Station		6,583
43	Limited (Note: Service between University District and Downtown operates only during weekday peak hours, in the typical commuting direction. Limited off-peak and weekend service between University District and Capitol Hill is operated as coaches travel between route 44 and Atlantic Base.)	Limited	Limited	Downtown Seattle	Capitol Hill, Capitol Hill Station, Kaiser Permanente Capitol Hill Medical Center, Central District, Montlake, University of Washington Station, University of Washington Campus	U District Station	44 (certain trips)	380
44	Yes	Yes	Yes	Ballard (Chittenden Locks)	NW Market St, West Woodland, N 45th St, Wallingford, U District Station, University of Washington Campus	University of Washington Station	43 (certain trips) (Note: Coaches operate as route 43 between University District and Capitol Hill as they travel between route 44 and Atlantic Base.)	5,799
49	Yes	Yes	Yes	U District Station	10th Ave E, Capitol Hill, Broadway, Seattle Central Community College	Downtown Seattle		2,824
70	Yes	Yes	Yes	U District Station	Eastlake Ave E, Eastlake, Fairview Ave N, South Lake Union	Downtown Seattle		4,429

"Night Owl" service operates on routes 3, 7, 36, 44, and 49.

== Steep grades ==
The system serves many hilly areas and features some very steep grades. The steepest grade on the system is 19 percent in the block of Madison Street between 3rd and 4th Avenues in downtown, where traffic runs in the downhill direction only. The second-steepest blocks, and the steepest sections with two-way traffic, are the block of Queen Anne Avenue between Prospect Street and Highland Drive (in the Lower Queen Anne neighborhood) and the block of James Street between 4th and 5th Avenues downtown, with grades of 18.5 percent and 18.3 percent, respectively.

== Fleet ==
=== Current ===
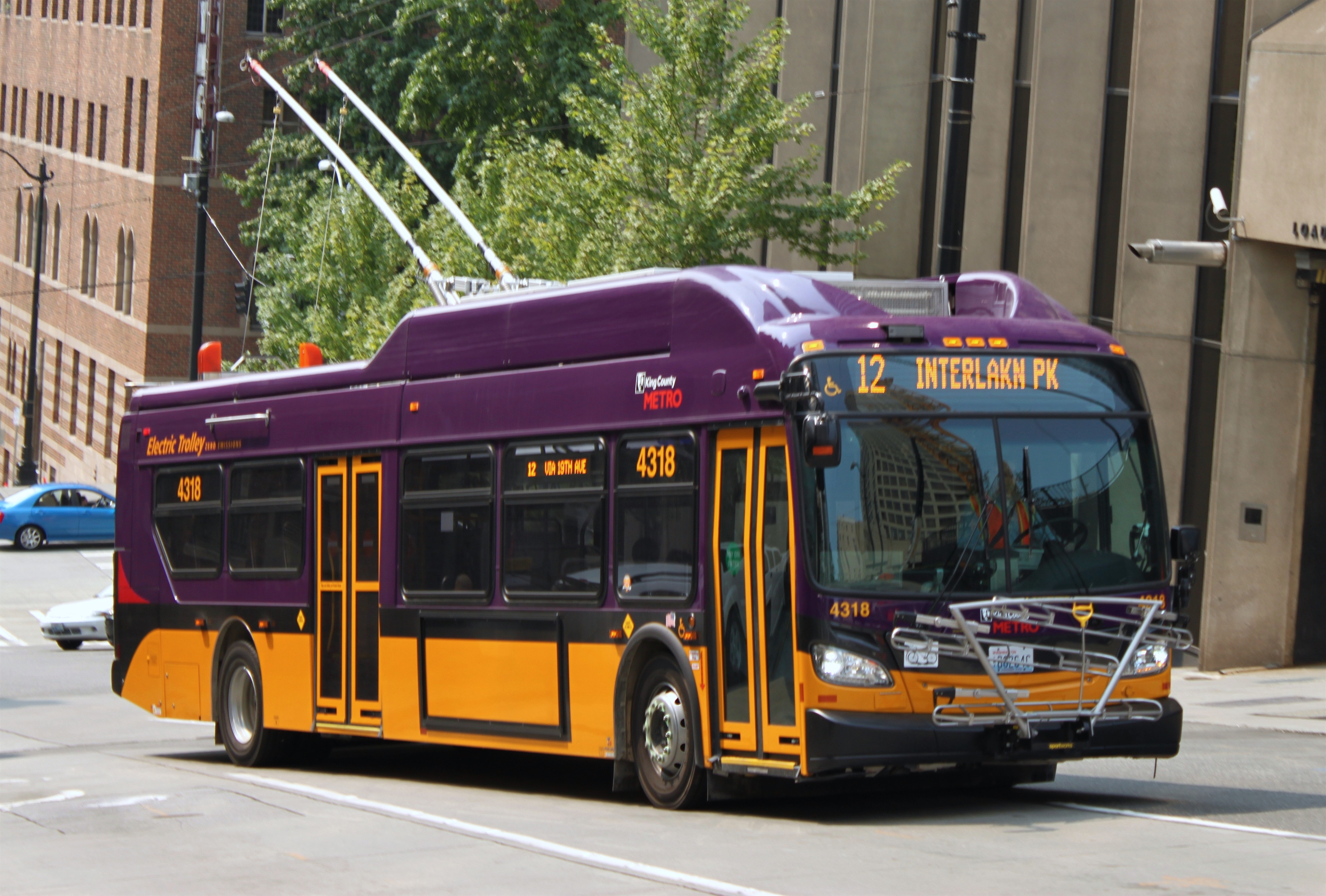
XT40 trolleybus in downtown, on route 12

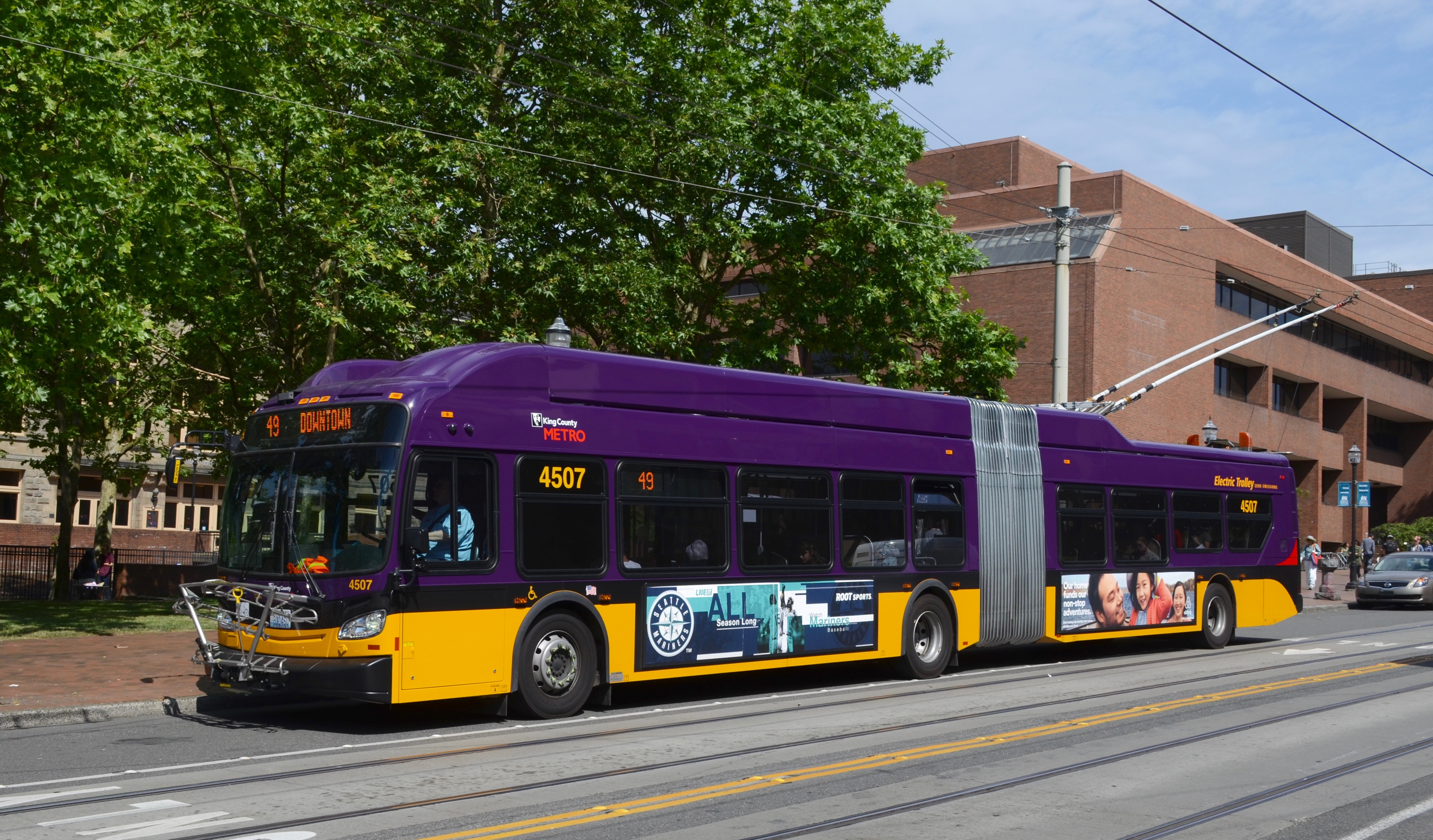
XT60 articulated trolleybus on Broadway, on route 49

The Metro trolleybus fleet presently comprises two types, 40-foot (12 m) and 60-foot (18 m) articulated buses. These buses accrue a total of 3.7 million miles each year (62.8% on 40-foot buses, 37.2% on 60-foot buses) and are the cleanest and quietest buses in Metro's fleet.

Metro's current trolleybuses are New Flyer Xcelsior coaches that were delivered beginning in 2015. These 174 coaches have a low-floor design, a wheelchair ramp (instead of a lift) and air conditioning. The new trolleybuses are built with motors from Škoda and a Vossloh Kiepe electric drive system, including an auxiliary power unit (lithium ion phosphate batteries) that allow buses to operate off-wire for at least 3 miles, a first for Metro.

Manufacturer	Model	Length	Propulsion	Year built	Fleet numbers (Qty.)
New Flyer	Xcelsior XT40	40 ft	Vossloh Kiepe (drive system); Škoda (motor)	2014–2016	4300–4409 (110)
New Flyer	Xcelsior XT60	60 ft	Vossloh Kiepe (drive system); Škoda (motor)	2015–2016	4500–4563 (64)

=== Former ===
==== 1940–1978 ====
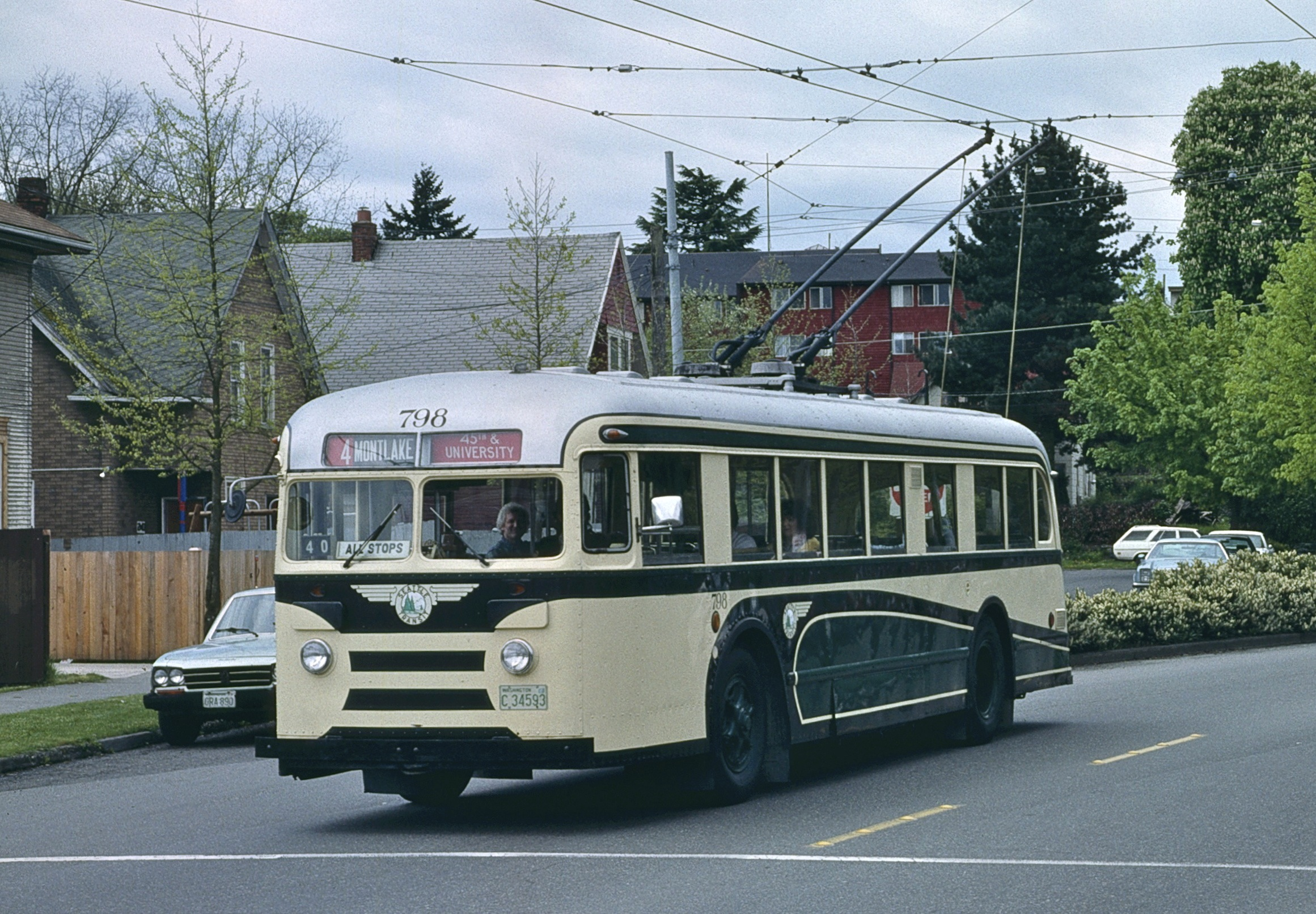
Preserved PCF-Brill No. 798, built in 1940, wearing the system's first paint scheme

For the opening of the system in 1940, the Seattle Transit System purchased trolleybuses from two different manufacturers. The Twin Coach Company provided 135 vehicles, while the J. G. Brill Company provided 100. All but the first Brill vehicles were built, under license, by Pacific Car and Foundry (PCF), in the nearby city of Renton, and are commonly referred to as PCF-Brill vehicles or simply Brills. Strong ridership growth during World War II, when the city's economy was booming, brought a need for additional vehicles. Forty-two more Twin Coach trolleybuses were bought in 1942–1943, followed by 30 Pullman-Standard vehicles in 1944. These were the last new trolleybuses acquired until the late 1970s. The fleet's size peaked at that time, at 307, making Seattle's trolleybus fleet the 12th-largest in the United States.

With the abandonment of several trolleybus routes in 1963, the remaining Brill trolleybuses were retired. The system was reduced to only about half its former size. Additional route closures in 1965 (route 11-East Madison) and 1970 (routes 3-North Queen Anne–Jefferson Park and 4-East Queen Anne–Montlake) reduced the active fleet to only 53 coaches by 1971. In 1974, when a few Twin Coaches returned to service, the entire remaining fleet of 57 was renumbered into the series 600–656, comprising 34 of the 1940 Twins (600–633), eight of the slightly larger 1943 Twins (634–641) and all 15 of the 1944 Pullmans (642–656). Not long afterward, a shortage of serviceable vehicles prompted Metro Transit to re-acquire four trolleybuses that previously had been donated to museums. These included two Twins, one Pullman and, most notably, a PCF-Brill—a type of trolleybus that had not been in the fleet in more than a decade. Brill #798 returned from the by-then-defunct Trolleyland Museum (Centralia, Washington) in April 1975. Metro immediately repainted it into its original Seattle Transit System paint scheme only used during the 1940s, and it returned to regular service in November 1975. In 1978, Brill 798 was officially designated a Seattle Landmark by the city's Landmarks Preservation Board.

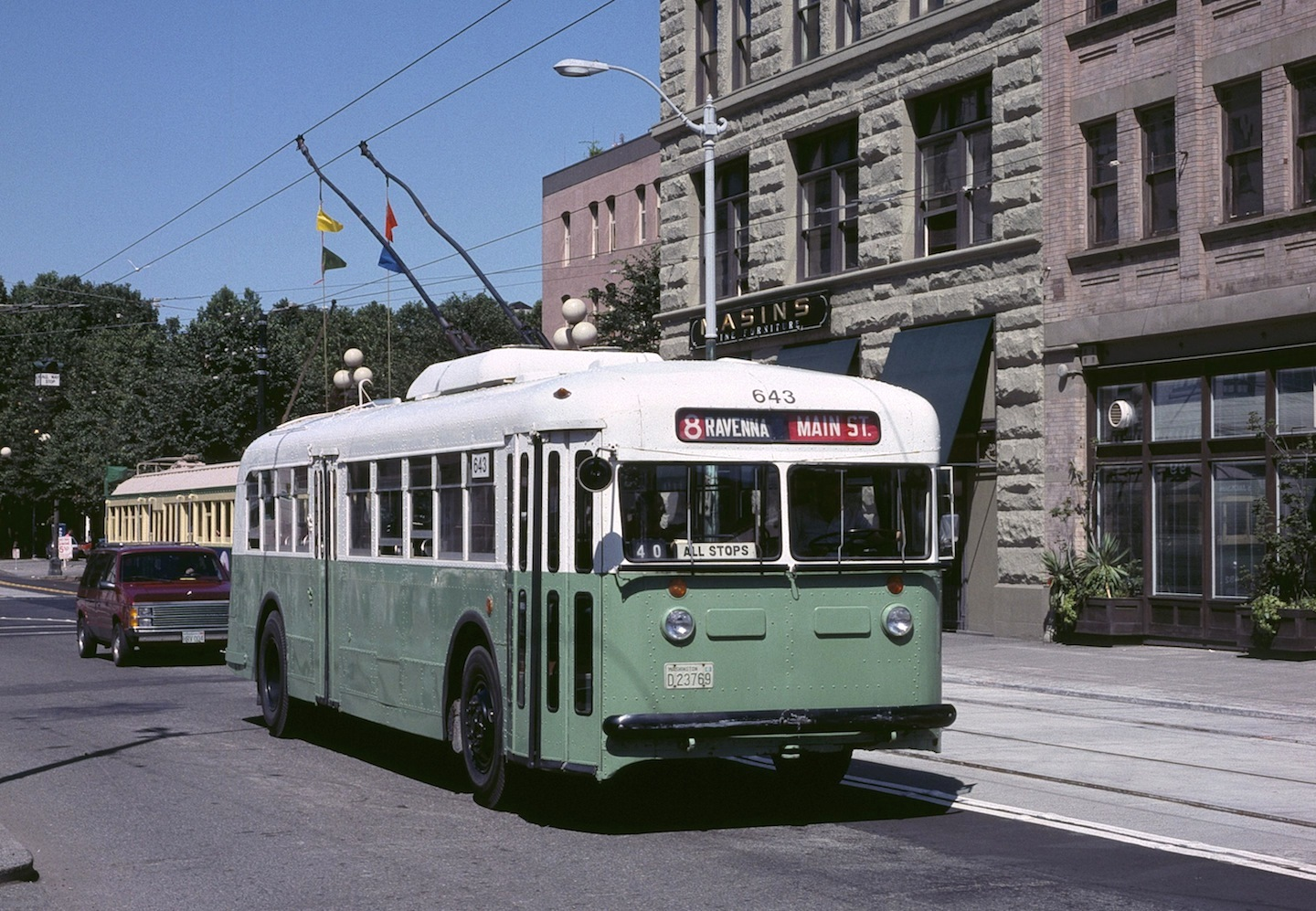
1940 Twin Coach No. 643, retired in 1978, was restored by MEHVA in the late 1980s and wears the Seattle Transit System's 1955–1968 livery. It was renumbered 905 in 2018.

Metro's decision in 1974 to rebuild and expand the entire trolleybus system included the replacement of the entire trolleybus fleet. All remaining 59 vehicles from the 1940s fleet were permanently retired when the system shut down for rebuilding at the end of the service day on January 20, 1978. Most were kept in storage until late 1981, when 55 were declared surplus and designated for auction or donation to museums. Following the formation of the Metro Employees Historic Vehicle Association in that year, Metro agreed to preserve examples of all four types – including the single Brill, #798 – for eventual restoration and operation by MEHVA. The preserved vehicles were No. 798, the 1940 PCF-Brill; No. 622 (originally No. 905, and given an earlier number, 643, after restoration), a 1940 Twin Coach 41GWFT; No. 636, a 1943 Twin Coach 44GTT; and No. 655 (restored to its original number, 1005, after restoration), a 1944 Pullman-Standard. To this day, each of the coaches remain in Metro's historic fleet. No. 643's original number, 905, was restored in 2018.

==== 1979–1999 ====
For the reopening of the rebuilt and expanded system in 1979–1981, Metro purchased 109 40-foot-long (12 m) trolleybuses from AM General. They were the system's first wheelchair lift-equipped trolleybuses. The vehicles were delivered in 1979 and first entered service with the reopening of the first two routes (2 and 10), on September 15, 1979. The last units entered service with the opening of the last two routes (7 and 43), on May 23, 1981.

With electrification of motor bus routes 15 and 18 planned, in 1984 Metro placed an order with MAN, of Germany, for 46 articulated (bending) trolleybuses. Although Metro's fleet already included about 350 articulated diesel buses from the same manufacturer, these were its first articulated trolleybuses. Moreover, they were the first such vehicles in North America. A prototype was delivered in January 1986, and the remaining 45 followed in 1987. They began to enter service in April 1987. The planned conversion of routes 15 and 18 to trolleybuses was later deferred, as funds needed to be diverted to the downtown tunnel project, and was ultimately canceled. The arrival of the new articulated trolleybuses instead led to some AM General trolleybuses being placed into storage. All 46 MAN trolleybuses were taken out of service in November 1987 because of a braking problem, and remained out of service for a full year while Metro worked on solving the problem. They began to return to service in November 1988.

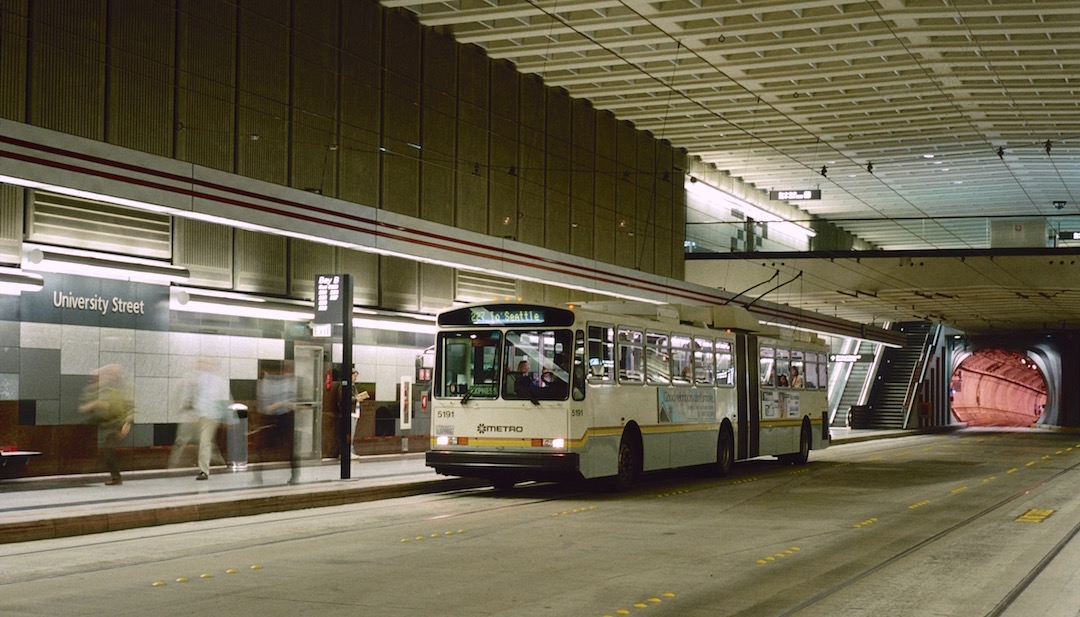
A Breda dual-mode bus operating as a trolleybus in the Downtown Seattle Transit Tunnel in 1994

For the Downtown Seattle Transit Tunnel (DSTT) project, the City Council and Metro chose a plan that would use articulated, dual-mode buses that would run as trolleybuses in the tunnel and as diesel buses outside the tunnel. Metro borrowed a prototype Renault articulated, dual-mode bus from its French manufacturer in 1982–1983 to evaluate the technology and gain experience with it. The vehicle was operated in regular service on every trolleybus route and several motorbus routes, between November 1982 and the end of 1983. Metro ultimately awarded a contract for an order of 236 dual-mode buses to Breda Costruzioni Ferroviarie in October 1986, at a cost of $133 million, subsequently approved by the federal government's UMTA in November. Metro did not intend to use these vehicles on any of its surface trolleybus routes, only on the planned "tunnel routes", which were effectively diesel-bus routes and only used trolley propulsion inside the 1.3-mile (2.1 km) transit tunnel. However, almost two decades later, some of the Breda vehicles were converted to electric-only and used on the surface trolleybus routes.

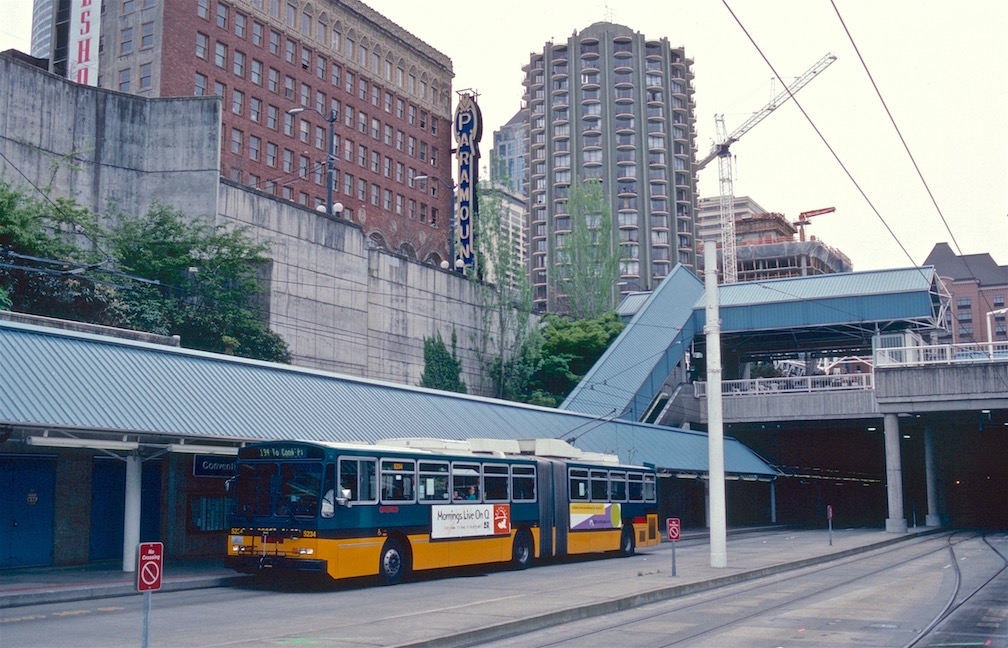
A Breda dual-mode bus at the DSTT's Convention Place station, after repainting in a new paint scheme Metro adopted in 1995

The first of four prototype Breda dual-mode buses was delivered in November 1988. For the 232 production-series vehicles, Breda shipped the bodies from Italy to the Seattle area and then completed their assembly and fitting-out at space it leased in the Seattle suburb of Issaquah. That was done to comply with the Buy America Act, requiring that at least half the value of foreign-built transit vehicles be U.S. content. Prototypes 5000–5002 (No. 5003 was kept in Italy) temporarily entered service on regular Metro routes in January 1990 – initially diesel routes, but on trolleybus route 43 a month later – to enable Metro to accrue experience with them prior to the opening of the DSTT. The first production-series vehicle was accepted in March 1990. By the opening of the DSTT, on September 15, 1990, 55 Breda dual-mode buses had been accepted for service, and all Bredas were used exclusively on "tunnel routes" from then on. The entire trolleybus fleet was fitted with bicycle racks on the front in 1994.

==== 2000–2016 ====
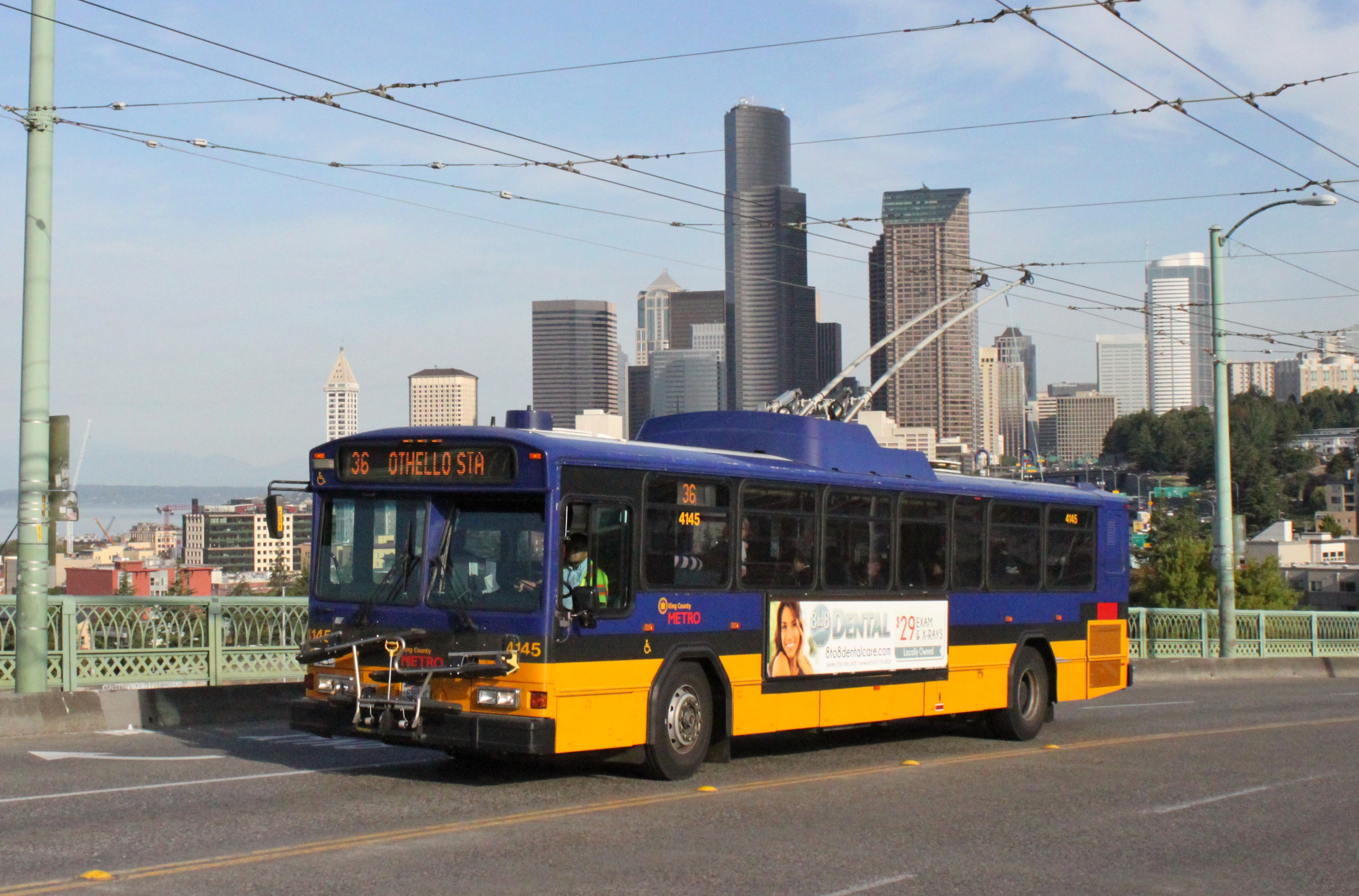
A Gillig Phantom trolleybus on the Jose Rizal Bridge in 2015

The next major change to the trolleybus fleet occurred in the early 2000s, as the AM Generals and MANs would both be due for replacement around that time. In 2001–2003, Metro acquired 100 new 40-foot-long (12 m) Gillig Phantom trolleys, to replace its 109 AM General trolleys. The drive train of the AM General coaches was placed into the new Gillig bodies along with new electronics from Alstom, saving approximately $200,000 per coach. But as the trolleybuses aged, Metro said the 1979 propulsion systems had become less reliable and more expensive to maintain. Installation of the part-new, part-overhauled propulsion equipment was carried out by Metro's own maintenance employees. The first two Gillig trolleybuses, not yet equipped with propulsion, arrived in June and August 2001. The first propulsion set arrived on August 23, and Metro began installing it immediately. These two vehicles, Nos. 4100–4101, later became the first Gilligs to enter service, on January 22, 2002. The 98 production-series vehicles were delivered between 2001 and early 2003. The last day of service for any AM General trolleybuses was March 27, 2003, and the last Gillig entered service on April 15, 2003.

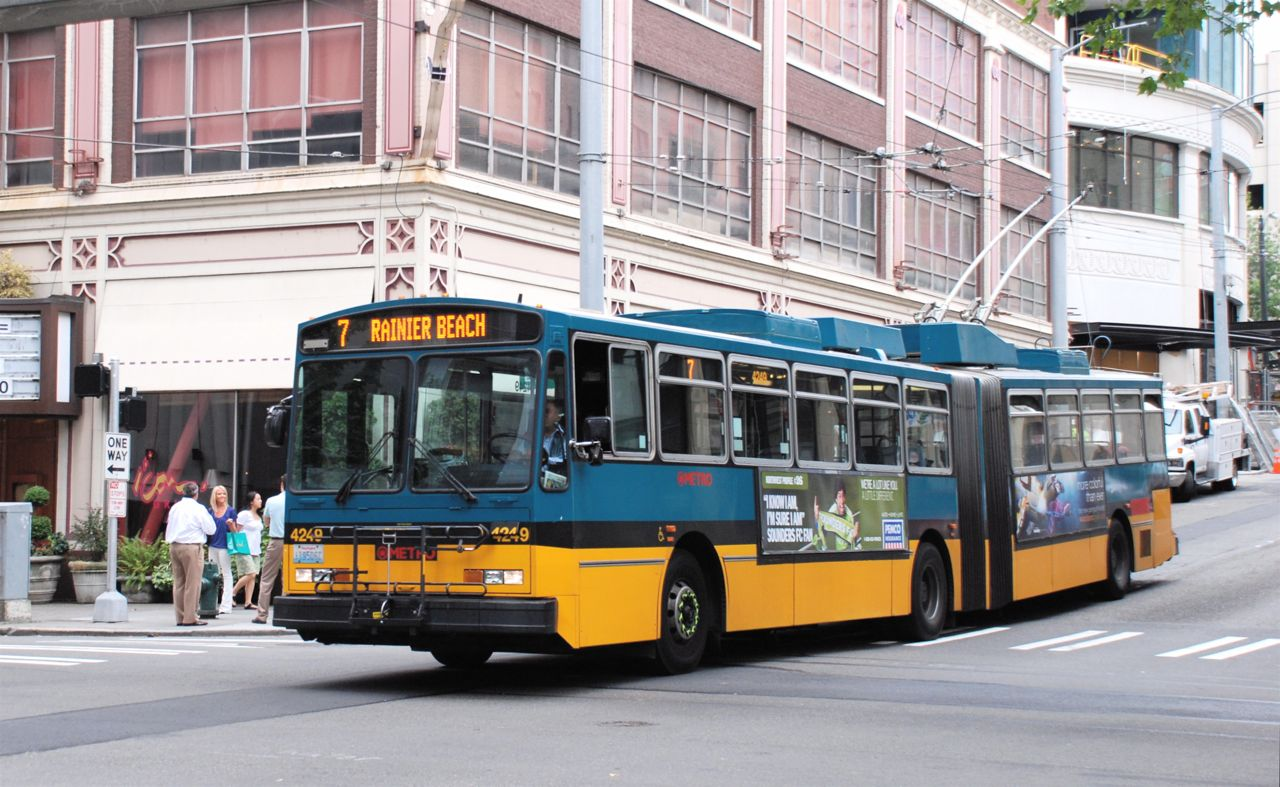
One of the Bredas after conversion from dual-mode bus to trolleybus

To replace the MAN articulated trolleybuses, Metro converted 59 of the 236 Breda dual-mode buses to trolley-only propulsion in 2004–2007, renumbered 4200–4258 and began using them for regular service on surface trolleybus routes for the first time. In the downtown tunnel, new hybrid electric buses had started to replace the dual-mode buses in June 2004, and the last use of a dual-mode bus in the tunnel occurred on January 24, 2005, on which date only a single dual-mode bus was in service (#5169 on routes 71/72/73). Before deciding to proceed with this conversion program, Metro made a trial conversion. Between fall 2001 and early 2002, dual-mode bus 5101 was converted to electric-only, and it entered service on the surface trolleybus system in February 2002. Later, when Metro decided to proceed with a conversion program of several vehicles, it adopted a planned fleet-number series of 4200–4258, and No. 5101 was renumbered 4200 in 2004. The retirement of the MAN trolleys began in 2004, and the last day of service for the type was July 25, 2007.

The mid-2000s transition left the trolleybus fleet with 100 standard 40-foot Gillig vehicles and 59 articulated Breda vehicles. Those vehicles were predicted to reach the end of their cost-effective service lives around 2012–2014, and in 2009 Metro proposed abandoning the trolleybus system when the last Gillig and Breda trolleybuses were retired. However, additional studies and strong public opposition to the proposal ultimately resulted in Metro's decision to purchase another fleet of new trolleybuses to replace the old vehicles. In June 2013, Metro placed an order with New Flyer for 141 Xcelsior trolleybuses. Eighty-six were to be 40-foot vehicles (model XT40) and 55 were to be 60-foot, articulated vehicles (model XT60). Because of the expansion of service made possible by Seattle's new transportation benefit district, in early 2015 the order was increased to 110 model XT40 buses and 64 model XT60 buses. The Xcelsior trolleys are the first low-floor trolleys in Metro's fleet and the first to be air-conditioned. Two prototype buses, XT40 Nos. 4300 and 4301, were delivered in October 2014 for evaluation and testing. Delivery of the production-series vehicles began in 2015, starting with the 40-foot units, the first of which entered service in August 2015. The prototype XT60 articulated unit was received by Metro on June 1, 2015, and the production-series vehicles began arriving in December 2015, with the first day of service for the type being January 29, 2016. The New Flyer trolleybuses gradually replaced the older vehicles in 2015 and 2016. The last day of service for Breda trolleybuses was October 27, 2016, after more than 26 years of use (the first 15 as dual-mode buses). The last day of service for any Gillig trolleybuses was November 29, 2016.

Original fleet numbers	Orig. qty.	Manufacturer	Electrical equipment	Model	Year built	Configuration	Notes	Image
700–799	100	PCF-Brill	GE	40SMT	1940	Standard (two-axle)	Built by Pacific Car and Foundry, under license from Brill (No. 700 built entirely by Brill). Last units retired in 1963.	
800–934	135	Twin Coach	Westinghouse	41GWFT	1940	Standard	Last units retired in January 1978. Renumbered three times during their service lives, due mostly to fleet number consolidation after retirements of several vehicles. Final number series was 600–633.	
935–943	9	Twin Coach	GE	41GWFT	1942–43	Standard	Retired in 1966.	
944–952	9	Twin Coach	Westinghouse	41GWFT	1942–43	Standard	Retired in 1971.	
953–976	24	Twin Coach	Westinghouse	44GTT	1943	Standard	Last units retired in January 1978. Renumbered three times during their service lives. Final number series was 634–641.	
977–1006	30	Pullman-Standard	GE	41CA-100-44CX	1943–44	Standard	Last units retired in January 1978. The 15 units surviving in 1974 (all 1944-built) were renumbered 642–656.	
900–910, 912–1009	109	AM General	Randtronics/GE	10240T	1979	Standard	The first wheelchair lift-equipped Seattle trolleybuses. Last units retired in 2003.	
1050	1	Renault		PER180	1981/82	Articulated, dual-mode	Temporary member of fleet, on loan from manufacturer for 1½ years in 1982–83.	
4000–4045	46	M.A.N.	Siemens	MAN SG-T310	1986–87	Articulated	Prototype 4000 built in 1985, delivered January 1986. Last units retired in 2007.	
5000–5235	236	Breda	AEG/Westinghouse (and Detroit Diesel 6V92TA diesel engines)	ADPB350	1988–91	Articulated, dual-mode	Prototypes 5000–5003 built in 1988; remainder in 1990–91. Used exclusively on routes serving the Downtown Seattle Transit Tunnel until 2005, not on the surface trolleybus system. Fifty-nine converted between 2004 and 2007 to electric-only propulsion and renumbered 4200–4258, for use on surface trolleybus routes. (The prototype such conversion, of No. 5101, took place in 2001–02; it kept that fleet number initially, but was later renumbered 4200.) Last units retired in 2016.	
4100–4199	100	Gillig	GE/Alstom	Phantom-ETB	2001–02	Standard	Reused some propulsion equipment from the AM General trolleybuses, along with some new components. Last units retired in 2016.	

==== Preserved ====
The Metro Employees Historic Vehicle Association (MEHVA) has preserved and restored several vintage trolleybuses from the system's past fleet. These include No. 798, a 1940 PCF-Brill; No. 643 (originally No. 905), a 1940 Twin Coach 41GWFT; No. 1005, a 1944 Pullman-Standard; No. 1008, a 1979 AM General; No. 5034, a 1990 Breda dual-mode bus; and, No. 4195, a 2002 Gillig. Also preserved by MEHVA, but not restored, is No. 636, a 1943 Twin Coach 44GTT (a different model than No. 643).

MEHVA did not preserve one of Metro's MAN articulated trolleybuses, but one of those vehicles – No. 4020 – joined the collection of the Illinois Railway Museum (IRM), near Chicago, and is able to operate under the museum's trolleybus wire. IRM has also preserved two other Seattle trolleybuses, No. 633, a 1940 Twin Coach and No. 4123, a 2002 Gillig. No. 604, a 1940 Twin Coach 41GWFT, has been preserved at the Oregon Electric Railway Museum (OERM), but since the facility does not have trolleybus wire, it is not able to operate there. Earlier, No. 648, a 1944 Pullman-Standard, was also preserved at OERM, but it was scrapped in 2018 because of its very poor condition.

== Operations ==
=== Garages ===
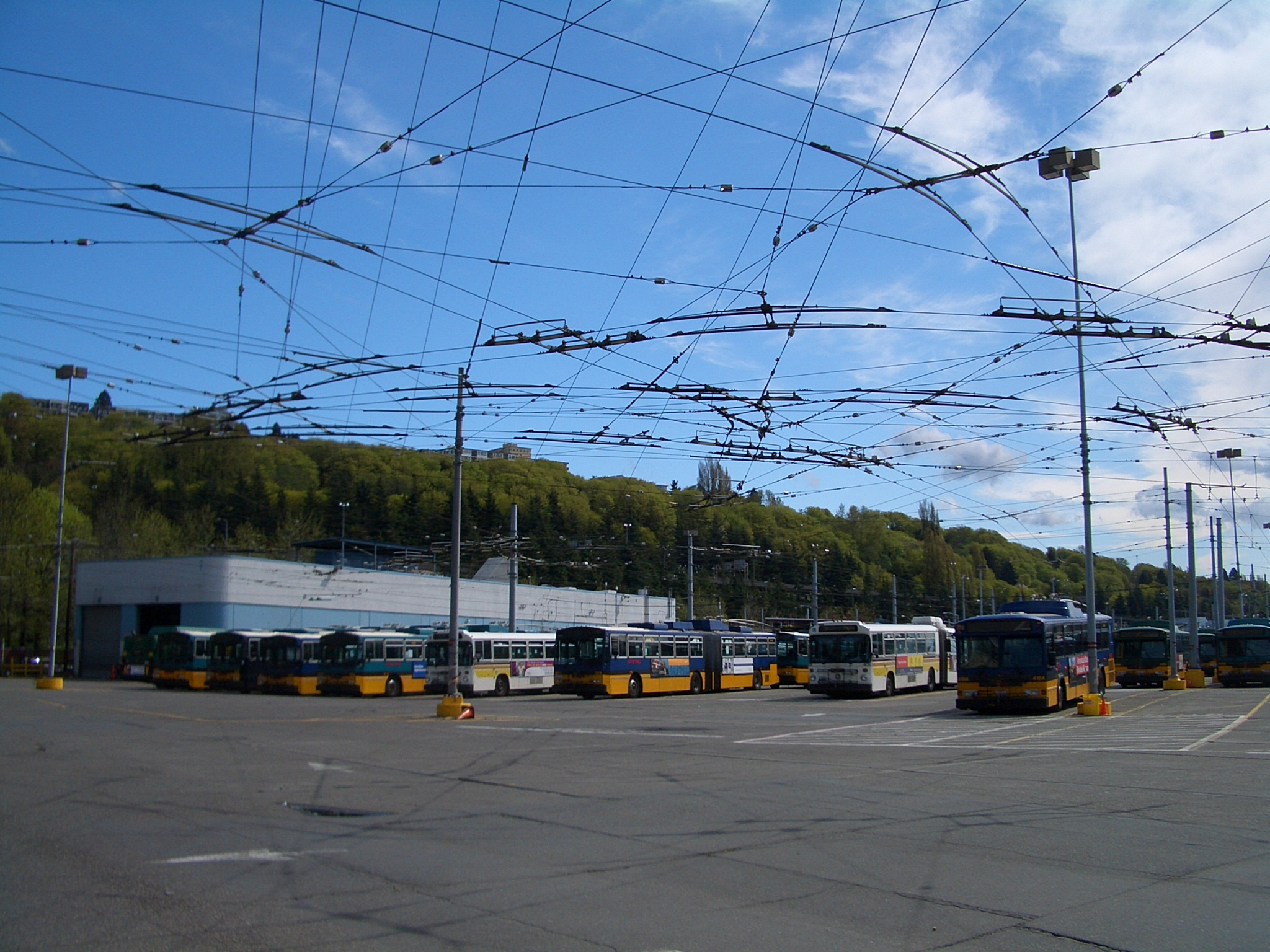
Trolleybuses parked at Atlantic Base, 2007

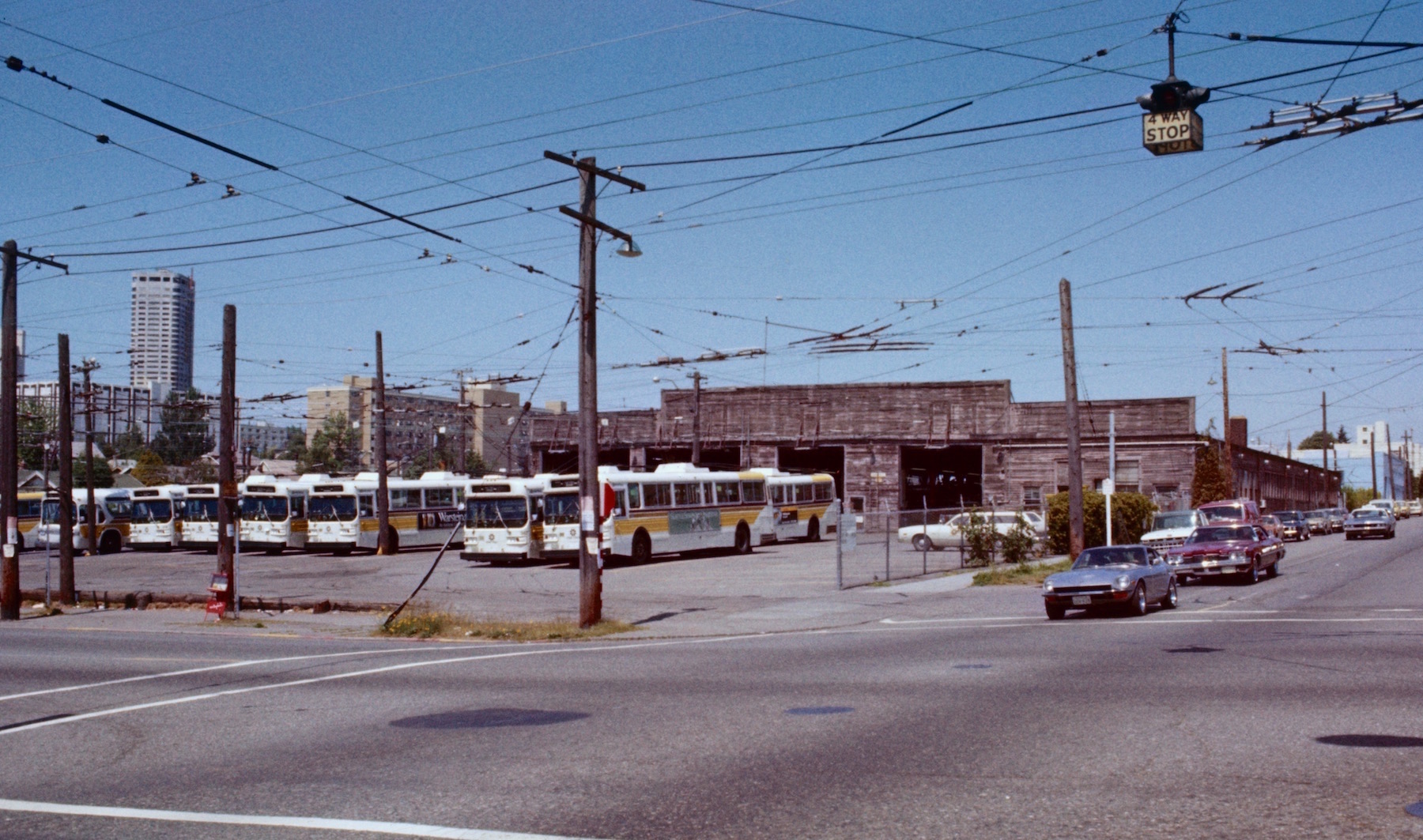
The former Jefferson Base two days before its closure, in 1982

Seattle's trolleybus fleet is operated out of Atlantic Base in SoDo, one of seven bus garages (known locally as bases) owned by the agency. Atlantic Base was completed in early 1941 and was built specifically to house and maintain trolleybuses.

The system originally had two garages, called "stations" by Seattle Transit. Jefferson Station, a former streetcar barn built in 1910 or 1907 and located in Seattle's Central District, opened for trolleybuses in 1940. Atlantic Station, at the same location as today's Atlantic Base, opened in 1941. Following service reductions in 1963 and 1970, Jefferson Station was closed in July 1970, except for use by overhead line maintenance crews and for vehicle storage. After the formation of Metro Transit, all trolleybuses were operated out of Atlantic Base until 1974, when they moved to Jefferson Base.

When the system reopened in 1979 after its almost-two-years shutdown for rebuilding, Jefferson Base remained Metro's sole trolleybus garage, but a move back to Atlantic was planned. In 1981–1982, the old maintenance building and wash building at Atlantic Base, which by this time had been renamed Central Base, were replaced by new buildings, and the entire facility was reequipped with overhead trolley wires, in preparation for its reactivation for trolleybuses. On June 5, 1982, it replaced Jefferson Base as the sole trolleybus garage. Jefferson Base was then decommissioned, and eventually it was razed to make way for athletic fields for nearby Seattle University. Central Base's name was later changed back to Atlantic.

=== Trolley motorization ===
Safety or routing issues sometimes require Metro to "motorize" the trolleybus routes, operating them with diesel or hybrid diesel-electric buses. These substitutions usually occur on weekends and are usually caused by maintenance on the overhead wires, construction projects near the overhead wires, or special events (such as parades or marathons) that require the routes to be detoured.

== See also ==
- List of trolleybus systems in the United States
