= Black Panther Park =

Park in Skyway, King County, Washington, U.S.

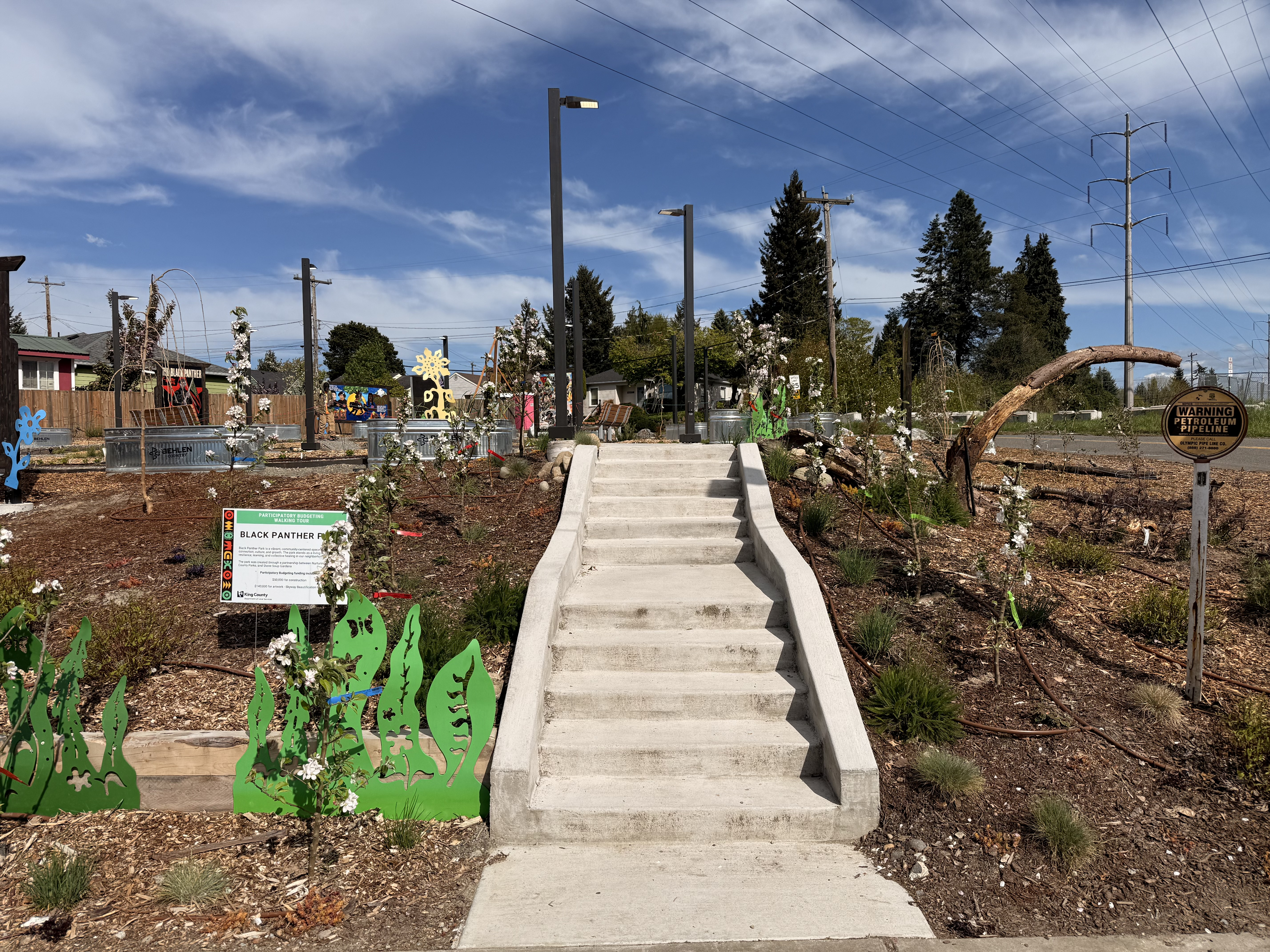
- The entrance to Black Panther Park
- Interactive map of Black Panther Park
- Location: Skyway, Washington, U.S.
- Coordinates: 47.4929°N 122.2402°W

Black Panther Park is a park in King County, Washington, United States. It is located at the intersection of 75th Avenue South and Renton Avenue South in Skyway near Seattle. The park was dedicated in March 2026 and is named for a local chapter of the Black Panther Party. The project was led by King County Parks and also received funding from King County's Department of Local Services.

== See also ==
- Seattle Black Panther Party History and Memory Project
- The People's Wall
