= The People's Wall =

Mural in Seattle, Washington, U.S.

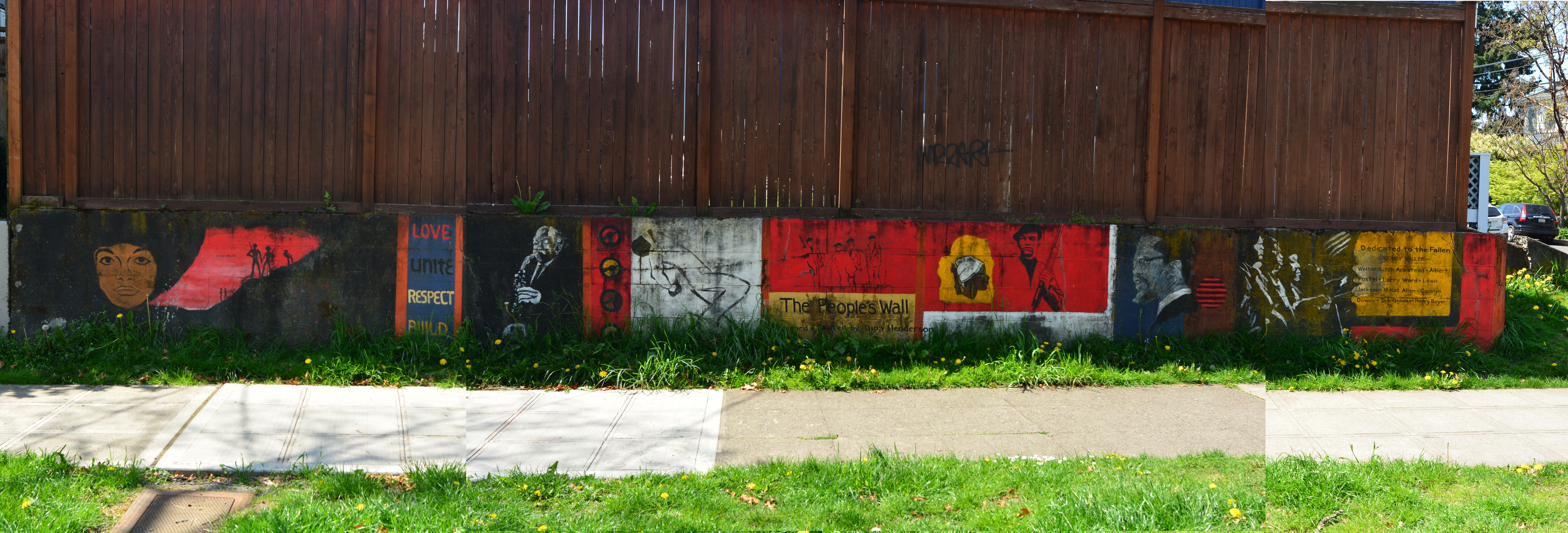
- The mural in 2023
- Artist: Dion Henderson
- Year: 1970
- Location: Seattle, Washington, U.S.; 47°36′12.2″N 122°18′23.4″W

The People's Wall on 20th Avenue just south of Spruce Street in the Central District / Squire Park neighborhood of Seattle, Washington, U.S., is a mural that was commissioned in 1969 by the Seattle chapter of the Black Panther Party (BPP) and painted in 1970 by artist Dion Henderson.

== Description and history ==
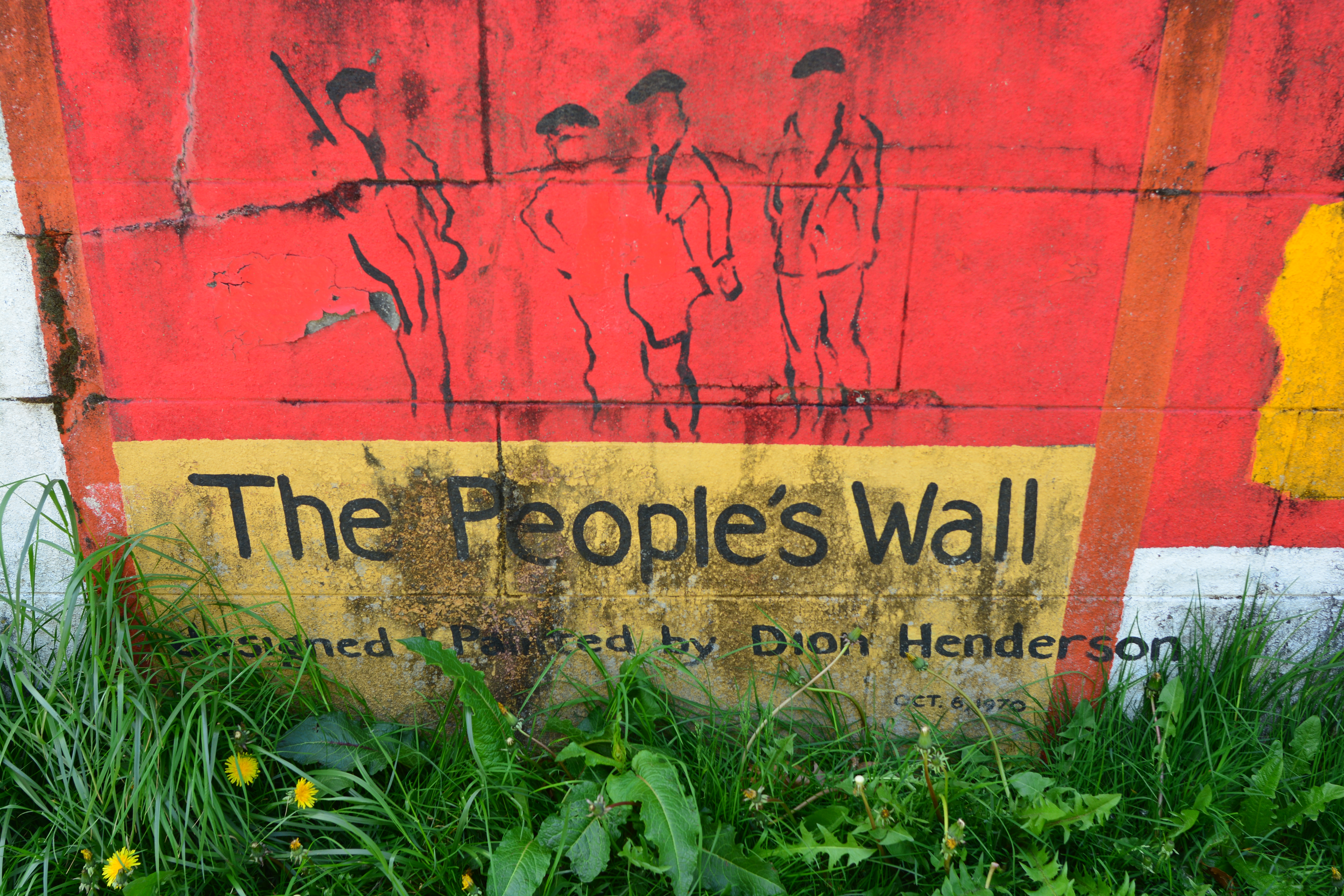
Part of the mural, 2023

Artist Dion Henderson (July 8, 1941 - October 23, 2010) was originally from Detroit, graduated from high school in Inkster, Michigan in 1959, then served seven-and-a-half years in the U.S. Army, including service in the Vietnam War. After leaving the service, he settled in Seattle with a wife and two children. He studied and taught art at the Burley School of Professional Art and the Seattle Art Institute, and taught art and several related subjects at Seattle's Garfield High School. Active in the Black Student Union at the University of Washington, he approached Aaron Dixon of the Seattle Black Panthers about painting this mural. In 1980, he moved to Washington, D.C., where he served for 23 years as an investigative consultant to the District government.

The mural stood on the east side of what was then the BPP chapter headquarters in Seattle, the second building to serve that purpose (which it served from 1969 to either 1971 or 1972). The building was torn down very shortly thereafter, but as of 2023 the retaining wall and mural remain. The mural was retouched in 2008 by Seattle artist Eddie Walker (died December 4, 2023) who had been one of the founders of the Black Student Union at the University of Washington.

The wall is dedicated to nine fallen Panthers: Sydney Miller, Welton Butch Armstead, Albert Postel, Larry War, Lewis Jackson, Maud Allen, Carolyn Downs, Jim Graves and Henry Boyer.

Eddie Walker, who retouched the wall in 2008, was a key figure in founding the Ethnic Cultural Center at the University of Washington, Seattle, and painted the portraits of Frederick Douglass and Sojourner Truth that hang in Seattle's Douglass-Truth Library.

== See also ==
- Black Panther Park
- Seattle Black Panther Party History and Memory Project
