= DeCharlene Williams =

African-American business owner (1943–2018)

DeCharlene Williams (January 13, 1943—May 20, 2018) was an African-American business owner, community leader, activist, author, and political candidate in Seattle. She is the founder of the Central Area Chamber of Commerce, a group that focused on the common challenges facing Black business owners in the late twentieth century. She ran for Mayor of Seattle in 1993 and a Seattle City Council seat in 1997.

== Personal life ==
Williams was born in Temple, Texas and her family moved to Portland, Oregon in 1945 where she was raised. She graduated from high school and got married at age 15 to Robert "Bobby" Williams, and the couple moved to Seattle. The couple divorced in 1965 when Williams was 22 years old.

Williams was a member of the South Side Church of Christ in Skyway, Washington. She was an enthusiastic church participant and was known to miss community events that conflicted with Bible Study. She was a mother of two and grandmother to eight by the time of her death in 2018. Williams died due to cancer at age 75.

=== Education ===
Upon moving to Seattle, Williams attended Seattle Central College (which was called Seattle Edison at the time of her attendance), and earned an AA degree. Following this, she attended Edwards Beauty School and graduated in 1961.

== Career ==
Williams wrote two short books on the history of the Central District; one was published in 1990 and the second in 1996. Her connection to the mayoral administration of the time helped her secure a grant for the books. Copies of the book are available at the Seattle Public Library

=== Beauty Salon Business ===
Williams opened her first beauty salon at age 22 shortly after her divorce on the corner of 25th Ave and Union St in the heart of Seattle's historically Black Central District in 1965. The shop contained just three salon chairs. When it opened she continued to work two additional jobs at the Seattle Tennis Center and Fircrest Hospital while raising her two children in order to save money to buy a permanent building for her salon. In her search to buy a building, Williams was denied a business loan by 30 different banks. In the 1960s, it was difficult and rare for a single woman to be able to purchase property and especially so for women of color. Reportedly, Williams eventually obtained a loan by convincing a banker to use only her first initial to obscure her gender from the loan application.

Then in 1968, Williams purchased a one-story brick building on E Madison St in the Central District for $35,000 and employed up to 13 women. Her business was often vandalized in the early years. In the 1970s, Williams also opened a boutique in Bellevue, Washington's vibrant business district and hers was the only Black-owned business on the strip. The clothing sold in the boutique was colorful and vibrant, often decorated with sequins. Her clothing was often worn by the women of the community to their Sunday church services. The boutique eventually closed so Williams could focus more time on her activism and political interests. Williams earned several accolades from local governments and civic groups for her work in advancing Black progress in civil rights and community and economic development that were proudly displayed in her salon. She differentiated her business by earning a reputation for vibrant non-natural hair colors done to a high quality. The E Madison storefront persists after her death, with Williams continuing to work on clients' hair until shortly before her death.

In 1983 Williams founded the Central Area Chamber of Commerce to focus on assisting local Black business owners with challenges such as being denied loans that could help them save or grow their businesses. The organization was run out of the same brick building that is home to Williams' salon business. Through the chamber, Williams pursued a passion of educating her community and encouraging they become involved in city planning and development. In this capacity, Williams published a Black business directory, a calendar of community events, assisted in the founding of a local newspaper, and stepped further into the political activism sphere.

In the early twenty-first century, the Central District began gentrifying and many Black owned businesses began to disappear from the neighborhood, often times being replaced by apartment buildings. Williams attributed the departure of Black businesses to rising rents, and believed that property ownership was a major contributor to her long-lasting success. Real estate developers sought to buy Williams' E Madison property from her, but she remained adamant the business and property remain in the family. Williams was disheartened and angered to learn in 2018 that developers had purchased the plot of land available adjacent to her business on the corner of 21st and Madison, and that a multi-story complex would be built to overshadow her humble building. At the time of her death, Seattle residents who had grown up in the Central District saw DeCharlene's Salon as a last bastion that remained of the mid-century golden age of Black owned small businesses.

Before her death, Williams reportedly had hopes to open a beauty school. Media artifacts of Williams' contributions to Seattle have been preserved by the Museum of History & Industry which has also hosted events in her honor. Williams' daughter Rita Green donated the DeCharlene Williams Legacy Collection to the Black Heritage Society of Washington State, Seattle, WA. The collection contains photographs, documents, ephemera, and film that are held in public trust.

==== Posthumous legacy of the salon ====
Following her death the salon is owned an operated by Williams' daughter Rita Green and her niece and granddaughter are head stylists. Williams was posthumously honored at a celebration in July 2018 at the Northwest African American Museum.

=== Activism and Political campaigns ===
In 1965 Williams founded the Central Area Youth Association. In 1969 she formed a modeling group called Invasions that put on fashion shows at local venues some of which were for charity fundraising. Invasions raised $50,000 for the Seattle Fire Department to purchase the first Medic One wagon.

For decades alongside her operating her businesses, Williams volunteered with committees to organize local celebrations of Martin Luther King Jr. Day and Juneteenth. Williams was particularly enthusiastic about Juneteenth because she was a descendent of Texan slaves. In 2016, Williams estimate she sat on about 13 different committees for community development.

In the 1980s Williams served on a Small Business Task Force put together by Mayor Charles Royer.

In 1993, Williams ran for mayor of Seattle. Her platform included rent control, job creation, and support for businesses in her neighborhood. Williams lost in the primary.

In 1997, Williams ran for city council.
