= Manuel Lopes (barber) =

- Born: c. 1812; Island of Fogo, Portuguese Cape Verde
- Died: December 23, 1895; Seattle, Washington
- Occupation: Barber

Manuel Lopes (c. 1812 – December 23, 1895), also known as Emanuel Lopes, was Seattle's first black resident whose identity is known, as well as its first barber.

== Early life ==
Born on the island of Fogo in the Cape Verde Islands in roughly 1812, Lopes arrived in the United States on a whaling ship. According to the history of Cape Verde in "1810 whaling ships from Massachusetts and Rhode Island in the United States recruited crews from the islands of Brava and Fogo." However, he may have been brought to the U.S. after being kidnapped or enslaved. He first settled in Maine and then in Massachusetts, in the city of New Bedford. He married Susannah Jones in 1841 at New Bedford, Massachusetts and they had a son William H Lopes.

== Seattle career ==
Lopes arrived in Seattle either in 1858 or 1852, soon after the founding of the town. In 1858, Seattle had under 180 non-indigenous residents. Lopes' wife died shortly after he left Massachusetts. Lopes became the city's first black resident and its first barber. He also installed the city's first barber chair, imported by boat around South America.

As a propertied individual, Lopes ran a restaurant on Commercial Street (later First Ave South) in the same building where he lived and plied his barber trade. He had a reputation for providing free meals to people who could not afford to pay.

Lopes was a musician and known to signal mealtimes by marching up and down Seattle's main thoroughfare, beating out a rhythm on a snare drum. He similarly headed parades celebrating Independence Day in the US. He was Seattle's only snare drummer in the 1850s.

William Grose, Seattle's second Black resident, moved to the town in 1861 and created a restaurant and hotel, later adding a barbershop. Robert Dixon moved to Seattle in 1865 and worked for Lopes as a barber, later establishing his own shop.

By 1870 Lopes was one of thirteen recorded Black residents of Seattle. Sarah and William Grose had the only Black family in the town at the time. Rather, most were single men who had migrated gradually from the Eastern U.S., working in Seattle as barbers, cooks, waiters, and cafe owners. These were some of the only job opportunities open to Black people in Seattle. Six of the city's Black residents in 1870 were barbers, and more broadly, barbershops were vehicles of economic prosperity for Black men in the 19th century. The Black men running Seattle businesses mostly served white customers in the logging and trade industries, and a Black community had not yet formed in the town.

== Later life ==
In the early 1870s, Lopes moved to Port Gamble, Washington, in search of work as a result of one of many economic downturns that struck Seattle. He befriended Cyrus Walker, who ran the Puget Mill Company. Later in life, Lopes apparently suffered from dropsy, for which he was admitted to Providence Hospital in 1885.

Lopes died at Providence Hospital, Seattle, Washington on December 23, 1895, after a long illness. He was buried in Port Gamble according to Walker's arrangements.

== Sources ==
- Lindley, Robin. (2013, April 3). "Slavery? Yes, it did happen here. As did escapes." Retrieved from Crosscut.
- Paul De Barros. Jackson Street After Hours: The Roots of Jazz in Seattle. Seattle: Sasquatch Books, 1993.
- "Seattle History: The Seattle Times". The Seattle Times. Archived from the original on December 5, 2001.
- Seattle Post Intelligencer article
