= William Grose (pioneer) =

African-American Seattle pioneer (1835–1898)

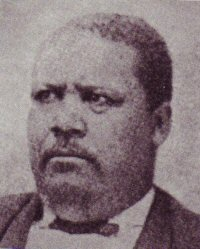
- Born: c. 1835; Washington, D.C.
- Died: July 27, 1898 (aged 63); Seattle, Washington
- Resting place: Lake View Cemetery, Seattle, Washington
- Other name: William Gross
- Occupations: ship steward, hotel owner, restaurant owner, rancher, businessman, miner
- Spouse: Sarah Grose
- Children: 3

William Grose (sometimes spelled Gross) (c. 1835 – July 27, 1898) was an African-American pioneer of Seattle. He was that city's second black resident, and the wealthiest nineteenth-century member of Seattle's black community. His ranch on the former outskirts of town, along East Madison Street, eventually became the center of Seattle's black middle class.

== Biography ==
Grose was born in Washington, D.C., to a free black restaurant owner. He enlisted into the US Navy at the age of 15. He left the navy to settle in California and British Columbia before arriving in Seattle in 1861, as a ship's steward, followed shortly after by his wife, Sarah, and two children. Sarah Grose and their daughter Rebecca were Seattle's first female black residents. Grose was encouraged by the then Governor Isaac Stevens to settle in Washington Territory after finding and keeping safe the governor's watch.

Grose arrived in Seattle before 1870. In 1876 Grose opened a restaurant and hotel on Yesler Way called "Our House", which was popular with Seattle's largely white population, and later added a barbershop. Restaurants and barber shops were two of the only occupations open to blacks in pioneer Seattle, which, though it did not have the explicitly racist laws of neighboring states like Oregon and Idaho, offered black opportunity only in limited, usually menial positions. The important lumbering, mining, and shipping industries of early Seattle and environs were closed to blacks. Seattle's first black resident, Manuel Lopes (who arrived in 1858, just seven years after the Denny Party landed on Alki), also was a cook and a barber. Grose's hotel provided lodging for many of Seattle's earliest black residents, who arrived as transient laborers in the latter part of the nineteenth century.

He was successful enough to buy, in 1882, twelve acres along East Madison Street from Henry Yesler. After Grose's hotel burned in the Great Seattle Fire in 1889, he moved his home to 2813 E Howell where he lived at the time of his death. After his death his widow, Sara, lived at 1729 24th Avenue. The house next door at 1733 24th Avenue, is often credited with being his house but it was built in 1901 after his death. He gradually sold off house lots to other successful African-Americans in Seattle's small community, and this area became the northern anchor of what eventually became Seattle's Central District. The southern anchor, Jackson Street, was poorer, more transient, and rowdier, being part of Pioneer Square.

By the 1890s, Grose was Seattle's wealthiest black resident. In 1891 Grose, along with Dr. Samuel Burdett and Conrad Rideout, formed the Cornerstone Grand Lodge of the York Masons, Seattle's first black Masonic chapter. Women relatives of the black Masons formed the Queen of Sheba Court. This lodge led annual parades down Madison Street from its inception until the 1940s.

Grose was a trustee of Seattle's first African-American church, the Jones Street African Methodist Episcopal Church (now First AME Church), which was founded in 1891, by Reverend L. S. Blakeney, Seaborn J. Collins, Alfred P. Freeman, and Grose's son George H. Grose.

Grose died on July 27, 1898, and is buried in Lake View Cemetery (Seattle). His manner of death was recorded as dropsy.

== Legacy ==
In Madison Valley, there is a park named after him.

The William Grose Center for Cultural Innovation was opened on the corner of 23rd and Yesler on September 16, 2022. Under the legacy of William Grose, the Africatown Community Land Trust (ACLT) transformed the decommissioned Fire Station 6 into a technology center dedicated to helping mold Seattle’s next generation of tech developers, creative professionals, and future entrepreneurs.
