= Seattle Black Panther Party History and Memory Project =

The Black Panther Party History and Memory Project, also known as the SBPP Project, is a multimedia effort to chronicle the Seattle chapter of the Black Panther Party. Founded in 1968, the Seattle Chapter was one of the first to be formed outside Oakland and became one of longest lived bases of the Party. The Project is the largest online collection of materials about any branch of the organization. The materials include detailed video oral histories, historical documents and photographs and the complete transcript of a 1970 Congressional Hearing held on the Seattle Chapter. The Seattle Civil Rights and Labor History Project at the University of Washington initiated the projcect in 2005.

== Content ==
An original essay details the height of the Seattle Chapter, between 1968 and 1970, from its formation by Black Student Union members to a narrowly averted raid on Party headquarters. This is accompanied by more than 100 digitized newspaper articles that appeared between 1968 and 1979, recollections of members and former Seattle Mayor Wes Uhlman, rare personal photograph collections, and copies of the Chapter's newspaper. Like other sections of the Seattle Civil Rights and Labor History Project, the site contains model lesson plans for middle school and high school teachers using the available materials.

Circa 2017, Patricia Boiko, a local Seattle filmmaker, realized that despite the involvement of women in the Seattle Black Panther Party, there was no accounting of their stories in the SBBP Project. Together with fellow filmmaker Tajuan LaBee who also had an interest in the history of the Black Panthers, they interviewed several of these women and put together a film about them, Keepers of the Dream: Seattle Women Black Panthers (2020). These interviews became part of the SBBP Project.

== See also ==
- Black Panther Park
- The People's Wall
