= McClellan Butte =

Mountain in Washington (state), United States

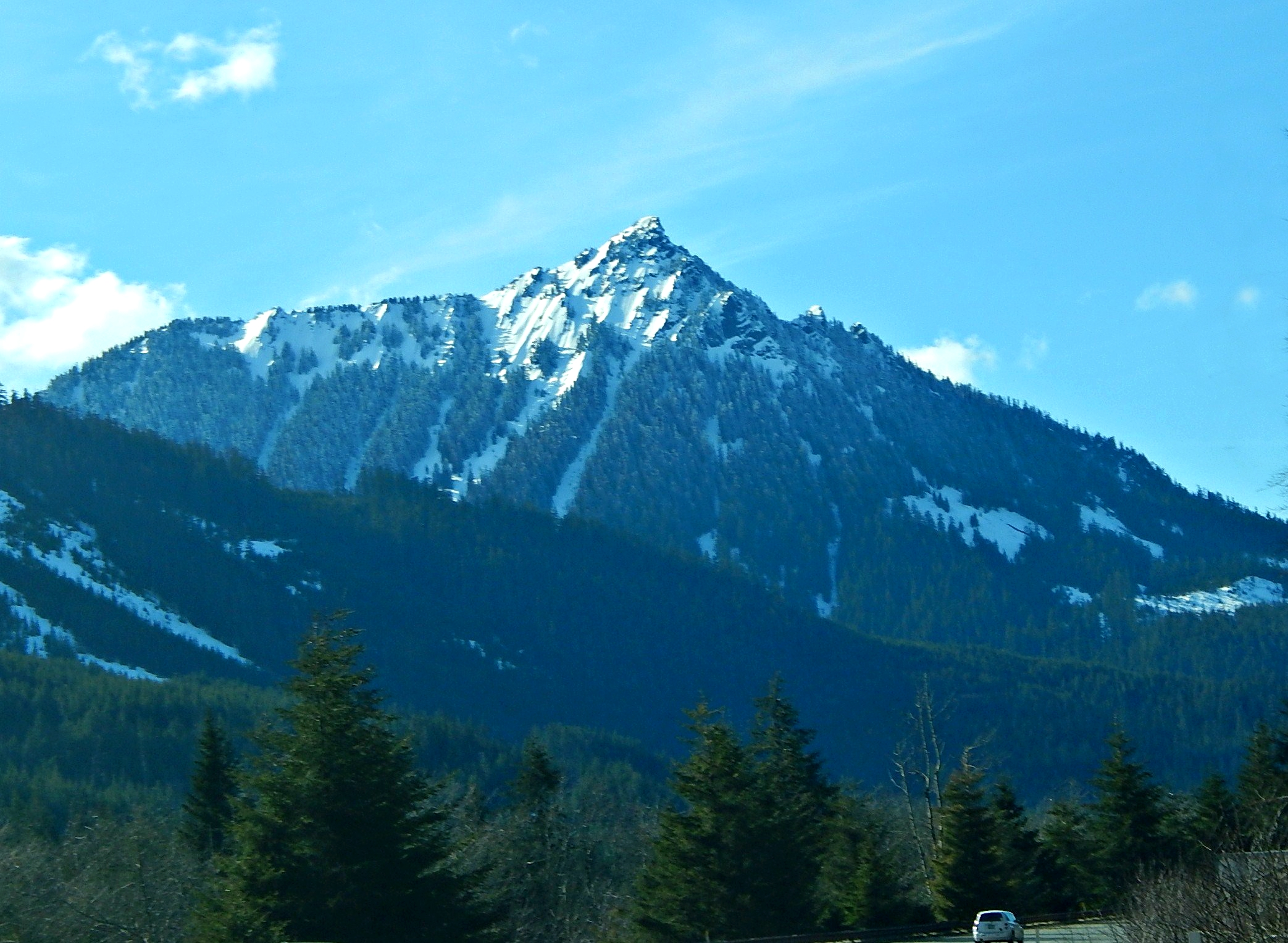
- McClellan Butte from westbound Interstate 90

Highest point
- Elevation: 5,162 ft (1,573 m) NAVD 88
- Prominence: 1,442 ft (440 m)
- Coordinates: 47°24′25″N 121°37′20″W

Geography
- Location within Washington (state) Location within the United States
- Location: King County, Washington, U.S.
- Parent range: Cascade Range
- Topo map: USGS Bandera

Climbing
- Easiest route: Maintained Hiking Trail, Short final rock scramble

McClellan Butte is a prominent peak in the Cascade Range in King County, Washington 11 miles east of North Bend. The McClellan Butte hiking trail is a difficult trail known as an alternative to Mount Si's crowded trail.

Avalanches can occur in winter months. In March 2018, two snowshoers were caught in an avalanche but both survived.

== Climate ==
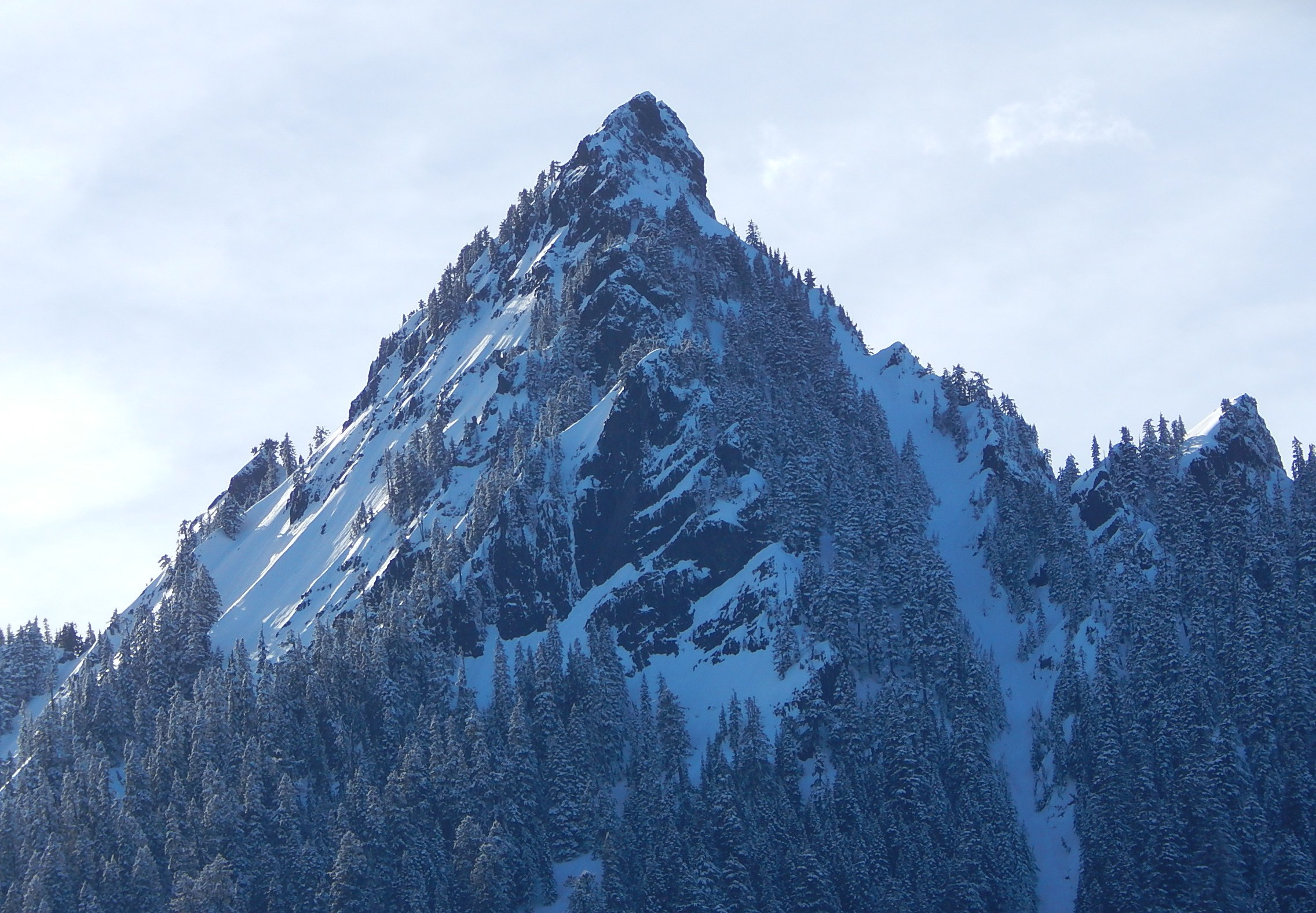
Summit in winter

McClellan Butte is located in the marine west coast climate zone of western North America. Most weather fronts originate in the Pacific Ocean, and travel northeast toward the Cascade Mountains. As fronts approach, they are forced upward by the peaks of the Cascade Range, causing them to drop their moisture in the form of rain or snowfall onto the Cascades (Orographic lift). As a result, the west side of the Cascades experiences high precipitation, especially during the winter months in the form of snowfall. During winter months, weather is usually cloudy, but, due to high pressure systems over the Pacific Ocean that intensify during summer months, there is often little or no cloud cover during the summer. Precipitation runoff from McClellan Butte drains into the Snoqualmie River.

== See also ==
- Mount Washington (Cascades)
- Mount Kent
