= Mount Washington (Cascades) =

Mountain in Washington (state), United States

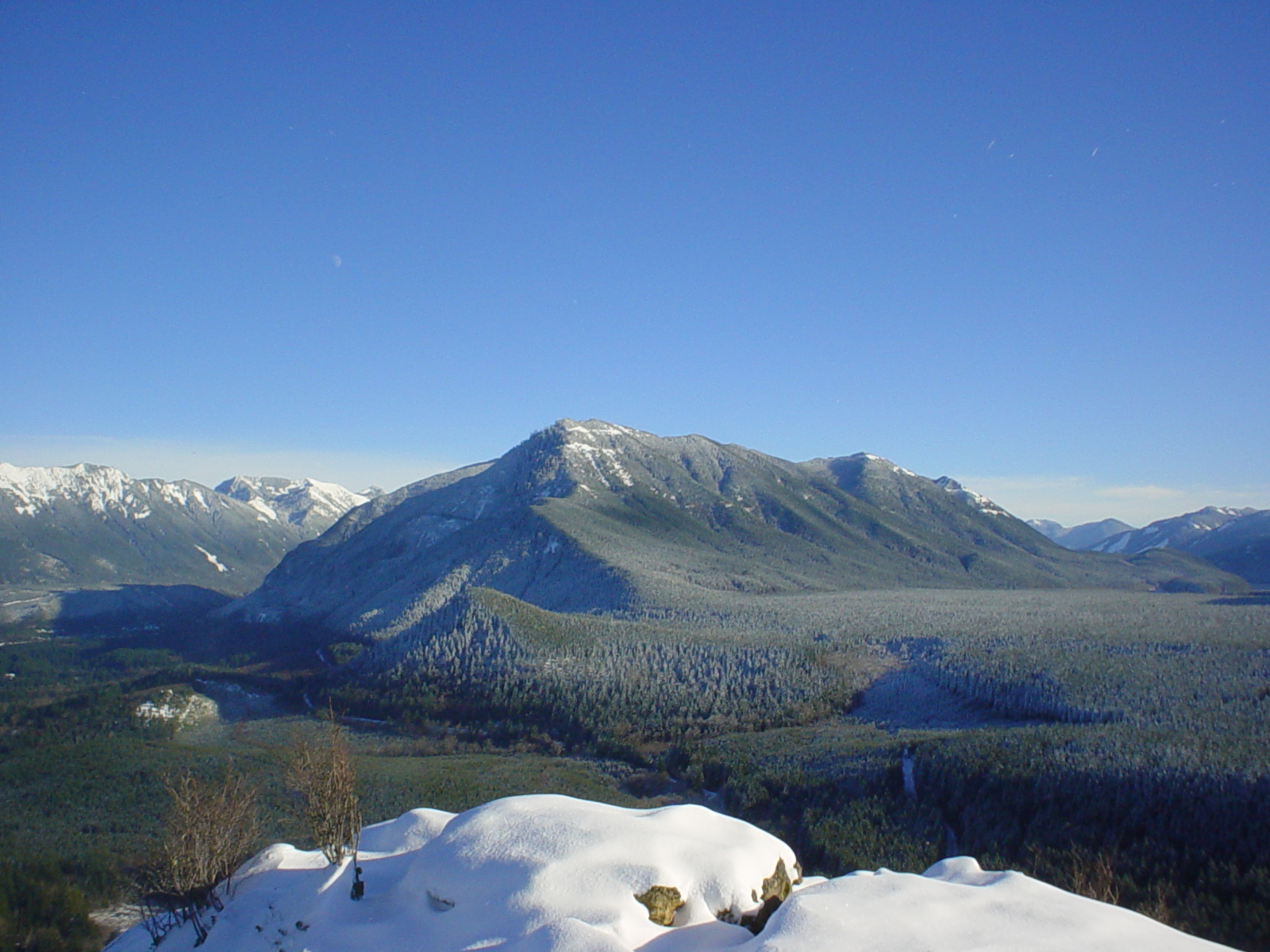
- Mount Washington as seen from Rattlesnake Ledge

Highest point
- Elevation: 4,400+ ft (1,340+ m)
- Prominence: 280 ft (90 m)
- Coordinates: 47°25′33″N 121°42′00″W

Geography
- Location: King County, Washington, U.S.
- Parent range: Cascades
- Topo map: USGS Chester Morse Lake

Climbing
- Easiest route: No formal hiking trail

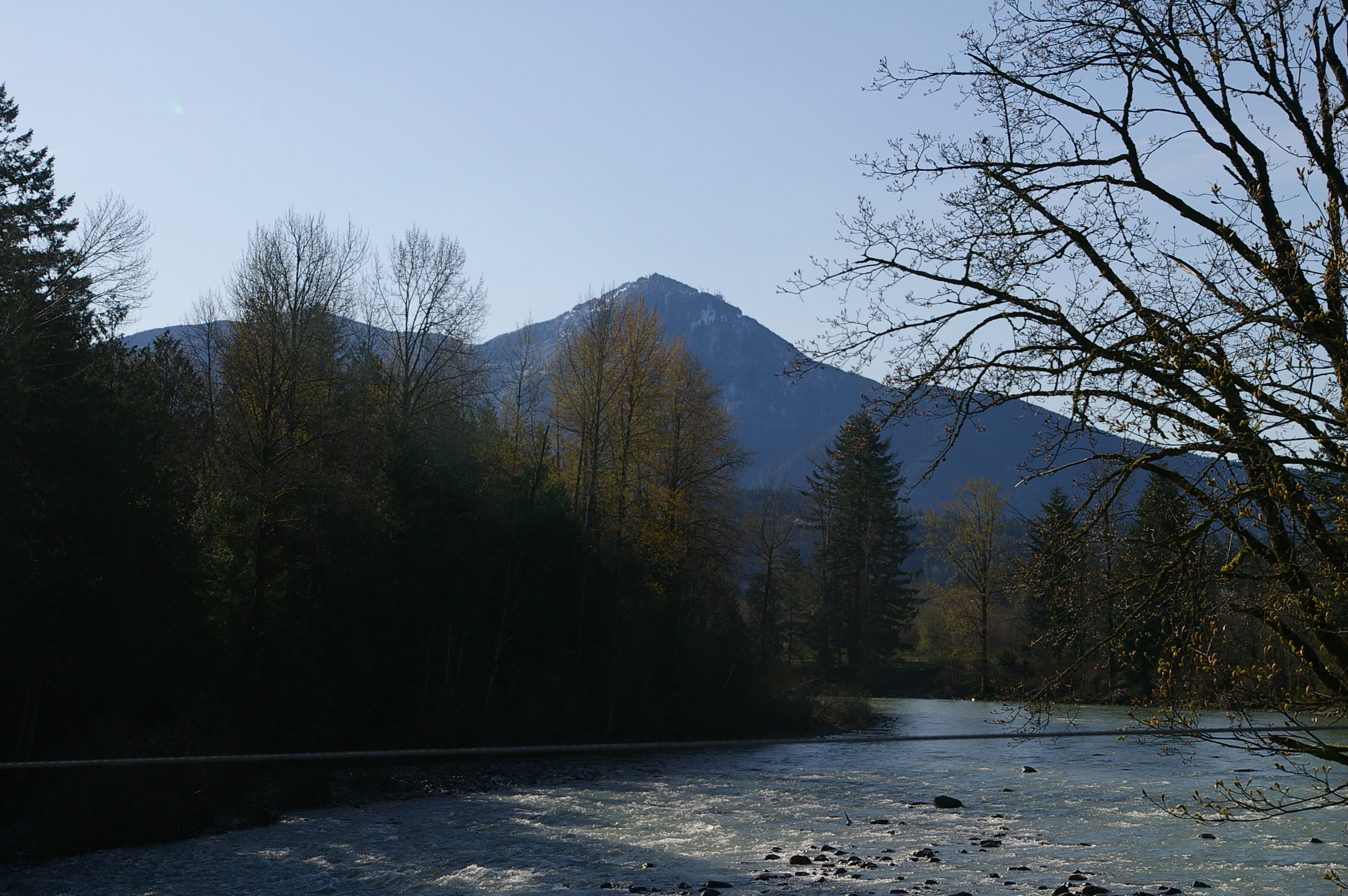
Mount Washington as seen from the middle fork of the Snoqualmie River near North Bend

Mount Washington is a small mountain in the US state of Washington roughly 30 miles (48 km) east-southeast of Seattle, Washington along Interstate 90. It lies on the western margin of the Cascade Range just above the coastal plains around Puget Sound, and is southeast of nearby town of North Bend.

Once known as Profile Mountain, Mount Washington was named due to a cliff resembling a profile of George Washington when viewed from an angle.

The hike to the top of Mt. Washington is known for its view. Cedar Butte lies at the west end of the mountain.

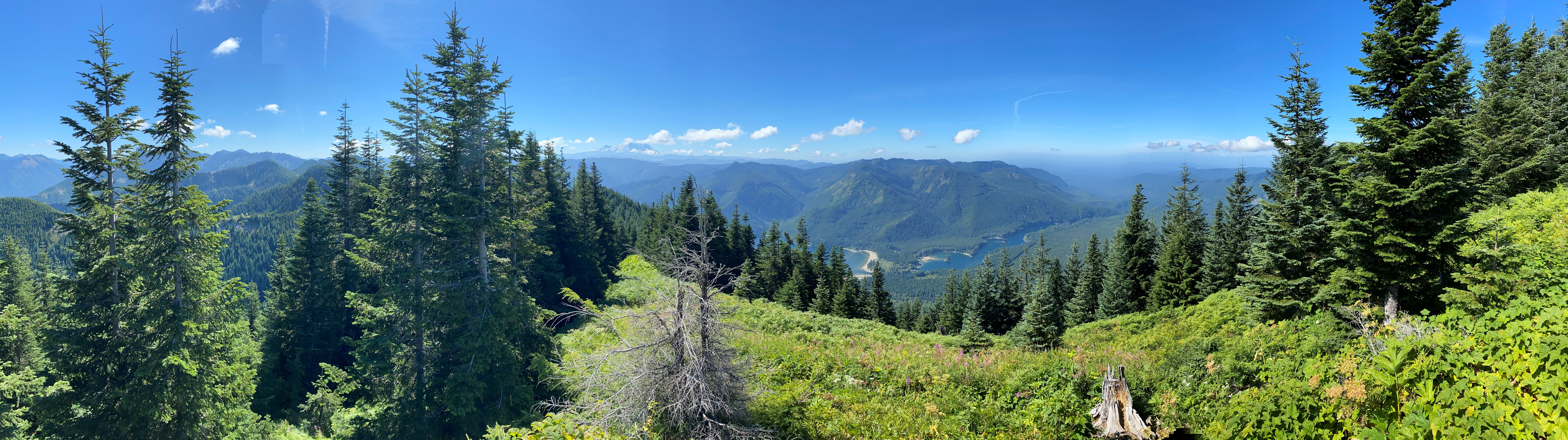
A view of Chester Morse Lake from the Mount Washington trail peak.

== See also ==
- Mount Si
- Little Si
