= King County Metro =

Public transit operator in King County, Washington, US

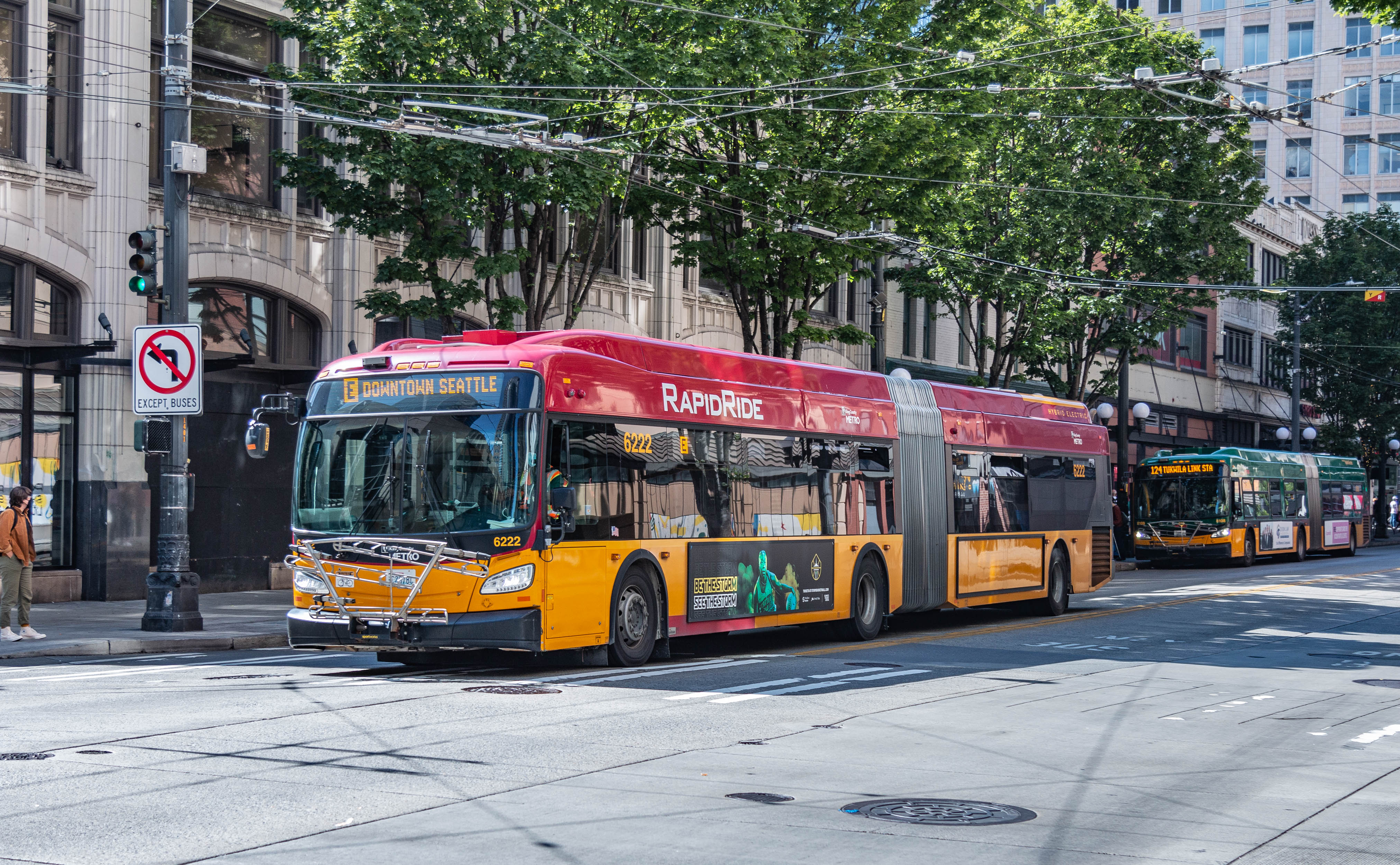
- A King County Metro bus operating on the RapidRide E Line in Downtown Seattle
- Founded: January 1, 1973; 53 years ago
- Headquarters: 201 S. Jackson Street; Seattle, Washington, U.S.
- Service area: King County, Washington
- Service type: Bus, vanpool, paratransit
- Alliance: Sound Transit
- Routes: 131 (list)
- Stops: 8,521 (2012)
- Hubs: 25 transit centers
- Depots: 8 bus bases
- Fleet: 1,253 buses (details)
- Daily ridership: 307,600 (weekdays, Q2 2026)
- Annual ridership: 94,481,800 (2025)
- Fuel type: Battery electric, Diesel-electric hybrid, Electric trolleybus
- General manager: Michelle Allison
- Website: kingcounty.gov/en/dept/metro

King County Metro, officially the King County Metro Transit Department and often shortened to Metro, is the public transit authority of King County, Washington, United States, which includes the city of Seattle. It is the eighth-largest transit bus agency in the United States. In 2025, the system had a ridership of 94,481,800, or about 307,600 per weekday as of the second quarter of 2026. Metro employs 2,428 full-time and part-time operators and operates a fleet of 1,089 buses. The agency has 131 routes, including several dial-a-ride services; a paratransit system; and a large vanpool network.

The agency was founded as the Municipality of Metropolitan Seattle in 1958 to coordinate wastewater treatment in King County and was reorganized into a county transit agency on January 1, 1973. Metro took over operations from the Seattle Transit System, founded in 1939, and Overlake Transit Service, a private operator founded in 1927 to serve the Eastside. It was a separate government agency until it was merged into the King County government in 1994 and has since been governed by the King County Council. Metro is funded primarily by sales tax and also receives revenue from property taxes, fares, and grants.

Metro's bus routes include electric trolleybuses in Seattle, RapidRide enhanced buses on eight lines, commuter routes along the regional freeway system, dial-a-ride routes, and overnight routes. Metro is also contracted to operate and maintain Sound Transit's 1 Line and 2 Line light rail services, eight Sound Transit Express bus routes, and two Seattle Streetcar lines owned by the City of Seattle.

== History ==
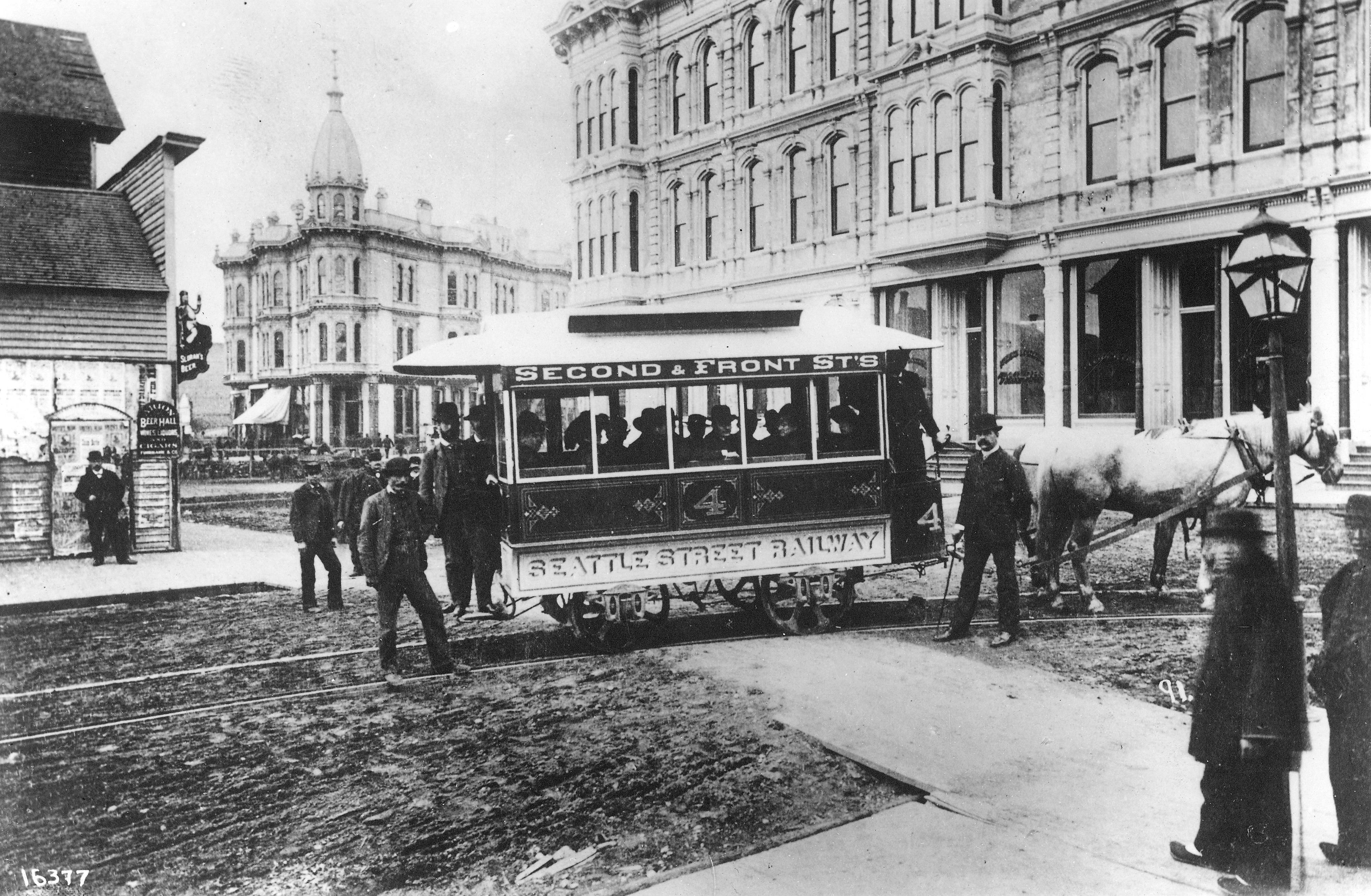
Seattle Street Railway's first streetcar at Occidental Avenue and Yesler Way with Mayor John Leary and city officials in the fall of 1884

A horse-drawn streetcar rail system debuted in Seattle in 1884 as the Seattle Street Railway, the first of many private companies to build railways in the city. In 1918, the Seattle city government acquired the remaining private lines, which had consolidated into the Seattle Street Railway, after they had faced financial trouble. A new transportation agency, the Seattle Transit System, was formed in 1939 and refinanced the remaining debt from the streetcars. The agency began replacing equipment with "trackless trolleys" (now known as trolleybuses) and motor buses. The final streetcar ran on April 13, 1941.

The Municipality of Metropolitan Seattle was created by a local referendum on September 9, 1958, as a regional authority tasked with management of wastewater and water quality issues in King County. The authority was formed after civic leaders, including those in the Municipal League, noted that solutions to regional issues were complicated by local boundaries and a plethora of existing special districts. The state legislature approved the formation of a combined transportation, sewage, and planning authority in 1957, but the countywide referendum was rejected by a majority outside of Seattle. Metro, as the authority came to be called, was restricted to sewage management and given a smaller suburban jurisdiction ahead of the successful September referendum. By 1967, the agency had completed its $125 million sewage treatment system, which diverted 20 million gallons (76 million liters) that had previously contaminated Lake Washington.

The logo of Metro Transit from 1978 to 1997

After two failed attempts to enable it to build a regional rapid transit system, the Municipality of Metropolitan Seattle was authorized to operate a regional bus system in 1972. The bus system was known as Metro Transit and began operations on January 1, 1973; other suggested names included King Area Rapid Transit (KART) and Seattle Metropolitan Area Rapid Transit (SMART). Its operations subsumed the Seattle Transit System, formerly under the purview of the City of Seattle and the Metropolitan Transit Corporation, a private company serving suburban cities in King County. Metropolitan had faced bankruptcy because of low ridership and planned to cancel several routes; the King County Council voted in October 1971 to temporarily fund six routes through a lease with Metropolitan to prevent their cancelation. A full transfer of Metropolitan's assets and routes was approved shortly before Metro Transit began operations; as part of the takeover, an agreement to operate commuter buses from Snohomish County was signed in December 1972. Metro Transit acquired 91 buses from Metropolitan and leased additional buses from the Southern California Rapid Transit District to meet expected demand; contracted service to rural areas as far as Skykomish and Black Diamond was provided by Evergreen Trailways.

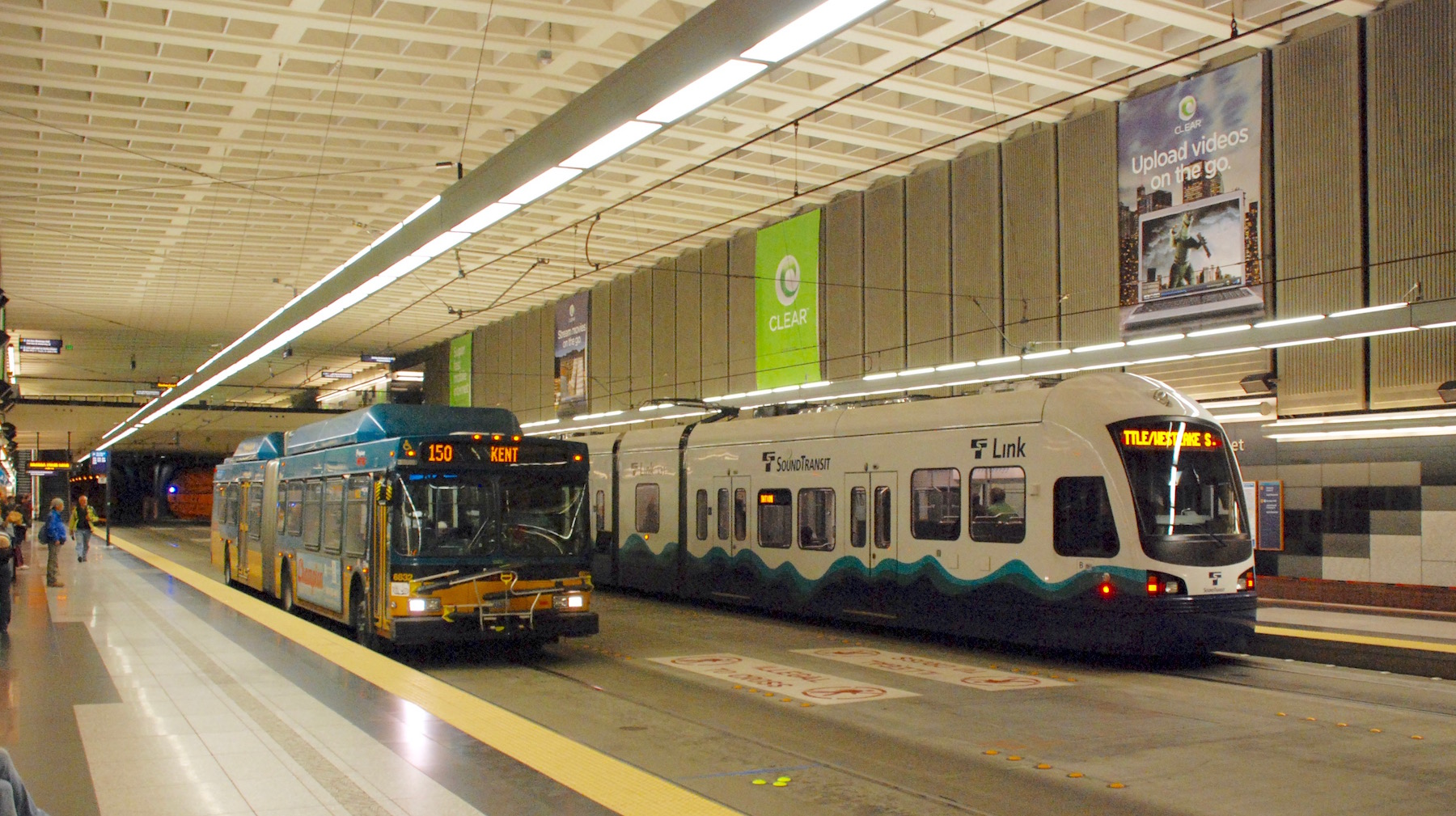
A hybrid electric King Country Metro bus passing a Link light rail train at University Street station (now Symphony station) in 2010

Metro Transit introduced its new services in September 1973, including a ride-free area in downtown and express routes on freeways (known as "Flyer" routes), and a unified numbering scheme in 1977 that replaced named routes. The agency introduced its first paratransit service in 1979, which was followed by buses equipped with wheelchair lifts in 1980. To address bus congestion in Downtown Seattle and prepare for a regional rapid transit system, Metro Transit proposed the construction of the Downtown Seattle Transit Tunnel in the early 1980s. Excavation of the 1.3-mile (2.1 km) tunnel began in 1987 and was completed on September 15, 1990, with five stations under 3rd Avenue and Pine Street. The project cost $455 million to construct and used a fleet of 236 dual-mode diesel–electric buses manufactured in Italy by Breda. Buses on commuter routes would switch to electric trolleybus wires within the tunnel, which was also designed for future use by light rail trains.

The Municipality of Metropolitan Seattle was overseen by a federated board of elected officials, composed of elected officials from cities throughout the region. Its representation structure was ruled unconstitutional in 1990 on the grounds of "one person, one vote" following a similar ruling in Board of Estimate of City of New York v. Morris. After gaining approval by popular vote in 1992, the municipality's roles and authorities were assumed by the government of King County in 1994. The transit operation was a stand-alone department within the county until January 1, 1996, when it became a division of the newly created King County Department of Transportation. The "daisy" logo used by Metro from their inception was replaced by the county government's "crown" emblem in 1997. In August 2018, the county council approved legislation to separate Metro from the Department of Transportation, creating the King County Metro Transit Department effective January 1, 2019.

After completion of the Downtown Seattle Transit Tunnel project in 1990, attention was drawn again to developing a regional rail system. This interest led to the formation of the Central Puget Sound Regional Transit Authority (more commonly known as Sound Transit) which holds primary responsibility for planning and building high capacity transit in the counties of King, Pierce and Snohomish, in western Washington state. Metro was contracted to operate Sound Transit's major light rail line, now the 1 Line of the Link light rail system, and several routes on its Sound Transit Express network. Metro also operates two streetcar routes in Seattle under contract with the Seattle Department of Transportation. The joint use of trains and buses in the Downtown Seattle Transit Tunnel required a two-year closure to install new rails and lower the roadbed for level boarding. The dual-mode Breda buses were replaced by diesel-electric hybrid buses within the tunnel and retrofitted for use on the city's trolleybus network. Bus service in the tunnel ended on March 23, 2019, as part of the demolition of Convention Place station to prepare for an expansion of the Washington State Convention Center. The transit tunnel remained owned and operated by Metro until it was transferred to Sound Transit in 2022.

=== Ride Free Area ===
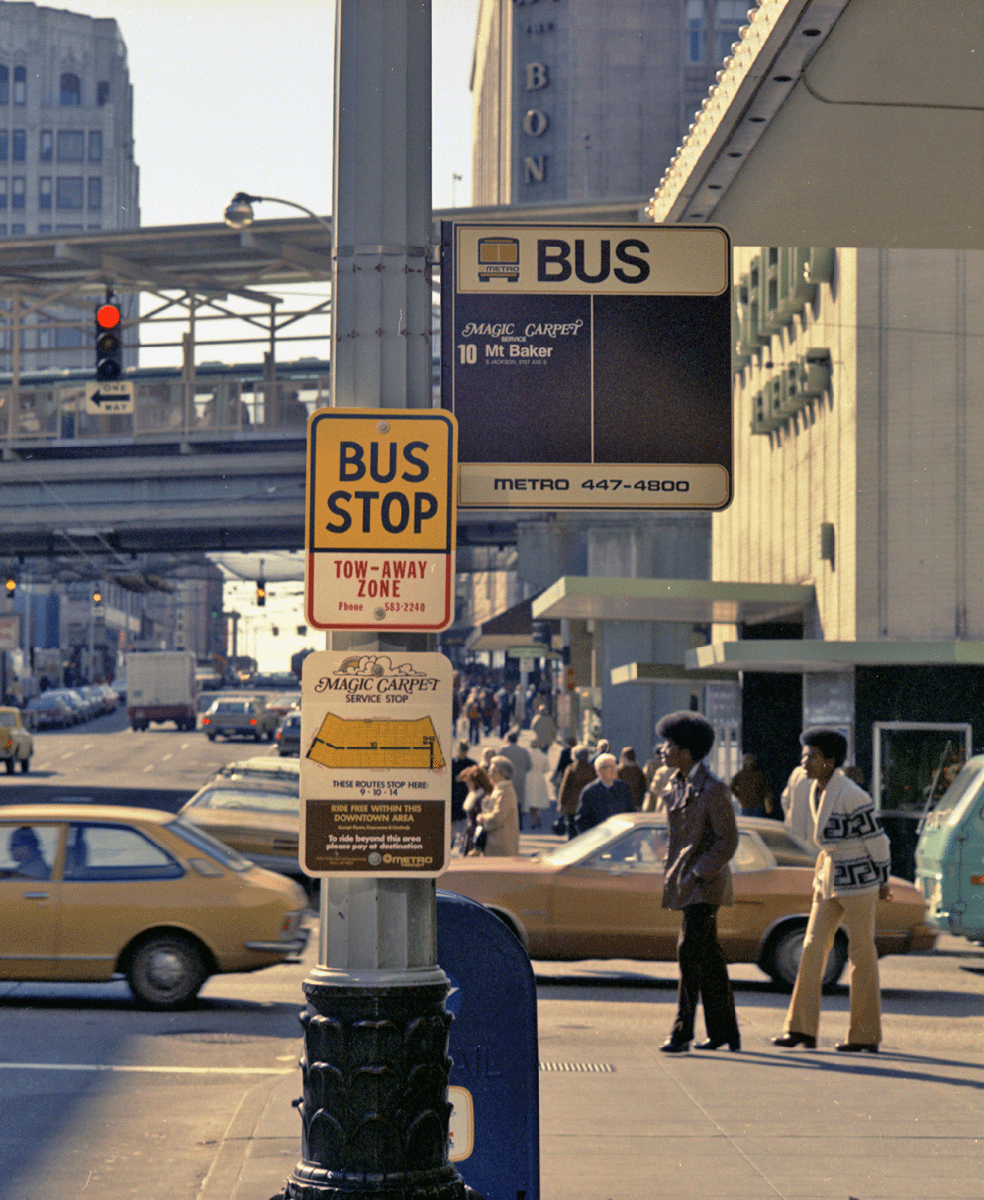
A Downtown Seattle bus stop on Pine Street with a sign for the Magic Carpet zone, 1975

For almost 40 years, until 2012, most of downtown Seattle was designated as a zero-fare zone, an area in which all rides on Metro vehicles were free, known as the "Ride Free" Area. Intended to encourage transit usage, improve accessibility and encourage downtown shopping, the zone was created in September 1973 and was originally called the "Magic Carpet" zone. It was later renamed the Ride Free Area (RFA). The RFA extended from the north at Battery St. to S. Jackson St. on the south and east at 6th Avenue to the waterfront on the west. Until 1987, the zone was in effect 24 hours a day, but in October of that year Metro began requiring fare payment within the zone during night-time hours, between 9 p.m. and 4 a.m., to reduce fare-related conflicts that sometimes led to assaults on drivers; in February 1994, the RFA's hours were reduced further, with fare payment required between 7 p.m. and 6 a.m.

A King County Auditor's Office report released in September 2009 found that Metro "can neither fully explain nor provide backup documentation for the operating cost savings that offset the fare revenues in the calculation of the annual charges to the City of Seattle for the city's Ride Free Area" and that some assumptions in the methodology Metro used to calculate the amount of lost fares were "questionable" and have not been updated to reflect changes to the fare structure and fare collection methods.

On September 29, 2012, the Ride Free Area was eliminated. All riders boarding in downtown must now pay as they board.

== Services ==
Metro carried a total of 94.4 million boardings across all of its services in 2025. Fixed bus routes carried 88.4 million trips, followed by 1.6 million in vanpools, 1.0 million on dial-a-ride buses, 0.75 million paratransit trips, 0.37 million for Metro Flex, and 0.5 million on the King County Water Taxi.

=== Routes ===
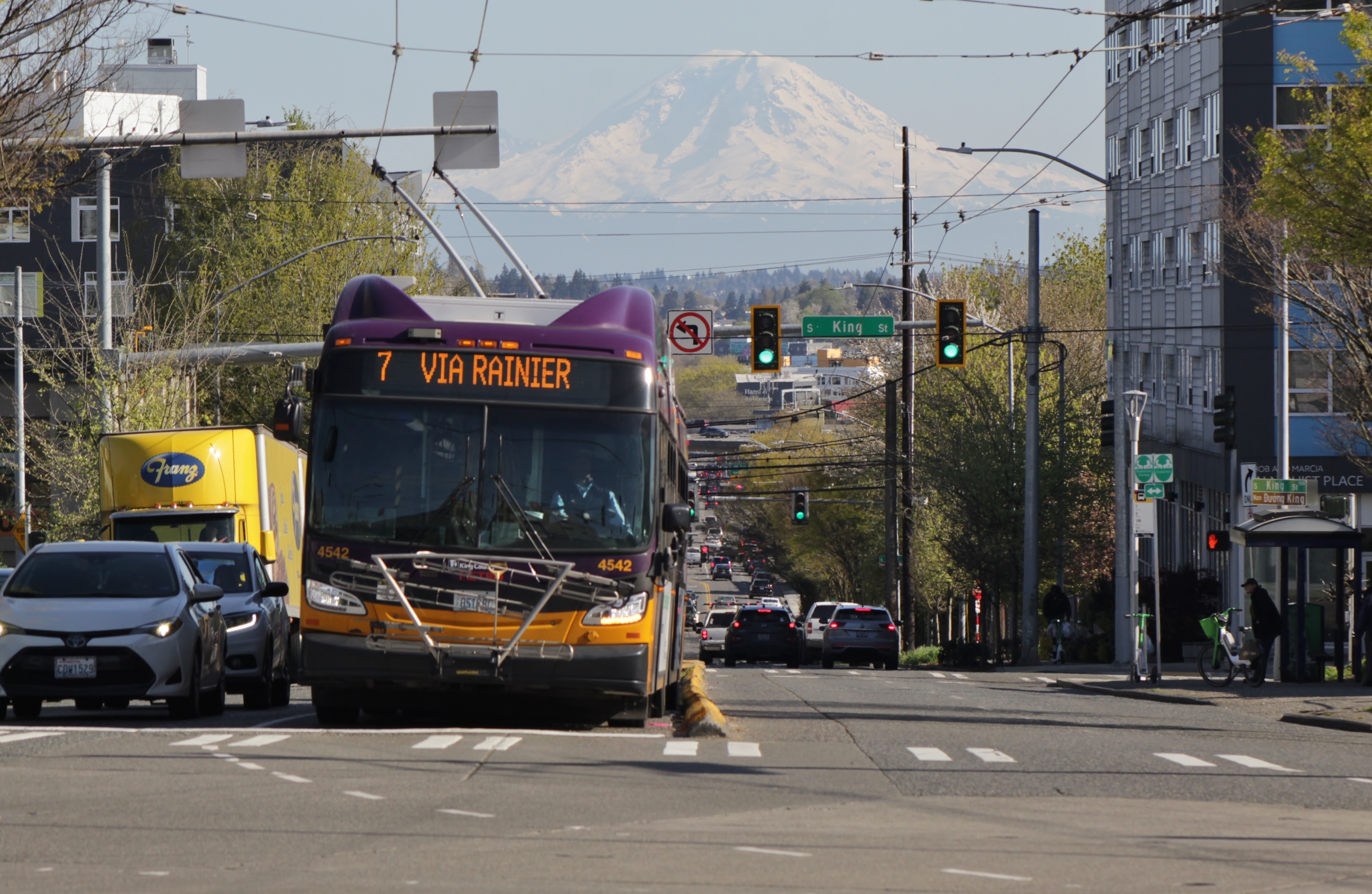
An electric trolleybus on Route 7 in Seattle

Metro has 131 bus routes that combine service patterns typical of both city and suburban bus networks, carrying over 280,000 daily passengers as of October 2024. The agency's ridership peaked at 425,000 daily passengers in October 2015. The city network was descended in large part from the Seattle Transit system of converted streetcar routes and operated in a hub-and-spoke pattern centered either on downtown Seattle or the University of Washington, with lesser amounts of crosstown service. The suburban network typically operates on major streets between the regions employment and population centers.

Routes in the Seattle city network are numbered from 1 to 99. Because of the scattershot evolution of the system, there is no easily discernible pattern to the route numbers, although there are clusters in certain neighborhoods. Suburban routes follow a numbering system: 100–199 for South King County, 200–299 for the Eastside, 300–399 for North King County, and 900–999 for dial-a-ride and custom routes.

The in-city routes with the highest ridership are the RapidRide D Line from downtown to Crown Hill via Uptown/Seattle Center and Ballard; the 7, traveling from downtown through the International District to the Rainier Valley; the 40, traveling from downtown through South Lake Union, Fremont, and Ballard to Northgate; the RapidRide C Line from South Lake Union and downtown to West Seattle's Alaska Junction and Westwood Village; the 36, traveling from downtown through the International District to Beacon Hill; the 5 from downtown via the Woodland Park Zoo and Greenwood/Phinney Ridge to Shoreline Community College; the 44, a crosstown route connecting the University District and Ballard; the 8, a crosstown route connecting Uptown/Seattle Center and South Lake Union with Capitol Hill, the Central District and Mount Baker; and the 70, connecting downtown to South Lake Union, Eastlake, and the University District.

The Metro-operated Seattle Streetcar routes are numbered in the 90s, with the South Lake Union Streetcar numbered 98 and the former bus replacement for the Waterfront Streetcar numbered 99.

The suburban system is more numerically organized. Roughly speaking, areas in South King County (from Burien and Des Moines through Renton and Maple Valley) are served by routes numbered in the 100s, areas in East King County (from Renton to Bothell) are served by routes numbered in the 200s, areas in North King County (from Bothell to Shoreline) are served by routes numbered in the 300s. The Metro-operated Sound Transit Express routes are numbered in the 500s.

Route numbers in the lower 900s (901–931) are used for Dial-a-Ride services, while shuttles connecting to the King County Water Taxi are numbered in the 700s. The dial-a-ride system is contracted to Hopelink, a non-profit organization. Since 2003, Metro has contracted with senior charities to operate the Hyde Shuttle system, which provides free rides to elderly or disabled passengers in Seattle and other cities. Metro formerly funded a shuttle system named Ride2 that served West Seattle and Eastgate using contracted private buses, which ended in 2019. A set of three shuttle van services contracted out to private operators, including Via in the Rainier Valley, Community Ride, and Ride Pingo in Kent, were launched starting in 2019. They were merged in 2023 under the "Metro Flex" brand with a shared livery.

Metro is contracted to operate special custom buses. Custom routes that serve schools in Bellevue and on Mercer Island are numbered in the 800s (823, 824, 886–892) and routes serving the private Lakeside School and University Prep numbered in the higher 900s (980–995). Metro also operates custom routes to major employment sites (like Group Health Cooperative in Tukwila and the Boeing Everett Factory). Custom routes are also occasionally established to serve as shuttles for large local events, including Seattle Seahawks and Washington Huskies football games.

Since 2008, Metro has maintained an Emergency Snow Network plan to be implemented during major snowstorms and other periods of inclement weather. The network uses only 67 routes on high-frequency corridors with flat topography to compensate for a reduced number of drivers and workers. Several routes were also split between trunk routes using articulated buses and shuttles to serve hillier areas with smaller buses. The network plan was first implemented during the February 2019 snowstorm. In August 2019, the King County Council voted to waive transit fares during snow emergencies. An earlier plan from the 1980s replaced Seattle–Eastside commuter routes with a set of routes that exclusively served predetermined park and ride lots.

=== RapidRide ===
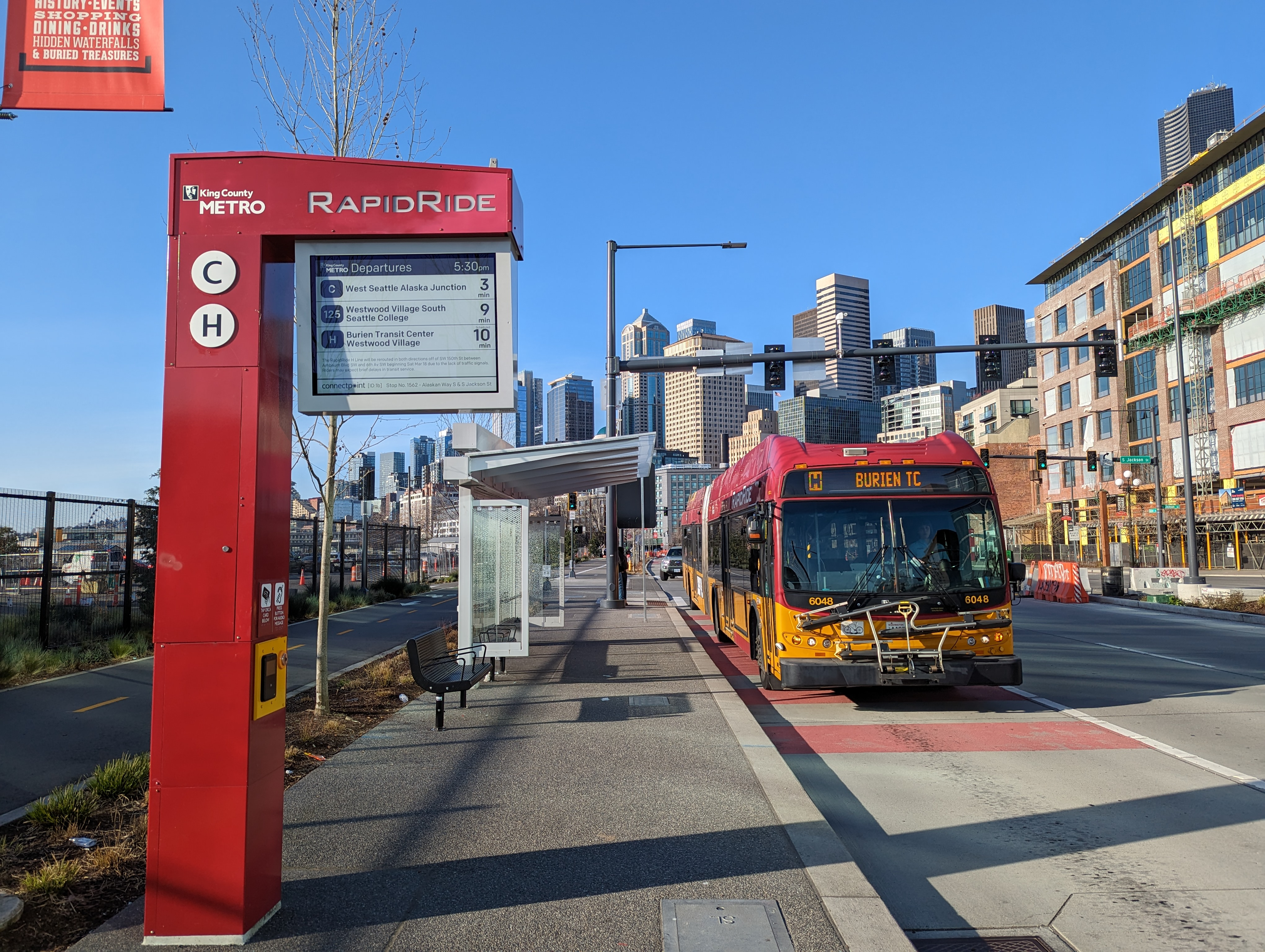
RapidRide service features enhanced bus stops, articulated buses, and frequent service

King County Metro operates RapidRide, a network of limited-stop bus lines with some bus rapid transit features. All RapidRide routes have frequent service with frequencies of 10 minutes or better during peak commuting hours and 15 minutes during most off-peak hours and on weekends. Most lines (except the B and F lines) have late night and early morning service.

RapidRide stops are placed farther apart than typical Metro service to increase speed and reliability. Stops with heavier ridership have "stations" with an awning, seating, lighting, real time information signs to communicate estimate arrival times of RapidRide buses. Most stations and some stops in Downtown Seattle have ORCA card readers that allow passengers to pay before the bus arrives and board at any of the buses' three doors. All lines except the F Line use low-floor, articulated buses that are painted with a distinct red and yellow livery and have onboard Wi-Fi.

The RapidRide corridors are:

- A Line: Tukwila – Federal Way
- B Line: Redmond – Overlake – Bellevue
- C Line: West Seattle – Downtown Seattle – South Lake Union
- D Line: Ballard – Uptown – Downtown Seattle
- E Line: Shoreline – Downtown Seattle
- F Line: Burien – Southcenter – Renton
- G Line: Madison Valley – Downtown Seattle
- H Line: Burien – White Center – West Seattle – Downtown Seattle

=== Freeway express services ===
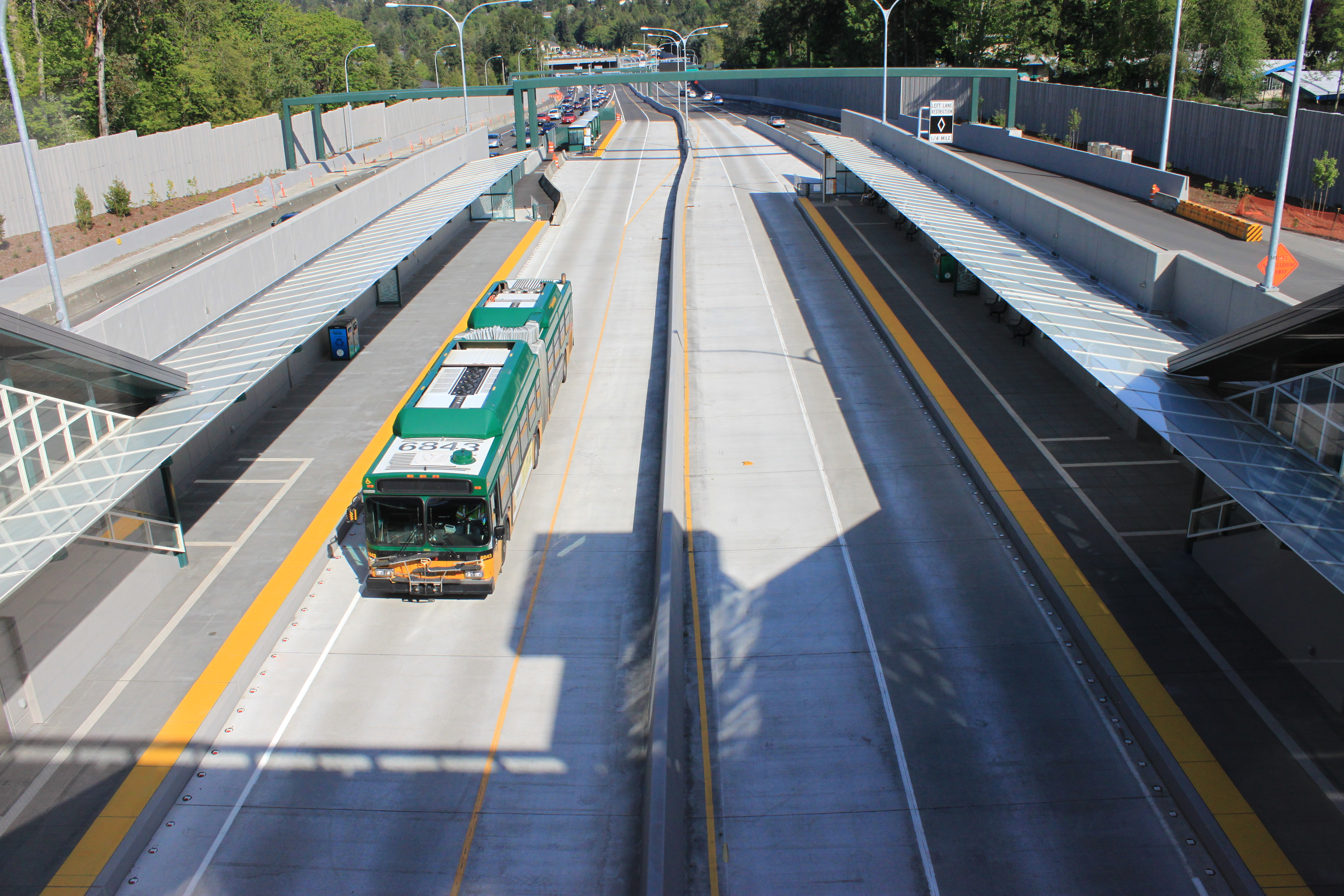
Metro express buses use an extensive network of bus-only infrastructure, such as the Evergreen Point Freeway Station on State Route 520

Metro operates many regional routes serving park and rides, which travel on the region's extensive network of high occupancy vehicle lanes. This practice was pioneered at Seattle Transit as the Blue Streak express bus service running between Northgate Park & Ride and Downtown Seattle. Special stops called "freeway flyers" or freeway stations were constructed to allow efficient transfer between local and express buses.

The first freeway flyer stop opened in 1975 at Montlake Boulevard and State Route 520. Metro also uses HOV direct-access ramps and freeway stations that were constructed by Sound Transit to improve speed and reliability of its commuter routes.

=== Skip-stop spacing ===
Metro uses skip-stop spacing on 3rd Avenue in Downtown Seattle, whereby buses skip every other bus stop to manage congestion. Each bus route is assigned to Blue, Yellow, Red or Green stop groups and each bus stop has two color designations; in the northbound direction, every other bus stop is a Red/Yellow or Green/Blue stop, while in the southbound direction they are Green/Yellow and Red/Blue. The bus stop color groupings are identified by a colored plate installed above or on the side of the bus stop sign; there are additional colored markers one block ahead of each bus stop on the trolley overhead wires, to help bus drivers identify the colors of the upcoming bus stop. The skip-stop system was also used for commuter and regional routes on 2nd and 4th avenues, with routes grouped into Orange and White stops, until 2026.

=== Night Owl services ===
Metro operates a network of 13 routes with late-night "Night Owl" service, which is defined as having regular service between midnight and 5 am. The Night Owl network is made up of some of Metro's most popular routes, and is designed to connect neighborhoods with major transportation hubs including downtown Seattle, Sea–Tac Airport, park & ride lots, transit centers, and Link stations (providing service during the hours when trains are not in service). The City of Seattle's transportation benefit district funds service on Night Owl routes that operate entirely within the city limits.

Routes with Night Owl service include the 7, 36, 48, 49, 124, 160, 161, and the RapidRide A, C, D, E, G and H Lines.

=== Trailhead Direct ===
King County Metro contracts with Hopelink to operate a weekend express shuttle between Seattle and hiking areas in the Cascade foothills called Trailhead Direct from April to October. The service, operated in partnership with the county's park and recreation department and private companies, is intended to relieve parking issues at popular trailheads at peak times. It debuted in 2017 and was expanded the following year to cover three routes: Capitol Hill station to Mount Si; Mount Baker station to the Issaquah Alps; and a shuttle from North Bend to Mailbox Peak. A fourth route, between Tukwila International Boulevard station, Renton, and Cougar Mountain, was added in 2019. The service was suspended in 2020 due to the COVID-19 pandemic and returned in 2021 with only two routes. Due to staffing issues, service to the Issaquah Alps was suspended for the 2022 and 2023 seasons but returned in 2024. The Trailhead Direct routes carried a total of 11,400 passenger trips in 2023 using a fleet of smaller buses with 14 to 32 seats.

== Fares ==
King County Metro has had a flat rate fare structure for all riders since July 2018. The flat rate of $3 for adults and $1 for senior, disabled and qualified low-income passengers replaced a previous system with two zones—divided between Seattle and the rest of the county—and peak period surcharges. A separate rate of $1.50 was levied for youth passengers and ORCA Lift low-income passholders until September 2022; the ORCA Lift rate was lowered to $1 and the youth fare was eliminated as part of a statewide program.

Fares can be paid using cash, a paper transfer, the e-purse or passes on ORCA cards, or the Transit Go smartphone app. Monthly and daily passes are available for ORCA cards, including the PugetPass and inter-agency regional passes. Other forms of contactless payment, including credit and debit cards, are accepted through ORCA card readers onboard buses. From 2020 to 2025, the inspection of fares by Metro personnel was suspended due to the COVID-19 pandemic and later changes in county policy to address racial bias. The fare inspection and enforcement program resumed in March 2025 and consists of uniformed inspectors who board buses and request identification from non-paying passengers; a previous misdemeanor charge for four instances of non-payment was removed.

The King County Metro fares as of June 12, 2026 are:

Type	Fare
Adult	$3.00
Senior (65+) / Disabled / Medicare (Regional Reduced Fare Permit required)	$1
Low-income (Income verified ORCA Lift card required)	$1
Youth (6–18 years)	Free
Children (5 and under)	Free

=== Fare history ===
Metro Transit initially had 38 fare zones that it inherited from its two predecessor operators, with a surcharge of 10 cents per zone crossing. The fare system was overhauled in 1977 and simplified to two zones: one within Seattle and one for the rest of the county. The fare change also introduced a one-hour pass for free transfers—either within the same hour or for a return trip on the same route—and monthly passes.

One-way fare (Peak, 1 Zone), with year of rate change:

- 1973: 20¢
- 1977: 30¢
- 1979: 40¢
- 1980: 50¢
- 1982: 60¢ (
  peak fares
  introduced
  )
- 1985: 65¢
- 1989: 75¢
- 1991: $1.00
- 1993: $1.10
- 1998: $1.25
- 2001: $1.50
- 2008: $1.75
- 2009: $2.00
- 2010: $2.25
- 2012: $2.50
- 2015: $2.75
- 2018: $2.75 (
  peak fares
  discontinued
  )
- 2025: $3.00

== Facilities ==
=== Transit centers and parking ===
While Downtown Seattle is Metro's main transit hub, transit centers act as regional hubs and are served by many bus routes. Some transit centers also offer a park and ride facility. Metro operates out of 25 transit centers located throughout King County, some of which are shared with Sound Transit and other county agencies. Metro maintains 67 park and ride lots that are owned by the agency or leased from another landowner, including the Washington State Department of Transportation and city governments. These lots provide a combined 16,653 parking stalls.

Metro began developing its park and rides in the 1970s using various funding sources, including federal grants. By 1988, it had 37 lots across King County, mostly concentrated on the Eastside, and monitored property crimes with a team of four police officers and hired guards. In the 1980s, Metro proposed co-locating its park and rides with commercial developments to encourage transit-oriented development and attract more riders. In the 2000s, Metro opened its first park and ride garages as well as several lots that were integrated with housing and retail developments.

=== Operations bases and facilities ===
Metro stores and maintains buses at eight bases (garages), spread throughout its 2,134-square-mile (5,530 km^{2}) operating area. In addition to the bases, maintenance of the fleet and operation of the system are supported by several other facilities.

== Security ==
The Metro Transit Police Department is a unit of the King County Sheriff's Office that provides security and law enforcement onboard Metro buses and at the agency's facilities. As of 2026, it has 66 officers out of 89 budgeted positions. Metro also contracts with private firms to provide 270 uniformed and unarmed security guards. Under a former contractor, security guards were trained to not physically intervene in criminal activity. The beating of a teenage girl at Westlake station in January 2010 drew criticism and national attention due to the lack of intervention by security guards present at the scene. In response, Securitas was hired by the county government in April 2010 to provide security services at Metro facilities.

Following the 2024 stabbing of an operator in the University District, Metro proposed the adoption of separate compartments for bus drivers in newer buses that arrived in 2026. The existing sneeze guards installed in 2020 during the COVID-19 pandemic are planned to be replaced on most buses with a heavier barrier. As of 2026, 345 existing buses have been retrofitted with the new barriers.

== Funding ==
The adopted 2025 budget for King County allocated $2.12 billion to Metro for operating and capital expenses related to its transit services. These include non-Metro services that the agency operates on behalf of other agencies. Metro has a total of 2,428 full-time equivalent positions for bus operators. King County Metro is the sole metropolitan county transit agency in Washington and is authorized by the state legislature to collect a sales tax of 0.9 percent across King County. Prior to the 1999 approval of Initiative 695, the agency also collected a motor vehicle excise tax from the state government. The sales tax is Metro's primary funding source, comprising 55.8 percent of anticipated revenue in 2025, followed by contract payments. The agency derives approximately 9 percent of its revenue from fares.

Metro is also contracted to operate bus and train services in exchange for payments. The agency operates some Link light rail and paratransit routes on behalf of Sound Transit, in addition to Sound Transit Express bus routes that primarily serve King County. The Seattle city government provides supplemental funding for routes that pass through the city limits as part of the Seattle Transit Measure, a 0.3 percent city sales tax dedicated to transit purposes that expires after six years but can be renewed by voters. The funding is split between service improvements, late-night service, capital projects for buses, and ORCA card subsidies. The program was established in 2014 with Proposition 1, which was approved in Seattle months after a countywide sales tax increase was defeated by voters and forced Metro to begin service cuts. The Seattle Transit Measure originally used a 0.1 percent sales tax and a $60 motor vehicle excise tax and was renewed in 2020 with a 0.15 percent sales tax. It was renewed in 2026 with an increased sales tax rate.

Bus advertising, primarily in the form of vehicle wraps and banners, comprises a portion of Metro's revenue. The agency prohibits the sale of advertising space for political campaigns and public or social issues. The policy was challenged as a violation of freedom of speech by organizations that had their requests to advertise on Metro buses rejected. A 2016 lawsuit from the American Freedom Defense Initiative was decided in Metro's favor by the Ninth Circuit of Appeals and was declined to be heard by the United States Supreme Court.

=== Operating costs ===
The cost per boarding for Metro was $4.10 in 2005, compared to $2.50 among the country's 15 largest transit agencies and $2.97, the national average. Metro's cost per boarding is 38% above the national average. The cost to operate an hour of bus service rose from $92 in 2002 to $136 in 2012.

Metro's higher-than-average cost per boarding can be at least partially attributed to its high percentage of commuter routes, which run at peak hours only, and often only in one direction at a time. As of 2011, 100 of Metro's 223 routes are peak-only. These routes require significant deadheading (particularly on the one-way routes), as well as a very large part-time labor force, both of which drive up costs.

Metro's lowest-cost route overall, route 4 (East Queen Anne to Judkins Park), had a cost per boarding of only $0.46 during peak hours in 2009. By way of contrast, Metro's peak-only route with the lowest cost per boarding was route 206 (Newport Hills to International School), at $2.04. Metro's highest cost route by this measure, route 149 (Renton Transit Center to Black Diamond), had a peak time cost of $34.47 per boarding. Route 149 serves the rural southeastern corner of King County.

In 2007 it cost $3.64 per boarding to deliver service in the West (Seattle) subarea, $4.79 in the South subarea and $7.27 in the East subarea of King County. At the end of 2008, the systemwide cost per boarding was $3.70.

=== Transit Now ===
In April 2006, King County Executive Ron Sims announced a program entitled "Transit Now" that provided for a 20 percent increase in transit service by the end of 2016 over 2006 service levels, measured in annual operating hours. In order to realize this growth, Transit Now proposed an increase in the local option sales tax for transit of one-tenth of one percent. The Transit Now ordinance, passed by the King County Council on September 5, 2006, and signed by Executive Sims on September 11, 2006, forwarded the tax proposition to the voters and identified the programs to which operating revenue generated from the sales tax increase could be appropriated. The measure was approved by 56.62% of King County voters in the November 2007 general election. The service programs identified in the ordinance are as follows:

1. Implementation of RapidRide routes in five arterial corridors.
2. Increase service on high-ridership routes that provide frequent, two-way connections throughout the agency's service area.
3. Service for growing areas in outlying suburban/[exurban] areas.
4. Partnerships with cities and major employers to provide more service than could otherwise be provided through typical resources.
5. Additional improvements such as expanded ride-share and paratransit services in King County.

== Technology ==
Collaborating with several local jurisdictions, Metro was an early adopter of Transit signal priority (TSP), a system that can extend green lights to allow buses to get through. The system can boost average speeds as much as 8% and is in use on several of the city's busiest corridors, including Aurora Avenue North, Rainier Avenue S and Lake City Way NE. The system uses RFID tags that are read as buses approach a TSP equipped intersection. In 1998, the fleet was updated with an Automatic Vehicle Location (AVL) system that utilizes battery-powered beacons that read the RFID tags and communicate the buses' location to Metro.

In 2010, the AVL system was replaced with a GPS-based system as part of a system-wide radio update. As a part of the radio update Metro also added automated next stop signs and announcements to all buses. Metro's IP network based ITS infrastructure was updated for the debut of its RapidRide service. Buses communicate with roadside equipment using 802.11 wireless technology on the 4.9 GHz public safety band. A fiber optic backhaul connects access points and roadside equipment together to Metro's Communication Center. The system extends the legacy RFID-based TSP system and was also used in conjunction with GPS technology to provide frequent and accurate location updates for next bus arrival signs at RapidRide stations.

Metro began piloting on-board traffic enforcement cameras mounted onto buses on the RapidRide E Line in 2024 to identify drivers in bus lanes on Aurora Avenue in Seattle. The system was designed to complement static cameras that are able to automatically ticket drivers in bus lanes.

=== ORCA card ===
Metro is a participating agency in the regional ORCA card, a fare payment platform that includes a smart card as well as mobile payment. It was launched for public use on April 20, 2009, along with six other transit agencies in the region.

=== Bus stop technology ===
Metro has implemented several intelligent transportation systems (ITS) to provide transit information for customers at bus stops and through online platforms. Transit Watch displays, like those found in airports and major train stations, are installed at some transit centers and transfer points to show real-time bus arrival information. RapidRide stations as well as major bus stops in Downtown Seattle use what Metro calls a "Tech Pylon", a free standing wireless-capable kiosk, that has next bus arrival signs and an ORCA validator for off-board fare payment. A previous pilot project provided bus information displays at stops on Aurora Avenue North in Seattle. Metro discontinued the project in 2005, citing the cost of maintenance and technical problems.

Metro has a regional trip planner that provides itineraries for transit trips within King, Pierce, and Snohomish counties. Google Maps also provides trip planning using schedule data as part of their Google Transit service.

An early project called MyBus by the University of Washington (UW) utilized the tracking data to provide real-time bus information. This is now hosted by Metro under the name Tracker. An improved version of MyBus called OneBusAway, developed by UW graduate students Brian Ferris and Kari Watkins, combines Tracker information with Google Maps. OneBusAway continued to be maintained by the University of Washington Department of Computer Science, until a new nonprofit organization was founded to house and administer it in 2019.

== Fleet ==
As of January 2026, King County Metro operates a total of 1,342 buses, including vehicles assigned for use on Sound Transit Express. The fleet was the fifth-largest among transit agencies in the United States in 2024. The fleet includes a mix of electric trolleybuses, diesel-electric hybrids, and battery electric buses. Buses range in size from 35-foot (11 m) shuttles to 60-foot (18 m), articulated buses on higher-demand routes. The buses are painted in separate colors based on their vehicle type and intended services, with purple reserved for electric trolleybuses and red for RapidRide. The current livery and color scheme was adopted in 2004 and is intended to be replaced in 2025 with the introduction of a larger battery electric fleet.

In 1978, Metro was the first large transit agency in the United States to acquire high-capacity articulated buses (buses with a rotating joint). The agency had attempted to procure articulated buses for several years, but were unsuccessful in finding domestic manufacturers to bid on the order; instead, they turned to German manufacturer MAN to build 150 articulated buses and send them to a AM General plant in Texas for final assembly. The first articulated trolleybus, also built by MAN, entered the fleet in 1987 but were pulled for several months to repair brake issues. Metro has the second-largest fleet of articulated buses in the North America, after the MTA New York City Bus system, and they accounted for 53 percent of all buses used by the agency in 2026. Metro had initially planned to acquire buses with alternative fuel sources, namely liquid natural gas and liquid propane, until their cost and feasibility ruled them out. A fleet of dual mode buses, manufactured by Breda in Italy, was ordered for use in the Downtown Seattle Transit Tunnel; they used electric trolley wire inside the tunnel and diesel fuel elsewhere. Metro's first hybrid buses with electric batteries were manufactured by New Flyer Industries and replaced the Breda fleet inside the transit tunnel in 2004.

All buses in the Metro fleet are accessible with level boarding or lifts, boarding ramps, and kneeling. In 1979, the agency ordered some of the first hydraulic wheelchair lifts for American buses; they were installed onto new buses and later retrofitted into existing ones. Metro had already ordered 252 new buses with another lift type that was later found to be flawed in a trial conducted a year earlier. Half of the fleet was equipped with wheelchair lifts by 1984, but many were replaced due to faults and safety issues by the end of the decade. Metro's entire fleet has been wheelchair-accessible since 1999 and all new buses have been low-floor with ramps instead of lifts since their introduction in 2002. The low-floor buses were also the first Metro buses to have air conditioning. The final high-floor buses, which were also the last to be solely powered by diesel fuel, were retired in October 2020. Some of the agency's retired buses have been preserved and restored by the Metro Employees Historic Vehicle Association, a nonprofit organization of Metro drivers and alumni formed in 1981. The organization operates heritage bus tours and excursions in Seattle and the surrounding area, including trolleybuses on the network.

== See also ==
- Eclipse (dog)
