= Josiah Merritt =

Early American Pioneer

Josiah Merritt (1803–1882), sometimes known as "Uncle Si", was an early pioneer of the Pacific Northwest. Mount Si and Little Si near North Bend, Washington were named in his honor.

Merritt was born in New Jersey in 1803.

Merritt built a cabin at the base of the Mt. Si in 1860. He raised vegetables and hogs and kept an orchard. According to local historians, he was a rugged man who sometimes hauled bacon to the large settlements. "He had a native American wife but when his legitimate spouse, 'Aunt Sally' as the settlers called her, arrived from the east, the native woman had to go back to her people". He was known for playing the fiddle.

Merritt died in February 1882 and was buried in the Old Fall City Cemetery in Fall City, King County, Washington.
