= Mount Kent (Washington) =

Mountain in Washington (state), United States

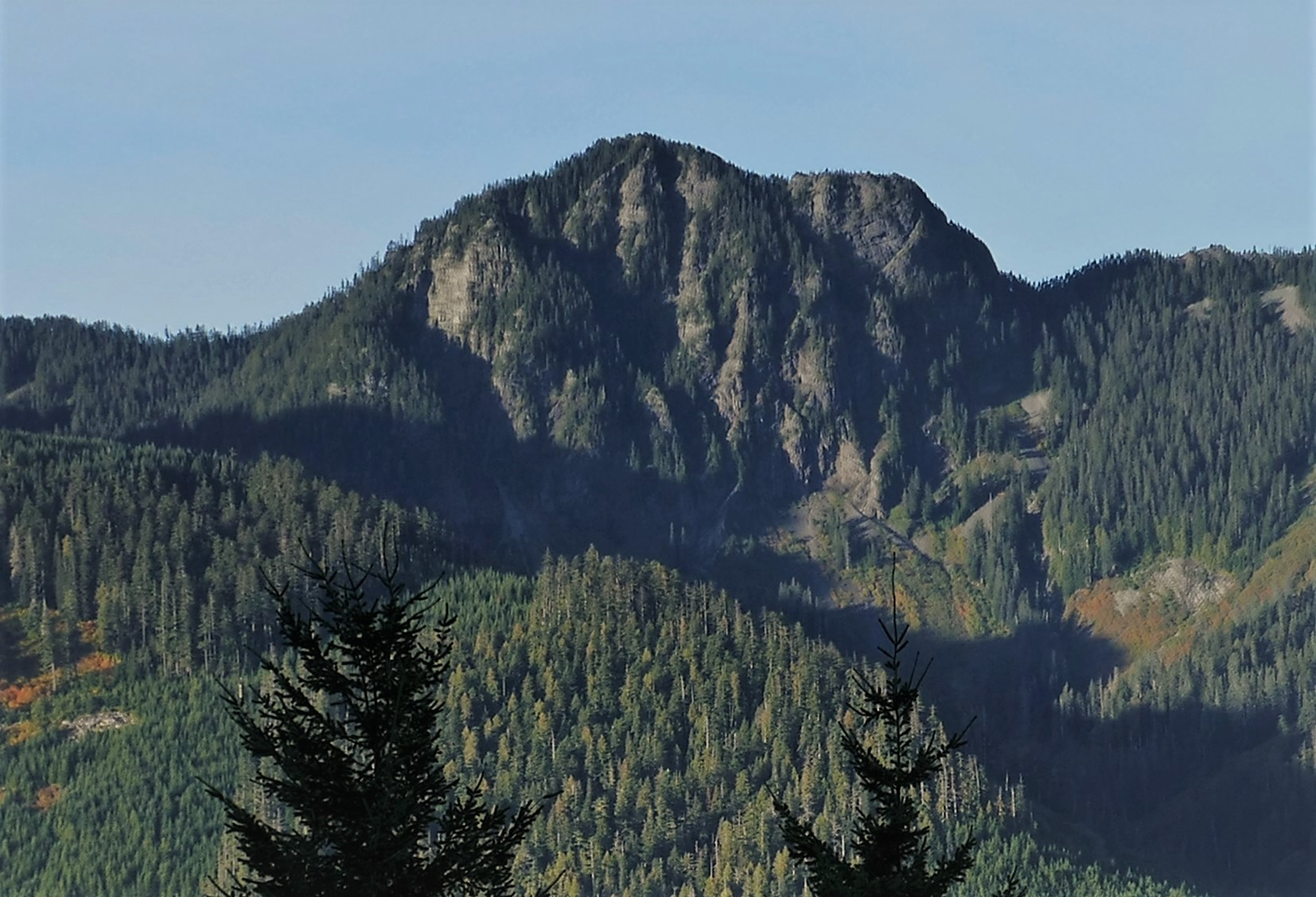
- Mount Kent, north aspect

Highest point
- Elevation: 5,087 ft (1,551 m)
- Prominence: 647 ft (197 m)
- Parent peak: McClellan Butte (5,162 ft)
- Isolation: 1.15 mi (1.85 km)
- Coordinates: 47°23′25″N 121°37′04″W

Geography
- Location within Washington (state) Location within the United States
- Country: United States
- State: Washington
- County: King
- Parent range: Cascade Range
- Topo map: USGS Bandera

Climbing
- Easiest route: class 3 scrambling

Mount Kent is a 5,087-foot (1,551-metre) mountain summit located in east King County of Washington state. It's part of the Cascade Range and is situated on land managed by Mount Baker-Snoqualmie National Forest. Precipitation runoff on the mountain drains north into Alice Creek, a tributary of the South Fork Snoqualmie River. The nearest higher neighbor is McClellan Butte, 1.16 mi (1.87 km) to the north, and Mount Defiance is set 4 mi (6.4 km) to the northeast across the Interstate 90 corridor.

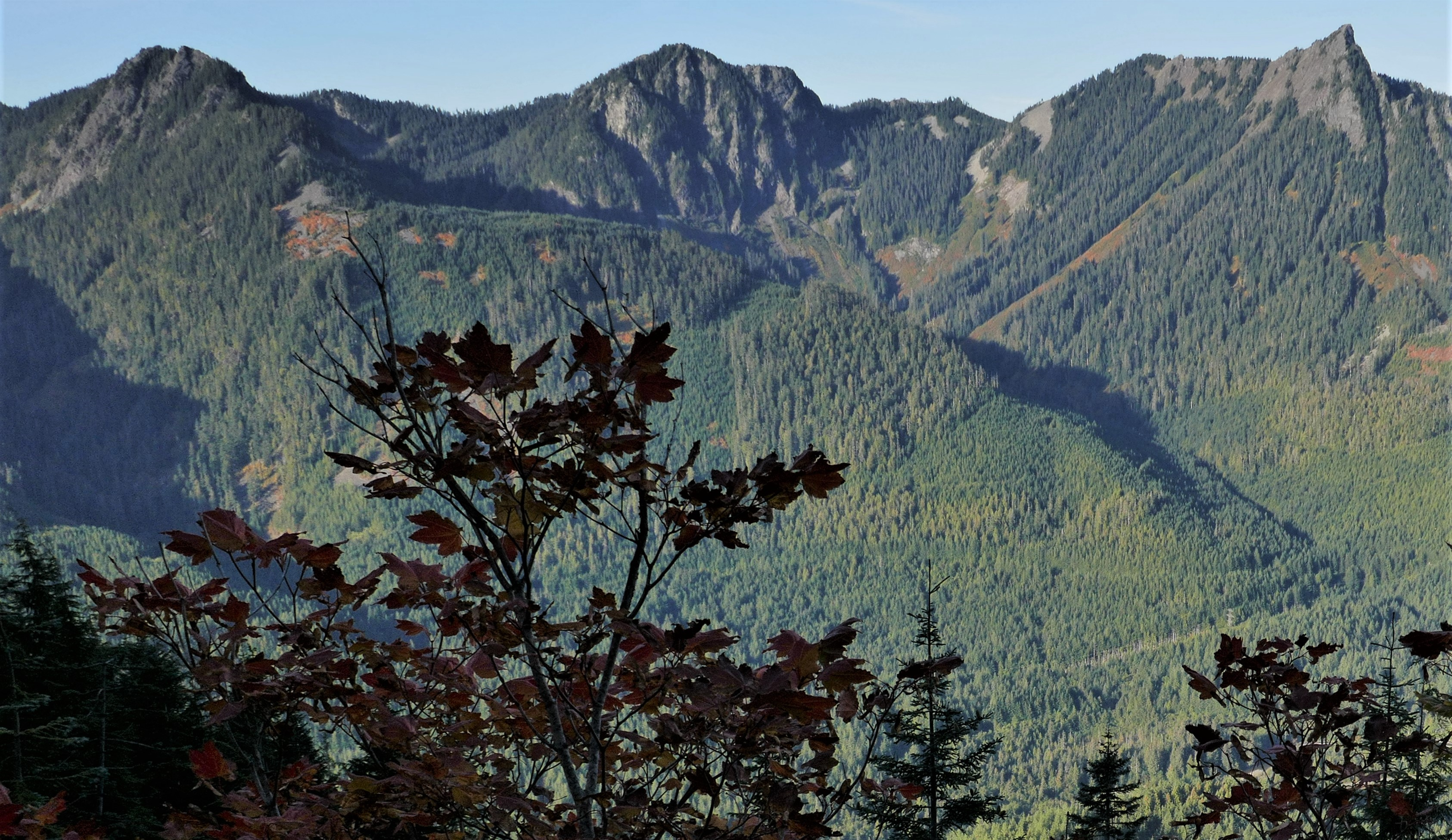
Mt. Kent centered, McClellan Butte right

== Climate ==
Mount Kent is located in the marine west coast climate zone of western North America. Weather fronts originating in the Pacific Ocean travel northeast toward the Cascade Mountains. As fronts approach, they are forced upward by the peaks of the Cascade Range, causing them to drop their moisture in the form of rain or snow onto the Cascades (Orographic lift). As a result, the west side of the Cascades experiences high precipitation, especially during the winter months in the form of snowfall. Because of maritime influence, snow tends to be wet and heavy, resulting in high avalanche danger. During winter months, weather is usually cloudy, but due to high pressure systems over the Pacific Ocean that intensify during summer months, there is often little or no cloud cover during the summer. The months July through September offer the most favorable weather for viewing or climbing this peak.
