= List of King County Metro bus routes =

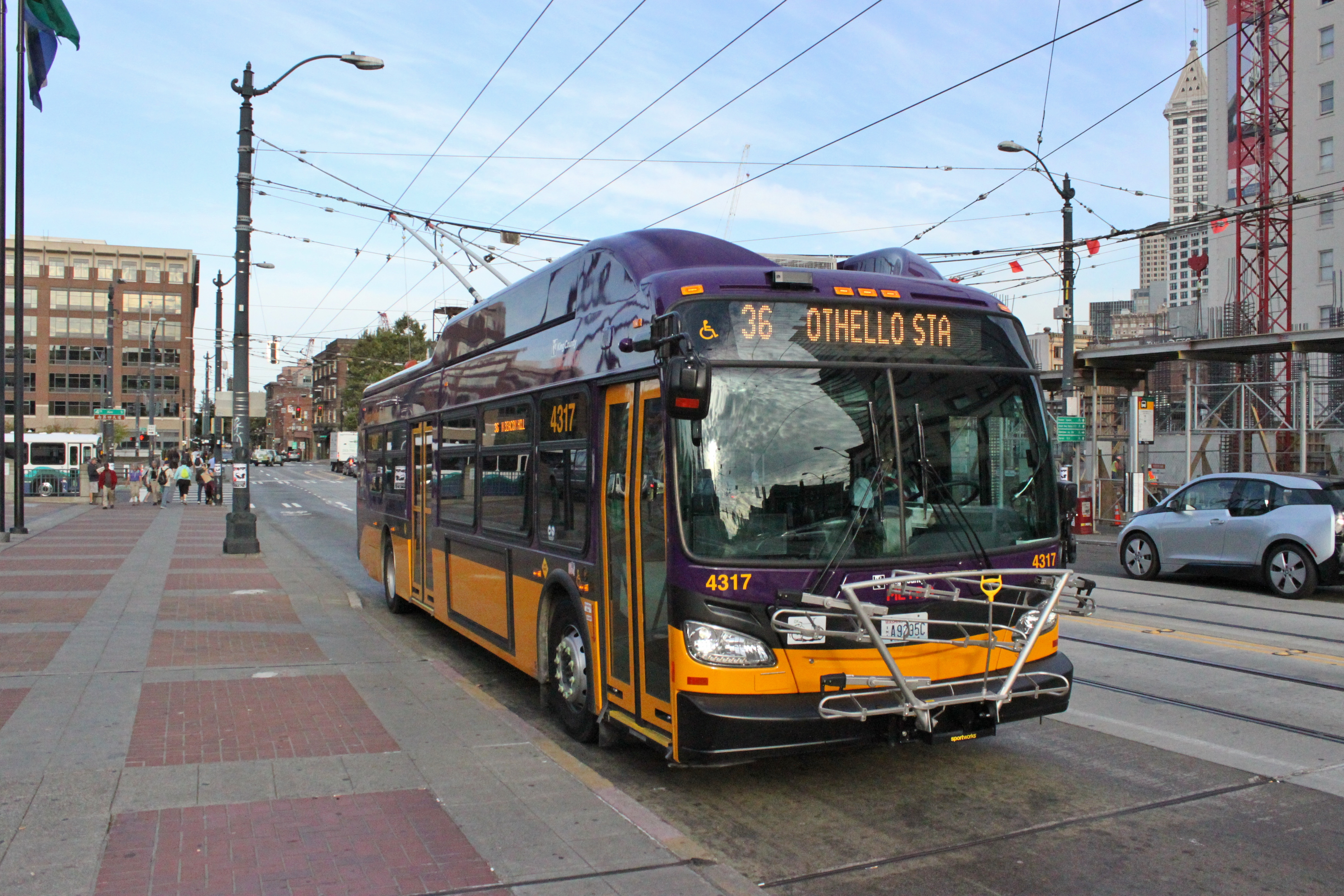
A King County Metro trolleybus on route 36 passing through the International District en route to Othello Station.

This is a list of current routes operated by the mass transit agency King County Metro in the Greater Seattle area. It includes routes directly operated by the agency, routes operated by contractors and routes operated by King County Metro under contract with another agency. Routes are organized by route number (or letters in the case of RapidRide). Discontinued routes and former versions of existing routes are not listed.

These lists reflect the September 2026 service change.

== RapidRide ==
King County Metro's RapidRide lines are designated by letters. RapidRide routes also have a numerical designation in the range 671-678, but this is not displayed to passengers.

Route	Start	Via	End	Night Owl	Links
A Line	Tukwila International Blvd Station	Pacific Highway S (State Route 99), SeaTac, Sea–Tac Airport, Des Moines, Highline College, Kent, Redondo Heights P&R, Federal Way	Federal Way Downtown Station	Yes	Schedule; Map
B Line	Downtown Redmond Station	Redmond, Overlake, Overlake Transit Center, Overlake P&R, Crossroads, Bellevue	Bellevue Transit Center	No	Schedule; Map
C Line	South Lake Union	Downtown Seattle, West Seattle, Alaska Junction, Morgan Junction, Fauntleroy Ferry Terminal	Westwood Village	Yes	Schedule; Map
D Line	Crown Hill	Ballard, Interbay, Uptown, Belltown	Downtown Seattle	Yes	Schedule; Map
E Line	Aurora Village Transit Center	Aurora Ave N, Shoreline, Bitter Lake, Licton Springs, Greenwood, West Green Lake, North Fremont, East Queen Anne, Westlake, Belltown	Downtown Seattle	Yes	Schedule; Map
F Line	Burien Transit Center	Burien, SeaTac, Tukwila, Tukwila International Boulevard Station, Southcenter Mall, Tukwila Station, Renton, South Renton P&R, Renton Transit Center, Boeing Renton Factory	The Landing (Renton)	No	Schedule; Map
G Line	Downtown Seattle	First Hill, Madison Street	Martin Luther King Jr. Way in Madison Valley	Yes	
H Line	Burien Transit Center	Burien, White Center, Delridge, West Seattle	Downtown Seattle	Yes	Schedule; Map

== 1–99 (Seattle) ==
These routes run mostly within the city of Seattle.

- Trolley routes may be operated by electric trolleybuses.
- Conventional routes are not operated by trolleybuses, but are instead operated by diesel, diesel-electric hybrid, or battery-electric buses. All bus routes in other sections of this page are conventional routes.

Route	Type	Off-Peak	Sat	Sun	Night Owl	Start	Via	End	Continues as	Links
1	Trolley	Yes	Yes	Yes	No	Kinnear (West Queen Anne)	Kinnear Park, Seattle Center West (Uptown), Belltown	Downtown Seattle	14	Schedule; Map
2	Trolley	Yes	Yes	Yes	No	West Queen Anne	Queen Anne Ave N, Seattle Center West (Uptown), Belltown, Downtown Seattle, First Hill, E Union St, Central District, Madrona	Madrona Park	13 (Alternating trips from Madrona)	Schedule; Map
3	Trolley	Yes	Yes	Yes	Yes	Summit	Lower Capitol Hill, Downtown Seattle, First Hill, Harborview Medical Center, E Jefferson St, Swedish Hospital Cherry Hill, Central District	Madrona		Schedule; Map
4	Trolley	Yes	Yes	Yes	Yes	Seattle Pacific University (North Queen Anne)	5 Ave N, East Queen Anne, Seattle Center East (Uptown), Belltown, Downtown Seattle, First Hill, Harborview Medical Center, E Jefferson Ave, Swedish Hospital Cherry Hill, Central District	Judkins Park		Schedule; Map
4 Shuttle	Trolley	Yes	No	No	No	Cherry Hill		Judkins Park		Schedule; Map
5	Conventional	Yes	Yes	Yes	No	Shoreline Community College	Shoreline, Greenwood Ave N, Bitter Lake, Greenwood, Phinney Ridge, Phinney Ave N, Woodland Park Zoo, North Fremont, Aurora Ave N, East Queen Anne, Westlake, Belltown	Downtown Seattle	21	Schedule; Map
7	Trolley	Yes	Yes	Yes	Yes	Downtown Seattle	S Jackson St, International District, Rainier Ave S, Mount Baker Transit Center, Rainier Valley, Columbia City	Rainier Beach		Schedule; Map
8	Conventional	Yes	Yes	Yes	No	Seattle Center (Uptown)	Denny Way, Capitol Hill, Capitol Hill Station, Group Health Hospital, Martin Luther King Junior Way, Madison Valley, Central District	Mount Baker Transit Center		Schedule; Map
9 Express	Conventional	No	No	No	No	Capitol Hill	Broadway, Seattle Central College, First Hill, Rainier Valley, Columbia City, Rainier Beach	Rainier Beach Station		Schedule; Map
10	Trolley	Yes	Yes	Yes	No	Downtown Seattle	Summit, Capitol Hill Station, Group Health Hospital, 15th Ave E	Capitol Hill		Schedule; Map
11	Conventional	Yes	Yes	Yes	No	Downtown Seattle	Capitol Hill, Seattle Central College, E Madison St, Central District, Madison Valley	Madison Park		Schedule; Map
12	Trolley	Yes	Yes	Yes	No	Downtown Seattle	First Hill, Swedish Medical Center, Seattle University, 19th Ave E, Group Health Hospital	Interlaken Park (Capitol Hill)		Schedule; Map
13	Trolley	Yes	Yes	Yes	No	Seattle Pacific University (North Queen Anne)	Queen Anne Ave N, Seattle Center West (Uptown), Belltown	Downtown Seattle	2 (Downtown-Madrona)	Schedule; Map
14	Trolley	Yes	Yes	Yes	No	Downtown Seattle	S Jackson St, International District, Central District, 31 Ave S, Mount Baker Transit Center	Mount Baker	1	Schedule; Map
17 Express	Conventional	No	No	No	No	Sunset Hill	32nd Ave NW, Ballard	Downtown Seattle		Schedule; Map
21 Local	Conventional	Yes	Yes	Yes	No	Downtown Seattle	SODO, West Seattle, 35th Ave SW, High Point, Gatewood	Westwood Village	5	Schedule; Map
21 Express	Conventional	No	No	No	No	Downtown Seattle	Alaskan Way Viaduct, West Seattle, 35th Ave SW, High Point, Gatewood	Arbor Heights		Schedule; Map
22	Conventional	Yes	No	No	No	Alaska Junction	West Seattle, Morgan Junction, Gatewood, Westwood Village	Arbor Heights		Schedule; Map
24	Conventional	Yes	Yes	Yes	No	West Magnolia	Discovery Park, W Viewmont Way, Central Magnolia, 34th Ave W, 28th Ave W, Smith Cove Cruise Terminal (Pier 91), Seattle Center, Belltown	Downtown Seattle	124	Schedule; Map
27	Conventional	Yes	Yes	Yes	No	Downtown Seattle	First Hill, Central District, E Yesler Way, Leschi Park	Colman Park	33 (morning, nights and Sunday)	Schedule; Map
28 Express	Conventional	Yes	Yes	Yes	No	Carkeek Park	8th Ave NW, Crown Hill, East Ballard, West Woodland, North Fremont, Aurora Ave N	Downtown Seattle	131/132	Schedule; Map
31	Conventional	Yes	Yes	No	No	Central Magnolia	East Magnolia, Interbay, Seattle Pacific University, Fremont, Wallingford, University District, University of Washington campus, University Village	Children's Hospital		Schedule; Map
32	Conventional	Yes	Yes	Yes	No	Seattle Center (Uptown)	Interbay, Seattle Pacific University, Fremont, Wallingford, University District, University of Washington campus, University Village	Children's Hospital		Schedule; Map
33	Conventional	Yes	Yes	Yes	No	East Magnolia (Discovery Park)	Smith Cove Cruise Terminal (Pier 91), Seattle Center, Belltown	Downtown Seattle	27 (morning, nights and Sunday)/124 (daytime)	Schedule; Map
36	Trolley	Yes	Yes	Yes	Yes	Downtown Seattle	S Jackson St, Pacific Medical Center, Beacon Hill, Beacon Ave S, Jefferson Park, VA Hospital	Othello Station		Schedule; Map
40	Conventional	Yes	Yes	Yes	No	Northgate Station	North Seattle College, Crown Hill, Loyal Heights, Ballard, Fremont, South Lake Union	Downtown Seattle		Schedule; Map
43	Trolley	Limited	Limited	Limited	No	Downtown Seattle	Capitol Hill, Capitol Hill Station, Group Health Hospital, Central District, Montlake, University of Washington Station, UW Medical Center, University of Washington	University District	44 (certain trips)	Schedule; Map
44	Trolley	Yes	Yes	Yes	Yes	Ballard (Chittenden Locks)	NW Market St, West Woodland, N 45th St, Wallingford, University District, University of Washington, UW Medical Center	University of Washington Station	43 (certain trips)	Schedule; Map
45	Conventional	Yes	Yes	Yes	No	Loyal Heights	NW 85th St, Crown Hill, Greenwood, Green Lake, Roosevelt, Ravenna, University District	University of Washington Station		Schedule; Map
48	Conventional	Yes	Yes	Yes	Yes	University District	University of Washington, UW Medical Center, University of Washington Station, Montlake, 23rd Ave, Central District	Mount Baker Transit Center		Schedule; Map
49	Trolley	Yes	Yes	Yes	Yes	University District	10th Ave E, Capitol Hill, Broadway, Seattle Central Community College	Downtown Seattle		Schedule; Map
50	Conventional	Yes	Yes	Yes	No	Alki Point	Admiral District, Alaska Junction, SODO, SODO Station, SODO Busway, Beacon Hill, VA Hospital, Columbia City, Seward Park	Othello Station		Schedule; Map
56	Conventional	No	No	No	No	Alki Point	Admiral District, Alaskan Way Viaduct	Downtown Seattle		Schedule; Map
57	Conventional	No	No	No	No	Alaska Junction	Genesee Hill, Admiral District, Alaskan Way Viaduct	Downtown Seattle		Schedule; Map
60	Conventional	Yes	Yes	Yes	No	Capitol Hill	Broadway, Seattle Central College, First Hill, Seattle University, Swedish Medical Center, Harborview Medical Center, Pacific Medical Center, Beacon Hill Station, Georgetown, Olson/Myers P&R, White Center	Westwood Village		Schedule; Map
61	Conventional	Yes	Yes	Yes	No	Lake City	Meadowbrook, Northgate Station, Licton Springs	Greenwood		
62	Conventional	Yes	Yes	Yes	No	Downtown Seattle	Belltown, South Lake Union, Dexter Ave N, Fremont, Wallingford, Green Lake, NE 65th St, Roosevelt, Ravenna, Bryant, Magnuson Park	Sand Point		Schedule; Map
65	Conventional	Yes	Yes	Yes	Yes	Shoreline South/148th Station	Lake City, 35th Ave NE, Wedgwood, Bryant, Children’s Hospital, University Village, University of Washington, University of Washington Station	University District	67	Schedule; Map
67	Conventional	Yes	Yes	Yes	Yes	Northgate Station	Roosevelt Way NE, Maple Leaf, Roosevelt, University District, University of Washington, University of Washington Station	Children's Hospital	65	Schedule; Map
70	Trolley	Yes	Yes	Yes	Yes	University District	Eastlake Ave E, Eastlake, Fairview Ave N, South Lake Union	Downtown Seattle		Schedule; Map
72	Conventional	Yes	Yes	Yes	Yes	University District	University Village, Ravenna, Wedgwood, Lake City	Shoreline South/148th Station		Schedule; Map
75	Conventional	Yes	Yes	Yes	No	Northgate Station	Northgate, Lake City, Matthews Beach, Sand Point, View Ridge, Windermere, Children's Hospital, University Village, University of Washington	University District	77	Schedule; Map
77	Conventional	Yes	Yes	Yes	Yes	Bitter Lake	Haller Lake, Pinehurst Station, Lake City, Roosevelt, Ravenna, University District, University of Washington	Children's Hospital	77	Schedule; Map
79	Conventional	Yes	No	No	No	Green Lake P&R	Roosevelt, Wedgwood, View Ridge, Hawthorne Hills, Windermere, Ravenna	University District		Schedule Map

=== Route 90 (Snow Shuttle) ===
Route 90 operates when snow routes are in effect in the Central Seattle area, and when the Emergency Service Network has been activated due to severe weather. Route 90 buses travel between Downtown Seattle and First Hill, via Capitol Hill, serving all marked stops along the route from approximately 5:30 a.m. to 11:30 p.m.

=== Route 96 & 98 (Seattle Streetcar) ===
Route	Off-Peak	Sat	Sun	Name	Start	Via	End	Links
96	Yes	Yes	Yes	First Hill Streetcar	Pioneer Square	King Street Station, Chinatown-International District, Central District, Yesler Terrace, First Hill, Swedish Medical Center, Seattle University, Seattle Central College	Capitol Hill (Link Station)	Information
98	Yes	Yes	Yes	South Lake Union Streetcar	Downtown Seattle (Westlake Hub)	South Lake Union, Lake Union Park	Fred Hutchinson Cancer Research Center	Information

=== Link Shuttles ===
King County Metro operates Link shuttle routes when service on Sound Transit's Link Light Rail is suspended for a prolonged period of time. Shuttles for the 1 Line operate as Route 97 and shuttles for the 2 Line operate as Route 92. If the entire line is closed, Link shuttle buses emulate trains, stopping at every Station along the line. If only a section of the line is closed, these buses serve as a "bus bridge" shuttling passengers between the operating sections of the line and stopping near intermediate Stations on the closed section of the line, in the case of a multi-Station closure. Limited stop shuttles may also be operated in the case of a multi-Station closure.

== 100s (South King County) ==
Routes in the 100 series primarily serve destinations in South King County and on Vashon Island.

Route	Off-Peak	Sat	Sun	Night Owl	Start	Via	End	Links
101	Yes	Yes	Yes	No	Downtown Seattle	SODO, SODO Busway, I-5, Renton Transit Center	South Renton P&R	Schedule; Map
102	No	No	No	No	Downtown Seattle	SODO, SODO Busway, I-5, South Renton P&R	Fairwood	Schedule; Map
105	Yes	Yes	Yes	No	Renton Transit Center	Renton Technical College	Renton Highlands	Schedule; Map
106	Yes	Yes	Yes	Yes	International District/Chinatown Station	Rainier Ave S, Mount Baker Transit Center, Martin Luther King Junior Way S, Columbia City, Rainier Valley, Rainier Beach Station, Skyway	Renton Transit Center	Schedule; Map
107	Yes	Yes	Yes	Yes	Beacon Hill Station	Georgetown, South Beacon Hill, Rainier Beach Station, Rainier Beach, Lake Ridge, Bryn Mawr	Renton Transit Center	Schedule; Map
111	Yes	Yes	Yes	No	South Bellevue Station	Newport Hills P&R, Kennydale, Renton Highlands P&R	Renton Highlands	Schedule; Map
113	No	No	No	No	Downtown Seattle	Federal Center South, Olson/Meyers P&R, White Center Transfer Point	Shorewood	Schedule; Map
118	Yes	Yes	Yes	No	Vashon Island Ferry Terminal	Vashon Heights, Vashon, Ober Park P&R, Valley Center P&R,	Tahlequah Ferry Terminal	Schedule; Map
119	Yes	No	No	No	Vashon Island Ferry Terminal	Vashon Heights, Vashon, Ober Park P&R, Valley Center P&R, Ellisport, Maury Island	Dockton	Schedule; Map
121	No	No	No	No	Downtown Seattle	Federal Center South	Burien Transit Center	Schedule; Map
124	Yes	Yes	Yes	Yes	Downtown Seattle	SODO, Georgetown, Boeing Field, Riverton Heights, McMicken Heights	Tukwila International Blvd Station Sea–Tac Airport (night owl trips)	Schedule; Map
125	Yes	Yes	Yes	No	Downtown Seattle	Delridge, South Seattle College	Westwood Village	Schedule; Map
128	Yes	Yes	Yes	No	Admiral District	Alaska Junction, Morgan Junction, Delridge, South Seattle College (weekdays), White Center, Cascade Behavioral Hospital, Riverton Heights, Tukwila International Blvd Station	Southcenter	Schedule; Map
131	Yes	Yes	Yes	No	Downtown Seattle	4th Ave S, SODO, Highland Park	Burien Transit Center	Schedule; Map
132	Yes	Yes	Yes	No	Downtown Seattle	4th Ave S, SODO, South Park, Boulevard Park, Riverton Heights	Burien Transit Center	Schedule; Map
148	Yes	Yes	Yes	No	Renton Transit Center	South Renton P&R, Royal Hills	Fairwood	Schedule; Map
150	Yes	Yes	Yes	Yes	Downtown Seattle	SODO, SODO Busway, I-5, Tukwila P&R, Southcenter, Boeing Kent, Regional Justice Center	Kent Station	Schedule; Map
153	Yes	No	No	No	Kent Station	East Valley Road, South Renton P&R	Renton Transit Center	Schedule; Map
156	Yes	Yes	Yes	No	Highline College	Des Moines, Sea-Tac, Sea-Tac Airport Station, McMicken Heights	Southcenter	Schedule; Map
160	Yes	Yes	Yes	Yes	Auburn Station	Auburn Way N, Kent Station, Kent East Hill, Valley Medical Center, South Renton P&R	Renton Transit Center	Schedule; Map
161	Yes	Yes	Yes	Yes	Kent Station	Kent Industrial Valley, Sea-Tac Airport	Burien Transit Center	Schedule; Map
164	Yes	Yes	Yes	No	Green River College	Northeast Auburn, Lake Meridian, Kent Station	Kent Des Moines Station	Schedule; Map
166	Yes	Yes	Yes	No	Burien Transit Center	Highline College, Des Moines, Normandy Park	Kent Des Moines Station	Schedule; Map
168	Yes	Yes	Yes	No	Kent Station	Lake Meridian P&R	Maple Valley	Schedule; Map
181	Yes	Yes	Yes	No	Twin Lakes P&R	The Commons at Federal Way, Downtown Federal Way Staton, Supermall, Auburn Station	Green River College	Schedule; Map
182	Yes	Yes	Yes	No	Downtown Federal Way Staton	The Commons at Federal Way, South Federal Way	Northeast Tacoma (crosses into Pierce County)	Schedule; Map
183	Yes	Yes	Yes	No	Downtown Federal Way Staton	Camelot, Star Lake P&R	Kent Station	Schedule; Map
184	Yes	Yes	Yes	No	Auburn Station	Southeast Auburn	Southeast Auburn	Schedule; Map
187	Yes	Yes	Yes	No	Downtown Federal Way Staton	S 320th St, SW 320th St	Twin Lakes	Schedule; Map
193 Express	No	No	No	No	First Hill Express	Providence Medical Center, Harborview Hospital, Swedish Hospital, Virginia Mason Hospital, Tukwila P&R, Kent-Des Moines P&R, Star Lake P&R	Federal Way Downtown Station	Schedule; Map

== 200s (East King County) ==
Routes in the 200s primarily serve East King County.

Route	Off-Peak	Sat	Sun	Night Owl	Start	Via	End	Links
203	Yes	Yes	Yes	No	South Bellevue Station	Factoria, Newport Way, Issaquah Transit Center	Issaquah Highlands P&R	Schedule; Map
204 DART	Yes	Yes	Yes	No	North Mercer Island	Island Crest Way	South Mercer Island	Schedule; Map
215	Yes	Yes	Yes	No	North Bend	Snoqualmie Ridge, Issaquah, Issaquah Highlands P&R, Eastgate Freeway Station	Mercer Island Station	Schedule; Map
218	No	No	No	No	Issaquah Highlands P&R	Eastgate Freeway Station	Mercer Island Station	Schedule; Map
220	Yes	Yes	Yes	No	Eastgate P&R	Bellevue College, Lake Hills	Bellevue Transit Center	Schedule; Map
222	Yes	Yes	Yes	No	Redmond Technology Station	Overlake, Downtown Redmond Station, Education Hill	Cottage Lake	Schedule; Map
223	Yes	Yes	Yes	No	Eastgate P&R	Bellevue College, Crossroads, Overlake P&R, Redmond Transit Center	Downtown Redmond Station	Schedule; Map
224 DART	Yes	No	No	No	Duvall	Redmond Ridge, NE Novelty Hill Rd, Bear Creek, Downtown Redmond Station	Redmond Transit Center	Schedule; Map
225	Yes	Yes	Yes	No	Kenmore P&R	Finn Hill, Kingsgate P&R, Totem Lake Transit Center, 132nd Ave NE	Overlake P&R	Schedule; Map
226	Yes	Yes	Yes	No	South Bellevue Station	Overlake, Crossroads, Lake Hills, Bellevue College, Eastgate P&R	Bellevue Transit Center	Schedule; Map
230	Yes	Yes	Yes	No	Kirkland Transit Center	Juanita, UW Bothell	Bothell	Schedule; Map
231	Yes	Yes	Yes	No	Kirkland Transit Center	Juanita, Brickyard P&R	Woodinville P&R	Schedule; Map
239	Yes	Yes	Yes	No	Kirkland Transit Center	124th Ave NE, Totem Lake Transit Center, Brickyard P&R	UW Bothell	Schedule; Map
240	Yes	Yes	Yes	No	Bellevue Transit Center	Wilburton P&R, Eastgate P&R, Factoria, Newcastle, Renton Highlands, Boeing Renton Factory	Renton Transit Center	Schedule; Map
245	Yes	Yes	Yes	No	Kirkland Transit Center	Houghton P&R, Redmond, Overlake, Crossroads, Bellevue, Eastgate P&R	Factoria	Schedule; Map
249	Yes	Yes	Yes	No	Overlake Transit Center	West Lake Sammamish Pkwy NE, Sammamish Viewpoint Park, Overlake P&R, NE 20th St, South Kirkland P&R, Yarrow Point, Clyde Hill, Medina, Bellevue Transit Center	South Bellevue Station	Schedule; Map
250	Yes	Yes	Yes	No	Bellevue Transit Center	Overlake Medical Center, South Kirkland P&R, Lakeview Dr NE, Kirkland Transit Center, Rose Hill, Redmond Transit Center, Downtown Redmond Station, Bear Creek P&R	Avondale	Schedule; Map
255	Yes	Yes	Yes	No	University District	University of Washington Station, Evergreen Point Freeway Station, Yarrow Point Freeway Station, South Kirkland P&R, 108th Ave NE, Kirkland Transit Center, Juanita	Totem Lake Transit Center	Schedule; Map
256	No	No	No	No	Downtown Seattle	South Lake Union, Evergreen Point Freeway Station, Yarrow Point Freeway Station, Kingsgate P&R, Totem Lake Freeway Station, Brickyard P&R, Woodinville P&R	Woodinville P&R	Schedule; Map
269	Yes	Yes	Yes	No	Mercer Island Station	Eastgate Freeway Station, Issaquah Transit Center, Issaquah Highlands P&R, Issaquah-Pine Lake Rd, South Sammamish P&R, 228th Ave NE, Sahalee Wy NE, Redmond-Fall City Rd, Bear Creek P&R	Marymoor Village Station	Schedule; Map
270	Yes	Yes	Yes	No	Bellevue Transit Center	Medina, Yarrow Point Freeway Station, Evergreen Point Freeway Station	University District	Schedule; Map

== 300s (North King County) ==
Routes in the 300s serve North King County which includes Shoreline, Lake Forest Park, Kenmore, Bothell, Woodinville and Duvall.

Route	Off-Peak	Sat	Sun	Night Owl	Start	Via	End	Links
303	No	No	No	No	Cherry Hill	First Hill, Northgate Station, Echo Lake	Aurora Village Transit Center	Schedule; Map
322	No	No	No	No	First Hill	Midtown, Roosevelt, Lake City, Sheridan Beach, Lake Forest Park	Kenmore P&R	Schedule Map
331	Yes	Yes	Yes	No	Shoreline Community College	Richmond Highlands, Aurora Village Transit Center, Ballinger Terrace, Mountlake Terrace Station, Lake Forest Park, Kenmore P&R, UW Bothell Campus, Cascadia College	Bothell	Schedule; Map
333	Yes	Yes	Yes	No	Shoreline South/148th Station	Shoreline Community College & Library, North City, Ballinger Terrace	Mountlake Terrace Station	
345	Yes	Yes	Yes	No	Northgate Station	North Seattle College, Northwest Hospital, Four Freedoms, Westminster Triangle, Parkwood	Shoreline South/148th Station	Schedule; Map
346	Yes	Yes	Yes	No	Shoreline South/148th Station	Meridian Park	Aurora Village Transit Center	Schedule; Map
348	Yes	Yes	Yes	No	Northgate Station	Jackson Park, Shoreline Community Center & Library, North City	Richmond Beach	Schedule; Map
365	Yes	Yes	Yes	No	Shoreline North/185th Station	5th Ave NE, Shoreline South/148th Station, Haller Lake, Northwest Hospital, North Seattle College	Northgate Station	Schedule; Map

== 400s (Community Transit Commuter - Seattle) ==
Routes in this series are reserved for Community Transit's commuter routes connecting Downtown Seattle and Snohomish County, as well as Pierce Transit route 402.

== 500s (Sound Transit Express) ==
Routes in this series are Sound Transit Express routes with the exception of Pierce Transit routes 500 and 501 serving Federal Way. This list shows the routes Metro operates under contract to Sound Transit, it does not include routes operated by Community Transit or Pierce Transit (who operates some routes solely within King County).

Route	Off-Peak	Sat	Sun	Night Owl	Start	Via	End	Links
522	Yes	Yes	Yes	No	Shoreline South/148th Station	Bothell Way NE, Ballinger Way, Kenmore P&R, UW Bothell/Cascadia College	Woodinville P&R	Schedule; Map
542	Yes	Yes	Yes	No	University District	University of Washington, University of Washington Station, Evergreen Point Freeway Station, Yarrow Point Freeway Station, SR-520 & NE 51st Freeway Station, Redmond Technology Station, Downtown Redmond	Redmond Transit Center	Schedule; Map
545	Yes	Yes	Yes	No	Downtown Seattle	Evergreen Point Freeway Station, Yarrow Point Freeway Station, Overlake Transit Center, SR-520 & NE 51st St Freeway Station, Downtown Redmond, Redmond Transit Center	Bear Creek P&R	Schedule; Map
547 (night route)	Yes (night only)	Yes (night only)	Yes (night only)	Yes	Downtown Seattle	Mercer Island Station, South Bellevue Station, Bellevue Transit Center, Spring District Station, Redmond Technology Station, Downtown Redmond Station	Marymoor Village Station	Schedule; Map
556	Yes	Yes	Yes	No	Bellevue Transit Center	South Bellevue Station, Eastgate Freeway Station, Issaquah Transit Center	Issaquah Highlands P&R	Schedule; Map

== 600s (Community Shuttle and Trailhead Direct) ==
This series of numbers is used for routes considered temporary or experimental. Currently community shuttle routes use these numbers. These routes are operated using Metro owned minibuses, operated by drivers from the non-profit Hopelink and partially funded by the communities they serve. While all routes operate on a fixed route, they also offer a flexible service area where passengers can be picked up and dropped off, if they make a reservation in advance.

The 600s are also used for the Trailhead Direct shuttle system, which runs on weekends and holidays during the spring and summer.

Route	Off-Peak	Sat	Sun	Night Owl	Start	Via	End	Links
630 Community Shuttle	No	No	No	No	Downtown Seattle	First Hill, Harborview Hospital, Swedish Hospital, Virginia Mason Hospital, I-90, Mercer Island P&R, Island Crest Way (flexible service area)	Mercer Island	Schedule; Map
631 Community Shuttle	Yes	Yes	Yes	No	Burien Transit Center	4th Ave SW (southbound only), Gregory Heights (northbound only, flexible service area)	Highline Medical Center	Schedule; Map
635 Community Shuttle	Yes	Yes	No	No	Angle Lake Station	24th Ave S, S 216th St, Wesley Homes (flexible service area), Des Moines	Des Moines Marina District	Schedule; Map

== 700s (West Seattle Water Taxi shuttle) ==
These routes are shuttles connecting neighborhoods West Seattle to the Seacrest Park King County Water Taxi terminal for service to Pier 50 on downtown Seattle's waterfront. They serve all posted bus stops along the route. Although both are classified as DART (Dial-a-Ride Transit) routes, only route 773 has a zone where during weekday mid-day trips buses may deviate from their route. During the winter months (late October to early April) mid-day and weekend service is suspended on the West Seattle Water Taxi and on the shuttle routes.

Routes in the 700s are also used for special event services, such as Washington Huskies football games at Husky Stadium.

Route	Off-Peak	Sat	Sun	Night Owl	Start	Via	End	Links
773 DART	Yes (except winter)	Yes (except winter)	Yes (except winter)	No	Seacrest Park	Harbor Ave SW, SW Avalon Way, 35th Ave SW, SW Alaska St; Weekday mid-day only: Fauntleroy Way SW, Morgan Junction, (DART Zone), California Ave SW	Alaska Junction	Schedule; Map
775 DART	Yes (except winter)	Yes (except winter)	Yes (except winter)	No	Seacrest Park	Clockwise loop along Harbor Ave SW, California Ave SW, SW Admiral Way, 63rd Ave SW and returning to Seacrest Park on Alki Ave SW	Seacrest Park	Schedule; Map

== 800s (Custom & Community Transit Commuter - Northgate ) ==
Both Community Transit and King County Metro operate routes in the 800s, but the numbers used by the two agencies do not overlap. King County Metro assigns custom bus routes serving schools in Bellevue, Kirkland and on Mercer Island route numbers in the 800s. Metro provides one peak trip each school day.

Route	Start	Via	End	Links
893	Totem Lake Transit Center (AM) Lake Washington High School (PM)	Kirkland Transit Center	Lake Washington High School (AM) Forbes Creek (PM)	Schedule; Map
895	Overlake P&R (AM) Lake Washington HS (PM)	W Lake Sammamish Pkwy, NE 40th St	Lake Washington High School (AM) NE 24th St & 173rd Ave NE (PM)	Schedule; Map

== 900s (DART & Custom) ==
Dial-A-Ride-Transit services are assigned route numbers 900-939. Custom bus routes are assigned route numbers from 950-999. The King County Water Taxi uses route numbers 973 and 975. Currently routes serving the private Lakeside School and University Prep in Seattle are assigned route numbers 980-999.

Route	Off-Peak	Sat	Sun	Night Owl	Start	Via	End	Links
902 DART	Yes	Yes	Yes	No	Federal Way Downtown Station	(DART Zone), Mirror Lake	Twin Lakes	Schedule; Map
903 DART	Yes	Yes	Yes	No	Federal Way Downtown Station	(DART Zone), Federal Way Community Center, King County Aquatics Center, South Federal Way	Twin Lakes	Schedule; Map
906 DART	Yes	Yes	Yes	No	Fairwood	Cascade Vista, Valley Medical Center	Southcenter Tukwila Station (weekdays only)	Schedule; Map
907 DART	Yes	No	No	No	Renton Transit Center	Maple Valley	Black Diamond	Schedule; Map
914 DART	Yes	Yes	No	No	Downtown Kent	Kent Station, (DART Zone), Lake Meridian P&R	Kent East Hill	Schedule; Map
915 DART	Yes	Yes	No	No	Auburn Station	Auburn, SR 164, (DART Zone)	Enumclaw Enumclaw High School (weekdays only)	Schedule; Map
917 DART	Yes	Yes	No	No	White River Junction	Pacific, Algona, Outlet Collection Seattle	Auburn Station	Schedule; Map
930 DART	Yes	Yes	Yes	Yes	Kingsgate P&R	NE 132nd St, Willows Rd employment centers (DART Zone), Redmond Civic Center, Downtown Redmond Station	Redmond Town Center	Schedule; Map
931 DART	No	No	No	No	Bothell	UW Bothell/Cascade College campus, (DART Zone), Woodinville, Woodinville P&R, Cottage Lake, English Hill, Redmond	Redmond Transit Center	Schedule; Map
973	No	Partial (Spring and Summer only)	Partial (Spring and Summer only)	No	Seacrest Ferry Dock	Puget Sound	Pier 50	Schedule
975	No	No	No	No	Vashon Ferry Dock	Puget Sound	Pier 50	Schedule
981	No	No	No	No	Lakeside School	Mercer Island P&R, South Bellevue Station, Bellevue, South Kirkland P&R	Houghton P&R	Schedule; Map
982	No	No	No	No	Bear Creek P&R	Overlake Transit Center, Yarrow Point Freeway Station, Evergreen Point Freeway Station, Montlake, University Prep	Lakeside School	Schedule; Map
984	Partial (afternoons only)	No	No	No	Lakeside School	Ravenna, University District, Montlake, Capitol Hill, Central District	International District/Chinatown Station	Schedule; Map
986	No	No	No	No	Houghton P&R	South Kirkland P&R, Medina, Yarrow Point Freeway Station, Evergreen Point Freeway Station, Montlake, University Prep	Lakeside School	Schedule; Map
987	No	No	No	No	Westwood Village	Rainier Valley, Columbia City, Central District, University Prep	Lakeside School	Schedule; Map
988	No	No	No	No	Madrona	Madison Park, Capitol Hill, Montlake, Eastlake, University Prep	Lakeside School	Schedule; Map
989	No	No	No	No	Factoria	Eastgate P&R, Mercer Island P&R	Lakeside School	Schedule; Map
994	No	No	No	No	Downtown Seattle	Lower Queen Anne, Magnolia, Interlay, Ballard, Phinney Ridge, Greenwood, Green Lake, University Prep	Lakeside School	Schedule; Map

== Non-numbered Routes ==
Although some of the following routes have internal route numbers, they do not operate with traditional route numbers displayed on the coach

Route	Off-Peak	Sat	Sun	Start	Via	End	Links
Black Diamond-Enumclaw Community Ride (633)	Yes	No	No	Black Diamond (flexible service area)	SR 169	Enumclaw (flexible service area)	Information
Center Park Bus	Yes	Yes	Yes	Center Park	(any point in King County Metro's service area at customer request)	Center Park	Information
SVT Valley Shuttle (629)	Yes	No	No	Duvall	Carnation, Fall City, Snoqualmie	North Bend	Schedule & Map
Trailhead Direct	Yes	Yes	Yes	Issaquah Transit Center	Margaret's Way Trailhead, Poo Poo Point Trailhead, East Sunset Way Trailhead, Issaquah Highlands P&R	Issaquah Transit Center	Schedule & Map
