= Eclipse (dog) =

Famous bus-riding Seattle dog

- Species: Canis familiaris
- Breed: Black labrador-bull mastiff mix
- Sex: Female
- Died: October 15, 2022; Seattle, Washington, United States
- www.facebook.com/eclipseaRider

Eclipse was a Seattle dog that took herself to a Seattle dog park via King County Metro bus beginning in 2015.

The first time the dog took the bus alone was an accident when she boarded without her owner, who caught up with her on the next bus. He decided to let her ride to the park without him afterwards. Eclipse was required to pay her bus fare like any dog on Metro Transit not held in the lap, and had an ORCA card tied to her collar for payment.

The dog is the subject of a 2016 book, and a rap music video.

On October 15, 2022, Eclipse died at the age of 10. Two days before, she was diagnosed with cancer.

== Sources ==
=== References ===
- Brent, Harry (October 14, 2021). "Dog rides bus by herself every day to play in local park – then takes bus home again". The Irish Post. London, England.
- Glenn, Stacia (December 12, 2018). "'Bus Doggy Dog' is the ultimate ruff-rider". Tacoma News Tribune. Tacoma, Washington.
- Cornwell, Paige (March 7, 2018). "Can your dog take a seat on a King County Metro bus? Yes, but here are the rules". The Seattle Times.
- Stanfield, Laura (October 1, 2016), "Dog on Board: The True Story of Eclipse, the Bus-Riding Dog", School Library Journal (book review)
- "Dog on Board: The True Story of Eclipse, the Bus-Riding Dog", Kirkus Reviews (book review), October 11, 2016
- Gallman, Stephanie (January 13, 2015), Seattle public transit has gone to the dogs, CNN
