= Hopelink =

American nonprofit agency

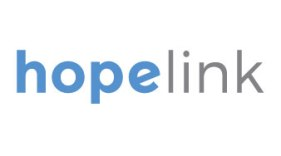

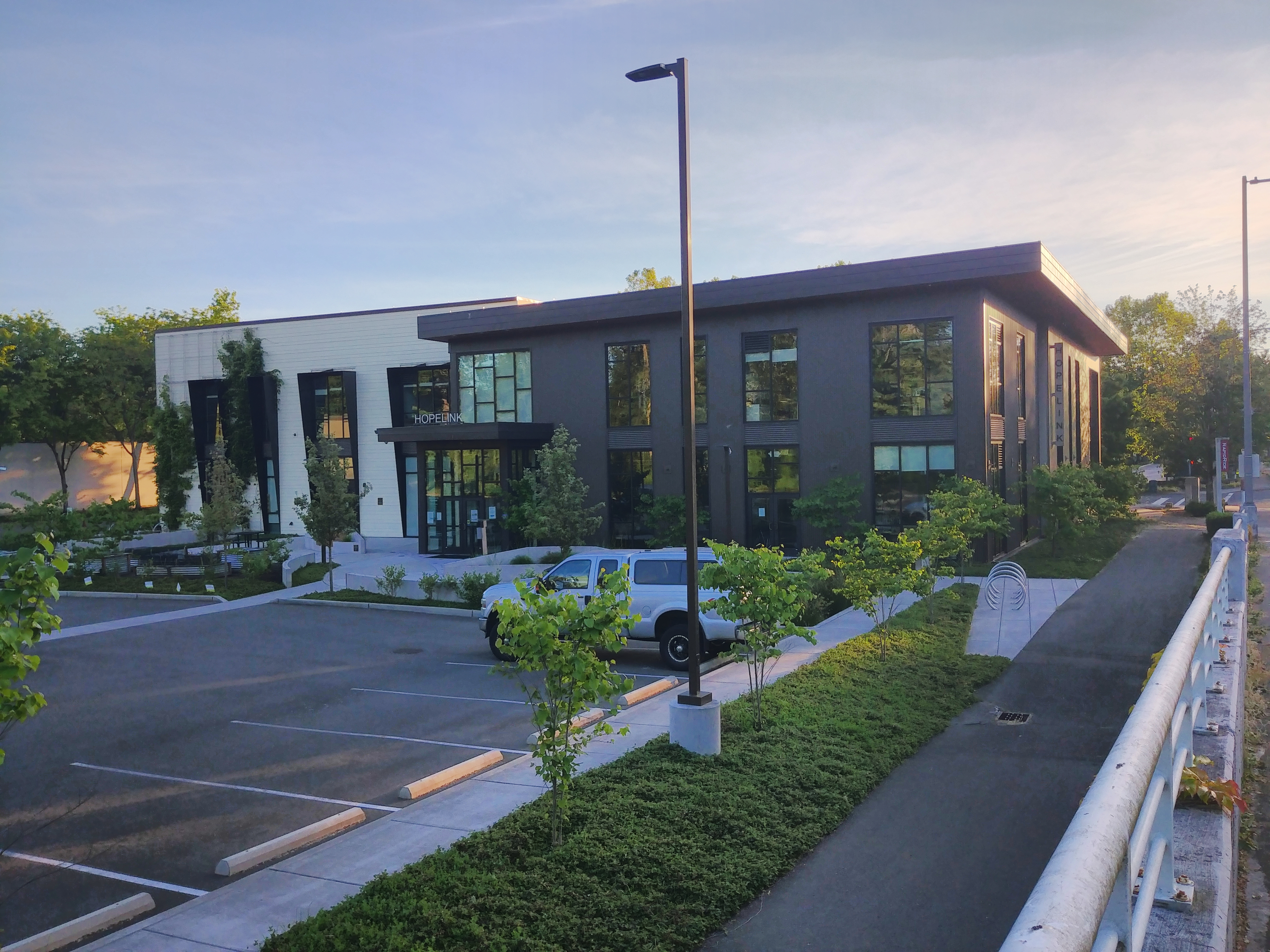
- Hopelink headquarters in Redmond, Washington
- Established: 1971; 55 years ago
- Type: Nonprofit
- Location: Redmond, Washington, U.S.
- Coordinates: 47°40′54″N 122°08′03″W
- Region served: King County, Washington
- Services: Affordable housing, paratransit, adult education, food banks
- CEO: Meghan Altimore
- Budget: $96 million (FY2023)
- Website: Official website

Hopelink is a non-profit organization for social services based in Redmond, Washington, United States. It primarily serves King County and operates programs for low-income residents such as food banks, energy assistance, affordable housing, family development program, transportation, and adult education. Hopelink is one of the largest non-profits in the state of Washington, employing about 275 people with an annual budget of about $96 million. It served 62,500 clients in 2023.

The organization was founded as the Northshore Job Referral Service in April 1971 by volunteers in Bothell to assist unemployed workers following layoffs at Boeing. It was renamed to the Northshore Multi Service Center later that year and expanded to offer services for the elderly, disabled, and low-income residents. Several Multi Service Centers opened around the Eastside region of King County in the 1980s, including homeless shelters and transitional housing. The organization was renamed to Hopelink in 2000.

Hopelink is contracted to provide dial-a-ride paratransit service for King County Metro, the county transit system. The organization also operates Metro's Trailhead Direct, a seasonal shuttle bus service to hiking areas. Hopelink also provides Medicaid transportation for eligible low-income clients.
