= Little Si =

Mountain in Washington (state), United States

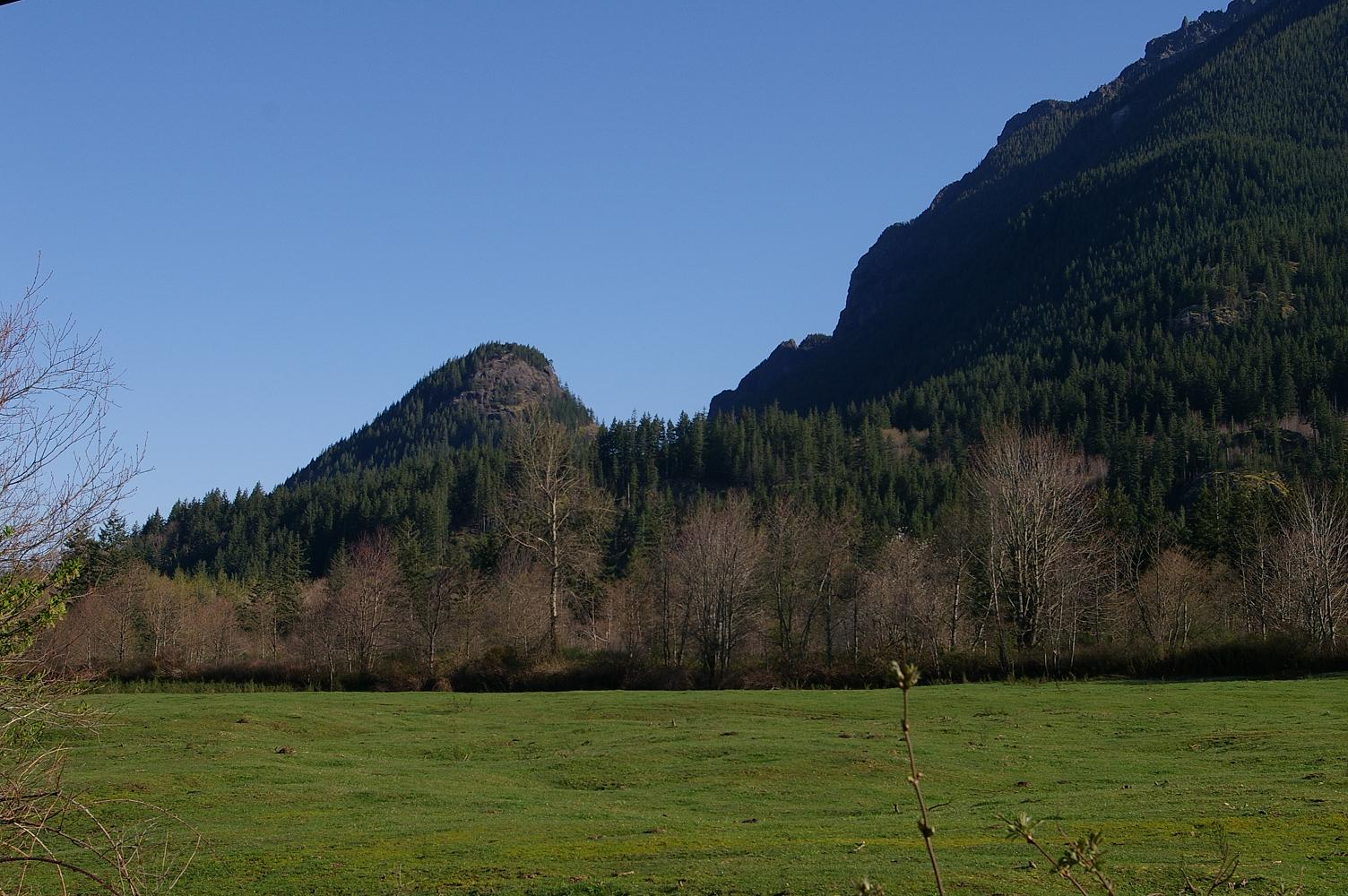
- Little Si from the Southeast. Mt Si to the right.

Highest point
- Elevation: 1,576 ft (480 m) NAVD 88
- Prominence: 460 ft (140 m)
- Coordinates: 47°29′55″N 121°45′22″W

Geography
- Location within Washington (state)
- Location: King County, Washington, U.S.
- Parent range: Cascades
- Topo map: USGS North Bend

Climbing
- Easiest route: Hike

Little Si (pronounced /saɪ/) is a mountain in the US state of Washington, named after its taller neighbor, Mount Si. It has an elevation of 1,576 feet (480 m). and lies on the western margin of the Cascade Range just east of the town of North Bend. Little and Big Si were named after local homesteader Josiah "Uncle Si" Merritt.

Little Si is a distinct mountain peak from Mount Si, with a different trailhead and a valley that separates the two peaks. The Little Si trailhead is at approximately 47°29′14″N 121°45′12″W. Little Si is also known for its rock climbing and bouldering.
