= Mount Si =

Mountain in Washington, United States

- q̓əlbc (Lushootseed)
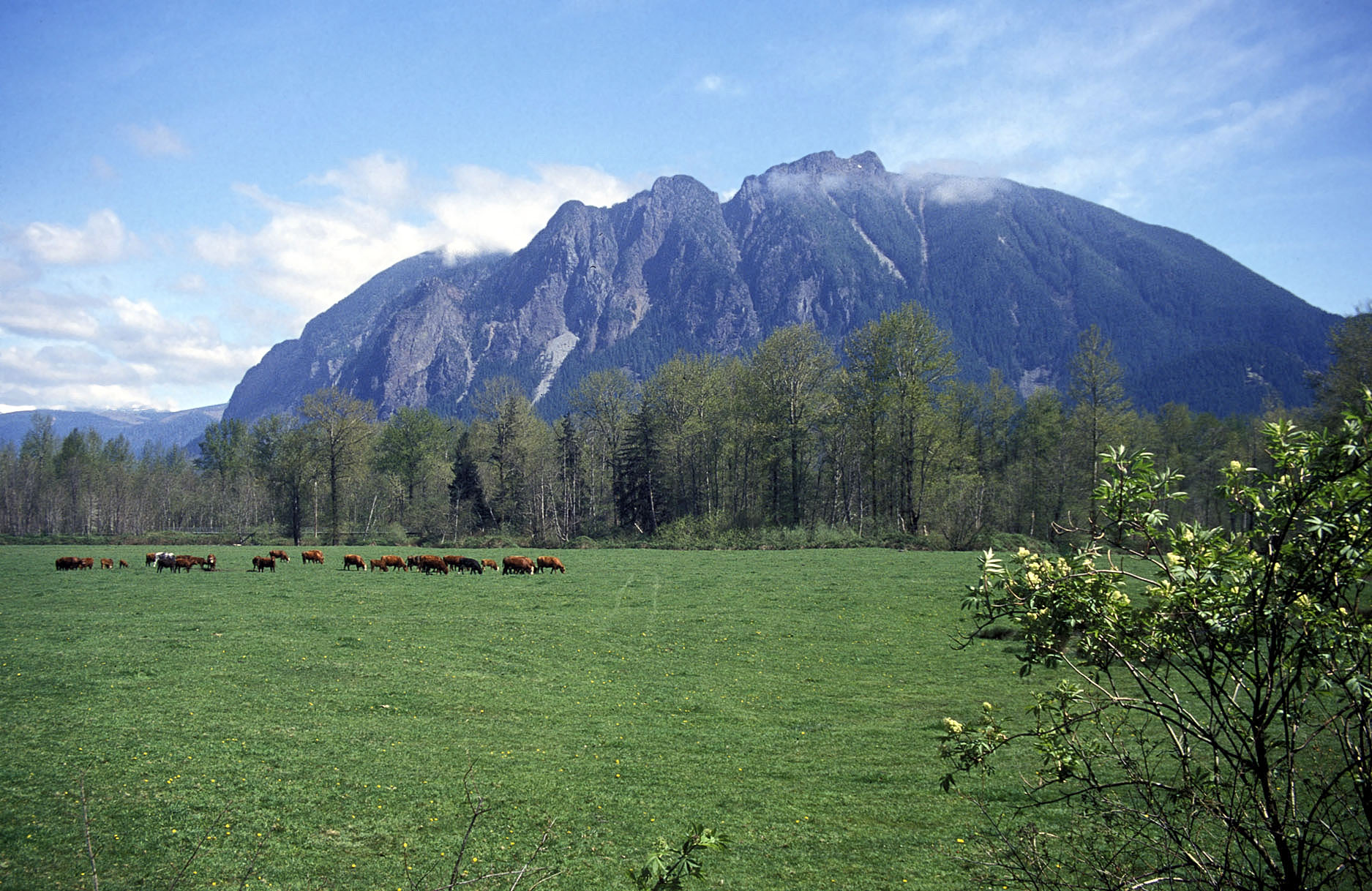
- Mount Si from the southwest

Highest point
- Elevation: 4,167 ft (1,270 m) NGVD 29
- Prominence: 247 ft (75 m)
- Coordinates: 47°30′27″N 121°44′24″W

Geography
- Location within Washington (state) Location within the United States
- Location: King County, Washington, U.S.
- Parent range: Cascades
- Topo map: USGS Mount Si

Geology
- Rock age: Cretaceous to Jurassic
- Mountain type: Oceanic plate volcano
- Last eruption: Cretaceous to Jurassic

Climbing
- Easiest route: Hike and short class 3, scramble

Mount Si (pronounced /saɪ/; Lushootseed: q̓əlbc, CULB-ts) is a mountain in the northwest United States, east of Seattle, Washington. It lies on the western margin of the Cascade Range just above the coastal plains around Puget Sound, and towers over the nearby town of North Bend. Mount Si and neighboring mountain Little Si were named after local homesteader Josiah "Uncle Si" Merritt. The mountain became nationally familiar in the early 1990s by appearing in the opening credits of the television series Twin Peaks, which was filmed in North Bend.

Only about a 45-minute drive from Seattle, the mountain is a favorite outdoor destination for residents of nearby metropolitan areas. Between 80,000 and 100,000 hikers visit the mountain annually. The land is owned by the state of Washington and has been designated a Natural Resources Conservation Area.

The four-mile-long (6.5 km) Mount Si trail vertically climbs 3,500 feet (1,070 m) to the summit ridge. Its summit is reached by an exposed scramble, class 3, up the north side of the summit block, which is known as the "Haystack". In very favorable conditions, it is possible to ski from the summit although the mountain does not usually hold much snow in winter due to its low elevation.

The peak can be accessed by two trails. The Old Mount Si trail is accessed by the Little Si parking lot and the Boulder Garden Loop. It is 0.6 miles (0.97 km) shorter, 270 feet (82 m) steeper in elevation gain, and less crowded than the main trail. The Mount Si trail is accessed by the Mount Si parking lot.

== Geology ==
Mount Si is a remnant of an oceanic plate volcano and the rocks are highly metamorphosed. The rock deposits are a melange including metagabbro, and are Jurassic-Cretaceous in age.

== In Snoqualmie culture ==
Mount Si features prominently in a Prometheus story from the Snoqualmie people. According to Snoqualmie tradition, Mount Si is the fallen body of sɬukʷalb, or Moon, who is the paramount god in Snoqualmie traditional religion. Moon had ordered that a rope of cedar bark be stretched between the Earth and the sky. sbiaw (Coyote) and kay̓kay̓ (Blue Jay) went up the rope, with Blue Jay pecking a hole in the sky for Coyote to crawl through, where he found himself at the bottom of a lake. He transformed into a beaver, but got trapped in a beaver trap set by Moon. Coyote played dead to trick Moon and was brought back to his house, where he was skinned by Moon and his carcass thrown away in the corner, where he waited patiently.

When Moon had fallen asleep, Coyote re-applied his skin and explored the house of Moon, finding great forests, fire, the sun, and a contraption that made daylight among his possessions. Coyote then stole them, transforming back to his regular form and descending back down the rope to distribute what he had stolen across the earth. Awakening to find his possessions stolen, Moon chased Coyote down the cedar rope in anger, but it broke and he fell to his death, forming the mountain. Moon's face is visible on the rocks near the summit.

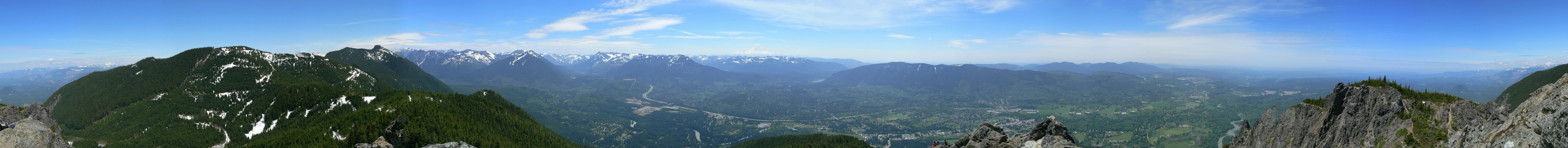
Panorama taken from Haystack
