= Rapid Ride (disambiguation) =

Rapid Ride may refer to:

- RapidRide, a network of limited-stop bus services in King County, Washington
  - RapidRide A Line
  - RapidRide B Line
  - RapidRide C Line
  - RapidRide D Line
  - RapidRide E Line
  - RapidRide F Line
  - RapidRide G Line
  - RapidRide H Line
- Rapid City Rapid Ride, bus service in Rapid City, South Dakota
- Rapid Ride, former limited-stop bus service in Albuquerque, New Mexico
