= RapidRide H Line =

Bus rapid transit route in King County, Washington

H Line

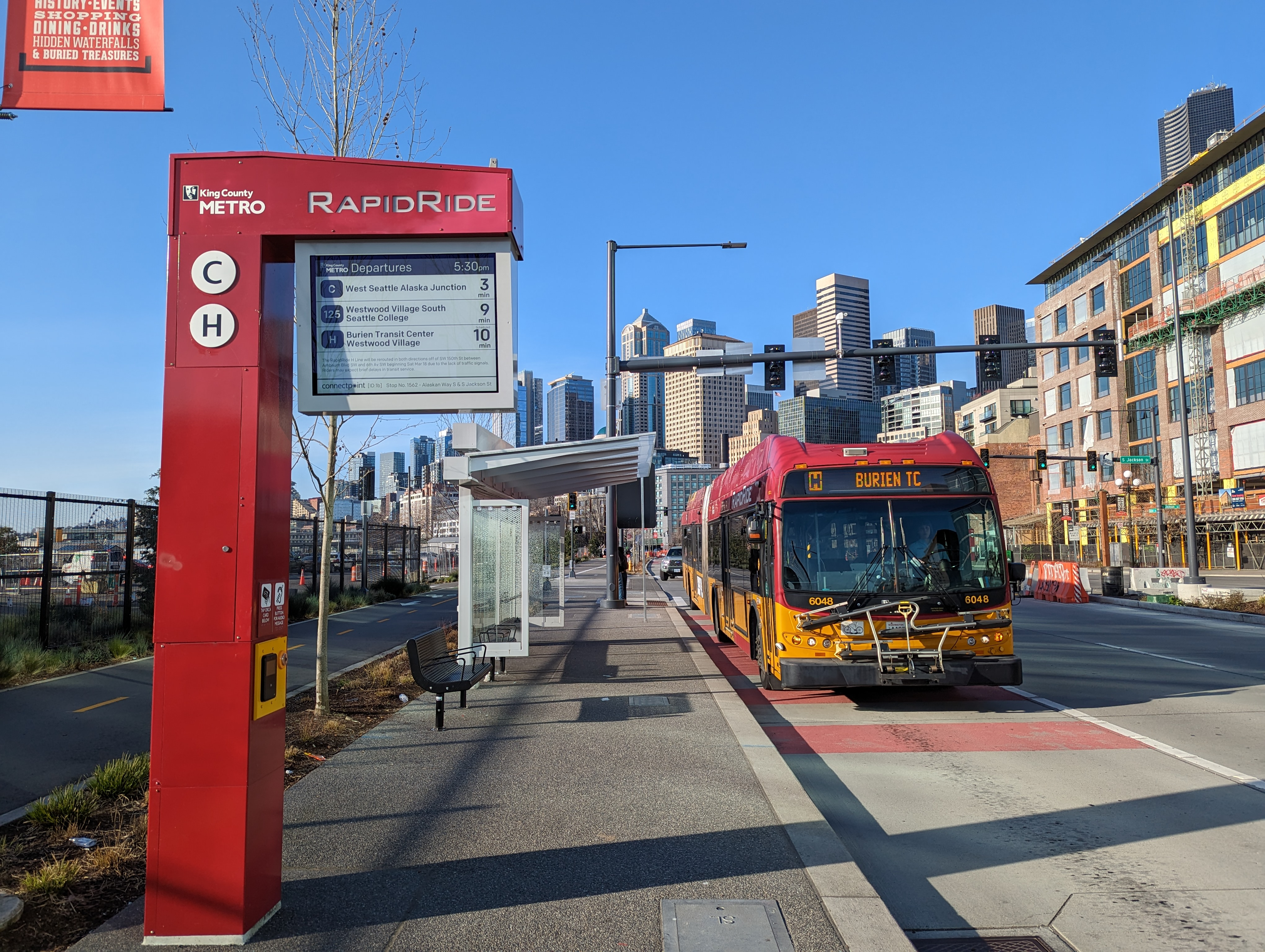
- A southbound H Line bus at South Jackson Street

Overview
- System: RapidRide
- Operator: King County Metro
- Garage: Atlantic Base
- Began service: March 18, 2023
- Predecessors: Route 120

Route
- Locale: King County
- Communities served: Seattle, White Center, Burien
- Start: Downtown Seattle
- Via: Delridge Way SW; Westwood Village; 15th Avenue SW; Ambaum Boulevard SW
- End: Burien Transit Center
- Length: 13 miles (21 km)

Service
- Frequency: Peak: 7 minutes; Off-peak: 15 minutes
- Weekend frequency: 15 minutes (most times)
- Journey time: 49 minutes
- Operates: Weekdays: 4:00 am–2:00 am Weekends: 6:00 am–11:00 pm
- Timetable: kingcounty.gov

The H Line is a RapidRide bus route in Seattle and Burien in King County, Washington, United States. It is operated by King County Metro and incorporates bus rapid transit features, including transit signal priority, exclusive lanes, and off-board fare payment at some stations. Service began on March 18, 2023, replacing Route 120 after the construction of new stations and bus lanes at a cost of $154 million. The 13-mile (21 km) route begins in Downtown Seattle and travels south on Delridge Way and Ambaum Boulevard through West Seattle and White Center before terminating in Burien.

The line runs every 7 minutes during peak hours and 15 minutes off-peak, with service until midnight on weekdays and 11 p.m. on weekends. The H Line is the seventh RapidRide line to open and features stations with digital e-ink screens for real-time arrivals information, ORCA card readers, and larger shelters. It is the first RapidRide line to open under the Move Seattle program, which was funded by a levy approved in 2015.

== History ==
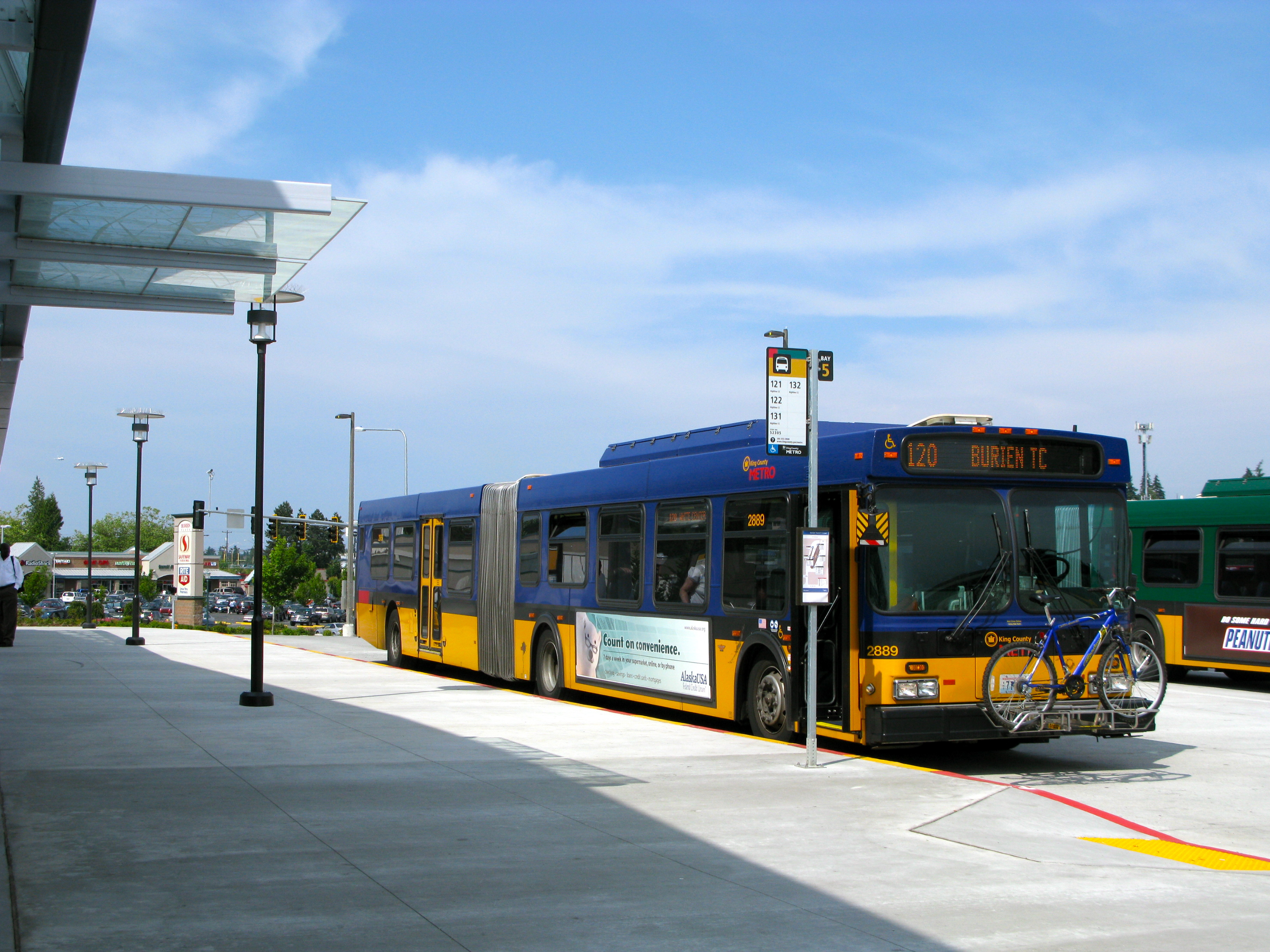
Route 120, the H Line's predecessor, at Burien Transit Center in 2009

The Delridge Way corridor was previously served by King County Metro route 120, which was consistently one of the highest-ridership routes in the system. Prior to the COVID-19 pandemic, Route 120 saw about 9,200 passengers per weekday, and in 2022 ridership fell to 5,300. Development of the route into RapidRide service, alongside other improvements to the corridor, began in late 2017. The planned design would include bus-only lanes, bicycle lanes, and sidewalk improvements along the corridor.

Improvements to bus service include more frequent service, with typical headways of 10 minutes on weekdays; increased wheelchair accessibility at each stop; construction of new sidewalks; and updated pedestrian crossings. Dedicated bus lanes were installed on Delridge Way, and a median was constructed to allow for the planting of two new trees for every tree that had been removed during construction. 150 new trees were planted along the route as part of the construction.

The H Line opened on March 18, 2023. It had an average weekday ridership of 6,900 passengers in its first year of operation.

== Route ==
The 13-mile (21 km) route has 65 stops. The northern terminus of the H Line is in Downtown Seattle at 3rd Avenue and Virginia Street. Between Downtown Seattle and West Seattle, H Line buses travel nonstop via State Route 99 and the West Seattle Bridge. The route continues down Delridge Way and Ambaum Boulevard through West Seattle and White Center, and terminates at the Burien Transit Center.

=== Stations ===
RapidRide H Line stations
Station	Notes
Virginia Street	Northern terminus; connections to RapidRide C, D and E Lines.
Pine Street	Northbound-only Stop
Pike Street	
Union Street	Northbound-only Stop
Seneca Street	Southbound Only Stop
Madison Street	
Columbia Street	
Seattle Ferry Terminal	
S Jackson Street	Connection to the RapidRide C Line
SW Andover Street	
SW Genesee Street	
SW Hudson Street	
SW Finlay Street	
SW Graham Street	
SW Holly Street	
SW Myrtle Street	
SW Holden Street	
SW Thistle Street	
SW Henderson Street	Connection to the RapidRide C Line
SW Barton Street/Westwood Village	
26th Avenue SW	
20th Avenue SW	
SW Roxbury Street	
SW 102nd Street	
SW 107th Street	
SW 112th Street	
SW 116th Street	
SW 122nd Street	
SW 128th Street	
SW 136th Street	
SW 142nd Street	
SW 148th Street	
6th Avenue SW	
Burien Transit Center	Southern terminus; connection to the RapidRide F Line

== Service ==
The H Line runs at a maximum frequency of seven minutes during rush hours in the peak direction and ten minutes during mid-day on weekdays. During evenings and on weekends, buses run every fifteen minutes.
