= RapidRide G Line =

Bus rapid transit route in Seattle, Washington

G Line

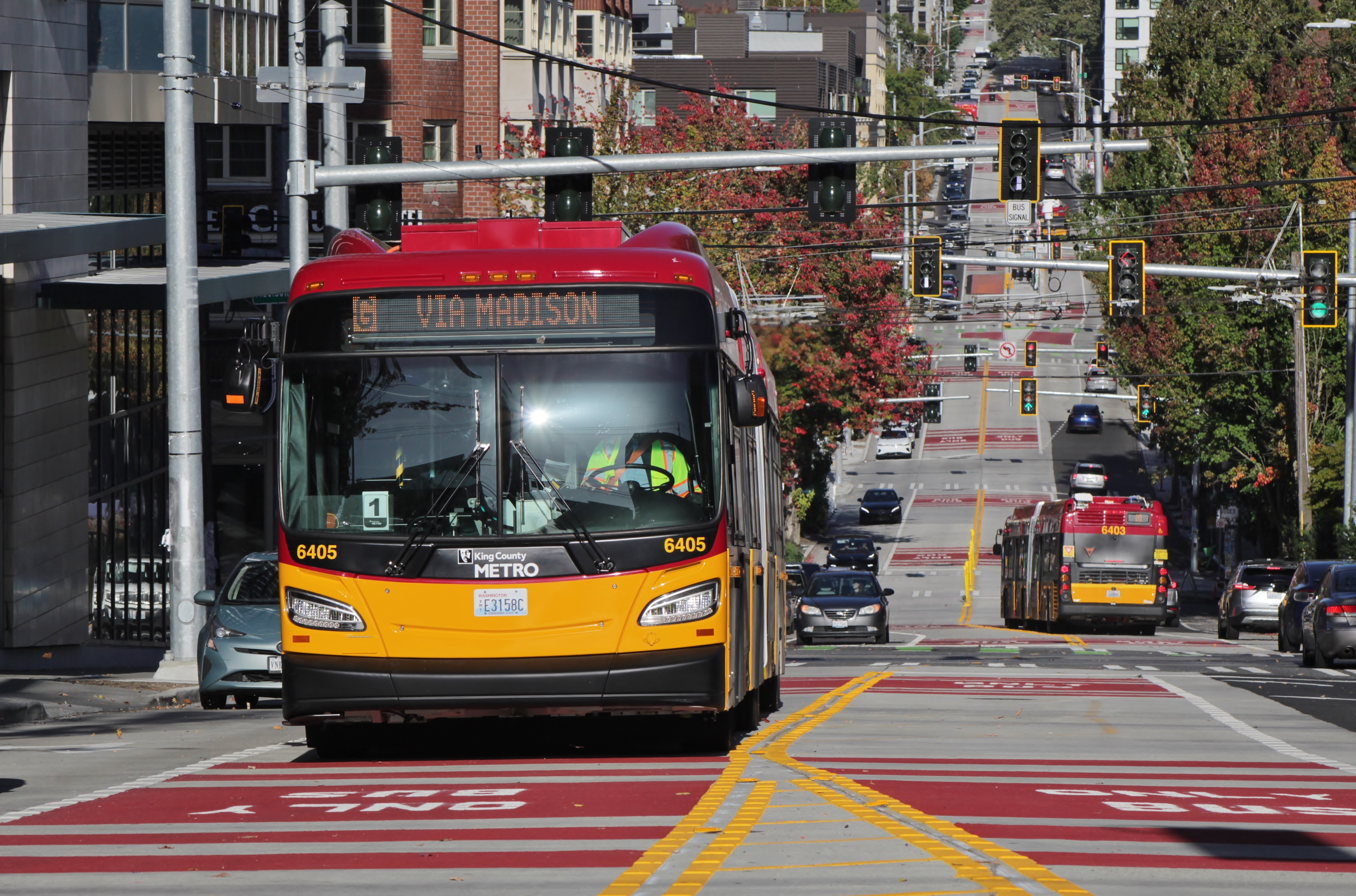
- G Line bus at Madison Street and Boylston Avenue

Overview
- System: RapidRide
- Operator: King County Metro
- Garage: Ryerson Base
- Began service: September 14, 2024

Route
- Locale: Seattle, Washington
- Start: Downtown Seattle
- Via: Madison Street
- End: Martin Luther King Jr. Way in Madison Valley
- Length: 2.1 mi (3.4 km)
- Stops: 21

The RapidRide G Line is a RapidRide bus service in Seattle, Washington, operated by King County Metro on Madison Street between Downtown Seattle and Madison Valley. It uses five-door articulated buses to serve a mix of side and center platforms at its 21 stations. The line opened for service on September 14, 2024, and cost $133.4 million to construct; it features several sections with bus lanes and transit signal priority.

== Route ==
The G Line travels 2.5 miles (4.0 km) between 1st Avenue in Downtown Seattle and Martin Luther King Jr. Way in Madison Valley on Madison Street. It is the shortest RapidRide route in the system and primarily serves as an urban connector. The line has 2.8 miles (4.5 km) of dedicated transit lanes and 1.14 miles (1.83 km) of mixed-traffic business access and transit lanes. The project included the reconstruction of 36 intersections to upgrade traffic signals and 50 blocks of refurbished sidewalks.

The route begins near Colman Dock, the city's ferry terminal, at a station on 1st Avenue. This station was planned to be shared with a future Seattle Streetcar extension. Within Downtown Seattle, buses travel eastbound on Spring Street and westbound on Madison Street in transit lanes, stopping near the Symphony light rail station at 3rd Avenue and the Seattle Central Library at 5th Avenue. The route crosses over Interstate 5 into First Hill, where the two directions merge after 9th Avenue onto Madison, continuing to run in center transit-only lanes. The G Line crosses Broadway, with a station connecting to the First Hill Streetcar, and passes the campus of Seattle University before transitioning to mixed traffic east of 15th Avenue. The route continues into Madison Valley, serving several curbside stations, before terminating at Martin Luther King Jr. Way near the Washington Park Arboretum.

=== Stops and stations ===
The G Line serves 21 total stops on its route, including 10 stops in each direction and the western terminal near Colman Dock. Stations are approximately 60 feet (18 m) long and feature off-board fare payment (including ticket vending machines), raised platforms for level boarding, branded shelters, real-time arrival information, and other features.

Station	Layout	Notes
1st Avenue	Side platform	Western terminus, shared with future Seattle Streetcar project. Connection to Colman Dock (Washington State Ferries), King County Water Taxi, and Kitsap Fast Ferries.
3rd Avenue	Side platforms	Connections to Link 1 Line and RapidRide C, D, E, and H Lines.
5th Avenue	Side platforms	
8th Avenue	Center platform (Westbound); Side platform (Eastbound)	
Terry Avenue	Center platform	
Summit Avenue/ Boylston Avenue	Center platform	Connection to First Hill Streetcar
12th Avenue/ 13th Avenue/ Union Street	Center platform	
17th Avenue	Side platforms	
22nd Avenue	Side platforms	Connection to future 23rd Ave RapidRide Line
24th Avenue	Side platforms	Connection to future 23rd Ave RapidRide Line
27th Avenue/ Martin Luther King Jr. Way	Side platforms	Eastern terminus

== Service ==
The G Line, internally designated as Route 677, runs 23 hours per day with a headway of 6 minutes on weekdays and 15 minutes during weekends, and weekday mornings and evenings. It has the highest frequency of any bus route in the King County Metro system. Travel times from Downtown Seattle to Madison Valley are projected to improve from 16 minutes to 10 minutes with the G Line. The line is projected to carry 12,000 to 18,000 daily passengers.

== Fleet ==
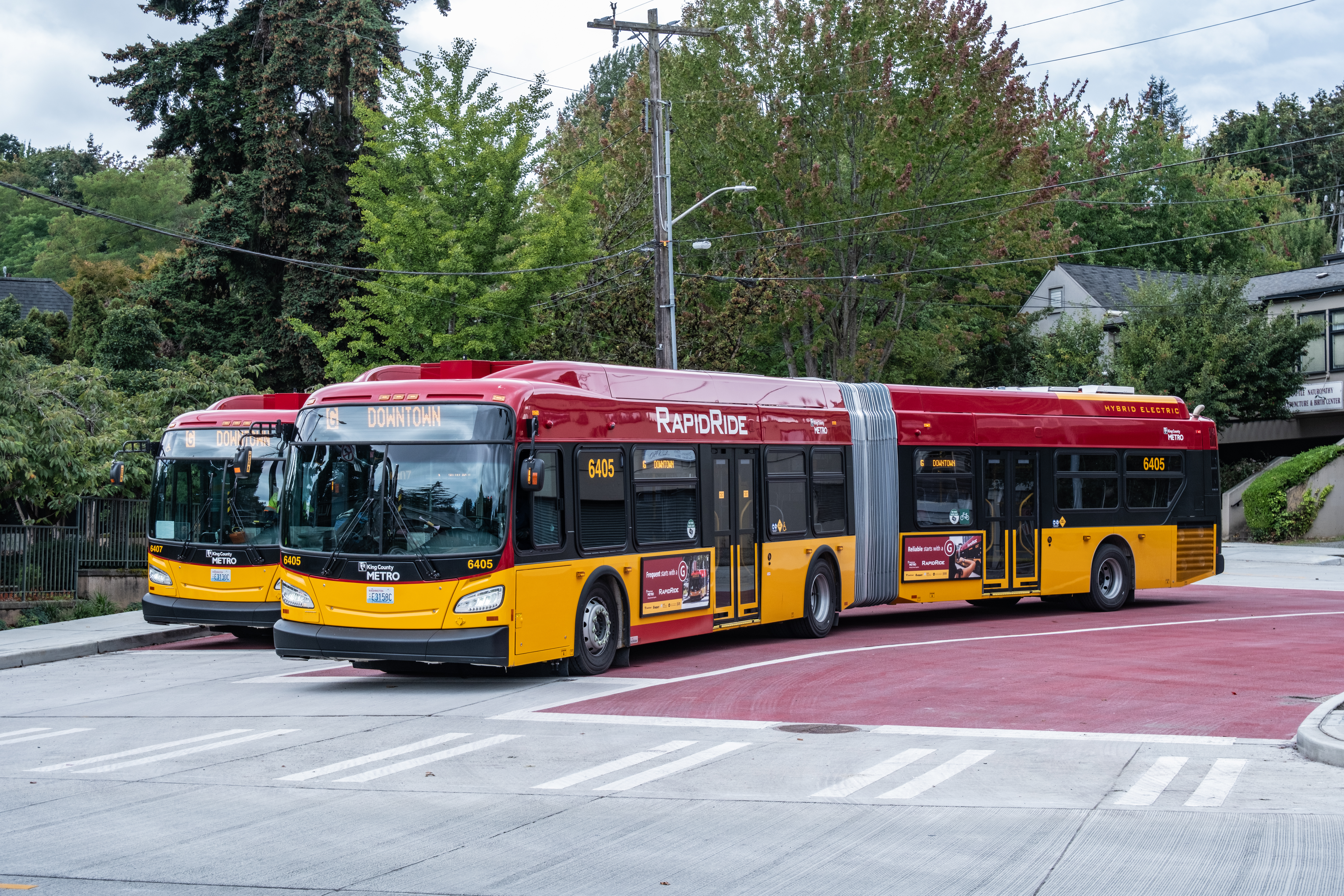
Two G Line buses at the line's outbound terminus

The G Line is operated by 60-foot-long (18 m), articulated, hybrid buses with low floors and doors on both sides. Plans to purchase new trolleybuses for this line were dropped in March 2019 after New Flyer Industries stated that the desired model would not be available in a single vehicle. Metro was unable to find another North American manufacturer willing to build articulated trolleybuses that could handle the very steep grades on the westernmost portion of the line (18–19%).

The New Flyer XDE60 buses have a total of five doors, three on the right and two on the left, for boarding at stations in the center and side of the roadway.

== Funding ==
The G Line project is expected to cost $120 million, and will be funded by a mix of sources. Funding will be provided by a grant from the Federal Transit Administration (FTA), the 2015 Move Seattle levy, and the 2016 Sound Transit 3 ballot measure. The FTA awarded a $59.9 million Small Starts grant to the city government for the project in April 2021.

== History ==
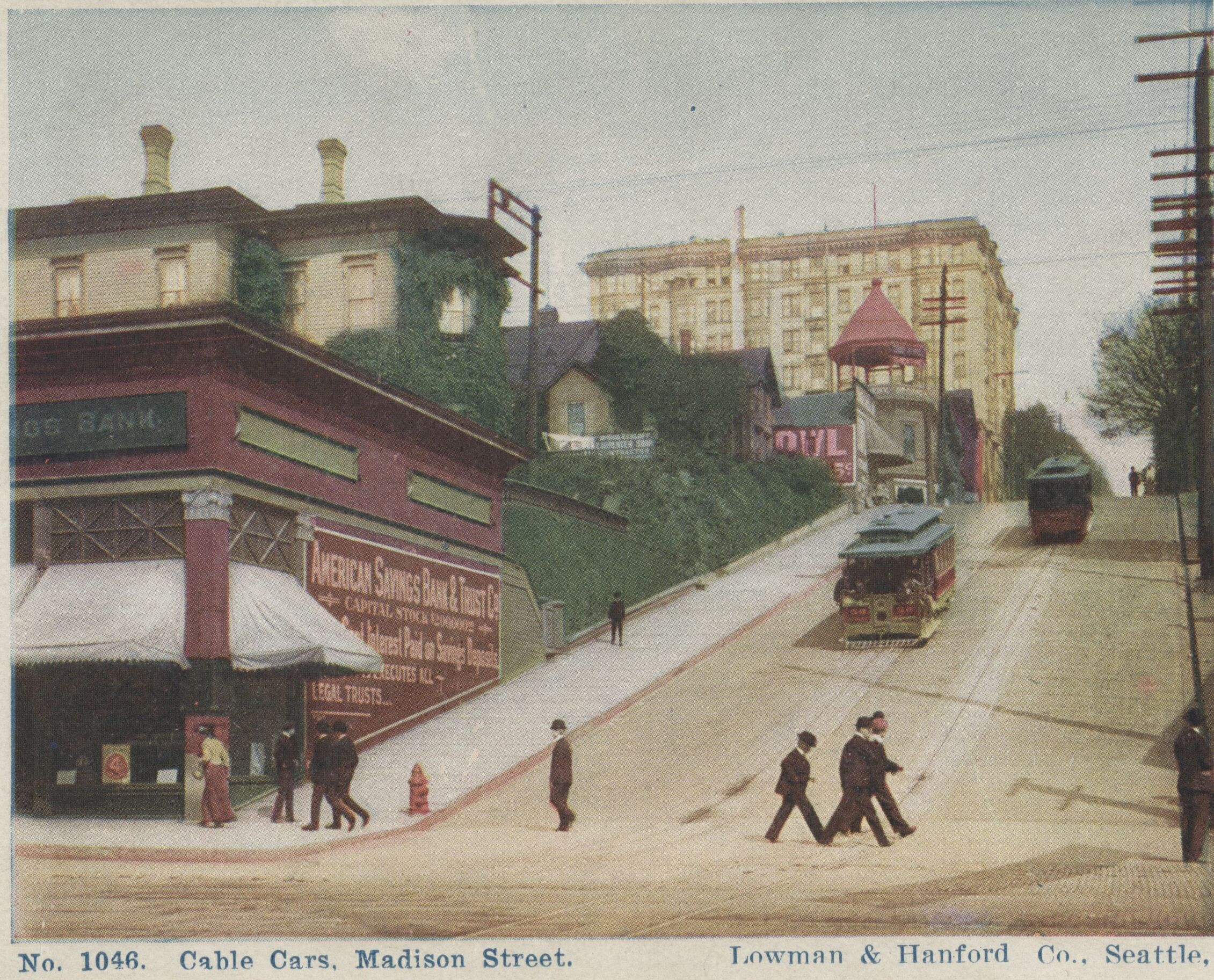
1906 postcard of the Madison St cable car line

The Madison Street corridor was identified as a bus rapid transit candidate in the 2012 Transit Master Plan, adopted by the city of Seattle with input from King County Metro. While other routes were given feasibility studies for streetcars, as part of a new municipal system, Madison Street was considered too steep to support rail transit. The Madison Street corridor, from Downtown Seattle to Madison Park, was historically served by cable cars from 1890 until 1940, when they were scrapped and replaced with motor buses and trolleybuses on modern-day routes 11 and 12.

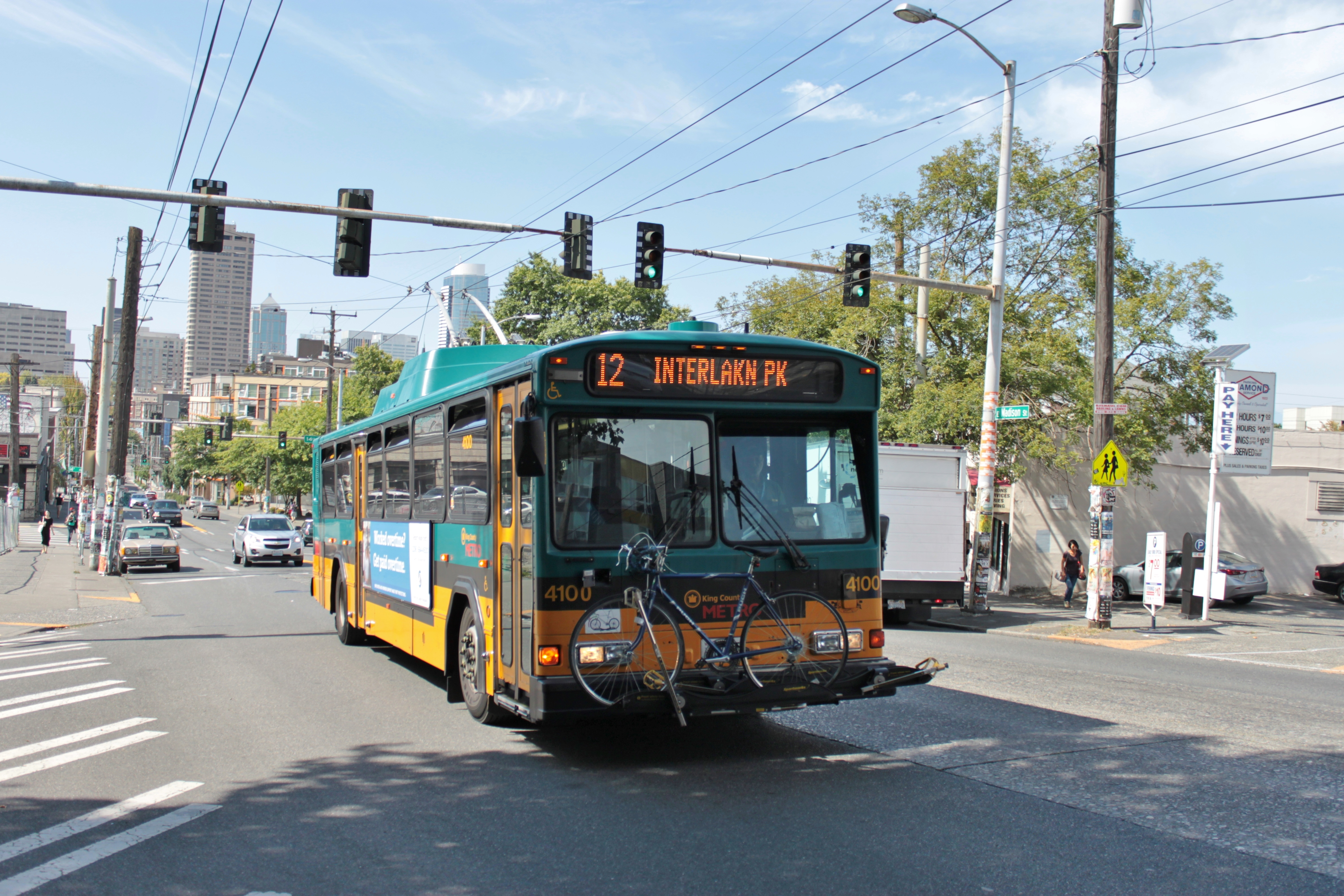
Route 12 trolleybus at Madison St and 14th Ave, 2015

A design concept for the service was first presented for public comment in 2014, featuring two options for the eastern terminus, at 23rd Avenue or Martin Luther King Jr Way (MLK Way). A public survey was conducted and found higher support for the MLK Way terminus, as well as preferences for station locations and transfers to other transit routes. In February 2016, the Seattle City Council approved a locally preferred alternative for the project and endorsed it to pursue federal funding.

Residents of a condominium building on the line opposed the construction of a traction power substation that would be needed for the trolleybuses, citing possible health risks from exposure to electromagnetic fields. Portions of properties along the route were acquired for construction of wider sidewalks and platforms, including the patio space of queer bar Pony.

As of 2017, construction on the project was planned to begin in mid-2018, with the line scheduled to open in 2019. However, it was later reported that uncertainty around federal funding was expected to delay construction. Reflecting those delays and following an FTA review, in March 2020 the projected opening date was pushed back to 2023. A further delay to 2024 and a budget increase to $133.4 million was announced in August 2020 due to an updated consultant review amid potential impacts of the COVID-19 pandemic.

A groundbreaking ceremony was held on September 30, 2021, with Federal Transit Administrator Nuria Fernandez in attendance. Construction on Madison Street began in October 2021. A ribbon-cutting ceremony was held on August 29, 2024, to mark the completion of construction. The G Line opened on September 14, 2024, with a community celebration; several routes in the area also changed to connect with the line.

The first days of service included issues with real-time arrival signs at stations, the curb-activated doors on buses, and signal priority issues. Three of the line's center platform stations opened with temporary steel plates in the busway due to construction defects that left the platforms too low for level boarding. A total of 25 shelters at stations were also rebuilt due to frame and paint issues. The steel plates were removed in March 2026 and replaced with new pavement that lifted the street level to the correct height for level boarding. The G Line reached 6,600 daily passengers in early 2026, an increase of 89 percent compared to late 2024.
