= Westwood, Washington =

Westwood, Washington may refer to:

- Westwood, Bainbridge Island, Washington
- Westwood, Seattle
- Westwood, Washington (King County)
