= ORCA card =

Proximity smart card for public transit in the Puget Sound region of Washington state

ORCA
- Location: Puget Sound region, Washington, U.S.
- Launched: April 20, 2009 (v1); May 16, 2022 (v2)
- Technology: MIFARE DESFire smart card
- Operator: Vix Technology (first generation); INIT (second generation)
- Manager: Regional ORCA Operations Team
- Currency: United States dollar ($1 minimum load, $400 maximum load)
- Stored-value: E-purse
- Credit expiry: None
- Auto recharge: Yes
- Validity: Community Transit; Everett Transit; King County Metro; King County Water Taxi; Kitsap Fast Ferries; Kitsap Transit; Pierce Transit; Seattle Center Monorail; Seattle Streetcar; Sound Transit (Link light rail, Sounder, ST Express); Washington State Ferries
- Retailed: Vending machines; Online; Mail; Customer service centers; Grocery stores
- Variants: Reduced Regional Fare Permit; ORCA Youth Card; ORCA LIFT
- Website: myORCA.com

The ORCA card (standing for One Regional Card for All) is a contactless, stored-value fare and smart card system for public transit in the Puget Sound region of Washington, United States. It is valid on most transit systems in the Seattle metropolitan area, including Sound Transit, local bus agencies, Washington State Ferries, the King County Water Taxi, and Kitsap Fast Ferries. The ORCA card was launched in 2009 and is managed by the Central Puget Sound Regional Fare Coordination Project, a board composed of local transit agencies.

Physical and virtual ORCA cards are able to be loaded with "e-purse" value, similar to a debit card, and monthly passes. Physical cards are sold and reloaded at participating grocery stores, customer service centers, and ticket vending machines at transit stations. Virtual cards can be added to Google Wallet. ORCA cards offer free transfers between transit systems within a two-hour window. Some transit systems also accept debit and credit cards with near-field communication enabled as well as mobile payment platforms.

In 2018, Sound Transit contracted INIT to replace the original system with an account-based, open architecture system that would become the second generation of the ORCA card. It began its rollout in May 2022 to support new payment options and real-time account management and fare processing. Google Wallet support was added in 2024 and an expansion to support debit and credit cards rolled out in February 2026.

== History ==
The former ORCA card logo

Central Puget Sound transit agencies have collaborated in a region-wide fare system since 1991 with the introduction of U-PASS and later FlexPass. In 1996, voters approved Sound Move, which called for an integrated regional fare policy for a "one-ticket ride". That goal led to the creation of the PugetPass in 1999, which allowed transit riders to use a single pass for five transit agencies.

On April 29, 2003, an agreement to implement a smart card system between the seven agencies in the Central Puget Sound Regional Fare Coordination Project (Sound Transit, King County Metro, Community Transit, Everett Transit, Pierce Transit, Kitsap Transit, and Washington State Ferries) was signed along with a $43 million contract awarded to ERG Transit Systems (now Vix Technology) as the vendor and system integrator of the project. The ORCA card was originally anticipated to be operational in 2006.

The former ORCA card design

Between November 9 and December 22, 2006, as many as 6,000 transit riders were asked to participate in a live test of the smart card system. The test was conducted on selected routes of the seven participating agencies. The University of Washington conducted a separate test for integrating ORCA with the Husky Card and U-PASS during the same period.

A limited rollout of the ORCA system began on April 20, 2009, which allowed remaining technical issues in the system to be resolved. An extensive rollout and public outreach campaign followed in June 2009. Blank cards were available at no charge during the introductory period, which lasted until March 1; from then on, the card cost $5 ($3 for reduced fare permit holders). Users of PugetPasses, FlexPasses, and other passes were to be gradually transitioned to ORCA.

=== Launch timeline ===
The ORCA launch press kit gave a launch timeline as follows:

- April 17, 2009 – Press release announcing launch of ORCA.
- April 20, 2009 – Orcacard.com and 1-888-988-ORCA call center launches. Customer Service Offices begin ORCA card distribution.
- May 2009 – Sounder Ticket Vending Machines (TVMs) begin ORCA card distribution. "ORCA is Here" inserts and posters appear in Customer Service Offices and on board buses, trains, and ferries. Switch began of Reduced Fare customers and Business Accounts to ORCA (continued into 2010).
- June 2009 – "ORCA is Here!" radio and print ads and bus billboards appear. Public outreach campaign with blank card distribution.
- July 2009 – Link light rail service begins and Link TVMs begin ORCA card distribution.
- Jan 1, 2010 – Elimination of intersystem paper transfers.
- Fall 2010 – The planned replacement of University of Washington student and employee ID cards with ORCA-integrated photo ID cards was delayed until sometime in 2011. The U-PASS and the King County employee passes were to be dual purpose passes and were to include the ORCA chip.
- May 2013 – 120 retail stores from QFC, Safeway, and Sears begin selling ORCA cards
- 2015 – The regional day pass debuts
- 2019 – 10 year anniversary card released
- 2023-2025 – Three designs featuring art by youth artists released, coinciding with the opening of RapidRide lines H, G, and I.

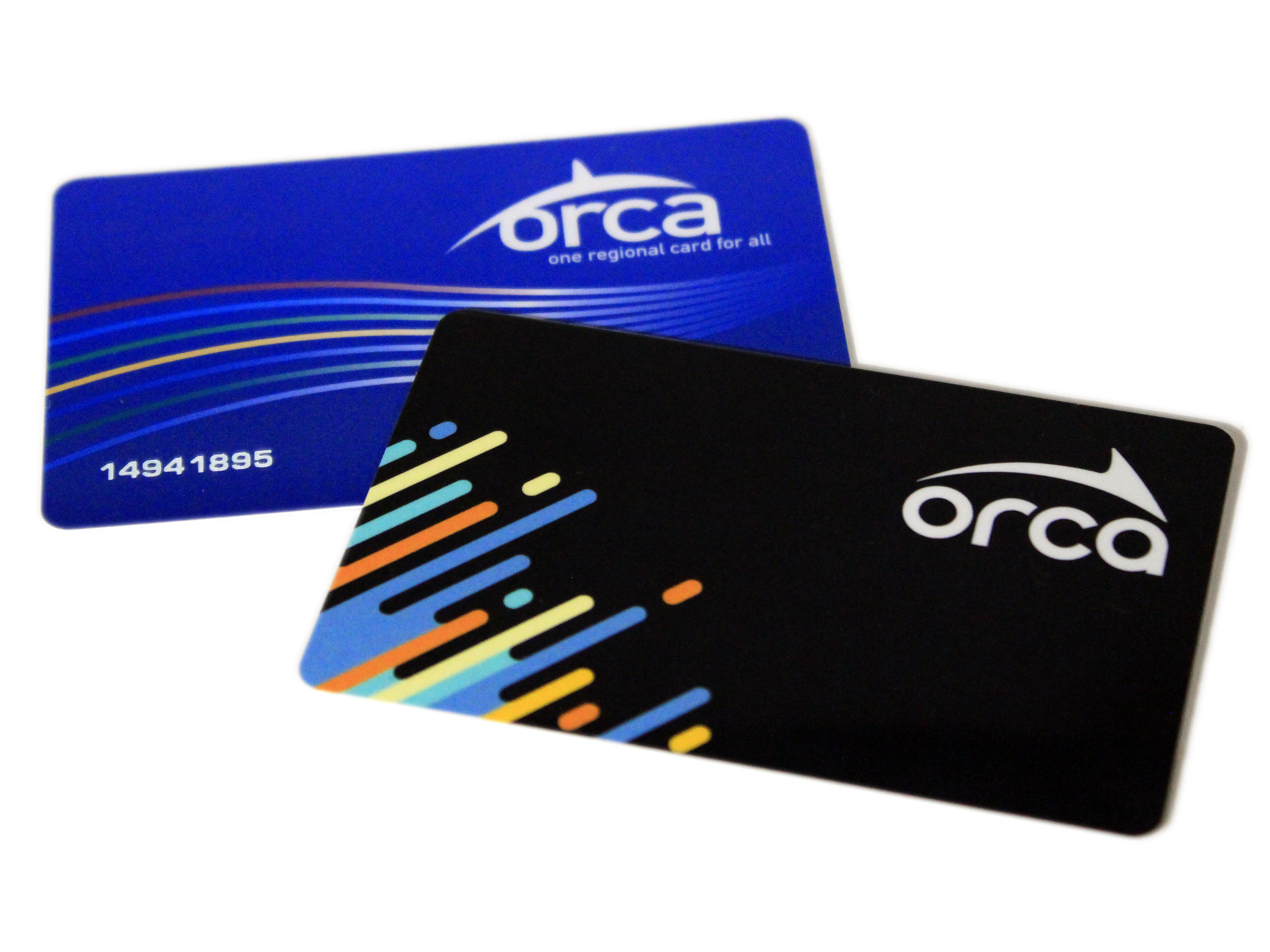
First-generation (left) and second-generation (right) ORCA cards

=== Branding ===
The ORCA name refers to orca whales that inhabit the Puget Sound. The name was originally suggested by the Sound Transit project manager as in keeping with a theme of successful earlier smart card system names such as Oyster (in London) and Octopus (in Hong Kong), but the name was not accepted by the project joint board until the acronym "One Regional Card for All" was suggested by another Sound Transit staff member.

An orca mascot for the card and system was unveiled in 2023 and named "Boop" in a public contest. The mascot's name is an onomatopoeia for the sound of a card reader when an ORCA card is tapped.

=== Next generation project ===
The ORCA Joint Board approved a capital-and-service contract with INIT in 2018 to design and implement a major overhaul of the ORCA system, including new cards, mobile ticketing, and compatibility with contactless payment credit cards and smartphones. Approximately 2,900 on-board fare validators, 1,000 off-board validators, and 250 vending machines were to be replaced under the contract.

A new website and smartphone app was launched in May 2022 with a weekend-long fare-free period to introduce new validators and card readers. Ticket vending machines for Link light rail were also taken offline for three days as part of the transition. The new website and app allowed for fare management without the previous 24-hour delay. The new card readers and validators initially did not display e-purse balances and pass statues until a later update. The machines' noise was also reduced, which drew criticism from passengers and was later corrected.

The new, black-colored cards debuted in October 2022 as part of a retail rollout following a short beta test period. On June 24, 2024, virtual ORCA cards were made available for Google Wallet users with full support across the system's member agencies. Additional smartphone and contactless credit card compatibility had also been announced for 2023, but these features were delayed due to system issues with the user experience and management of employee accounts. In May 2024, an estimated 431,000 ORCA cards were used for at least one trip.

A trial of "tap to pay" capability, which supports debit and credit cards with near-field communication chips as well as mobile wallet platforms, began on the RapidRide G Line on February 2, 2026. The feature was rolled out to most transit systems within the ORCA network on February 23, with the exception of Washington State Ferries, the Seattle Center Monorail, and various microtransit and dial-a-ride systems. The switch to allowing other forms of contactless payment was made as part of preparations for Seattle's matches in the 2026 FIFA World Cup. Apple Wallet is planned to be implemented at a later date.

== Technology ==
The original card uses the ISO/IEC 14443 RFID standard. Specifically, the MIFARE DESFire EV1 which "implements all 4 levels of ISO / IEC 14443A and uses optional ISO / IEC 7816-4 commands.".

The new card, which features a black design, includes a barcode and magstripe for quicker reloading at retail outlets.

== Agencies ==
ORCA is managed by the Central Puget Sound Regional Fare Coordination System, a joint board of directors with representatives of all member transit agencies. Day-to-day management is provided by the staff of Sound Transit and King County Metro.

The following agencies and services accept the ORCA card:

- Community Transit
- Everett Transit
- King County Metro
- King County Water Taxi
- Kitsap Transit (buses and foot ferries; ferries accept E-purse and agency specific passes, do not accept PugetPass)
- Pierce Transit
- Sound Transit (Link light rail, Sounder commuter rail, and Sound Transit Express buses)
- Seattle Streetcar
- Washington State Ferries (accepts E-purse and agency specific passes, does not accept PugetPass)
- Seattle Center Monorail (Note: As of 2026, PugetPasses only cover a portion of the Monorail fare; ORCA cards are charged the difference in E-purse value.)

== Products ==
=== E-purse ===
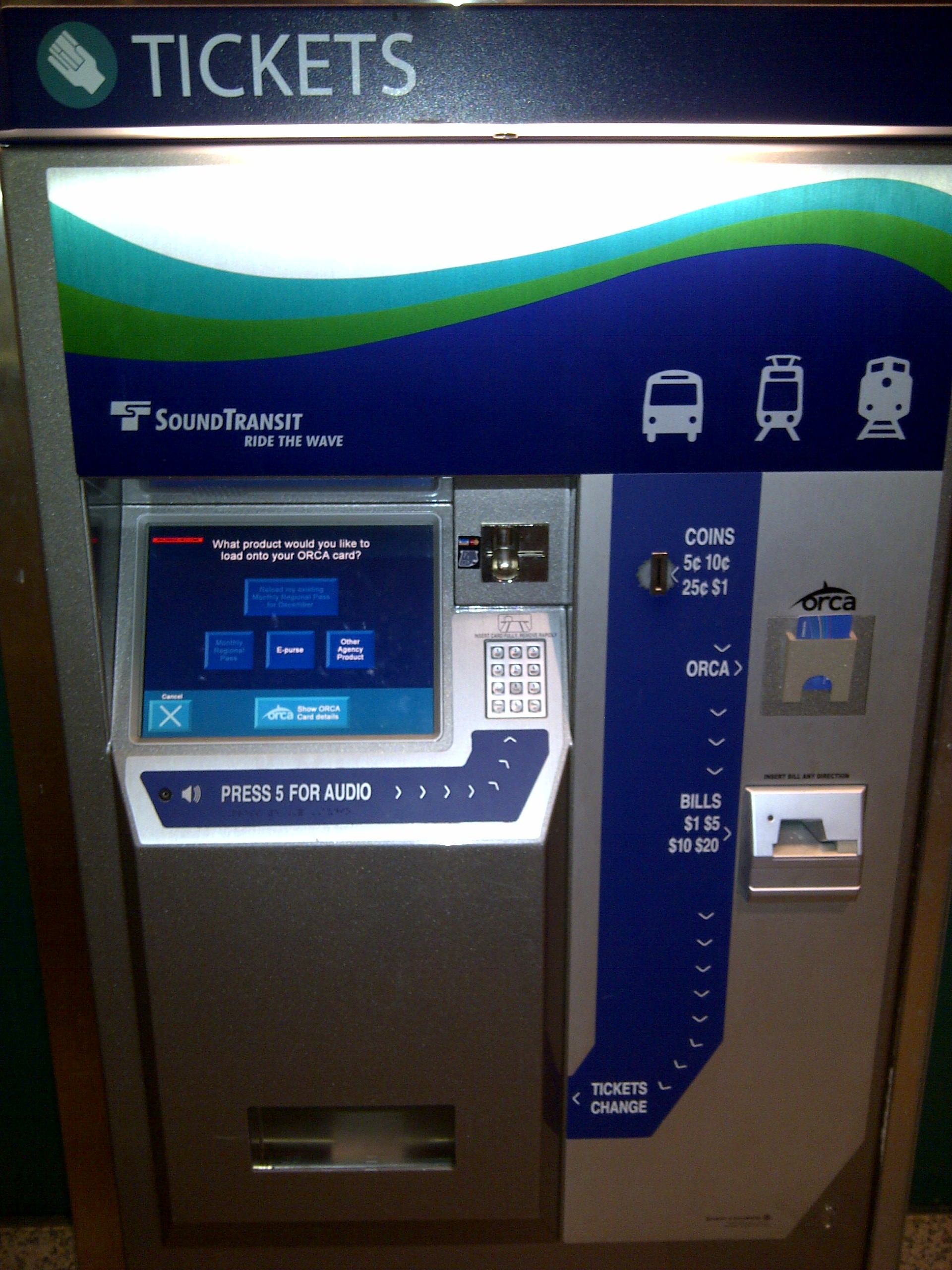
First-generation ORCA vending machine, built by Scheidt & Bachmann

An ORCA card can be used as a stored-value card through a function called the electronic purse (E-purse). The E-purse holds value that can be used like cash to pay fare. The minimum value that can be added to an E-purse is $5. The maximum value that can be stored in an E-purse is $400.

=== PugetPass ===
PugetPass is a regional monthly pass that lets passengers travel on nearly every transit service in the region for a calendar month. A PugetPass is valid for payment of trip fares up to the value of the pass. Trip fares above the value of the pass may be paid with E-purse value. (Example: a passenger who has a $2.50 PugetPass and rides a service that costs $3.75 would have $2.50 covered by the PugetPass and $1.25 would be deducted from their E-Purse). Washington State Ferries does not accept the PugetPass. Pass values available range from 50¢ to $5.75 in 25¢ increments; there is also a $10.00 value pass. Passes are priced at $36 per $1 of fare value.

=== Contactless payment ===
Since February 2026, ORCA has accepted other forms of contactless payment at fare readers on most trains, buses, and ferries; the exceptions include the Seattle Center Monorail and Washington State Ferries. Credit and debit cards with contactless capabilities from Visa, Mastercard, Discover, or American Express are accepted, along with mobile wallet platforms Apple Pay, Google Pay, and Samsung Pay. Riders using a contactless card or mobile wallet are able to access normal adult fares and receive a 2-hour transfer; other ORCA products, such as passes, youth fares, and ORCA Lift, are not able to use contactless payment platforms. For services that use proof-of-payment for fare collection, fare enforcement personnel will ask for part of a card number to confirm payment.

=== Regional Day Pass ===
This pass costs $6 or $2 (reduced fare) and is valid for unlimited rides on all supported regional transit agencies (not including Kitsap Fast Ferries or Washington State Ferries) for the entirety of the day in which it was purchased.The Regional Day Pass can be purchased at stations, online, or on a mobile app.

=== Agency specific products and pass ===
An agency pass covers rides on a specific transit agency's service. Examples include Washington State Ferries' monthly passes, Metro ACCESS paratransit passes, and Metro vanpool passes.

=== Business products ===
Employers may purchase one of two products for their employees:

The ORCA Business Passport is comprehensive, annual transportation pass program. Employers pay a flat annual cost per employee and each receives an ORCA card that covers almost all transit services in the Puget Sound, including Vanpool. Employers must cover all employees.

The ORCA Business Choice allows businesses to add funds to employee ORCA cards on a monthly basis in the form of an E-voucher. The E-voucher can be used to purchase a monthly PugetPass or E-purse value. Any unused E-voucher amount at the end of the month is removed from the employee ORCA cards and refunded to the business.

==== Seattle Public Schools ====
Seattle's former Mayor Jenny Durkan proposed free ORCA cards for students enrolled in Seattle Public Schools. Seattle Public Schools has issued ORCA cards to students previously; the Interagency program provided these to students from low-income families and those who live more than two miles from their school. Starting in 2022, all youth under 19 years old are able to ride public transportation for free; Seattle Public Schools no longer provides ORCA cards to students as they are not necessary. Students can still order a free youth ORCA card from MyORCA, however, tapping is not necessary to board transit.

== Features ==
=== Transfers ===
ORCA cards allow a two-hour transfer from the time fare is paid. If an E-purse or regional pass was used to pay fare, transfers are allowed on any bus or rail system in the region. If an agency pass was used, transfers are allowed only on services within that agency. Transfers are stored on the card and automatically calculated for the user. Transfers are not given or accepted on Washington State Ferries.

=== Fare preset ===
ORCA card users paying with an E-purse can set their zone preference for King County Metro and Sound Transit services. Since July 2018, King County Metro is single-zone only.

=== Balance protection ===
Balance protection protects the user from losing any value on the card when it is lost or stolen. A replacement card is issued with its value restored for the cost of a new card if the card is registered.

=== Trip protection ===
Since July 2022, ORCA cards allow for a negative balance of up to $2.75 owed to allow users to continue traveling until they can reach a usable vending machine or reloading station.

=== Autoload ===
An Autoload automatically adds transportation products to an ORCA card on a regular basis using a Visa or MasterCard. Examples of autoloads are adding value to an E-purse when its balance falls below a certain amount and recurring purchases of monthly passes.

=== myORCA account ===
A myORCA account can be created on the ORCA website to monitor and manage ORCA cards. The account lets the user view transportation products stored on their card (E-purse balance, validity period of passes), transaction history, purchase additional ORCA cards for others, set up an Autoload, set fare presets, and report lost, stolen, or damaged cards.

=== Low-income fare ===
The ORCA LIFT program discounts fares to $1.00 per ride for users of the ORCA card earning less than 200 percent of the federal poverty level. Seniors and those with disabilities are also eligible for reduced fare payments under the Regional Reduced Fare Permit (RRFP) program.

== Criticism ==
=== New card fee ===
A new ORCA card costs $3; prior to May 2022, this fee was $5, one of the highest prices for a public transportation smart card in the United States. The King County Council requested a study in 2016 on the impact of either eliminating the $5 fee or adding $5 in value to all newly purchased cards. The report, delivered in June 2017 by Metro, calculated that each card costs $8 to administer and process and a $3 fee would reduce revenue by $1.67 million annually.

The $5 fee was waived for all new cards for a three-month period beginning December 1, 2020, due to the COVID-19 pandemic. The fee on youth cards was waived through May 2021 and was later permanently eliminated.

=== Privacy concerns ===
Like all transit cards, ORCA cards may be used to track users. In the case of subsidized cards, information regarding a rider's trips may be released to third parties including employers who provide the cards.
