= RapidRide =

Brand of bus routes in King County, Washington, U.S.

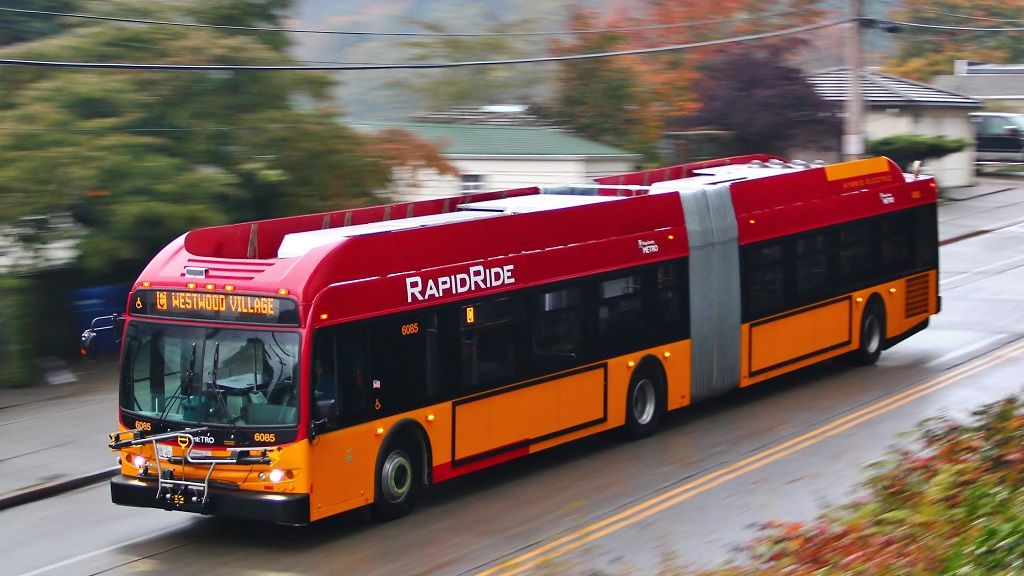
- RapidRide bus running on the C Line
- Founded: October 2, 2010
- Headquarters: Seattle, Washington, U.S.
- Locale: King County
- Routes: 8 (A through H) with 18 planned
- Fleet: 196 buses: 20 New Flyer DE60LFA; 93 New Flyer DE60LFR; 83 New Flyer XDE60
- Daily ridership: 64,860 (2016)
- Annual ridership: 20,700,000 (2016)
- Fuel type: Diesel-electric hybrid
- Operator: King County Metro
- Website: RapidRide

RapidRide is a network of limited-stop bus routes with some bus rapid transit features in King County, Washington, United States, operated by King County Metro. The network consists of eight routes totaling 76 miles (122 km) that carried riders on approximately 64,860 trips on an average weekday in 2016, comprising about 17 percent of King County Metro's total daily ridership.

RapidRide lines are faster than typical local bus routes because they service fewer stops (on average, 40% fewer than the routes they replaced), make extensive use of bus priority to preempt traffic lights, and on some lines, use special lanes to bypass traffic. RapidRide lines run no less often than every 10 minutes during peak commuting hours and every 15 minutes on weekends and during most off-peak hours. Most lines (except the B, F and H lines) also have night owl (late night and early morning) service.

== History ==
The creation of the RapidRide network was one of the main elements of King County's "Transit Now" initiative that was proposed in April 2006 and approved by voters in November 2006. Funding for the construction and operation of the lines came from a 0.1% sales tax increase included in Transit Now, contributions from local cities and over $80 million in grants from state and federal agencies. One of the most notable local contributions was from Seattle, which funded traffic signal and roadway improvements with the city's "Bridging the Gap" property tax levy, passed at the same time as Transit Now in November 2006.

Transit Now called for a network of routes that included these bus rapid transit features:

- High-frequency operation (defined as 10 minutes or less)
- Faster, more reliable trip times through exclusive, HOV or Business Access and Transit (BAT) travel lanes, and/or priority at intersections through transit signal priority and queue jumps
- Improved shelter waiting areas with real-time information at major stops
- Low emission hybrid diesel-electric buses
- Branded buses and facilities with a unique look and feel

These improvements were to be made on five key travel corridors identified in the initiative:

- Shoreline/Downtown Seattle via Aurora Avenue North
- West Seattle/Downtown Seattle via West Seattle Bridge
- Ballard/Seattle Center/south downtown stadium area via 15th Ave Northwest & West Mercer St with service or frequent connections to Ballard High School and the Ballard business district
- Federal Way-Tukwila via Pacific Highway South
- Bellevue-Redmond via Crossroads and Overlake

Planning and construction began shortly after approval of the measure. Along each of the corridors, fiber-optic cable was utilized to enable a Transit Signal Priority system (to synchronize traffic signals with buses), an automated vehicle location system and the features on "tech pylons" to be installed at certain locations.

Every stop along the line received some level of improvement, with the degree of investment determined by the ridership. All stops were enhanced with new concrete, RapidRide signage, and a new bus stop flag featuring route information, a solar-powered area light, and a stop request strobe light, to signal to drivers that a passenger is waiting. Additionally, moderately busy stops received new shelters, benches and trash cans. The busiest stops were improved into "stations" with large shelters and a "tech pylon" with an electronic real-time arrival sign, audible arrival information, a backlit route map, and an ORCA reader for off-board fare payment.

Shortly after the approval of Transit Now, Metro's revenues sales tax revenues saw a steep and prolonged decline. To combat the loss of income Metro underwent a series of efficiency measures, including restructuring routes to reduce operating costs. The RapidRide system was largely shielded from these cuts because federal and state grant funding helped pay for new buses and infrastructure. Also, in many cases, Metro actively restructured its network to shift riders to the new faster, high-capacity RapidRide routes.

The A Line between Federal Way and Tukwila International Boulevard station was the first to begin service on October 2, 2010, leveraging the pre-existing high-occupancy vehicle lanes on Pacific Highway South and International Boulevard (both part of State Route 99). The line replaced Route 174, that mainly operated along the same corridor and complements the nearby Central Link light rail line that opened just months before the A Line. The A Line has terminals at Tukwila International Boulevard Link station and Federal Way Downtown station.

One year later on October 2, 2011, the B Line opened on the Eastside, connecting Redmond, Overlake, and Bellevue. The opening of the RapidRide corridor enabled a major restructure of most of the bus routes serving the Eastside. In addition to the B Line, three new routes were created, 11 routes received new a routing, and 13 routes were deleted.

Next up were the RapidRide corridors in Seattle, but the nationwide economic downturn forced Metro to create a lower cost routing than was proposed in the Transit Now measure. The connection between Ballard and the south downtown stadium area was scrapped in favor of interlining the West Seattle and Ballard lines. Upon reaching downtown, northbound C Line buses would change signs to continue north as the D Line and southbound D Line buses would change signs to continue south as the C Line. For riders, that meant that instead of running to the south downtown stadium area, the Ballard line would only reach the midtown area of Downtown Seattle. The move allowed King County Metro to purchase fewer buses and save on operations expenses. This interline was finally broken in March 2016 after the passage of Proposition 1 in the City of Seattle, dedicating additional tax revenue to support the Metro system.

After several months of outreach by the Seattle Department of Transportation, it was decided that the C Line would serve the Alaska Junction (a major transfer point for buses), the Fauntleroy ferry terminal and Westwood Village. For the D Line, the decision was made to serve Ballard High School and the Crown Hill neighborhood and offer frequent connecting service to the Ballard business district via Route 44 on NW Market Street and the new Route 40 on Leary Ave NW. In the years since the change, both Route 40 and 44 have become so popular that they are now scheduled to be converted into RapidRide corridors.

RapidRide service from Downtown Seattle to Ballard and West Seattle began on September 29, 2012. The opening of the new lines (along with budget cuts forced by the economic downturn) prompted a substantial restructuring of Metro's system in Seattle. Five new routes were created, dozens were revised, and 15 were deleted (including several routes that dated back to the streetcar-era).

The third line to open in Seattle, was the E Line along Aurora Avenue North. It replaced one of the busiest and most infamous routes in Metro's system, the 358 Express. While the implementation of the E Line did not trigger another major restructuring of routes, it did require a major improvement project along Aurora Avenue. As part of the project, the cities of Seattle and Shoreline implemented BAT (Business Access and Transit) lanes along most of the corridor, reserving the outside lanes for buses and right-turning vehicles. The cities also made major improvements to pedestrian facilities along the corridor. The E Line opened on February 15, 2014 after several months of delays.

In late 2009, the construction of a sixth line was added to the system that would run between Burien and Renton in South King County. The King County Executive had initially dropped the line from the Transit Now initiative, but higher than expected tax revenue and lower than expected costs from the five initial lines, allowed the line to be funded. The F Line connects several major South King County transportation hubs including the Burien Transit Center, the Tukwila International Boulevard Link station (also served by the A Line), the transit center at Southcenter Mall, the Tukwila Sounder station, and the Renton Transit Center. The F Line was initially slated to replace Route 140, but an extension to the Boeing Renton Factory and the Renton Landing also allowed Metro to eliminate Route 110. The F Line began operation on June 7, 2014, after several months of delays.

In June 2015, midday frequencies were improved on the RapidRide C, D, and E Lines, bringing up Monday-Saturday daytime frequency from every 15 minutes to every 10–12 minutes to accommodate increased ridership. Following those changes, in March 2016, the RapidRide C and D Line were disconnected from one another. The D Line was extended to its original planned terminus in Pioneer Square, connecting riders better to South Downtown employment sites and visitors attractions. The C Line was extended into the vastly growing Denny Triangle and South Lake Union areas using new transit priority lanes on Westlake Avenue. The H Line began operation on March 18, 2023, replacing Route 120.

== Lines ==
=== Current ===
RapidRide operates on eight corridors across the Seattle metropolitan area, with four more planned for construction. The C, D, E, and H lines run in a north-to-south pattern, meeting in the downtown, while the G Line operates in perpendicular to them, linking the area to Madison Valley. All five run close to the Downtown Seattle Transit Tunnel and its four Link stations. Two more lines run to the south of Seattle with the Tukwila International Boulevard as an intermodal hub: the A Line starts there and follows Link's 1 Line to the Federal Way Downtown, while F Line connects to the station as it runs between Renton and Burien. Finally, the B Line is the system's only separate line, partially following Link's Line 2 between the termini at Bellevue Transit Center and Downtown Redmond. Much like the light rail route prior to the opening of the Crosslake Connection, the B Line exclusively serves the Eastside.

The system also links to rail services: C and H lines stop near the King Street Station served by Amtrak and Sounder commuter rail.

- A Line (began October 2010): Tukwila – Sea–Tac Airport – SeaTac – Des Moines – Kent – Federal Way
- B Line (began October 2011): Redmond – Overlake – Crossroads – Bellevue
- C Line (began September 2012): West Seattle – Downtown Seattle – South Lake Union
- D Line (began September 2012): Crown Hill – Ballard – Interbay – Uptown – Downtown Seattle
- E Line (began February 2014): Shoreline – Bitter Lake – West Green Lake – Downtown Seattle
- F Line (began June 2014): Burien – SeaTac – Tukwila – Renton.
- G Line (began September 2024): Downtown Seattle – First Hill – Madison Valley
- H Line (began March 2023): Downtown Seattle – Delridge – White Center – Burien

=== Future ===
In the late 2010s, plans were made to construct and open 13 new RapidRide corridors by 2025. The city of Seattle plans to pay for seven of the routes located primarily within its borders, while King County will locate the funding for the six routes in suburban areas outside of Seattle. The improvements are expected to be funded by federal and state grants. Additionally, the improvements in the city of Seattle will be partially funded by the "Move Seattle" property tax levy passed in November 2015. The network will create a grid of frequent bus lines connecting the major population centers in King County. In many cases, the opening of the routes is timed to coincide with the expansion of Sound Transit's Link light rail system.

On September 23, 2020, King County Metro announced delays to the I, J, K, and R lines. Work on the I and J lines will proceed while the R and K lines have been put on hold. King County also plans to add a further seven RapidRide routes between 2025 and 2040.

Project name	Status	Expected Opening	Routing	Comparable Route(s)	Length
I Line	Under Construction	2027	Renton – Kent – Auburn	160	16.5 mi (26.6 km)
J Line	Under Construction	2027	U District Station – South Lake Union – Downtown Seattle via Roosevelt Way/11th Avenue and Eastlake Avenue	70	6 mi (9.7 km)
K Line	Planned	2030	Kirkland – Bellevue – Eastgate	239, 250, 255, 271	14.6 mi (23.5 km)
R Line	Planned	2030	Downtown Seattle – Mount Baker – Rainier Valley via Rainier Avenue	7	8 mi (13 km)
(none)	Planned	TBD	Bothell – Kenmore – Lake City – U-District	372	14.8 mi (23.8 km)
Market	Planned	TBD	Ballard – Wallingford – U-District via Market Street and N 45th Street	44	5.9 mi (9.5 km)
Fremont	Planned	TBD	Northgate – Ballard – Fremont – South Lake Union – Downtown Seattle via Westlake Avenue	40	13.7 mi (22.0 km)
(none)	Planned	TBD	Des Moines – Kent – Covington – Auburn	165	11.9 mi (19.2 km)
23rd	Planned	TBD	Mount Baker – Central District – U-District via 23rd Avenue	48	7 mi (11 km)
(none)	Planned	TBD	Overlake – Eastgate – Newcastle – Renton	240, 245	17.7 mi (28.5 km)
(none)	Planned	TBD	Federal Way – Auburn	181	13.9 mi (22.4 km)
Greenlake	Planned	TBD	Loyal Heights – Greenwood – Greenlake – U District via N 85th St	45	
(none)	Planned	TBD	Shoreline CC – Bitter Lake – Greenwood – Phinney – Fremont – Downtown Seattle via Greenwood Ave N	5	

== Stations and stops ==
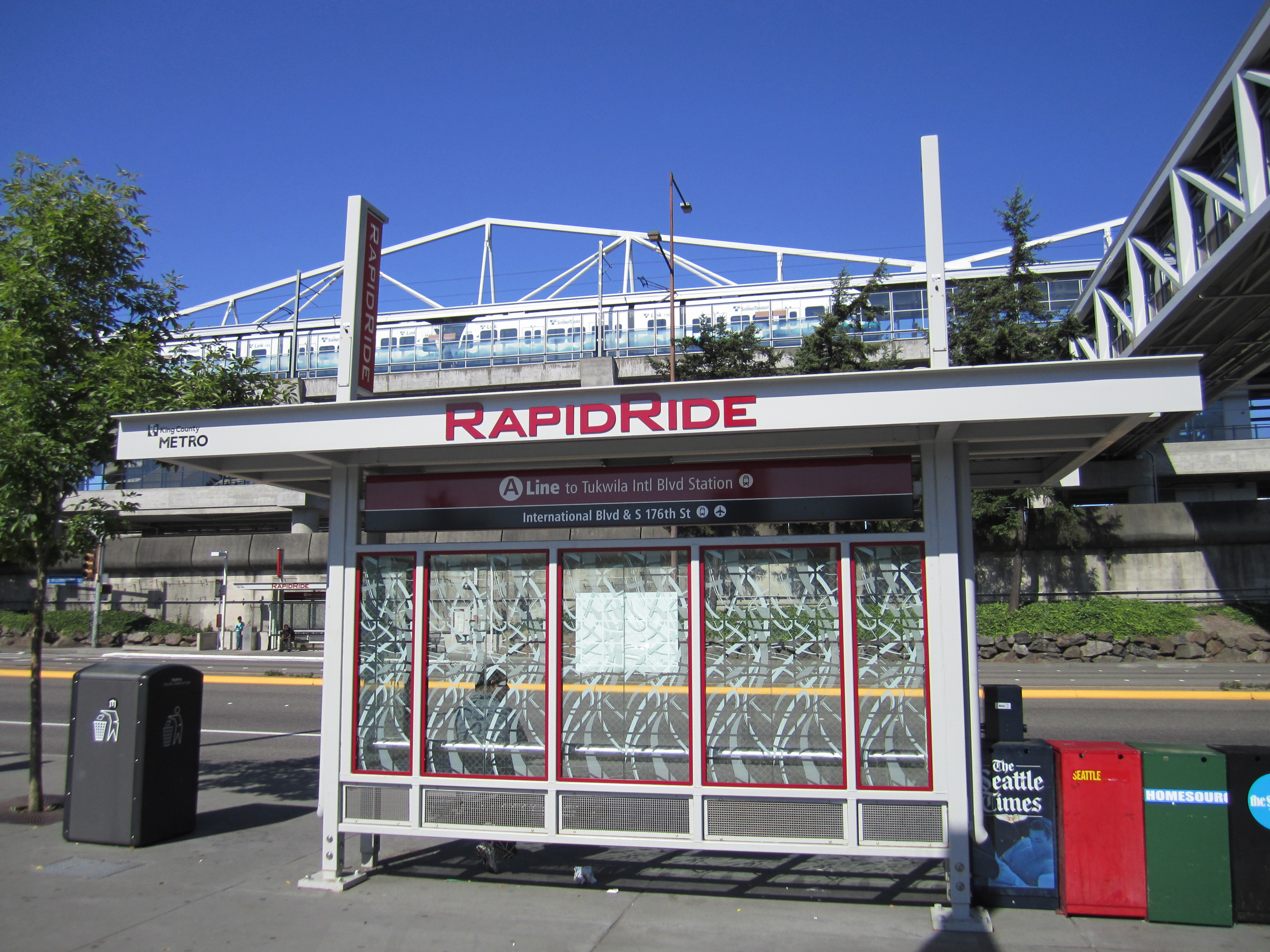
RapidRide station shelter

Stops are farther apart than typical Metro service in order to increase speed and reliability, and create "stations" that are akin to what is found on light rail lines. The stations look different from normal bus stops and have "tech pylons" that feature ORCA card readers for off-board fare payment, real time information signs and automated voice announcements to communicate estimated arrival times of RapidRide buses. To increase security, stations are lit and are patrolled by transit police. Because of the frequent headways, riders do not have to wait as long at stations as they do at normal bus stops.

== Equipment ==
RapidRide uses low-floor, diesel-electric hybrid articulated buses that are equipped three doors and painted with an identifiable look (a red and yellow livery) distinct from the buses used on other Metro routes.

RapidRide uses a proof-of-payment system: passengers who have a valid transfer or who tap their ORCA Card at an off-board validator (located at most "station" stops) can board any of the three doors on the bus; those who do not must board through the front door, pay their fare, and get a transfer, which serves as proof-of-payment. Fares are enforced through random spot checks by contracted fare inspectors who are assisted by Metro's transit police. Coaches feature racks for 3 bikes, Wi-Fi, and security cameras. RapidRide buses have fewer seats than similar articulated buses in Metro's fleet, allowing for more room for standing riders, which increases the total number of passengers the bus can carry.

Coaches were the first to feature on-board automated announcements and signage that inform riders of the next available stop as the vehicle approaches. Metro has since deployed the same technology to all buses in the fleet.

In 2010, New Flyer discontinued the "Advanced BRT" styling (DE60LFA) that was purchased for the coaches running the A Line. Later coaches were ordered with New Flyer's "Restyled" package (DE60LFR) and include one passive restraint for wheelchair users.

In 2023, buses on the A and E lines were equipped with monitoring pumps to detect fumes from narcotics, including fentanyl, to study its effects onboard buses.

=== Fleet roster ===
Builder	Model	Image	Propulsion	Year	Fleet Series (Qty.)
New Flyer	DE60LFA		diesel-electric hybrid (parallel)	2009–2010	6000–6019 (20)
New Flyer	DE60LFR		diesel-electric hybrid (parallel)	2011	6020–6035 (16)
New Flyer	DE60LFR		diesel-electric hybrid (parallel)	2012	6040–6073 (34)
New Flyer	DE60LFR		diesel-electric hybrid (parallel)	2013	6075–6117 (43)
New Flyer	Xcelsior XDE60		diesel-electric hybrid (series)	2015	6200–6219 (20)
New Flyer	Xcelsior XDE60		diesel-electric hybrid (series)	2018	6220–6241 (22)
New Flyer	Xcelsior XDE60		diesel-electric hybrid (series)	2019	6242–6269 (28)
New Flyer	Xcelsior XDE60		diesel-electric hybrid (series)	2023	6400-6412 (13)
