= RapidRide F Line =

Bus rapid transit route in King County, Washington

F Line

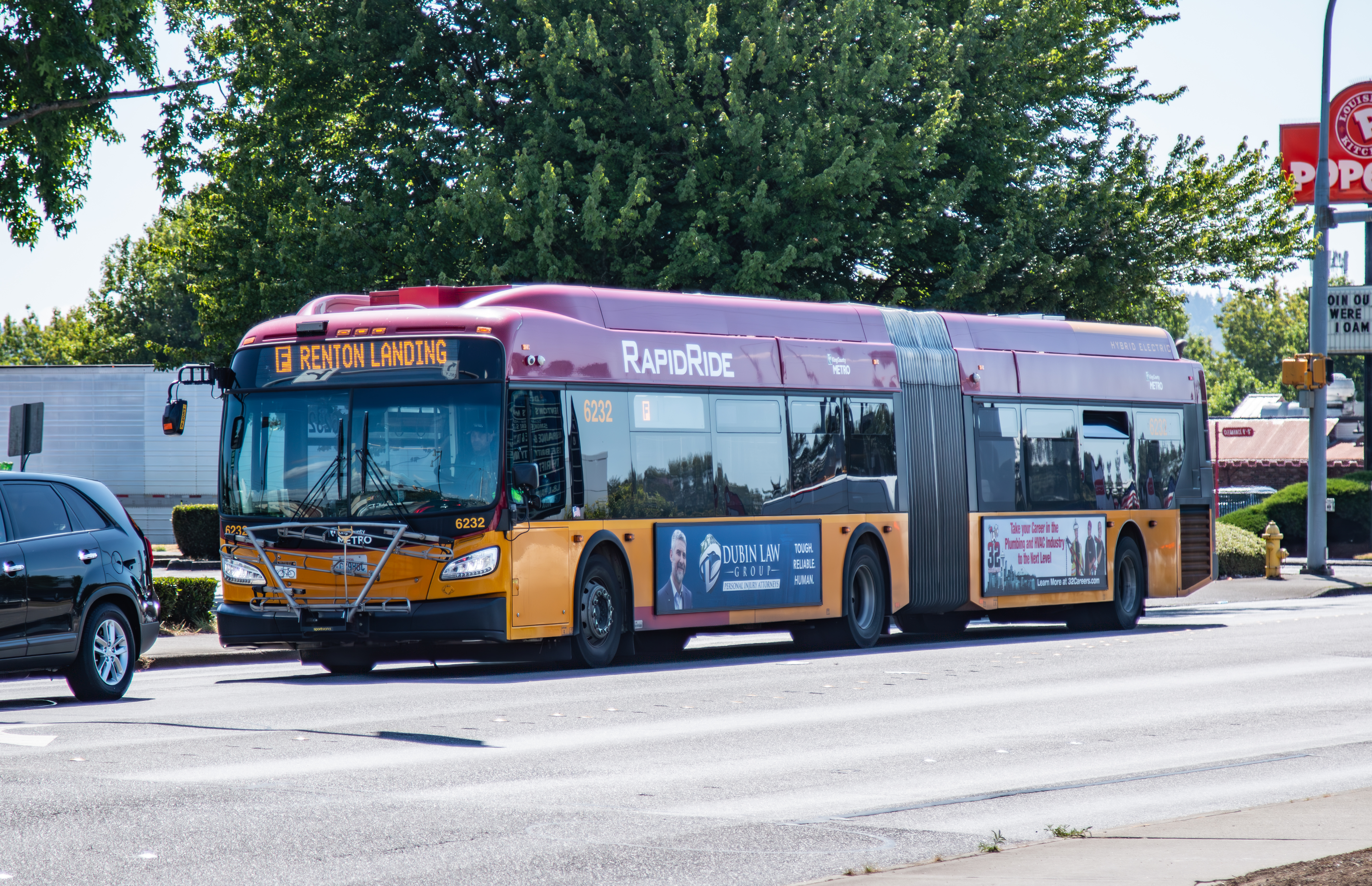
- RapidRide F line bus in Renton

Overview
- System: RapidRide
- Operator: King County Metro
- Garage: Tukwila Base
- Vehicle: Gillig Low Floor Plus EV 40
- Began service: June 7, 2014
- Predecessors: Routes 110, 140

Route
- Locale: King County
- Communities served: Burien, SeaTac, Tukwila, Renton
- Landmarks served: Tukwila International Boulevard station, Southcenter Mall, Tukwila station, South Renton Park and Ride, Renton Transit Center, Boeing Renton Factory
- Start: Burien Transit Center
- Via: 4th Ave SW; SW 156th St; S 154th St; Southcenter Blvd; Andover Park W Strander Blvd; West Valley Hwy; Oakesdale Ave SW; SW 16th St; Lind Ave SW; SW 7th St; Rainier Ave S S 2nd St/S 3rd St; Logan Ave N
- End: The Landing in Renton
- Length: 12.8 miles (20.6 km)

Service
- Frequency: Peak: 10 minutes Off-peak: 15 minutes Nights: 30 minutes
- Weekend frequency: 15 minutes (most times)
- Journey time: 55 minutes
- Operates: Weekdays: 4:45 am - 12:00 am Weekends: 6:00 am - 12:00 am
- Ridership: 5,600 (June 2015)
- Timetable: F Line timetable
- Map: F Line map

The F Line is one of eight RapidRide lines (routes with some bus rapid transit features) operated by King County Metro in King County, Washington. The F Line began service on June 7, 2014, running between the Burien Transit Center and "The Landing" in north Renton. Other major stops and destinations served include Tukwila International Boulevard Link Station, Southcenter Mall, Tukwila Sounder/Amtrak Station, South Renton Park and Ride, Renton Transit Center and the Boeing Renton Factory. Unlike most of the RapidRide lines, the F Line does not offer scheduled service during late-night and early morning hours.

== History ==
This corridor was previously served by Metro routes 110 and 140, with the latter carrying 3,500 riders on an average weekday in April 2014 With the implementation of RapidRide, the corridor saw an overall 69 percent increase in service, and ridership has grown 47 percent, with the F Line serving an average of 5,600 riders on weekdays in June 2015.

== Service ==
Headways
Time	Monday-Friday	Weekend/Holidays
4:45 am – 6:00 am	15	No Service
6:00 am – 8:00 am	10	30
8:00 am – 9:00 am	10	15
9:00 am – 3:00 pm	15	15
3:00 pm – 6:00 pm	10	15
6:00 pm – 8:00 pm	15	15
8:00 pm – 12:00 am	30	30
12:00 am – 4:45 am	No Service	No Service

All times are estimated headways.
