= RapidRide C Line =

Bus rapid transit route in Seattle, Washington

C Line

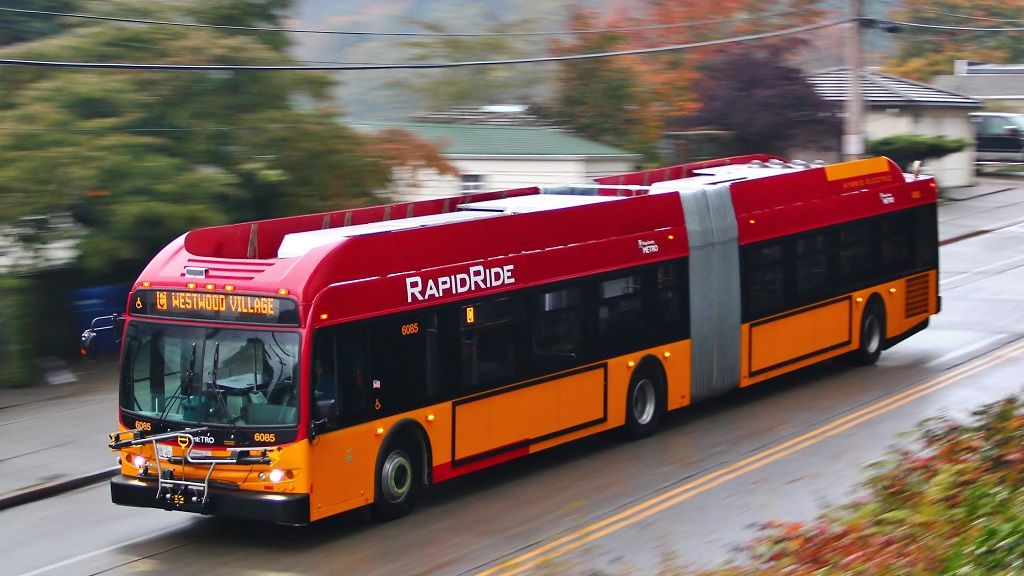
- C Line bus en route to West Seattle, 2013

Overview
- System: RapidRide
- Operator: King County Metro
- Garage: Ryerson Base
- Vehicle: New Flyer articulated buses
- Began service: September 29, 2012
- Predecessors: Route 54, 54X

Route
- Locale: King County
- Communities served: South Lake Union; Downtown Seattle; West Seattle; Fauntleroy; Westwood
- Landmarks served: Lake Union Park; Alaska Junction; Morgan Junction; Fauntleroy Ferry Terminal
- Start: South Lake Union
- Via: Westlake Ave N 3rd Avenue; Alaskan Way Viaduct; West Seattle Bridge; California Ave SW; Fauntleroy Way SW
- End: Westwood Village
- Length: 12 miles (19 km)

Service
- Frequency: Peak: 6-8 minutes Off-peak: 12-15 minutes Late night: 30-75 minutes
- Weekend frequency: Saturday: 12-15 minutes (most times); Sunday: 15 minutes (most times)
- Journey time: 56 minutes
- Operates: 24 hours
- Ridership: 8,300 (weekday average, spring 2015)
- Timetable: C Line timetable
- Map: C Line map

The C Line is one of eight RapidRide lines (routes with some bus rapid transit features) operated by King County Metro in King County, Washington. The C Line began service on September 29, 2012, running between downtown Seattle, West Seattle, Fauntleroy and the Westwood Village Shopping Center in the Westwood neighborhood. The line runs mainly via Westlake Avenue, 3rd Avenue, Washington State Route 99, the West Seattle Bridge, California Avenue and Fauntleroy Way.

== History ==
This corridor was previously served by King County Metro routes 54 and 54 Express, which carried a combined average of 4,650 riders on weekdays during the last month in service. Since the implementation of RapidRide on the corridor, ridership has grown 79 percent and the C Line served an average of 8,300 riders on weekdays in spring 2015.

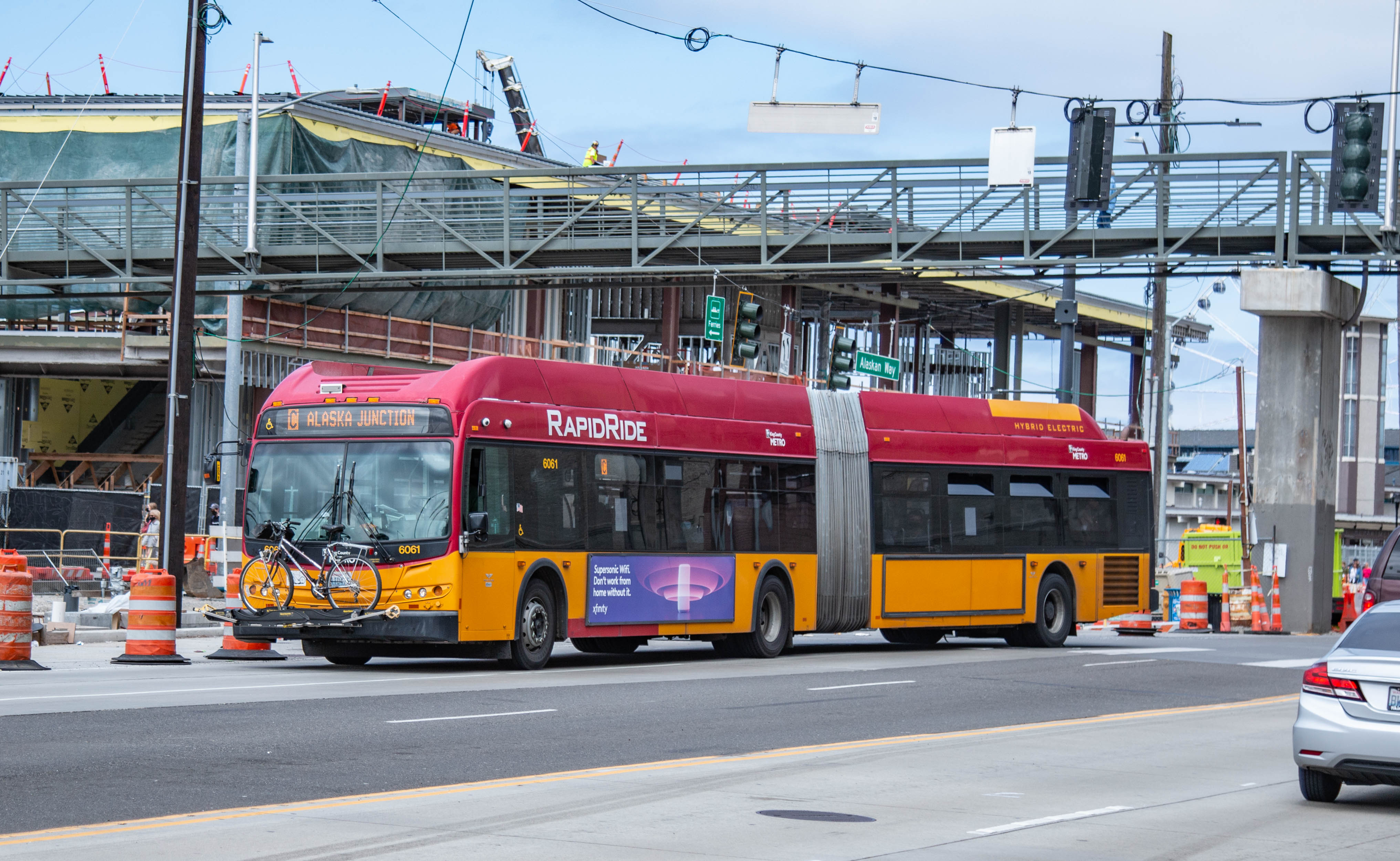
C Line bus at Alaskan Way and Columbia St, 2022

The C Line originally interlined with the D Line, which continued north from downtown to Lower Queen Anne, Interbay, and Ballard. The two routes were uncoupled during a service change on March 26, 2016, and the C Line was moved onto Westlake Avenue to terminate in South Lake Union, sharing several stops with the South Lake Union Streetcar.

The C Line originally accessed downtown via State Route 99 and the Alaskan Way Viaduct, using the Seneca Street and Columbia Street ramps. The viaduct closed on January 11, 2019, and the route was moved to a new alignment in SoDo using the SODO Busway and 4th Avenue. A new C Line stop serving the waterfront, at Alaskan Way and South Jackson Street, opened in February 2022.

== Service ==
Headways
Time	Weekdays	Saturday	Sunday/ Holidays
5:00 am – 6:00 am	15	15	15
6:00 am – 8:00 am	6-8	15	15
8:00 am – 9:00 am	6-8	12	15
9:00 am – 3:00 pm	12	12	15
3:00 pm – 6:00 pm	6-8	12	15
6:00 pm – 7:00 pm	10	12	15
7:00 pm – 11:00 pm	15	15	15
11:00 pm – 1:00 am	30	30	30
1:00 am – 5:00 am	60-75	60-75	60-75

== Improvements ==
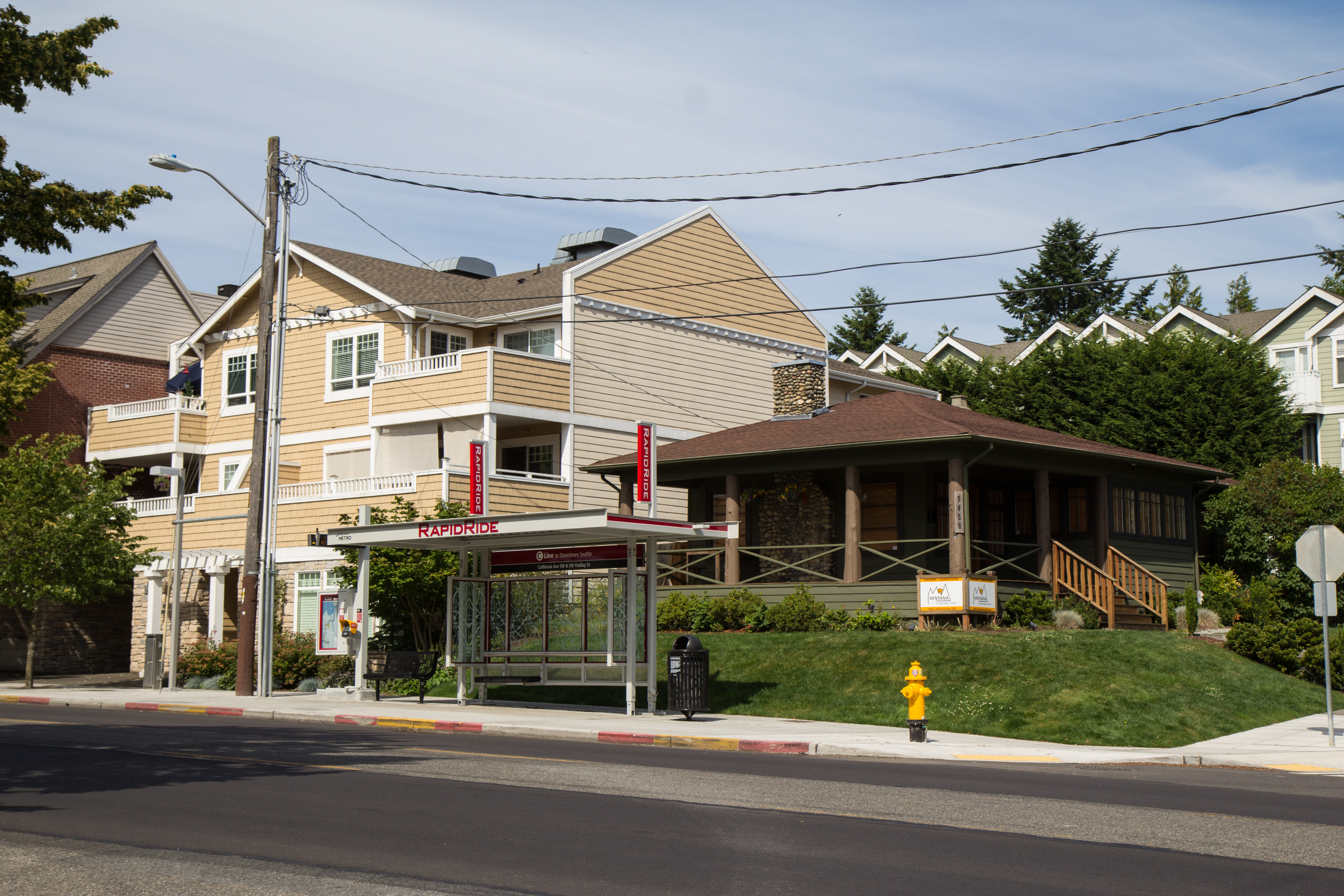
C Line stop in West Seattle

The city of Seattle made major improvements to the RapidRide C and D lines with money generated by Proposition 1 (which increases sales tax by 0.1 percent and imposes a $60 annual car-tab fee).

The first round of improvements came in June 2015 when headways on the RapidRide C and D lines were decreased. Buses will arrive every 7–8 minutes during weekday rush hour, every 12 minutes during the midday hours on weekdays, every 12 minutes during the daytime on Saturday and every 15 minutes on Sunday and during weekday and weekend nights.

The second round of improvements came in March 2016 when the RapidRide C and D lines were split apart. C Line buses now continue north through parts of Belltown and onto transit only lanes Westlake Avenue in the South Lake Union neighborhood, terminating on Valley Street near the Fred Hutchinson Cancer Research Center campus. D Line buses now continue south on 3rd Avenue into Pioneer Square, using layover space on 5th Avenue south of Terrace Street.
