= RapidRide D Line =

Bus rapid transit route in Seattle, Washington

D Line

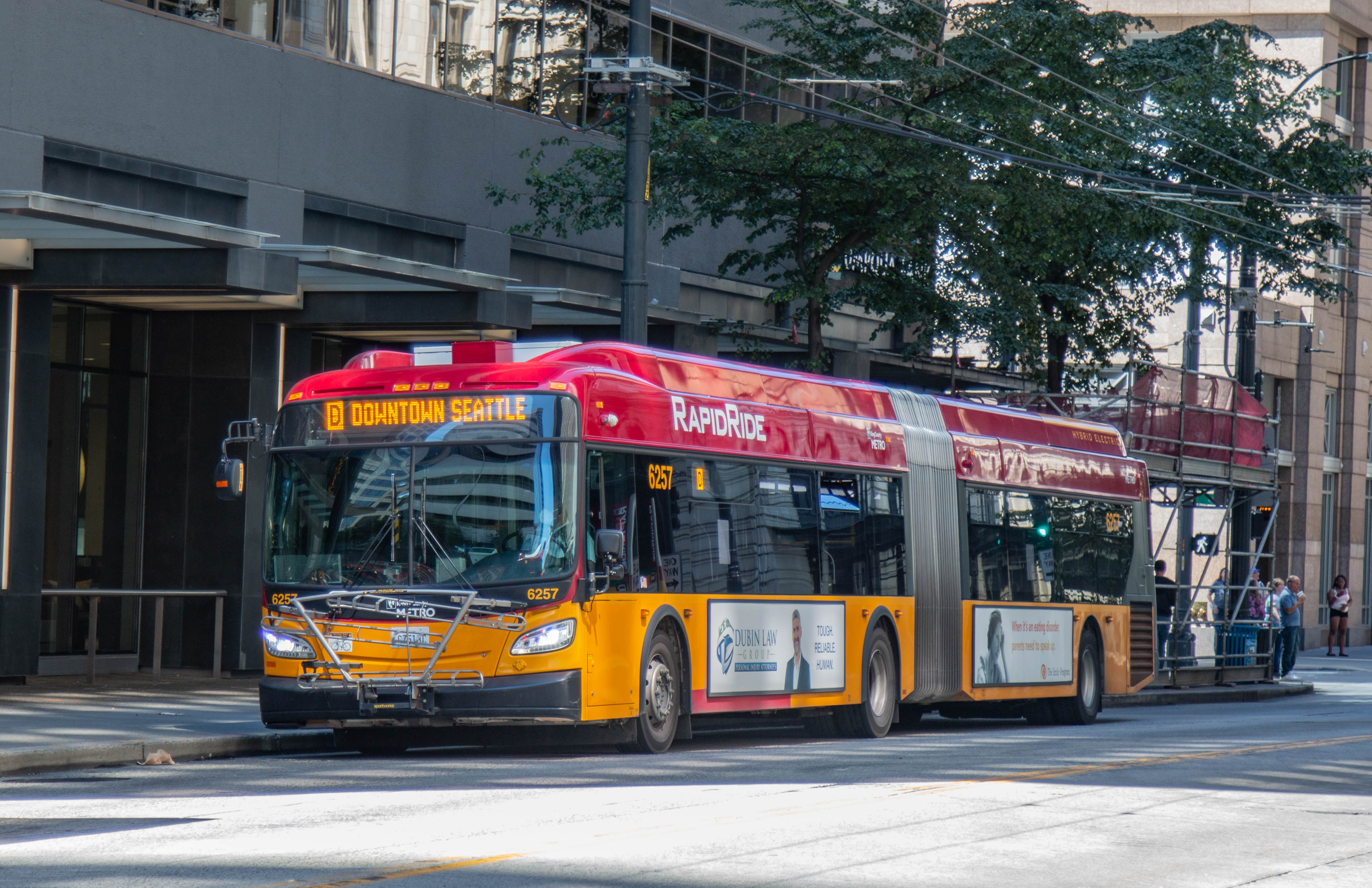
- D Line bus in Downtown Seattle

Overview
- System: RapidRide
- Operator: King County Metro
- Garage: North Base; Atlantic Base
- Vehicle: New Flyer articulated buses New Flyer XDE60
- Began service: September 29, 2012
- Predecessors: Route 15, 18

Route
- Locale: King County
- Communities served: Crown Hill, Ballard, Interbay, Uptown, Downtown Seattle
- Landmarks served: Ballard High School, Fishermans Terminal, Seattle Center
- Start: Crown Hill
- Via: Holman Road NW; 15th Ave NW; 15th Ave W Elliott Ave W W Mercer St; Queen Anne Ave N/1st Ave N 3rd Ave
- End: Downtown Seattle
- Length: 8.8 miles (14.2 km)

Service
- Frequency: Peak: 7-8 minutes Off-peak: 12-15 minutes Late night: 30-75 minutes
- Weekend frequency: Saturday: 12-15 minutes (most times); Sunday: 15 minutes (most times)
- Journey time: 43 minutes
- Operates: 24 hours
- Ridership: 11,700 (weekday average, spring 2015)
- Timetable: D Line timetable
- Map: D Line map

The D Line is one of eight RapidRide lines (routes with some bus rapid transit features) operated by King County Metro in King County, Washington. The line runs via Holman Road NW, 15th Ave NW, 15th Ave W, Elliott Ave W, W Mercer Pl, Queen Anne Ave N / 1st Ave N and 3rd Ave.

== History ==
This corridor was previously served by Metro routes 15 and 18, which carried a combined average of 7,630 riders on weekdays during the last month in service.

On September 29, 2012 (13 years ago), the D Line began service, running between Carkeek Park in Crown Hill, Ballard, Interbay, Uptown, and downtown Seattle.

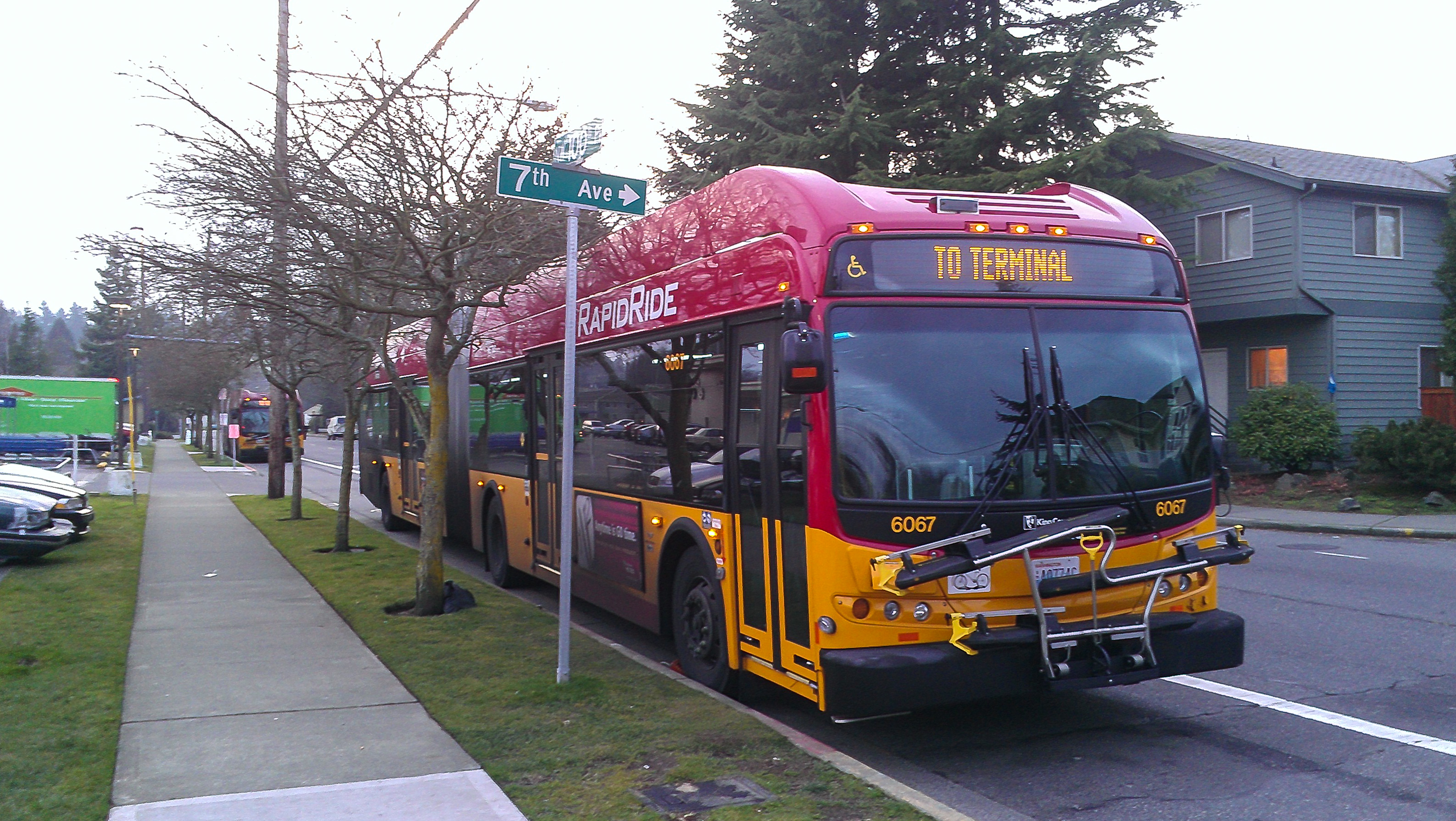
D Line buses at their northern terminal near Carkeek Park.

In 2014, the city of Seattle planned major improvements to the RapidRide C and D lines after their opening with funds generated by Proposition 1 (which increased sales tax by 0.1 percent and imposed a $60 annual car-tab fee).

In June 2015, the first improvements came when headways on the RapidRide C and D lines were improved. Buses arrive every 7–8 minutes during weekday rush hour; every 12 minutes during midday hours on weekdays, and during the daytime on Saturday; and every 15 minutes on Sundays and during all nights.

Since the implementation of RapidRide on the corridor, ridership has grown 53 percent, and the D Line served an average of 11,700 riders on weekdays in spring 2015.

Prior to March 2016, the D Line was through-routed with the C Line, with buses continuing to West Seattle from downtown.

In March 2016, the city split the previously interlined RapidRide C and D lines apart after additional funding for the two routes was approved. C Line buses now continue north through Belltown onto Westlake Avenue in the South Lake Union neighborhood, terminating on Valley Street near the Fred Hutchinson Cancer Research Center campus. D Line buses instead continue south on 3rd Avenue into Pioneer Square, using layover space on 5th Avenue south of Terrace Street.

== Service ==
Headways
Time	Weekdays	Saturday	Sunday/ Holidays
5:00 am – 6:00 am	15	15	15
6:00 am – 8:00 am	7-8	15	15
8:00 am – 9:00 am	7-8	12	15
9:00 am – 3:00 pm	12	12	15
3:00 pm – 6:00 pm	7–8	12	15
6:00 pm – 7:00 pm	10	12	15
7:00 pm – 12:00 am	15	15	15
12:00 am – 1:00 am	30	30	30
1:00 am – 5:00 am	60-75	60-75	60–75
