= RapidRide E Line =

Bus rapid transit route in Seattle, Washington

E Line

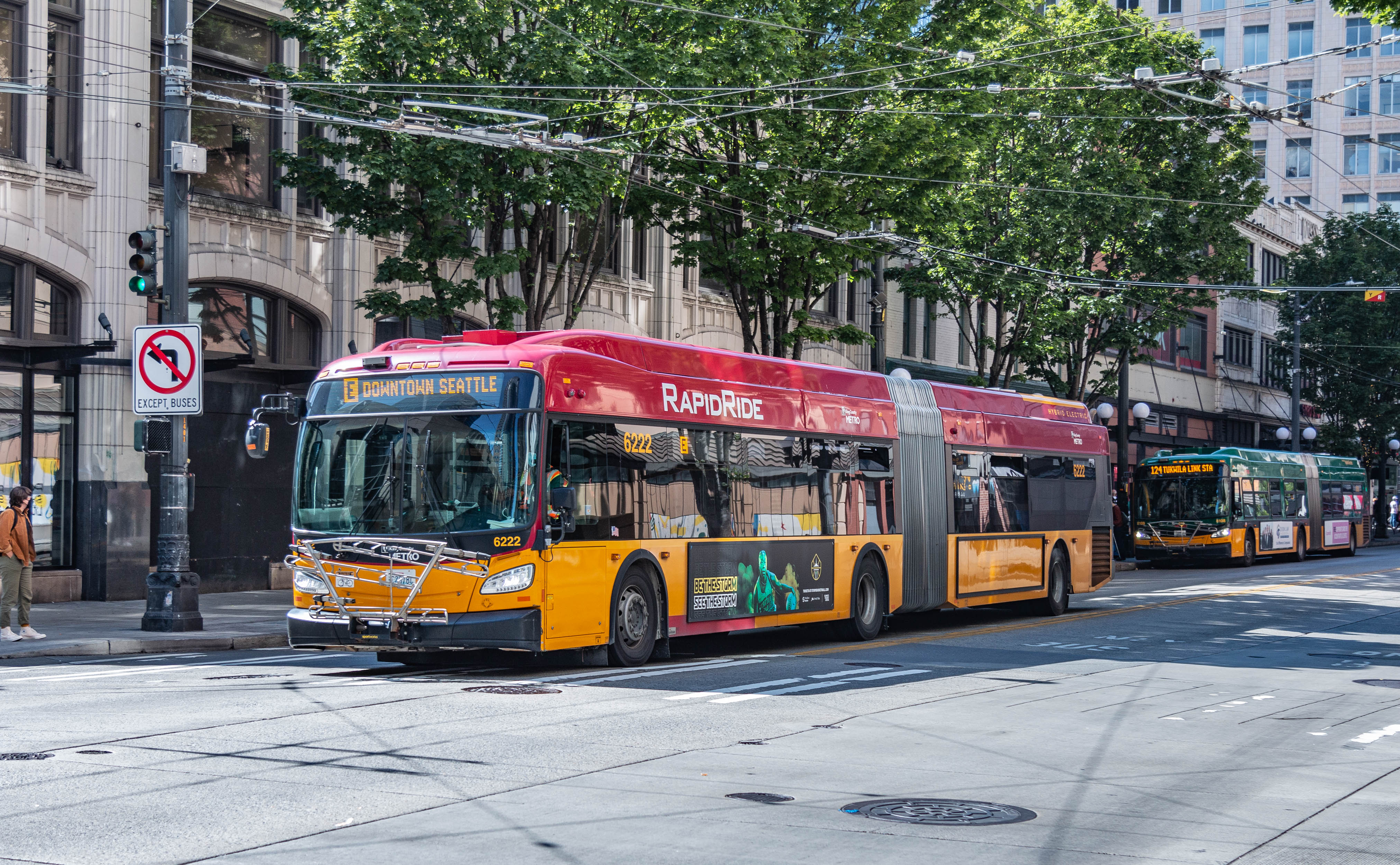
- RapidRide E Line bus on 3rd Avenue in Downtown Seattle

Overview
- System: RapidRide
- Operator: King County Metro
- Garage: North Base
- Vehicle: New Flyer articulated buses New Flyer XDE60
- Began service: February 15, 2014
- Predecessors: Route 359, 358X

Route
- Locale: King County
- Start: Aurora Village Transit Center, Shoreline
- Via: Aurora Avenue N 3rd Ave
- End: Pioneer Square, Downtown Seattle
- Length: 12.5 miles (20.1 km)

Service
- Frequency: Peak: 5-12 minutes Off-peak: 10-15 minutes Early morning & night: 24-60 minutes
- Weekend frequency: 15 minutes (most times)
- Journey time: 1 hour, 2 minutes
- Operates: 4:30 am-3:00 am
- Ridership: 15,800 (weekday average, spring 2015)
- Timetable: E Line timetable
- Map: E Line map

The RapidRide E Line is one of eight RapidRide lines (limited-stop routes with some bus rapid transit features) operated by King County Metro in King County, Washington. The E Line began service on February 15, 2014, running from Aurora Village Transit Center in Shoreline to Pioneer Square in Downtown Seattle. The line runs primarily on Aurora Avenue North (State Route 99) and 3rd Avenue. The line's northern terminus connects to the Swift Blue Line operated by Community Transit, which continues north on State Route 99 to Everett Station.

== History ==
Bus service to Aurora Village began in 1979, with the extension of Metro Transit's route 6 to the Aurora Village Shopping Center in Shoreline, on the King–Snohomish county line. The Aurora Village Transit Center, the route's current terminal, opened in the shopping center's south parking lot in March 1985. Additional service was added with route 359, an express variation of route 6.

=== Aurora Bridge shooting ===
On November 27, 1998, Mark McLaughlin, the driver of a southbound bus on route 359, was shot and killed by passenger Silas Garfield Cool as the bus was entering the Aurora Bridge. The passenger then shot himself as the bus careened off the bridge and landed on an apartment building in the Fremont neighborhood, over which the bridge passes before it crosses the Fremont Cut of the Lake Washington Ship Canal. McLaughlin, the attacker, and one other bus passenger died in the crash, and 32 passengers were injured.

The Amalgamated Transit Union organized a memorial service for McLaughlin at KeyArena on December 8. The service was preceded by a procession of buses, including Metro buses and other operators from around the Pacific Northwest, including from British Columbia. King County Metro honors McLaughlin yearly on the Friday after Thanksgiving, when buses pull over and briefly pause service in his memory.

=== 1999–2013: Route 358X ===
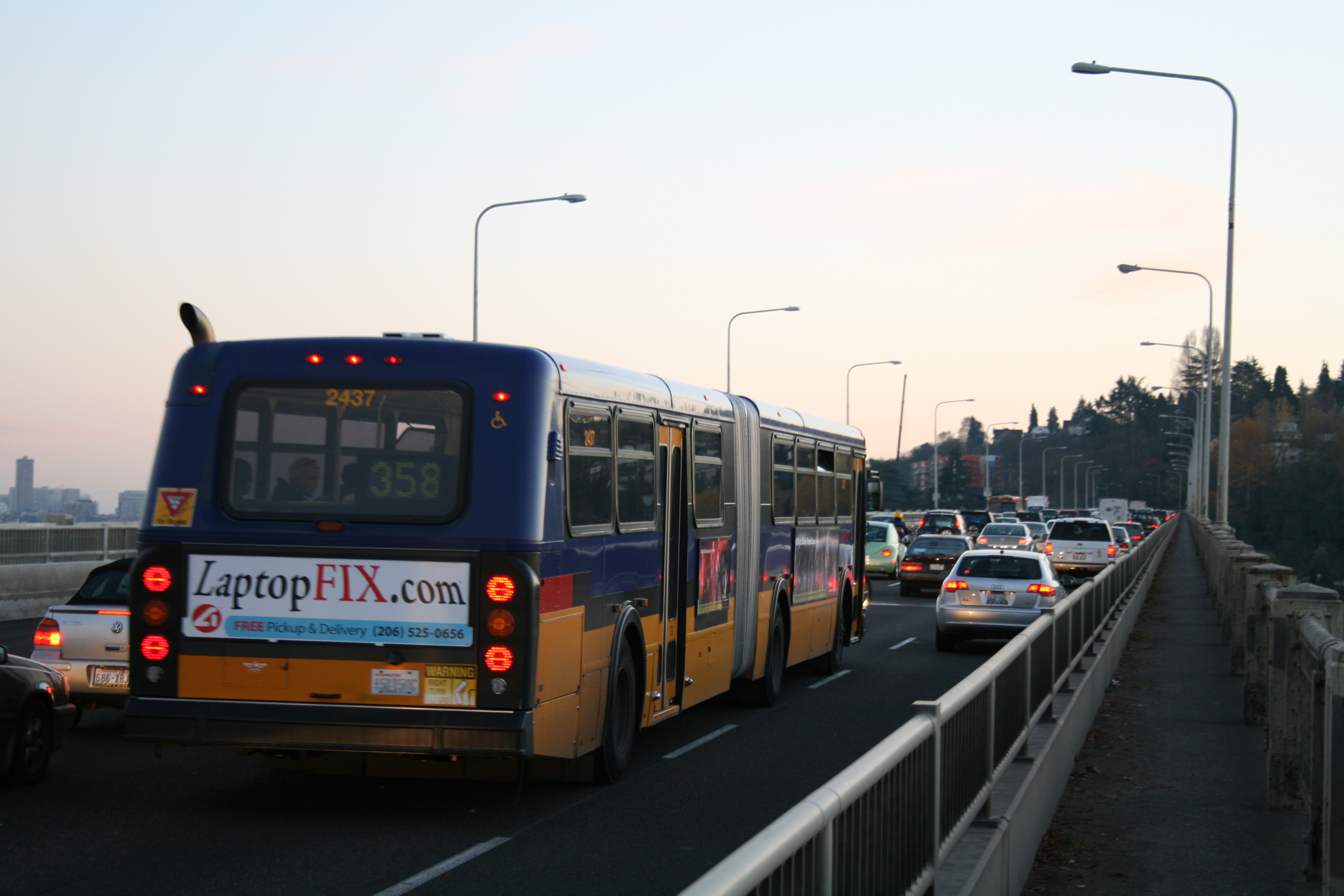
Route 358 bus on the Aurora Bridge in 2007

In response to the incident and the general unsavory reputation the route had experienced even prior to the incident, route 359 was retired and replaced three months later by route 358. The new route 358 also replaced portions of routes 6 and 360, which were also retired. In 2005, Metro began installing "crowns" atop bus shelters on Aurora Avenue to commemorate the installation of transit signal priority at intersections and other service improvements for route 358.

Safety issues persisted on the corridor; in 2011, drivers on route 358 wrote up 333 "security incident reports", leading the Seattle Weekly to give the route the title of "Most Dangerous Bus Route in Seattle" After route 358 was replaced by the RapidRide E Line, security cameras were installed on all RapidRide buses and lighting was improved at stations, in part to address this problem.

=== 2013–present: RapidRide development ===
In early 2013 King County Metro began construction on new enhanced bus stops, new bus stations and making upgrades to traffic signals along Aurora Ave N. Service on the RapidRide E Line was scheduled to start in Fall 2013 but the opening was delayed until February 15, 2014, to give crews more time to finish construction.

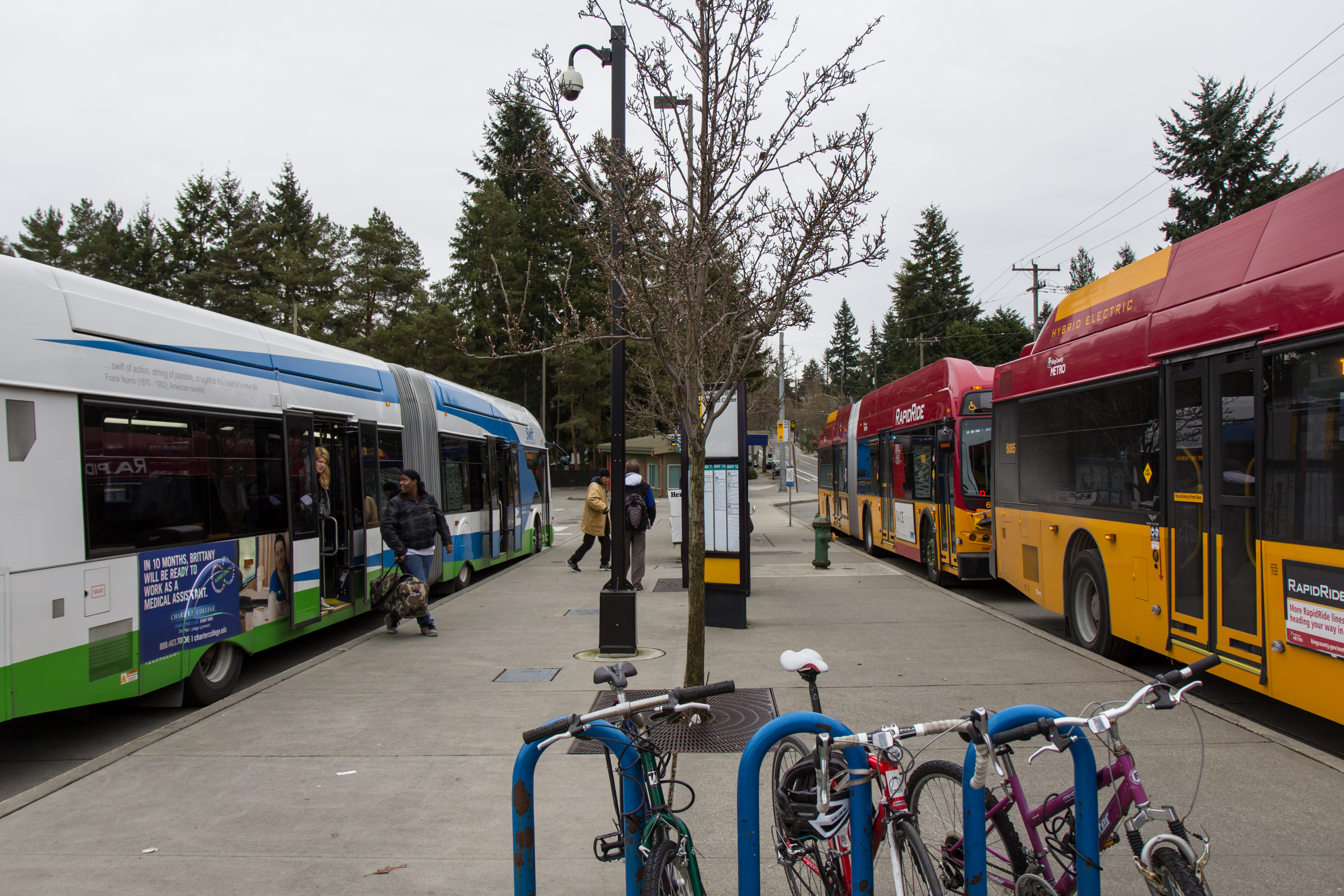
E Line buses (right) and Swift Blue Line (left)at Aurora Village Transit Center in 2014

The only change made to the routing during the conversion to RapidRide was in Green Lake. Route 358 exited Highway 99 to serve stops on Linden Ave N, but a new bus stop on Aurora Ave N allows southbound buses to stay on the highway (northbound buses must still deviate).

King County Metro planned to begin service on the RapidRide E Line in September 2013, but the opening was pushed back several months to February 2014 due to delays in construction.

Before its conversion to RapidRide, route 358 carried 11,730 passengers per weekday on average. After the introduction of the E Line, ridership increased to 15,800 riders per weekday in spring 2015, the most of any Metro bus route. In 2023, the E Line carried 3.7 million total passengers.

In July of 2025 SDOT added 24/7 bus lanes along the Aurora Ave corridor to assist with on-time performance of the route.

== Service ==
Headways
Time	Monday-Friday	Weekend/Holidays
4:30 am – 6:00 am	25	20
6:00 am – 9:45 am	5-10 (inbound); 12 (outbound)	12
9:45 am – 4:00 pm	10	12
4:00 pm – 6:15 pm	5-10 (outbound); 12 (inbound)	15
6:15 pm – 8:00 pm	12	15
8:00 pm – 11:00 pm	20	20
11:00 pm – 12:30 am	30	30
12:30 am – 3:00 am	60	60
