= Westwood, Seattle =

Neighborhood in Seattle, Washington, U.S.

Coordinates: 47°31′35″N 122°22′03″W

Westwood is a neighborhood in Seattle, Washington, United States. It is located in the southwest part of the city known as West Seattle, close to the neighboring CDP of White Center. Westwood is known for its International Baccalaureate high school, Chief Sealth High.

== Location ==
The area is so named because of the huge copses of elm and maple trees in the area, especially along Elmgrove between 35th and 27th.

The neighborhood is bounded by Roxhill and Arbor Heights to the south, Highpoint to the north, Delridge to the east and Fauntleroy and Gatewood to the west.

== Civic services and issues ==
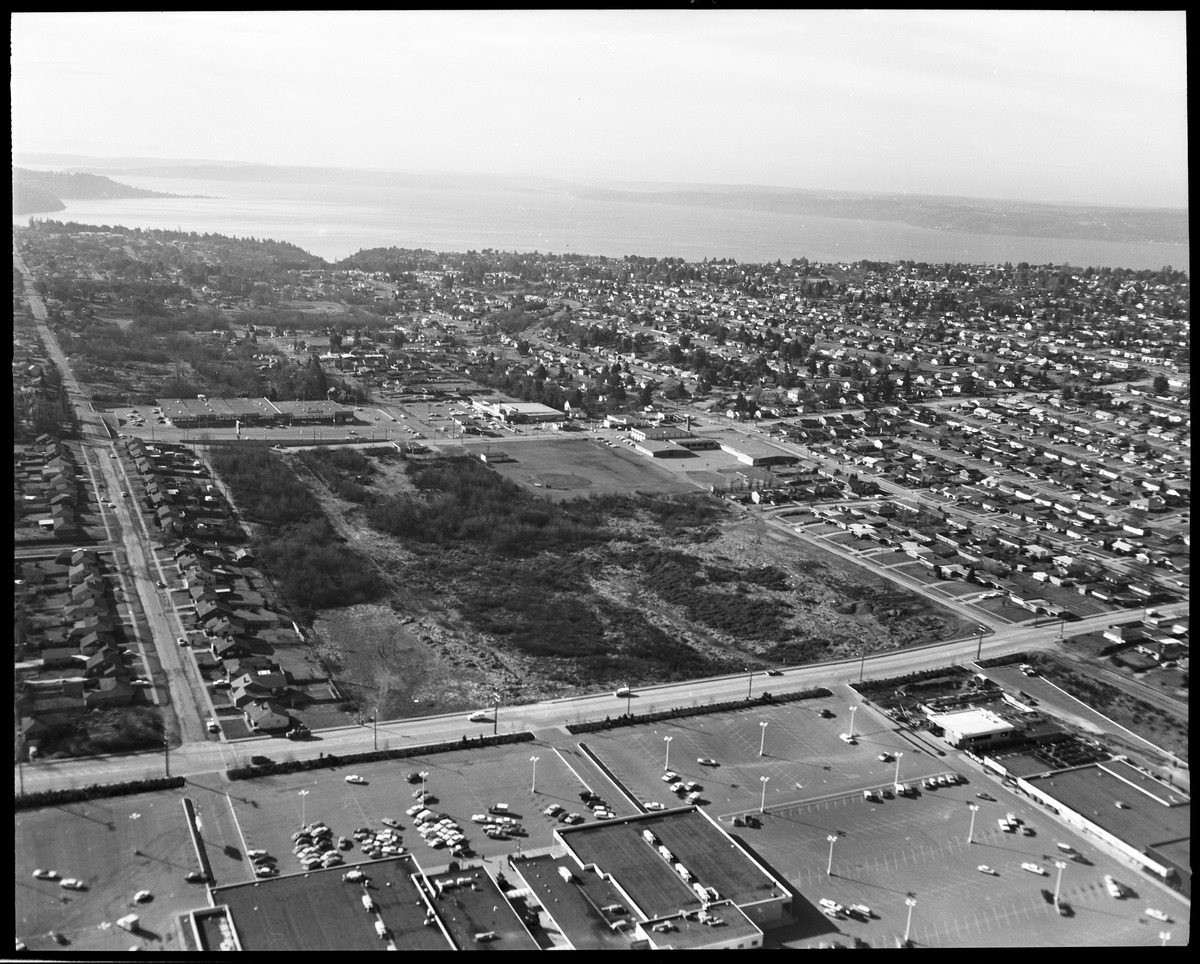
An aerial view of the area in 1969; Westwood is in the foreground

King County Metro bus routes link Westwood, Delridge, and Thistle with the rest of Seattle. It is the terminus of the RapidRide C Line.

== Landmarks and Recreation ==
Westwood is home to numerous parks and greenspaces. Nearby landmarks include the Southwest Pool and Sports Complex, Westwood Village, and Chief Sealth High School. The school was designated an International high school in 2010 (with Denny Middle School receiving the same designation as a middle school). Its curriculum includes languages and multi-cultural education.

Popular nearby attractions include Lincoln Park and Colman Pool, a heated saltwater swimming pool on the banks of Puget Sound.
