= Lower Queen Anne, Seattle =

Coordinates: 47°37′30″N 122°21′33″W

Uptown (Lower Queen Anne)
- Neighborhood
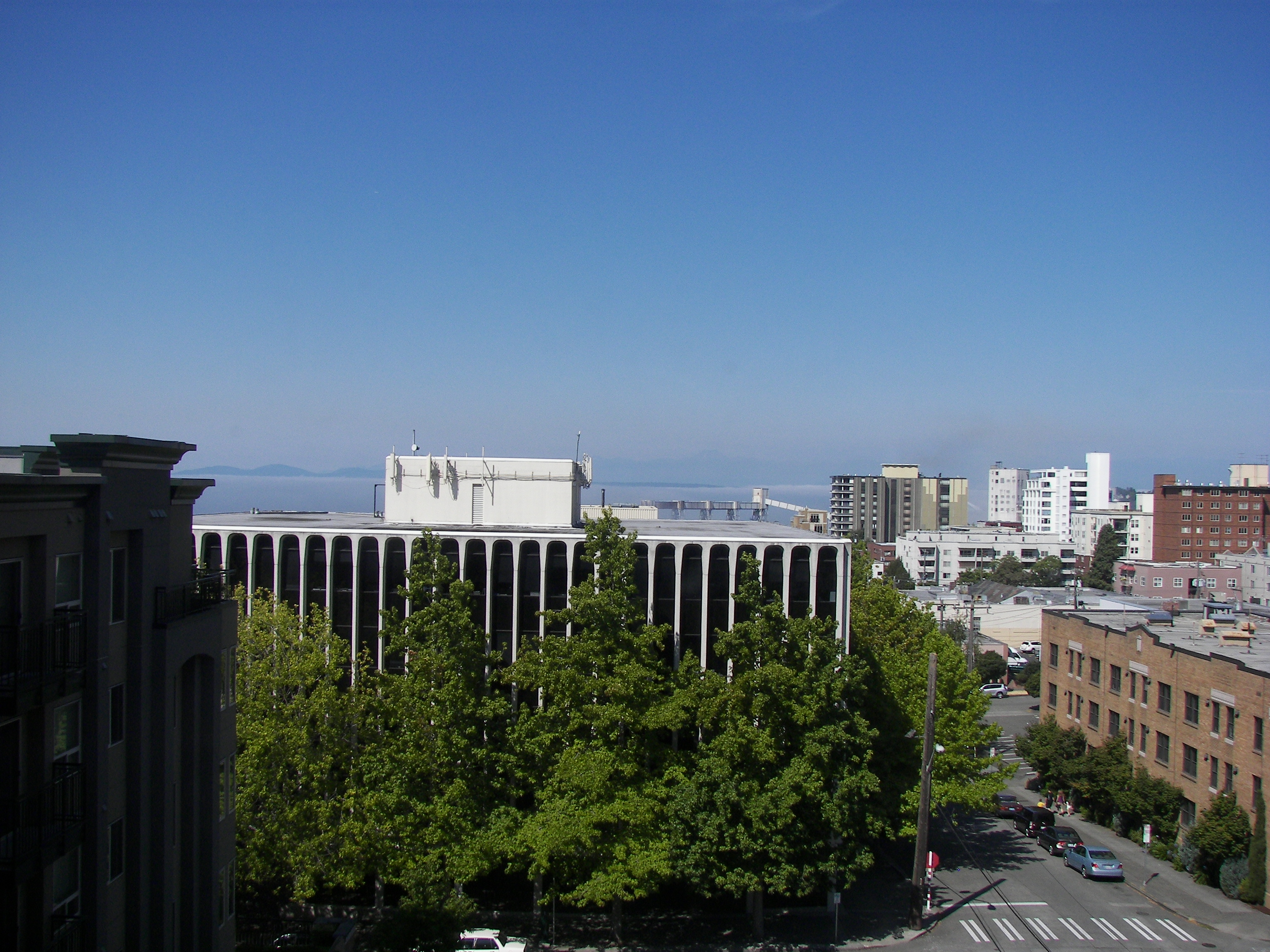
- View of Lower Queen Anne from Queen Anne Ave. N. and W. Republican St.

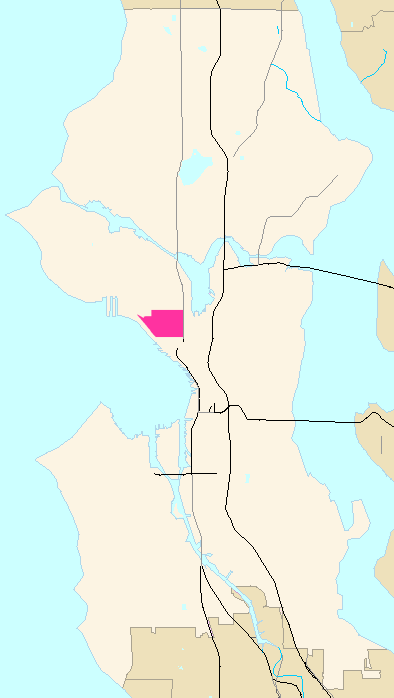
- Map of Uptown's location in Seattle
- City: Seattle

Area
  - Total: 0.62 sq mi (1.60 km^{2})

Population
  - Total: 10,765
  - Density: 7,969/sq mi (3,077/km^{2})

Lower Queen Anne is a neighborhood in northwestern Seattle, Washington, at the base of Queen Anne Hill. While its boundaries are not precise, the toponym usually refers to the shopping, office, and residential districts to the north and west of Seattle Center. The neighborhood is connected to Upper Queen Anne—the shopping district at the top of the hill—by an extremely steep section of Queen Anne Avenue N. known as the Counterbalance, in memory of the cable cars that once ran up and down it.

In early April 2021, the Seattle City Council officially recognized the name of the area as Uptown.

While neither Lower Queen Anne nor Uptown is often used to refer to the grounds of Seattle Center itself, most of Seattle Center is in the neighborhood, including Climate Pledge Arena (home of the Seattle Storm of the WNBA, the Seattle Torrent of the PWHL, and the Seattle Kraken of the NHL), the Exhibition Hall, McCaw Hall (home of the Seattle Opera and Pacific Northwest Ballet), the Cornish Playhouse (home of the Intiman Summer Theatre Festival and Cornish College of the Arts), the Bagley Wright Theater (home of Seattle Repertory Theatre), and the studios for KEXP radio.

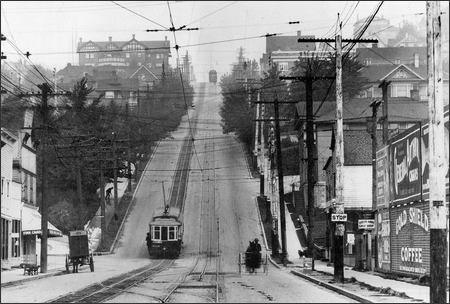
Cable car on the Counterbalance section of Queen Anne Hill

Lower Queen Anne also has a three-screen movie theater, the SIFF Cinema Uptown, and On the Boards, a center for avant-garde theater and music.

== Geography ==
Lower Queen Anne can be considered either a distinct neighborhood, or part of the larger Queen Anne neighborhood. Although the borders of Lower Queen Anne are not clearly defined, they usually include the area from Ward St. to Denny Way. Additionally, the area from the intersection of W. Galer St. and 5th Ave W. to W Prospect St. and Queen Anne Ave. N. are also usually considered part of the Lower Queen Anne area. However, as no borders for neighborhoods in the city of Seattle have been clearly defined, the boundaries of Lower Queen Anne remain merely set by popular opinion.

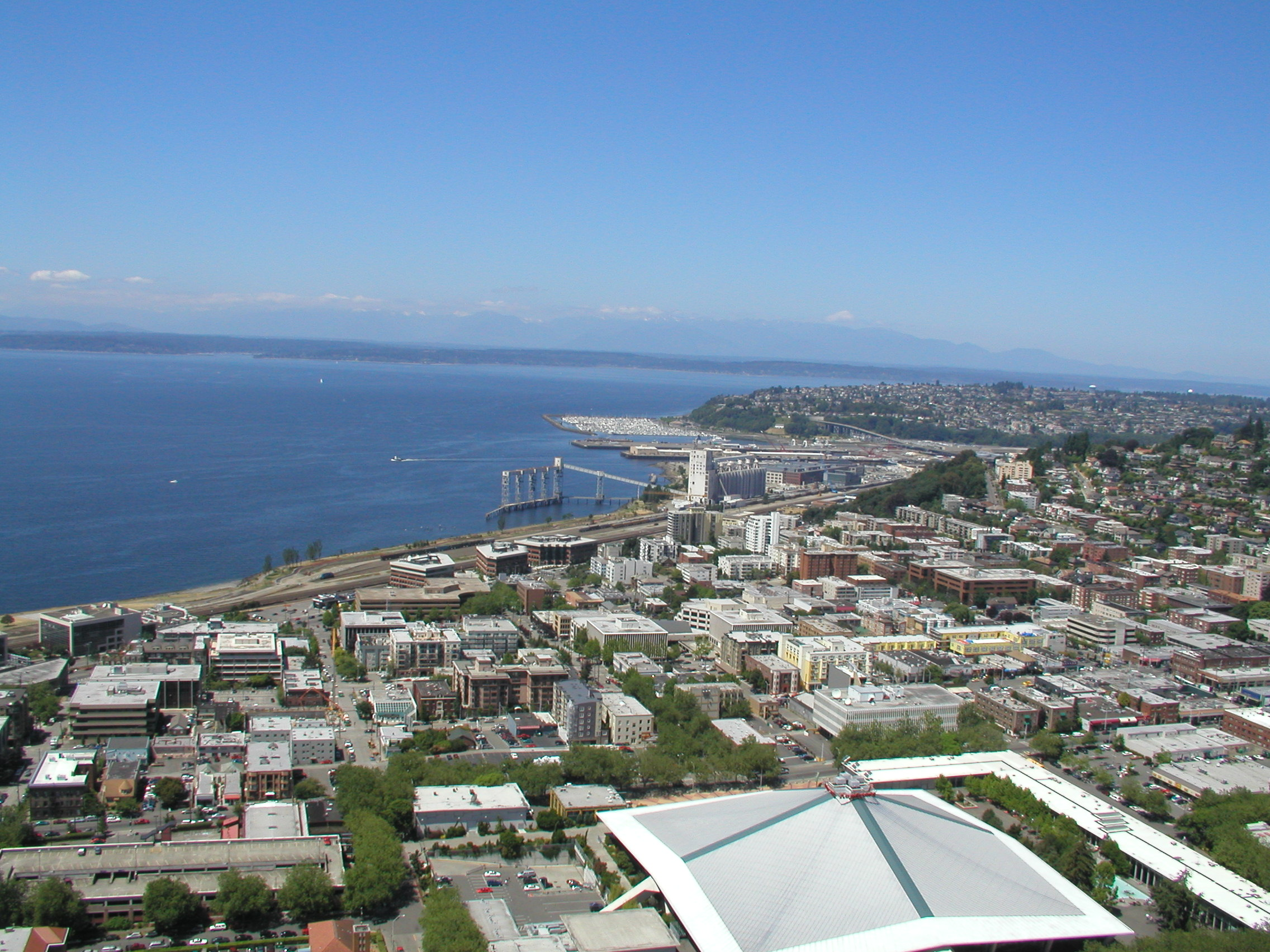
Lower Queen Anne, with Climate Pledge Arena in the bottom right, as seen from the Space Needle

== Transit ==
The Seattle Center Monorail, the city's only monorail line, runs from Lower Queen Anne to Downtown. King County Metro operates several bus routes that travel through the neighborhood, including the RapidRide D Line.

== Economy ==
The Seattle-based newspaper known as the Seattle Post-Intelligencer was located in Lower Queen Anne. Local radio station KEXP-FM moved its headquarters to Lower Queen Anne in a building adjacent to the Climate Pledge Arena in December 2015.

The neighborhood is also home to numerous high-tech companies. The corporate headquarters of F5 Networks was located in Lower Queen Anne until it was moved to F5 Tower. It is the home of business texting startup Zipwhip. It was the home of Quicksoft, the first company to score commercial success with shareware. Prior to its dissolution, Pro Air was also headquartered in Lower Queen Anne. Outreach, a sales software company, moved their offices to Lower Queen Anne in 2018, filling a space previously held by Big Fish Games.

Lower Queen Anne is home to many restaurants.
