= List of King County Metro facilities =

King County Metro is the public transit authority of King County, Washington, including the city of Seattle in the Puget Sound region. It operates a fleet of 1,396 buses, serving 115 million rides at over 8,000 bus stops in 2012, making it the eighth-largest transit agency in the United States. The agency has eight bases spread throughout its 2,134-square-mile (5,530 km^{2}) operating area and has 131 park and rides for commuters.

== Bases ==
Name		Image	Location	Year opened	Notes
Central Campus	Atlantic Base		1555 Airport Way S, Seattle	1941	Only base that serves electric trolley buses
Central Campus	Atlantic Maintenance		1555 Airport Way South, Seattle		
Central Campus	Central Base		640 S Massachusetts St, Seattle	1941	
Central Campus	Central/Atlantic/Ryerson Operations		1270 6th Ave S, Seattle		
Central Campus	Communications Control Center		1505 6th Ave S, Seattle	2007	
Central Campus	Marketing Distribution Center		1523 6th Ave South, Seattle		
Central Campus	Power Distribution		2255 4th Avenue South, Seattle		
Central Campus	Ryerson Base		1220 4th Ave S, Seattle	1987	Named for the Ryerson steel mill that formerly occupied the site.
Central Campus	Tire and Millwright Shop		1555 Airport Way South, Seattle		
East Campus	Bellevue Base		1790 124th Ave NE, Bellevue	1983	
East Campus	East Base		1975 124 Ave NE, Bellevue	1977	
South Campus	South Base		12100 East Marginal Way S, Tukwila	1978	More coaches here than any other base (as of September 2003).
South Campus	Tukwila Base		Tukwila	2026	Up to 120 battery electric buses
South Campus	Component Supply Center		12200 East Marginal Way South, Tukwila		
Training and Safety Center		King County Metro Safety & Training Center Sign	3401 S Norfolk St, Seattle, WA 98118		Operator training, new equipment qualifications, and retraining.
North Base			2160 N 163rd St, Shoreline	1992	Built mostly underground

Atlantic, Central, and Ryerson Bases are located close together near Stadium Station in SODO and are known as the Central Campus. East and Bellevue bases comprise the East Campus and are located nearby each other in north Bellevue. The South and East transit facilities finished an ADA retrofit in 2001.

=== Other ===
Name	Image	Location	Year opened	Notes
Central Maintenance		640 South Massachusetts, Seattle		
Employee Parking Garage		1505 6th Avenue South, Seattle		
Redmond Van Pool Center		18655 NE Union Hill Road, Redmond	2002	Van Pool van storage
South Facilities		11911 East Marginal Way South, Tukwila		

== Transit centers ==
While Downtown Seattle is Metro's main transit hub, the transit centers act as smaller regional hubs and are served by many bus routes. Some transit centers also offer a park-and-ride facility. Metro operates out of several transit centers located throughout King County:

Image	Name	Location	Year opened	Notes
	Auburn Station	A St SW & 2nd St SW, Auburn	2000	
	Aurora Village Transit Center	1524 N 200th St, Shoreline	1985	
	Bellevue Transit Center	10850 NE 6th St, Bellevue	1985	Owned 51% by Sound Transit, 49% by Metro
	Burien Transit Center	14900 4th Avenue SW, Burien	2009	5 electric vehicle recharging stations
	Eastgate Park & Ride	14200 SE Eastgate Way, Eastgate	2004	3 electric vehicle recharging stations
	Federal Way Transit Center	31621 23rd Ave S, Federal Way	2006	
	Issaquah Transit Center	1050 17th Ave NW, Issaquah	2008	
	Issaquah Highlands Transit Center	1755 Highland Dr., Issaquah	2003 (interim lot)	
	Kent Station Transit Center	301 Railroad Ave N, Kent	2001	
	Kirkland Transit Center	3rd Street & Park Lane, Kirkland	1986	Renovated 2011
	Mount Baker Transit Center	2824 Rainier Ave S, Mount Baker, Seattle	2009	Connection to Mount Baker light rail station
	Northgate Transit Center	10200 1st Ave NE, Northgate, Seattle	1992	
	Overlake Transit Center	15590 NE 36th St, Overlake	2002	
	Redmond Transit Center	16160 NE 83rd St, Redmond	2008	
	Renton Transit Center	S 2nd St & Burnett Ave S, Renton	2001	
	Totem Lake Transit Center	120th Ave NE & NE 128th St, Kirkland	2008	At Evergreen Medical Center
