= Route 41 (King County Metro) =

Urban bus route in Seattle, Washington

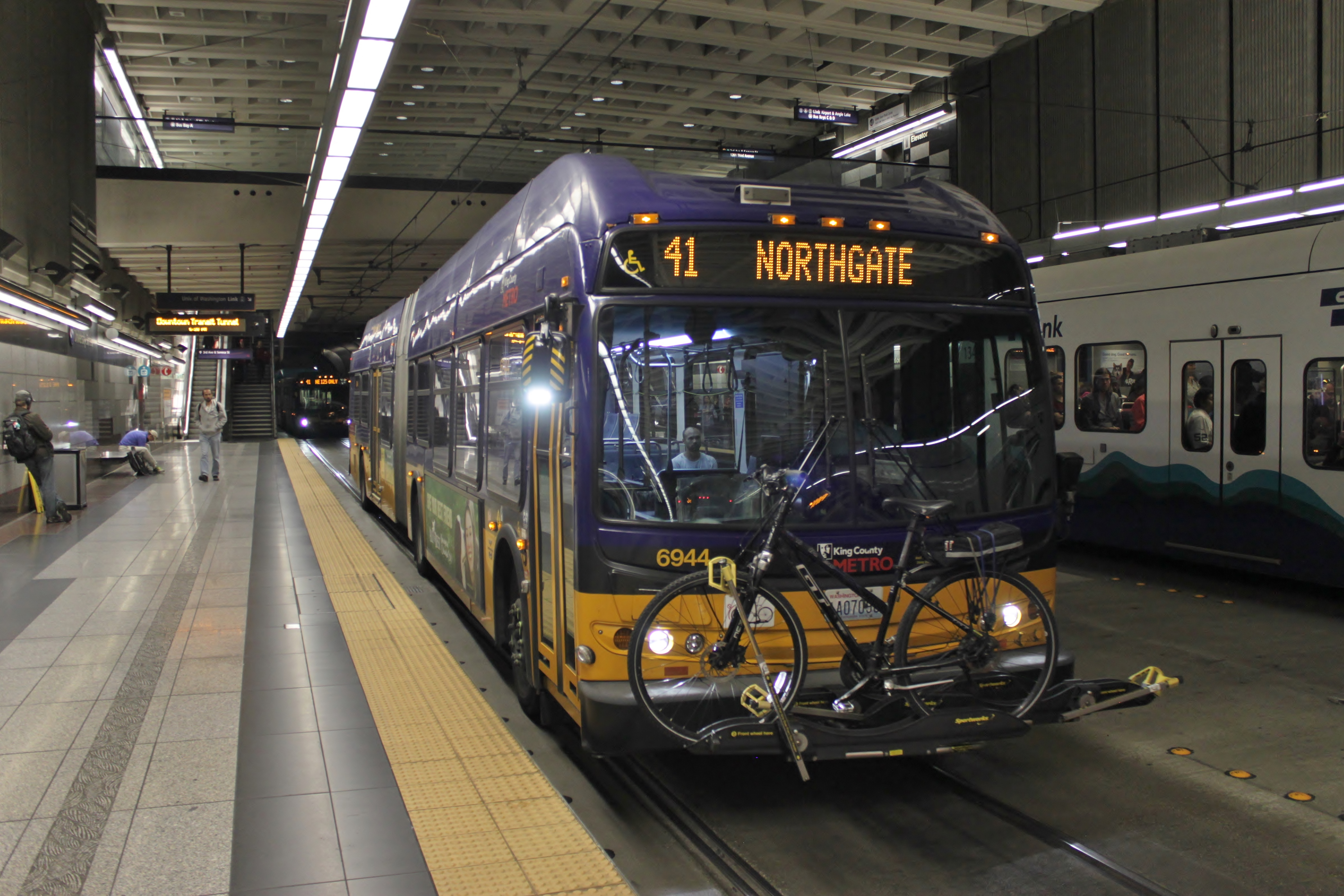
- A Northgate-bound bus at University Street in the Downtown Seattle Transit Tunnel

Overview
- System: King County Metro
- Status: Deleted
- Began service: September 8, 1970
- Ended service: October 2, 2021

Route
- Route type: Express
- Locale: Seattle, Washington, U.S.
- Start: Downtown Seattle
- Via: Northgate Transit Center
- End: Lake City

Service
- Frequency: 6–15 minutes
- Weekend frequency: 15–20 minutes
- Ridership: 10,000 (weekdays, spring 2015)
- Timetable: King County Metro

Route 41 was an express bus route operated by King County Metro in Seattle, Washington, United States. It connected Lake City and Northgate to Downtown Seattle, with non-stop service on Interstate 5 south of Northgate Transit Center.

The route was created in 1970 by the city-run Seattle Transit System as the 41 Blue Streak, the first in a series of express bus services in North Seattle using the Interstate 5 express lanes. It was transferred to Metro in 1973 and dropped the "Blue Streak" branding in 1978.

Route 41 was moved to the downtown transit tunnel in 1991, and expanded into an all-day route in 2002. It became one of the busiest routes operated by King County Metro, with over 10,000 daily riders. The service was moved out of the downtown tunnel in 2019 and was retired on October 2, 2021, with the opening of Link light rail service to Northgate.

== Route ==
Route 41 began in the Chinatown–International District neighborhood at the south end of Downtown Seattle, serving a pair of stops near International District/Chinatown station and King Street Station. The bus route traveled through Downtown Seattle on 3rd Avenue, the main transit corridor for the city, and turned east onto Olive Way near the Westlake Center. Inbound buses ran on Union Street, while outbound buses used Olive Way to reach Interstate 5, with northbound access to a direct ramp on Howell Street to the express lanes during certain times of the day. Route 41 traveled non-stop on Interstate 5 for 6 miles (9.7 km) to the Northgate Transit Center, a major bus station in North Seattle near the Northgate Mall; buses stopped at bays 2 and 5 for northbound and southbound trips, respectively. From the transit center, route 41 continued north on 5th Avenue Northeast past the Northgate Mall, and turned east onto Northeast 125th Street in Pinehurst. Buses make local stops through the mostly residential area, which gives way to the Lake City commercial center. Route 41 then turned north onto Lake City Way and terminated at Northeast 130th Street.

Route 41 ran at a frequency of 6 minutes during peak hours on weekdays, and 15 to 20 minutes at other times. Some trips were truncated to Northgate instead of serving Lake City. In spring 2015, Metro estimated that 10,000 daily riders used route 41 on weekdays.

=== Connections ===
Route 41 was the trunk service for North Seattle, connecting with local buses at Northgate Transit Center and in Lake City.

Station	Connections (as of 2019)	Notes
Downtown Seattle
4th/5th Avenue South & South Jackson Street	Sound Transit Link light rail: Central Link to University of Washington and Angle Lake (via International District/Chinatown station); King County Metro, Community Transit, Sound Transit Express, Amtrak, Sounder commuter rail, First Hill Streetcar	
3rd Avenue & James Street	Sound Transit Link light rail: Central Link to University of Washington and Angle Lake (via Pioneer Square station); King County Metro, Community Transit, Sound Transit Express	
3rd Avenue & Marion/Madison Street	King County Metro, Community Transit, Sound Transit Express	
3rd Avenue & Union Street (NB) Union Street & 4th Avenue (SB)	Sound Transit Link light rail: Central Link to University of Washington and Angle Lake (via University Street station); King County Metro, Community Transit, Sound Transit Express	
3rd Avenue & Pine Street	Sound Transit Link light rail: Central Link to University of Washington and Angle Lake (via Westlake station); King County Metro, Community Transit, Sound Transit Express, Seattle Center Monorail, South Lake Union Streetcar	
Olive Way & 6th Avenue (NB)	King County Metro, Community Transit, Sound Transit Express	
Non-stop via Interstate 5 to North Seattle
Northgate Transit Center Bays 2 & 5 (NE 103rd Street & 1st Avenue NE)	King County Metro: 26X, 40, 63, 67, 75, 303X, 345, 346, 347, 348, 995; Sound Transit Express: 555	Some trips terminate at Northgate TC
Local service on 5th Avenue NE
5th Avenue NE & NE 125th Street		Some trips terminate at NE 125th Street
Local service on NE 125th Street
Lake City Way NE & NE 130th Street	King County Metro: 64X, 65, 75, 309X, 312X, 330, 372X; Sound Transit Express: 522	

== History ==
=== Blue Streak ===
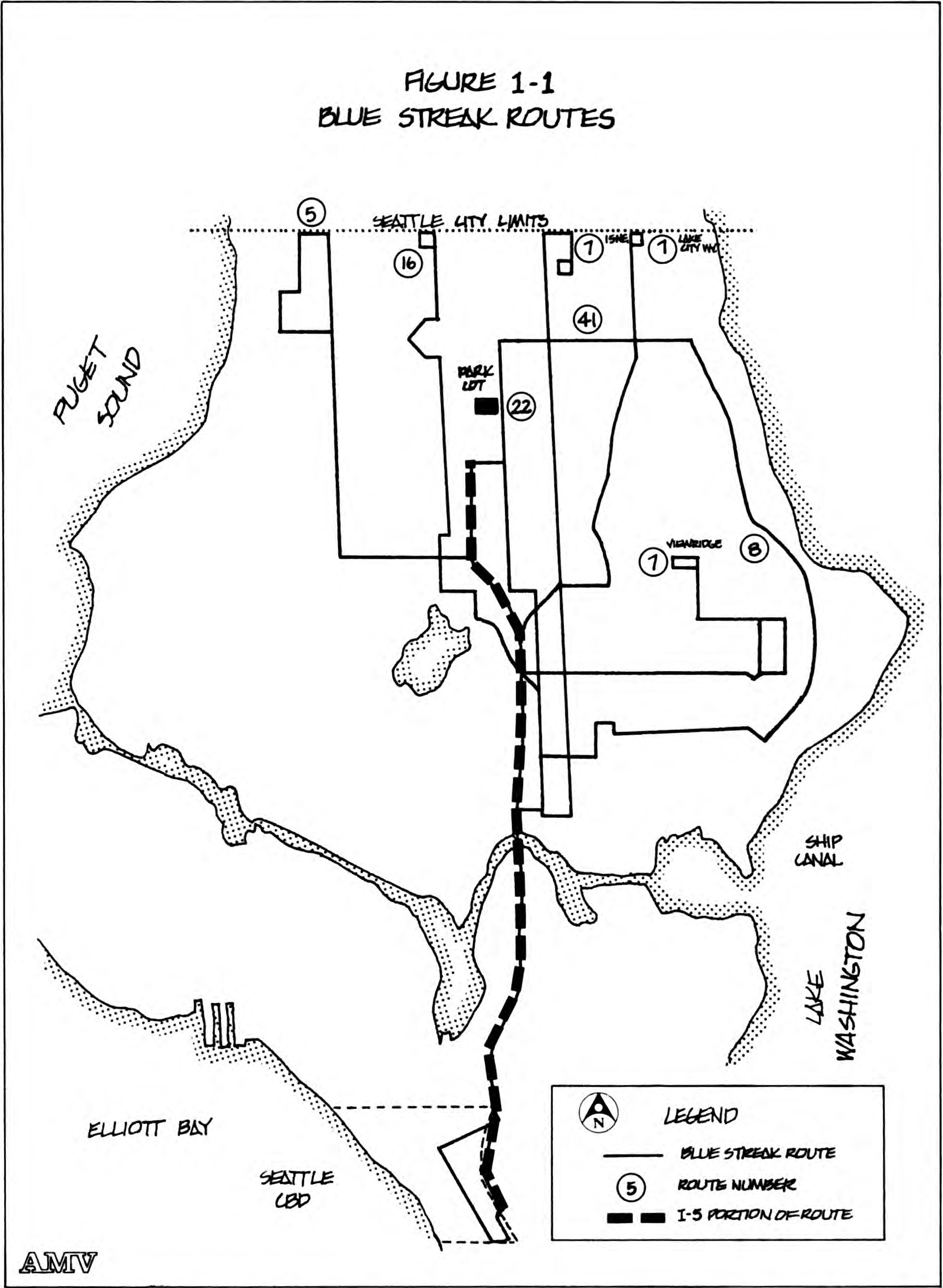
Route map of Blue Streak routes, including Route 41, from a 1973 report

The construction and completion of Interstate 5 through North Seattle spurred considerable suburban development in the 1950s. Northgate and Lake City were annexed into the city of Seattle in 1954, and the city-run Seattle Transit System expanded bus service into the area. The new service included a shuttle that ran at a significant loss for several years before being cancelled in the late 1950s. A second attempt at serving the north end with bus service was launched in 1963, with existing routes extended north towards Northgate and Lake City later that year.

Increasing congestion on Interstate 5 and declining bus ridership led city officials to propose a rapid transit service using the freeway's reversible express lanes. In 1966, the federal government approved planning of an express bus service, named "Blue Streak" by Seattle Transit, that would use the express lanes between Northeast 110th Street and Cherry Street in Downtown Seattle.

The Department of Housing and Urban Development (HUD) awarded $1.03 million (equivalent to $6.89 million in 2023 dollars) in January 1968 to Seattle Transit to develop the Blue Streak project, but the launch was delayed by a shortage in suitable buses. In May, HUD awarded a further $2.39 million (equivalent to $16 million in 2023 dollars) to purchase 70 diesel buses, which were delivered in November.

The continued financial problems with Seattle Transit put the Blue Streak program in jeopardy, leading to calls to suspend the program before it launched. Service was originally slated to begin in 1968, and delays led to the federal government establishing a deadline in early 1969 for a city decision on whether to move forward. A park and ride lot in Northgate was secured in August 1969, settling the demands of the federal government. The United States Department of Transportation approved $2 million (equivalent to $13.4 million in 2023 dollars) in operating funds for Blue Streak in January 1970, providing two-thirds of the system's operating budget for the first two years of service.

Blue Streak service on Route 41 began on September 8, 1970, traveling on local streets between Sand Point, Lake City and Northgate Mall, and proceeding onto Interstate 5 non-stop to Downtown Seattle. Blue Streak buses were given exclusive use of the Columbia and Cherry ramps on the Interstate 5 reversible express lanes, as well as a bus-only lane on 5th Avenue. Buses traveled primarily on 3rd Avenue through Downtown, heading northbound during morning inbound trips and southbound during afternoon outbound trips towards Northgate. Buses ran at a frequency of 7 to 15 minutes from 7 a.m. to 7 p.m. on weekdays and Saturdays. The trip between Northgate and downtown took an average of 15 minutes, and took near-full busloads on the first day. The 22 buses on Blue Streak service were initially colored red, but were later repainted blue to match the branding.

US Secretary of Transportation John A. Volpe praised the Blue Streak system during a speech on opening day, calling the express buses "an example [of] imaginative, innovative use of existing transportation facilities and equipment". The Blue Streak experiment attracted interest from mass transit advocates and officials from across the nation. The Blue Streak system was expanded to other routes in the 1970s and served as the model for modern park-and-ride express service in the Seattle metropolitan area and across the United States. In its first year of service, Blue Streak routes increased ridership in North Seattle amid an overall decline in Seattle Transit ridership.

Seattle Transit general manager Lloyd Garber said that demand for parking was higher than expected and that it was too early to analyze ridership; after the first week of service, Seattle Transit began surveying riders to determine whether motorists had been lured by the new service. The study determined that 75 percent of surveyed patrons had switched from their personal automobiles, and that Blue Streak was responsible for a decrease of 400 vehicles on Interstate 5 at rush hour. By late October, demand at the Northgate park and ride prompted the State Highway Department to offer funding for an auxiliary lot.

Seattle Transit cancelled Saturday service on the Blue Streak routes in March 1971, citing low patronage and the near-empty parking lot at Northgate.

=== Metro Transit ===
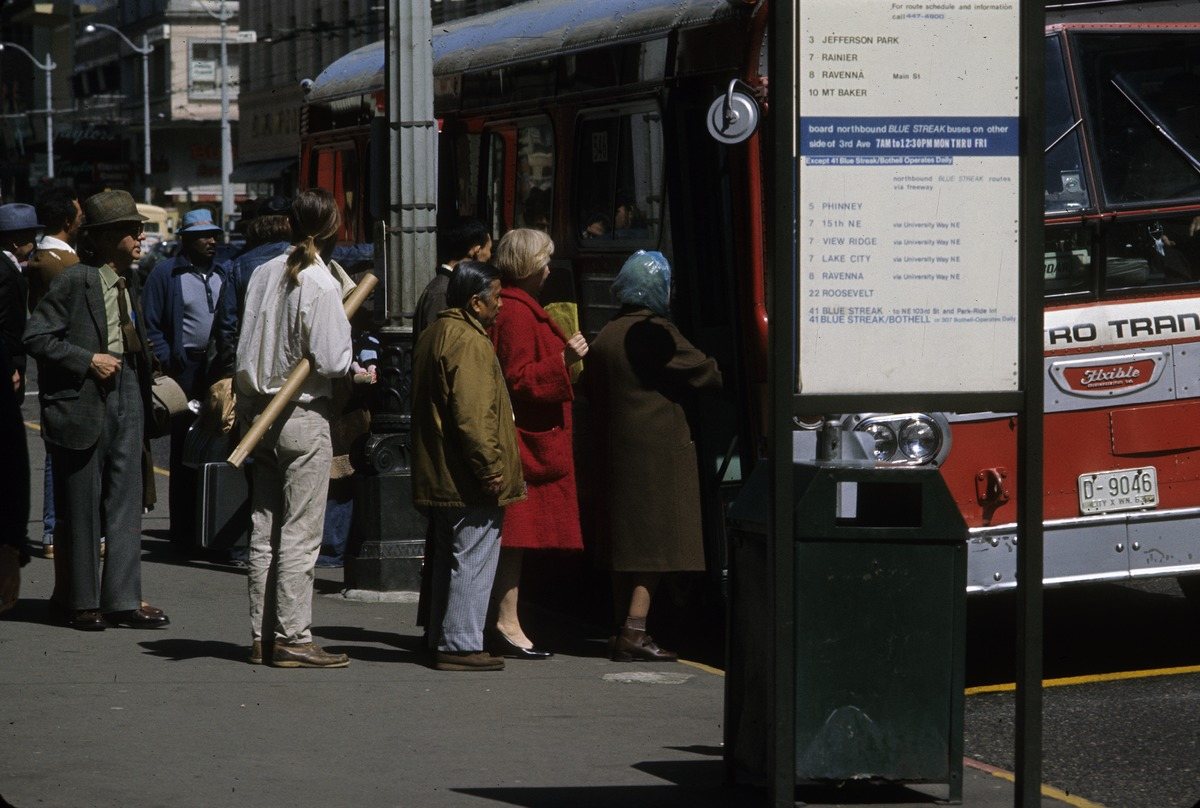
Bus stop serving Blue Streak routes on Third Avenue in Downtown Seattle, mid-1970s

After a countywide public transit system was approved by voters on September 19, 1972, bus service within Seattle was transferred from the Seattle Transit System to the Municipality of Metropolitan Seattle (Metro) on January 1, 1973. As part of the changeover, the leased Blue Streak parking lot was acquired by Metro using funds from the Urban Mass Transit Administration. As part of a system renumbering in January 1978, Metro eliminated the "Blue Streak" branding on routes, creating the modern route 41.

Route 41 was chosen as one of the initial routes to be routed through the downtown transit tunnel in Downtown Seattle, but due to a delay in the production of special dual-mode buses for the tunnel, route 41 was not moved into the tunnel until 1991. Route 41 ran primarily during peak hours, with some limited midday service, and was supplemented by route 307, which ran from Downtown Seattle to Northgate and Bothell on weekends and nights. The northern terminus of route 41 was moved from Magnuson Park to 5th Avenue NE and NE 125th Street in 1997, eliminating service to Sand Point and Lake City.

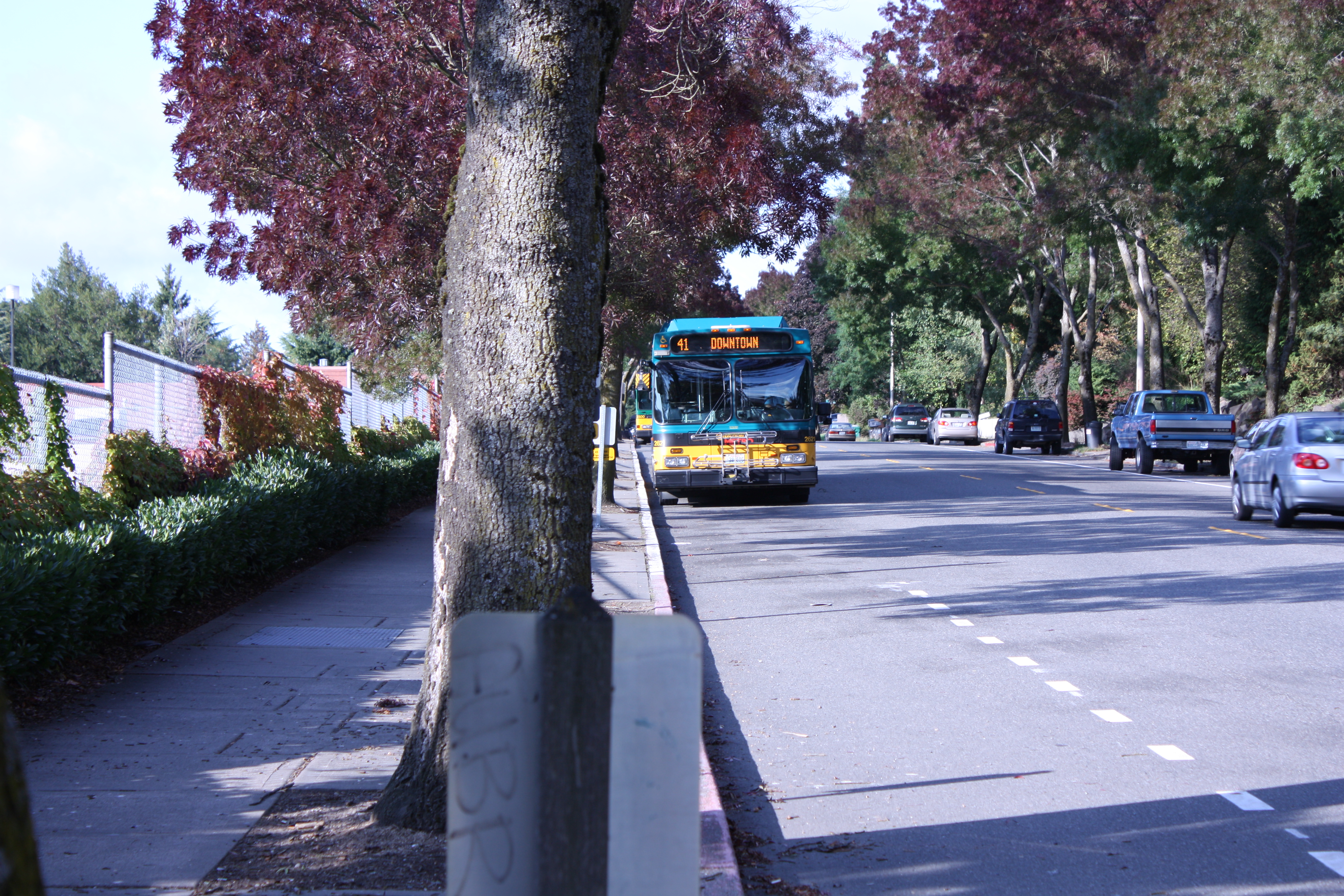
Route 41's northern terminal in Lake City in 2009

A major restructure of Northeast Seattle service occurred in 2002 to accommodate the new Sound Transit Express route 522 from Seattle to Woodinville via the State Route 522 corridor. As part of the restructure, route 307 was eliminated and replaced by route 522 as well as increased service on route 41, which was extended to Lake City and given service 7 days a week with frequencies as high as 15 minutes at midday on weekdays.

Beginning in September 2005, the downtown transit tunnel was closed for renovations to accommodate light rail service. Route 41, the tunnel's most popular bus route, was routed onto surface streets within Downtown Seattle, primarily using 3rd Avenue between Jackson and Virginia streets until the tunnel reopened in September 2007. Buses were permanently removed from the downtown transit tunnel on March 23, 2019, as construction at Convention Place station had severed access to the north portal. Route 41 was relocated onto 3rd Avenue, serving stops near the transit tunnel stations, as well as Olive Way and Stewart Street. In July 2019, inbound southbound buses were moved from Stewart Street to Union Street to reduce morning travel times by 10 minutes.

Route 41 was permanently retired on October 2, 2021, following the extension of Link light rail service to Northgate Transit Center. The express portion was replaced by the Link 1 Line, while the local portion was replaced by a realignment of Route 75.
