= Mary Peters =

Mary Peters may refer to:

- Mary Peters (athlete) (born 1939), Northern Irish athlete
- Mary Peters (hymn writer) (1813–1856), British hymn writer
- Mary Peters (1852–1921), indigenous Oregon woman and ferry operator
- Mary E. Peters (born 1948), American politician, 15th United States Secretary of Transportation
- Mary Peters Fieser (1909–1997), née Mary Peters, American chemist
- Mary Ann Peters (born 1951), American ambassador to Bangladesh
- Mary Ann Peters (artist) (born 1949), American artist

== See also ==
- Mary (disambiguation)
- Peters (disambiguation)
