= Northgate station (Sound Transit) =

Light rail and bus station in Seattle, Washington, U.S.

45 Northgate
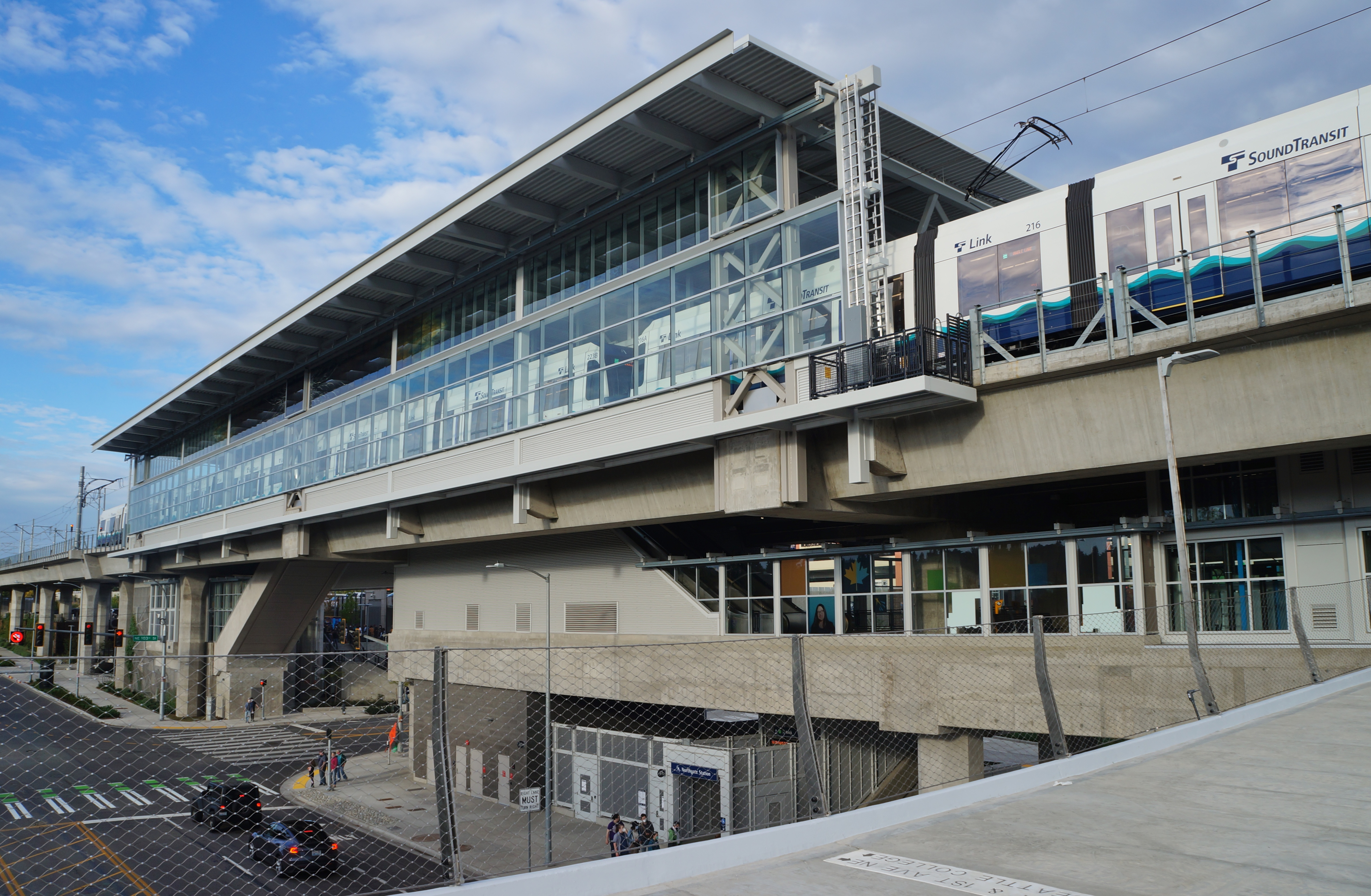
- View of the light rail station from the pedestrian bridge

General information
- Location: 10200 1st Avenue Northeast; Seattle, Washington; United States
- Coordinates: 47°42′11″N 122°19′41″W
- System: Link light rail
- Platforms: 1 island platform
- Tracks: 2
- Train operators: Sound Transit
- Bus routes: 6
- Bus stands: 4
- Bus operators: King County Metro

Construction
- Structure type: Elevated
- Parking: 1,475 spaces
- Cycle facilities: Lockers and racks
- Accessible: Yes

History
- Opened: June 6, 1992 (buses); October 2, 2021 (light rail)

Passengers
- 4,213 daily weekday boardings (2025); 1,399,476 total boardings (2025)

Services
Preceding station	Sound Transit	Following station
Link
Pinehurst toward Lynnwood City Center	1 Line	Roosevelt toward Federal Way Downtown
Pinehurst toward Lynnwood City Center	2 Line	Roosevelt toward Downtown Redmond
Location

Northgate station is a light rail and bus station in the Northgate neighborhood of Seattle, Washington, United States. It is served by the 1 Line and 2 Line on Sound Transit's Link light rail system. The station also has four bus bays served by King County Metro routes and parking for 1,475 vehicles in several garages and lots. The complex is adjacent to the Northgate Mall (now named Northgate Station).

The transit center opened in June 1992 as a major hub for North Seattle buses and was prioritized as a light rail terminus during planning later in the decade. Construction on the light rail extension to Northgate began in 2012 and station construction began in 2017. The extension of the 1 Line, including Northgate station and a pedestrian bridge over Interstate 5, opened on October 2, 2021. Northgate remained the northern terminus of 1 Line until the Lynnwood Link extension opened in August 2024. It was once proposed as a bus rapid transit terminal and is an area with potential for additional transit-oriented development.

== Location ==
Northgate station is located along the east side of 1st Avenue Northeast on the southwest side of the Northgate Station shopping mall in northern Seattle. It is directly east of Interstate 5 and the terminus of its reversible express lanes, which intersect 1st Avenue Northeast at Northeast 103rd Street. To the west of the freeway is the North Seattle College campus, connected via the John Lewis Memorial Bridge to the station's mezzanine level. The station and its parking lots are adjacent to medical clinics, offices, and the Thornton Place retail and housing complex. In 2013, the Puget Sound Regional Council estimated that the area within 1/2 mile (0.80 km) of the station had a population of 5,453 residents and was home to 9,273 jobs.

== History ==
=== Bus station ===
The Northgate Transit Center opened on June 6, 1992, at a cost of $15.8 million to construct. It was planned in 1978, as part of King County Metro's "MetroTRANSITion" program, becoming the last of eleven transit centers built under the plan. The Northgate area was historically served by the Blue Streak express bus to downtown Seattle from 1970 onward; by the end of the decade, Metro Transit had made Northgate into a regional hub for buses using a park and ride on the north side of the mall (closed in 2008 and converted into Hubbard Homestead Park). Construction began in 1990 with the demolition of a Group Health clinic and relocation of a segment of Thornton Creek.

Northgate Transit Center designed by ZGF

The transit center was sited adjacent to the mall and an access ramp to the Interstate 5 reversible express lanes. It consisted of six bus bays that served a reverse-direction street for buses with extra space for layovers and passing lanes. The passenger waiting area was covered by large white canvases held aloft by steel towers, designed by ZGF Architects. It featured several passenger amenities, including public restrooms, pay phones, an ORCA card vending machine, bicycle parking, and a baby changing station. Several sculptures at the transit center were designed by Cris Bruch and cost $50,000 to install as part of the agency's public art program.

The park and ride at the transit center initially consisted of 284 spaces in the west lot before it underwent two expansions. In 2001, the parking lot was expanded to 950 spaces after the $7.6 million purchase of 3.9 acres (1.6 ha) from Simon Property Group. The completion of the Thornton Creek development in April 2009 brought 350 additional parking spaces to be added to the transit center, mostly used to replace a 500-stall park and ride north of the mall. By 2016, Northgate Transit Center had over 1,000 total parking spaces that normally filled before 9 a.m. on weekdays.

=== Light rail planning and construction ===
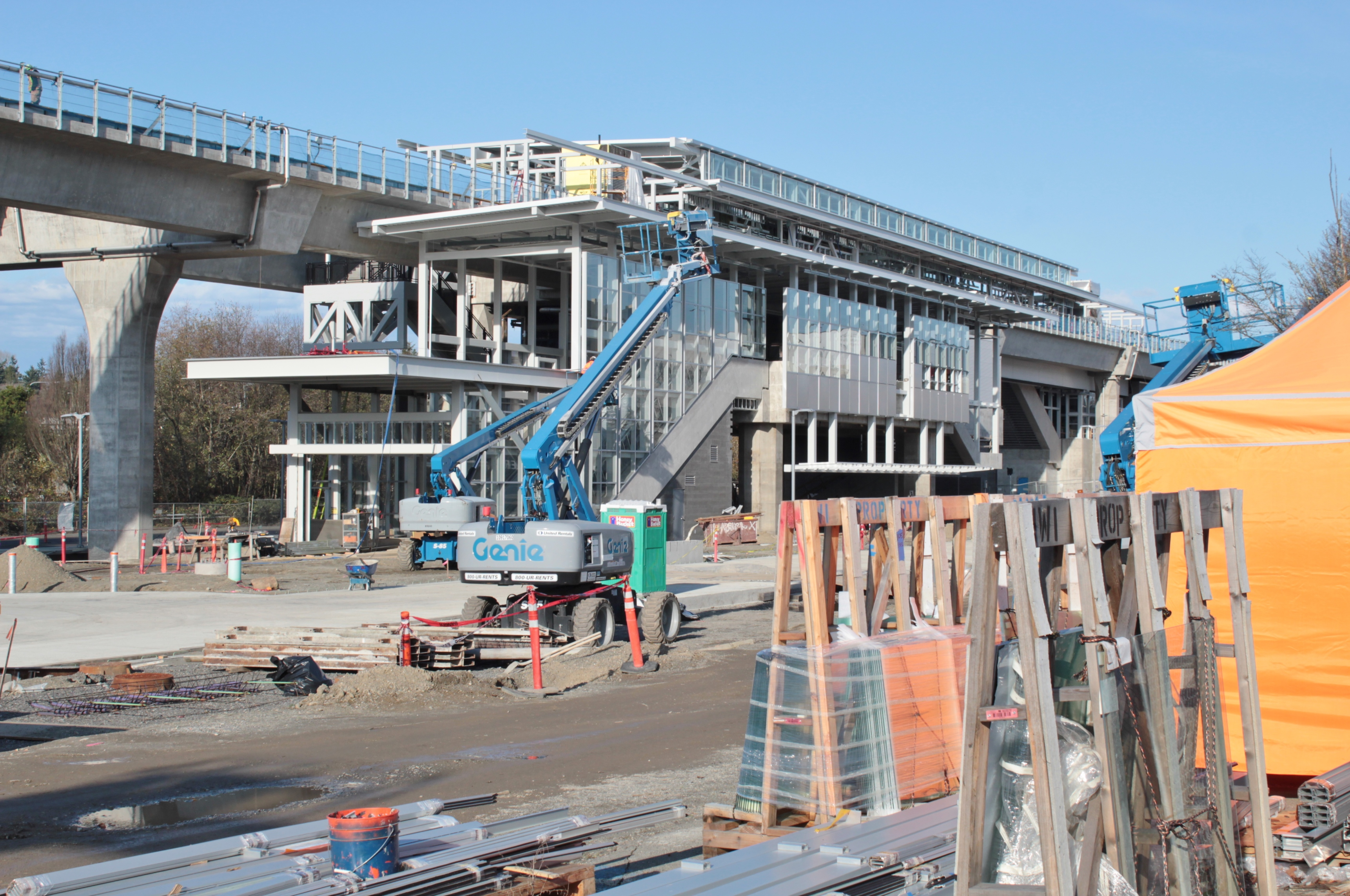
Light rail construction as seen in November 2019

The Northgate area had been considered in several rapid transit studies in the late 20th century as a suitable terminus or major station. The Northgate Link project was proposed as part of the "Sound Move" ballot measure in 1996, pending additional funding, but was deferred until the voter approval of the Sound Transit 2 package in 2008.

Construction of the Northgate extension began in 2012. Absher Construction was awarded a $174 million contract in August 2016 to build Northgate station and the elevated guideway leading to the tunnel portal. On January 13, 2017, Sound Transit broke ground on the station, beginning construction with the demolition of two parking lots. By July, installation of the station's support columns and platform-level girders were underway. Construction on the station was declared substantially complete in February 2021, shortly after powered testing of light rail vehicles had begun.

As part of the project, parking capacity at the transit center was reduced by spaces eliminated for the station and a new bus station to the west of the original one. A partially below-grade parking garage with 450 spaces was opened in November 2018 on the southwest corner of the Northgate Mall parking lot. A larger garage with up to 900 vehicles was proposed but rejected after outcry from community and neighborhood groups.

Northgate station and its adjoining pedestrian bridge to North Seattle College were opened on October 2, 2021, a day after the formal ribbon-cutting. Bus service was transferred to the new bus bays under the light rail station on the same day, including new routes serving Snohomish County on Sound Transit Express and Community Transit that debuted on October 4. The public restrooms at the station's mezzanine level were closed in mid-2022 due to vandalism and security incidents; they were replaced by portable toilets for a year while undergoing renovations.

Beyond the station, a 400-foot (120 m) pocket track was built to the north for train storage and reversal, as well as accommodating the Lynnwood Link Extension. The extension beyond Northgate to Lynnwood City Center station opened on August 30, 2024. The 2 Line entered simulated service on February 14, 2026, with passengers able to board trains from Lynnwood to International District/Chinatown station. Sound Transit estimates that Northgate station will have 15,000 daily boardings by 2030.

== Station layout ==
The station's former pictogram, which depicted a dragonfly

Northgate station is located on the east side of 1st Avenue Northeast between 103rd and 100th streets on the southwest side of Northgate Mall. It consists of a single island platform elevated 25 to 45 feet (7.6 to 13.7 m) above ground level with an intermediate mezzanine. The mezzanine has ticket vending machines and public restrooms and is connected to both the platform and entrances via stairs, escalators, and elevators. It has four entrances: Exit A, at the north end adjacent to the parking garage; Exit B, with two entrances leading to the bus bays at street level; and Exit C, which connects the mezzanine directly with the John Lewis Memorial Bridge, which crosses Interstate 5. At street level, Northgate station has a bicycle parking station, on-demand lockers, and free racks. The plaza below the station is named for state senator Scott White.

The station's four bus bays lie under the mezzanine and platform and run along 1st Avenue Northeast and a parallel access road to the east. The former bus platforms to the east of the station are now used for layovers. A designated pickup and drop-off area is located near the south entrance on the east side of the access road. Northgate station has a total of 1,475 parking stalls that are divided between five facilities: a four-level garage with 443 stalls, a western surface lot with 139 stalls, an eastern surface lot with 263 stalls, a mall-owned garage with 280 stalls available on weekday mornings, and 350 stalls in the Thornton Place garage available on weekday mornings. The garages and lots include reserved parking for carpooling high-occupancy vehicles and other users with the use of a pre-registered permit. The upper level of the Sound Transit parking garage at the station and several nearby lots provide paid parking for the light rail station.

Northgate station was designed by Hewitt Architects, a Seattle-based firm that also worked on Roosevelt station. The station features several pieces of public art that was funded by the "STart" program, which allocates a percent of construction costs for art. Seattle-based artist Mary Ann Peters created Darner's Prism, a set of painted glass murals inspired by the green darner dragonfly, the official state insect of Washington, laid over representations of the nearby freeway noise and Thornton Creek. The larger mural spans 100 feet (30 m) above the platform's west clerestory and a smaller companion is located in the north stairwell; both were produced by German glassmakers Franz Mayer of Munich. Cris Bruch created two new sculptures for the station's plaza and north entrance to complement his earlier work at the original transit center. The plaza work is a 23-foot (7.0 m) steel sculpture with nine "trunks" with clusters of aluminum "blossoms" that hang from their curved branches, while the north entrance has several polyhedrons mounted to the screen wall on the station's façade.

The station was represented in maps and signage by a pictogram that depicted a dragonfly. The pictogram series was retired in 2024 and replaced by station numbers.

=== Pedestrian bridge ===
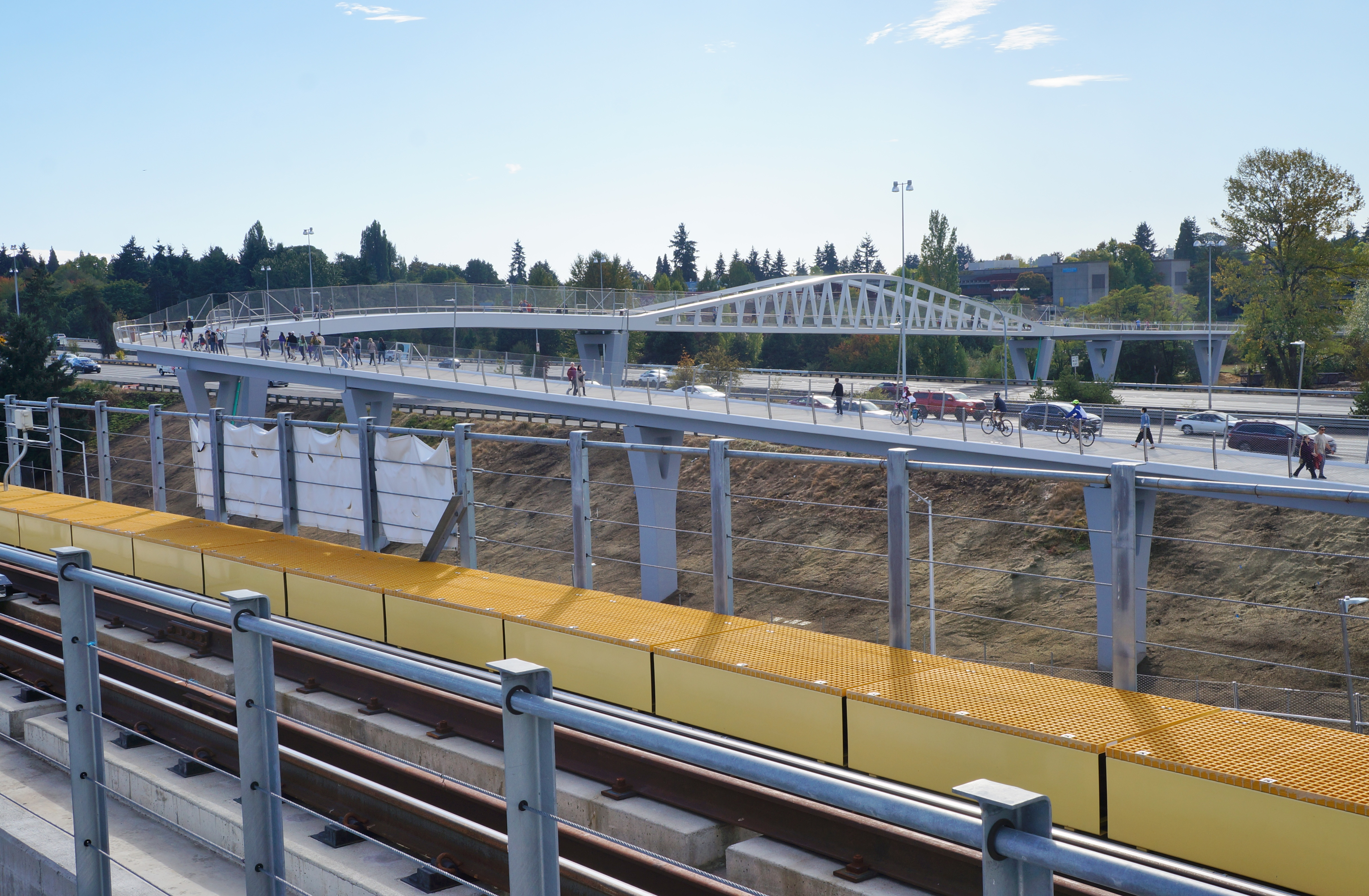
The John Lewis Memorial Bridge, as seen from Northgate station's platform

The John Lewis Memorial Bridge is an overpass for pedestrians and bicycles crossing Interstate 5, connecting the mezzanine of Northgate station to the North Seattle College campus and Licton Springs neighborhood. It opened alongside the light rail station on October 2, 2021, and was dedicated by city leaders. The bridge is 1,900 feet (580 m) long, with a 1,338-foot (408 m) main span over the freeway using a Vierendeel truss and a ramp connecting to a protected cycletrack at street level on 1st Avenue Northeast. It was officially named in honor of former U.S. Congressman John Lewis of Georgia by the Seattle City Council in August 2021 to recognize his civil rights activism amid criticism for not choosing a local namesake.

The bridge and its connection to the station were first proposed in 2007 by the city government and studied by King County in 2011. It was tentatively approved by Sound Transit in 2012 as a replacement for a larger parking garage, with the agency and the Seattle Department of Transportation (SDOT) agreeing to each fund $5 million towards its construction, estimated to cost $20 million at the time. Several designs were considered, including a cable-stayed bridge, a tied-arch bridge, and an enclosed tube with hexagonal sections proposed by LMN Architects that was chosen by the city government in 2015. The tube design would require additional structural supports, including a steel deck under the walkway, raising the project's costs to over $60 million. The city applied for a $15 million grant from the federal government in 2015 that was rejected, but the project instead received funds from the state government and a local transportation levy passed in 2015.

The bridge project was put on hold in 2016 due to the rise in projected costs and a new design team was assembled by SDOT, to be led by VIA Architects. The simpler design, estimated to cost $37.5 million in 2017, replaced the enclosed design with an uncovered tied-arch bridge that would be 16 feet (4.9 m) wide. The main Vierendeel truss span was originally planned to use a proprietary lighting system for the handrails until the initial bids were $8 million over the estimated budget, leading to a redesign. Construction on the bridge began in February 2020, with project costs estimated at $56 million. The prefabricated trusses were manufactured in Tacoma and trucked to the bridge site for assembly and installation, which was delayed to May 2021 due to the COVID-19 pandemic.

== Transit-oriented development ==
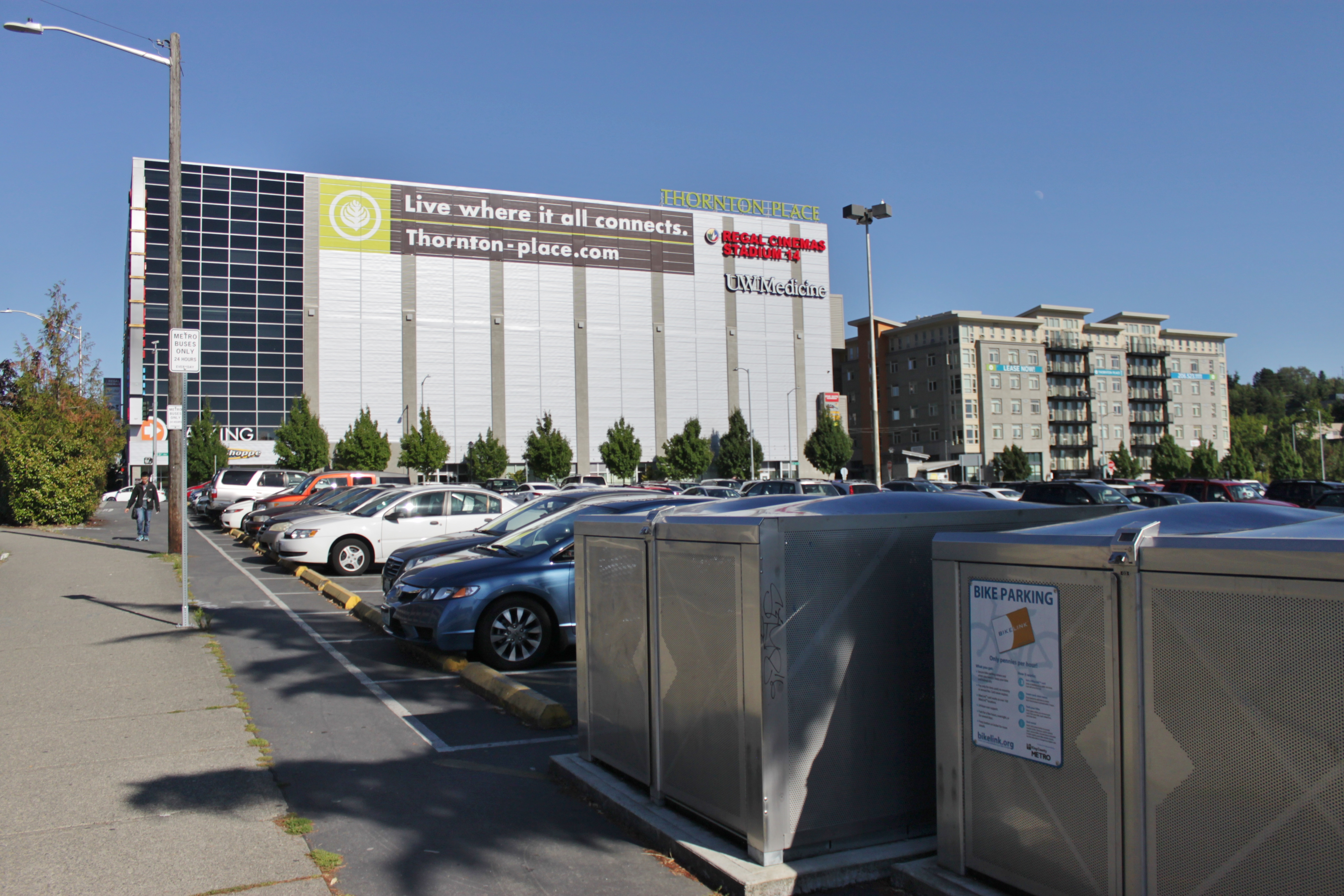
Thornton Place, a transit-oriented development opened at Northgate Transit Center in 2009.

In anticipation of light rail construction, the area around Northgate Mall was identified by the city as an "urban village" in 1993, with heavy potential for transit-oriented development. In 2007, the city rezoned the Northgate area to support an increased height limit of 125 feet (38 m).

In 2009, one of the mall's surface parking lots was converted into a mixed-use, transit-oriented development called "Thornton Place", with 109 condominiums, 278 apartments (including affordable units), a movie theater, and 50,000 square feet (4,600 m^{2}) of retail space. The complex, which also includes a community park and a daylit section of Thornton Creek, was heralded as one of Seattle's first true transit-oriented developments.

The city of Seattle published an "urban design framework" for the Northgate area in 2013, outlining a vision for the redevelopment of the neighborhood into an urban center, based on the 1993 urban village designation. The report focused on maximizing transit-oriented development around the transit center and light rail station by building mixed-use infill development in the surface parking lots south of the mall with open spaces and plazas. The draft "Seattle 2035" comprehensive plan, written in 2015, anticipates at least 1,600 residential units and 6,000 jobs to be added to the Northgate area by 2035. Simon Property Group announced a major redevelopment plan for Northgate Mall in 2018, proposing the addition of office space and 1,200 apartment units on the 55-acre (22 ha) site. The redevelopment also includes a hockey center that serves as the training facility for the Seattle Kraken, which opened in September 2021. The first hotel in the development opened in 2025 and is scheduled to be followed by the first residential building in 2026.

In 2019, the Seattle Housing Authority acquired Northgate Commons, a 1950s apartment complex on the north side of the mall, with the intent of redeveloping it into a mixed-income public housing complex. The agency announced plans in 2021 to build six new buildings on the site with 1,400 total apartment units that would include affordable housing. King County Metro announced a 75-year lease agreement with Bridge Housing and Community Roots Housing in 2022 to develop a seven-story apartment building with 235 affordable units and a childcare center. The building, which uses the north half of the surface park-and-ride lot adjacent to the former bus bays, began construction in late 2023 and was completed in December 2025.

== Services ==
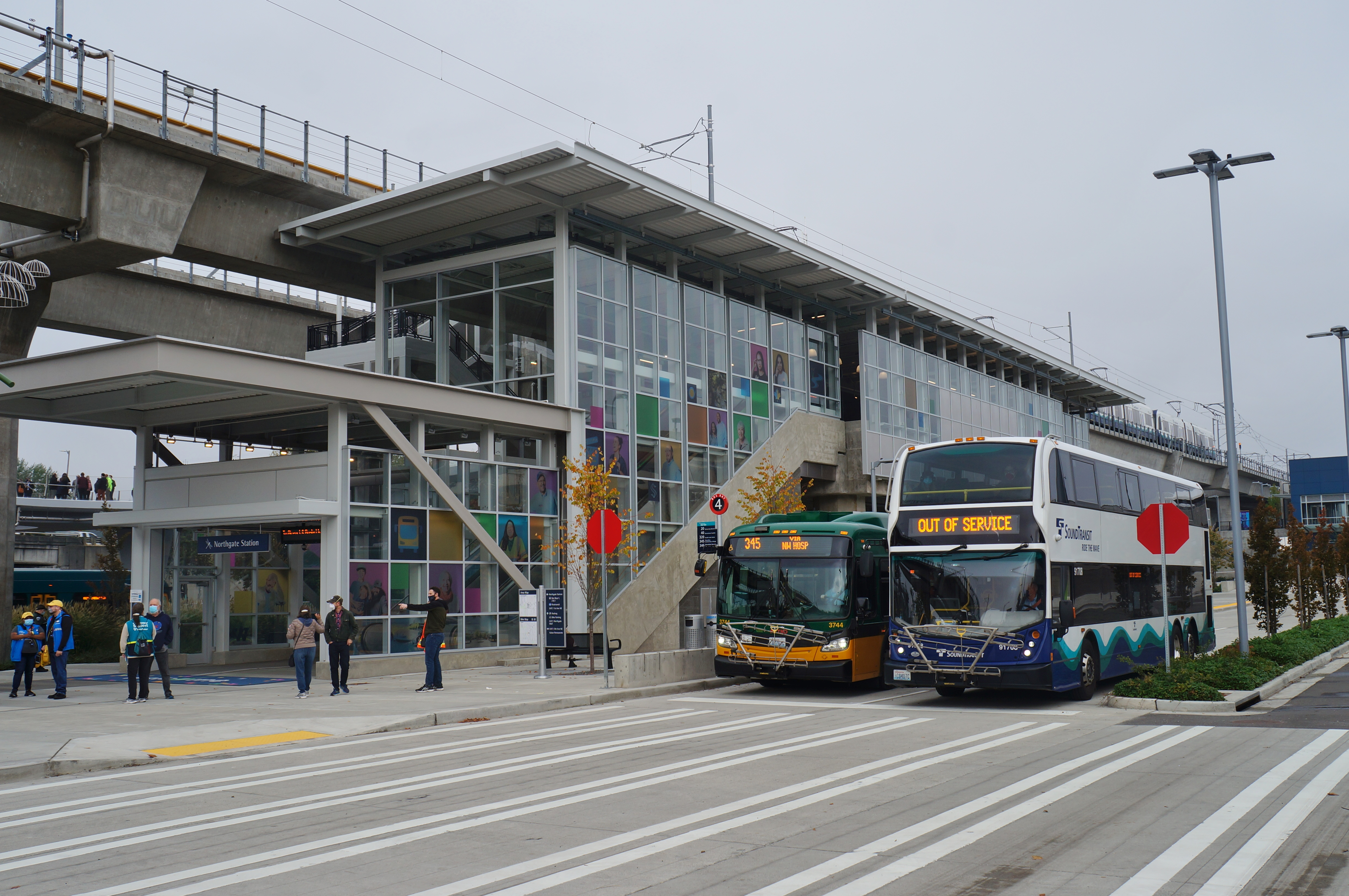
Buses at Northgate station in 2021

The station is served by the 1 Line and 2 Line, both part of the Link light rail system. Northgate is situated between Pinehurst and Roosevelt stations. It is the fifth southbound station from Lynnwood City Center, the northern terminus of both lines. Link light rail trains serve Northgate station 20 hours a day on weekdays and Saturdays, from 5:00 a.m. to 12:00 a.m.; and 18 hours on Sundays, from 6:00 a.m. to 12:00 a.m. During regular weekday service, trains on each line operate roughly every eight minutes during rush hour, ten minutes during midday operation, and twelve to fifteen minutes in the early morning and at night. On weekends, trains on each line arrive at Northgate station every ten minutes during midday hours and every twelve to fifteen minutes during mornings and evenings. The two lines combine for frequencies of four minutes during rush hour and five minutes during midday and weekend service. The station is approximately 16 minutes from Westlake station in Downtown Seattle, 43 minutes from Bellevue Downtown station, and 54 minutes from SeaTac/Airport station. In 2025, an average of 4,213 passengers boarded Link trains at Northgate station on weekdays.

=== Bus routes ===
The station is also a major hub for buses in North Seattle with routes operated primarily by King County Metro. Northgate station has four bays for buses around the perimeter of the light rail station, with access from Exit B. King County Metro operates six bus routes that provide all-day connections to Ballard, Green Lake, Roosevelt, the University District, Lake City, and Shoreline. A peak-only commuter route from Shoreline and Northgate station provides further connections to First Hill and South Lake Union.

From 2021 to 2024, Northgate station was also the terminus of several express routes from Snohomish County that had previously served Downtown Seattle and the University of Washington campus. Four Sound Transit Express routes from Snohomish County provided all-day connections to Everett, Lynnwood, and Mountlake Terrace. Community Transit truncated its entire University District commuter network to Northgate station when it opened, providing peak-only service to Lynnwood, Edmonds, Mukilteo, Everett, and Marysville. These routes were eliminated or truncated in September 2024 following the opening of light rail stations in Lynnwood and Mountlake Terrace. Sound Transit previously operated express buses to Northgate from Everett on routes 505 and 506 from 2002 to 2003.

Route	Bay(s)	Termini	Via	Notes
40	4	Northgate station, Downtown Seattle	Ballard, Fremont, South Lake Union	
61	1, 4	Greenwood, Lake City	Licton Springs	
67	1	Northgate station, Seattle Children's Hospital	Roosevelt, University District	
75	1	Northgate station, University District	Lake City, Sand Point, University of Washington	
303X	3	Aurora Village Transit Center, Cherry Hill	Shoreline, South Lake Union, First Hill	Peak-only commuter route
345	4	Northgate station, Shoreline South/148th station	North Seattle College, Bitter Lake, Shoreline, Haller Lake	
348	1, 4	Northgate station, Richmond Beach	Jackson Park, Shoreline North/185th station, North City	
365	4	Northgate station, Shoreline North/185th station	Haller Lake, Shoreline	
512	2	Everett	Lynnwood City Center station	Sunday evenings only

=== Bus rapid transit ===
Northgate Transit Center had been planned as the terminus of a bus rapid transit line under development by the Seattle Department of Transportation as part of the RapidRide+ program. The program was funded by the November 2015 "Move Seattle" levy and consisted of seven corridors throughout the city, including upgrades to Route 40 from Northgate to Ballard, Fremont, and Downtown Seattle. The Northgate–Fremont project was downgraded in 2018, replacing its bus rapid transit elements with smaller-scale improvements to transit speed and reliability set to be completed in 2026.

A second corridor, later named the RapidRide J Line, was originally scheduled to open in 2021 and planned to connect Northgate and Roosevelt to the University District, Eastlake and South Lake Union neighborhoods. The project was scaled back to terminate near U District station due to budget shortfalls resulting from the COVID-19 pandemic, which caused a reduction in ridership and tax revenue, and completion was delayed to 2027.
