= Community Transit =

Bus transit agency serving Snohomish County, Washington

- A Community Transit bus at Lynnwood City Center station
- Commenced operation: October 4, 1976
- Headquarters: 2312 W. Casino Road; Everett, Washington
- Locale: Puget Sound region
- Service area: Snohomish County, Washington
- Service type: Bus service
- Alliance: Sound Transit
- Routes: 34
- Stops: 1,700
- Depots: 2
- Fleet: 256 buses, 79 paratransit vehicles, 344 vanpool vans
- Daily ridership: 34,100 (weekdays, Q2 2026)
- Annual ridership: 9,517,700 (2025)
- Fuel type: Diesel, hybrid electric, electric battery
- Operator: Transdev (paratransit only)
- Chief executive: Ric Ilgenfritz
- Website: www.communitytransit.org

Community Transit (CT) is the public transit authority of Snohomish County, Washington, United States, in the Seattle metropolitan area. It operates local bus, paratransit and vanpool service within Snohomish County, excluding the city of Everett (which is served by the separate Everett Transit system). CT is publicly funded, financed through sales taxes, federal grants, and farebox revenue, with an annual operating budget of $248.6 million as of 2025. In 2025, the system had a ridership of 9,517,700, or about 34,100 per weekday as of the second quarter of 2026, placing it third among transit agencies in the Puget Sound region.

The system, officially the Snohomish County Public Transportation Benefit Area Corporation (SCPTBA), operates a fleet of 256 accessible transit buses, 79 paratransit vehicles, and 345 vanpool vans that are maintained at two bus bases in Everett. Service is provided year-round at 1,700 stops on 34 routes throughout the county public transportation benefit area (PTBA). These include three Swift Bus Rapid Transit lines, local and commuter routes that connect with Link light rail, and service to regional Sound Transit facilities. CT also operates six Sound Transit Express routes that serve Snohomish County, Downtown Seattle, and the Interstate 405 corridor. The agency's microtransit service, Zip Shuttle, operates in four cities.

CT began operation as SCPTBA Public Transit on October 4, 1976, four months after voters approved a ballot initiative to establish and fund a new transit system—the third such attempt to create a PTBA. Renamed Community Transit in 1979, the agency expanded service in its first decades of existence, later taking over King County Metro commuter routes to Seattle and adding several cities into its PTBA in the 1980s and 1990s. The agency operated commuter service directly to destinations in Seattle until it truncated most of its routes in September 2024, shortly after Link light rail was extended to Lynnwood City Center station. CT was the first operator of bus rapid transit in Washington state and introduced double-decker buses, branded the "Double Tall", on its commuter routes to Seattle in the early 2010s.

== History ==
=== Formation and early years ===
A GM New Look bus used by Community Transit during its first years of service, later restored for museum use

Snohomish County established its public transportation benefit area (PTBA), the first in the state, after municipal corporations for public transportation were added to the Revised Code of Washington by the Washington State Legislature in 1975. The PTBA plan for a countywide bus system was approved during a general election on June 1, 1976, funded by a three-tenths increase of the sales tax rate in member cities.

Snohomish County had previously been served by an interurban railway from Everett to Seattle and coach lines operated by private companies under the Puget Sound Power Company, which were later absorbed by Greyhound. Two previous attempts to establish a bus system, under the Snohomish County Transportation Authority (SNOTRAN) in 1974, were rejected by voters from the entirety of Snohomish County. Heavy opposition came from the residents of Everett because of the high sales tax rate and planned absorption of Everett Transit, acquired by the city in 1969, forcing the SCPTBA to exclude Everett in its successful attempt at creating a bus system. SCPTBA Public Transit began operating in the cities of Brier, Edmonds, Lynnwood, Marysville, Mountlake Terrace, Snohomish and Woodway on October 4, 1976, using 18 leased GMC buses on seven routes carrying 6,414 passengers without fares during the first week.

SCPTBA Public Transit, whose service was known colloquially as the "Blue Bus" for its blue livery, carried 951,200 passengers in its first year of service on 15 local routes and 16 commuter express routes to Downtown Seattle and Northgate, contracted through King County Metro as a continuation of service provided by the Metropolitan Transit Corporation to southern Snohomish County before its merger with Seattle Transit System in 1973. The buses ran for 16 hours a day, charging a base fare of 20 cents (equivalent to $1.00 in 2025). Early on, the busiest local line was Route R14, accounting for 21 percent of system ridership in the first three months, running from the Edmonds waterfront to Lynnwood and the Boeing Everett Factory. The agency acquired its first federal funding from the Urban Mass Transportation Administration for the 1978 fiscal year, to be used on the purchase of 18 new buses as well as bus stop amenities, such as stop signs and shelters.

=== Growth and contracted service ===
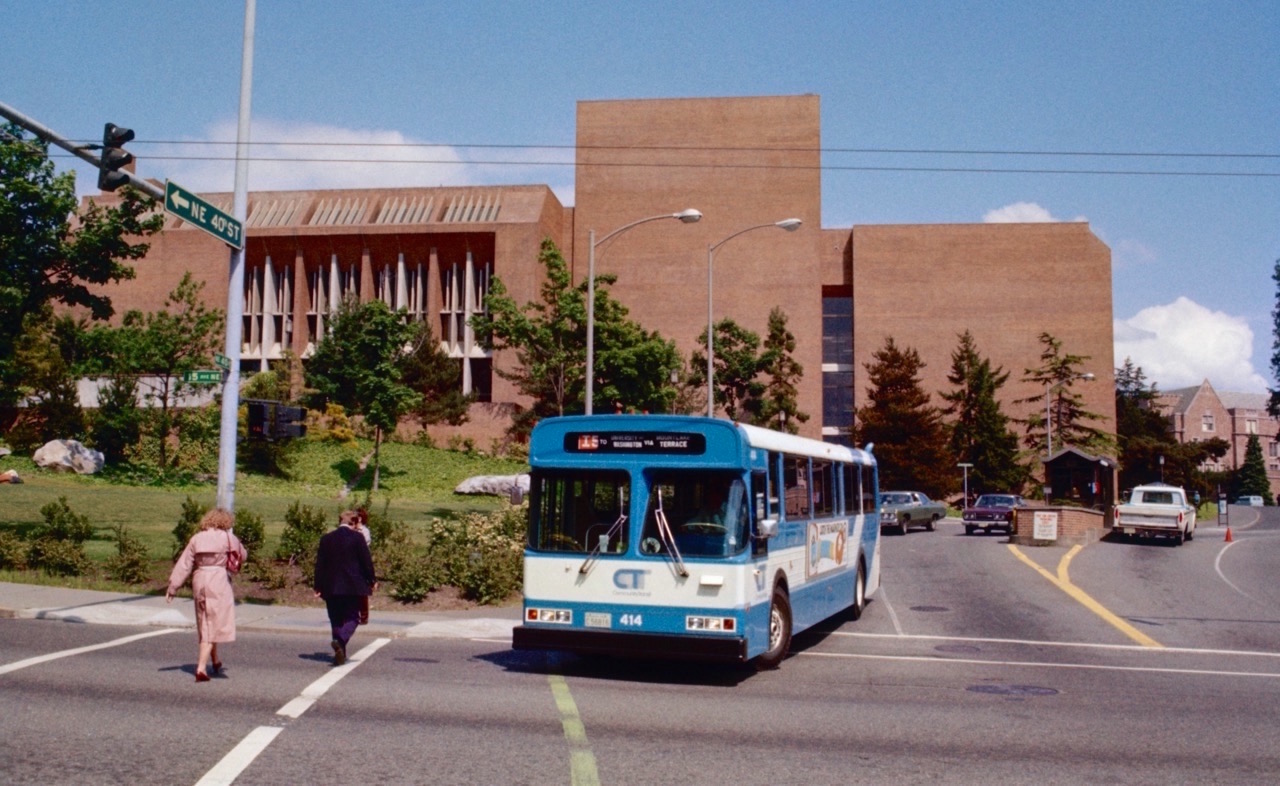
A 1981 Flyer D901 bus in Community Transit's original livery leaving the University of Washington campus in 1982

Community Transit was selected as the official name of the agency on June 19, 1979, recommended by Seattle-based public relations firm McConnell Company ahead of the winners of a public contest held by SCPTBA two years prior. CT continued to grow through the end of the decade, annexing the cities of Arlington, Lake Stevens, Monroe, Granite Falls, Mukilteo, Stanwood and Sultan into the PTBA by 1980; the bus system had the largest growth in ridership within the state in 1980, with local routes gaining 68.3 percent more riders and Metro-operated "Cream Buses" to Seattle gaining 21.4 percent more riders. Metro altered their numbering scheme for Snohomish County routes in 1981, creating the 400-series of routes to coincide with the opening of the state's largest park and ride in Lynnwood (which would later become Lynnwood Transit Center). The annexations of outlying communities in northern and eastern Snohomish County and the completion of park and rides in Edmonds and Mountlake Terrace saw ridership rise to over 3 million passengers by 1983.

Community Transit launched its longest commuter route, between Seattle and Stanwood, in October 1987. They took over the remaining Metro commuter routes to Seattle in 1989, after commuter service was subcontracted to American Transportation Enterprises in 1986. The move to a private carrier was opposed by both Metro and the Amalgamated Transit Union, but the introduction of 49 air conditioned coaches by ATE led to a 25 percent increase in ridership by January 1987. Commuter express service via Interstate 405 from CT park and rides in South Snohomish County to the Eastside cities of Bellevue and Redmond began in 1988 and 1990, respectively, while Seattle service was expanded with weekend service in 1990. The agency dedicated its own 20-acre (8.1 ha) bus base at Kasch Park in 1985, replacing shared operations with the Edmonds School District and Everett Transit, at a cost of $4.8 million (equivalent to $144 million in 2025) that was mostly funded by the Urban Mass Transportation Administration.

=== 1990s and 2000s ===
==== Fraud investigation ====
CT was involved in a criminal investigation conducted by the Federal Bureau of Investigation (FBI) in the mid-1990s of Ed's Transmission, a transmission shop in Everett used by the agency for bus parts. Detectives from the FBI and Snohomish County Sheriff seized records from both parties and began a two-month audit of Community Transit management. The auditors released a report that criticized the management style of Executive Director Ken Graska and his department heads, leading to the former's resignation in December 1993 after nine years at his position. Federal prosecutors accused Ralph Woodall, the 50-year-old co-owner of the shop, of 15 counts of mail fraud after intentionally overbilling for transmission repairs. Community Transit Maintenance Director Michael Lynn resigned after confessing that he had accepted gifts from Woodall in exchange for sending all of CT's transmissions to Ed's Transmissions without going through competitive bidding. A U.S. District Court jury found Woodall guilty of 15 counts of mail fraud in December 1996, with Judge John C. Coughenour sentencing him to 2.5 years in federal prison the following May, along with Ed's Transmission being forced to pay a $825,000 settlement after a civil suit was filed.

==== Proposed consolidations with Everett Transit ====
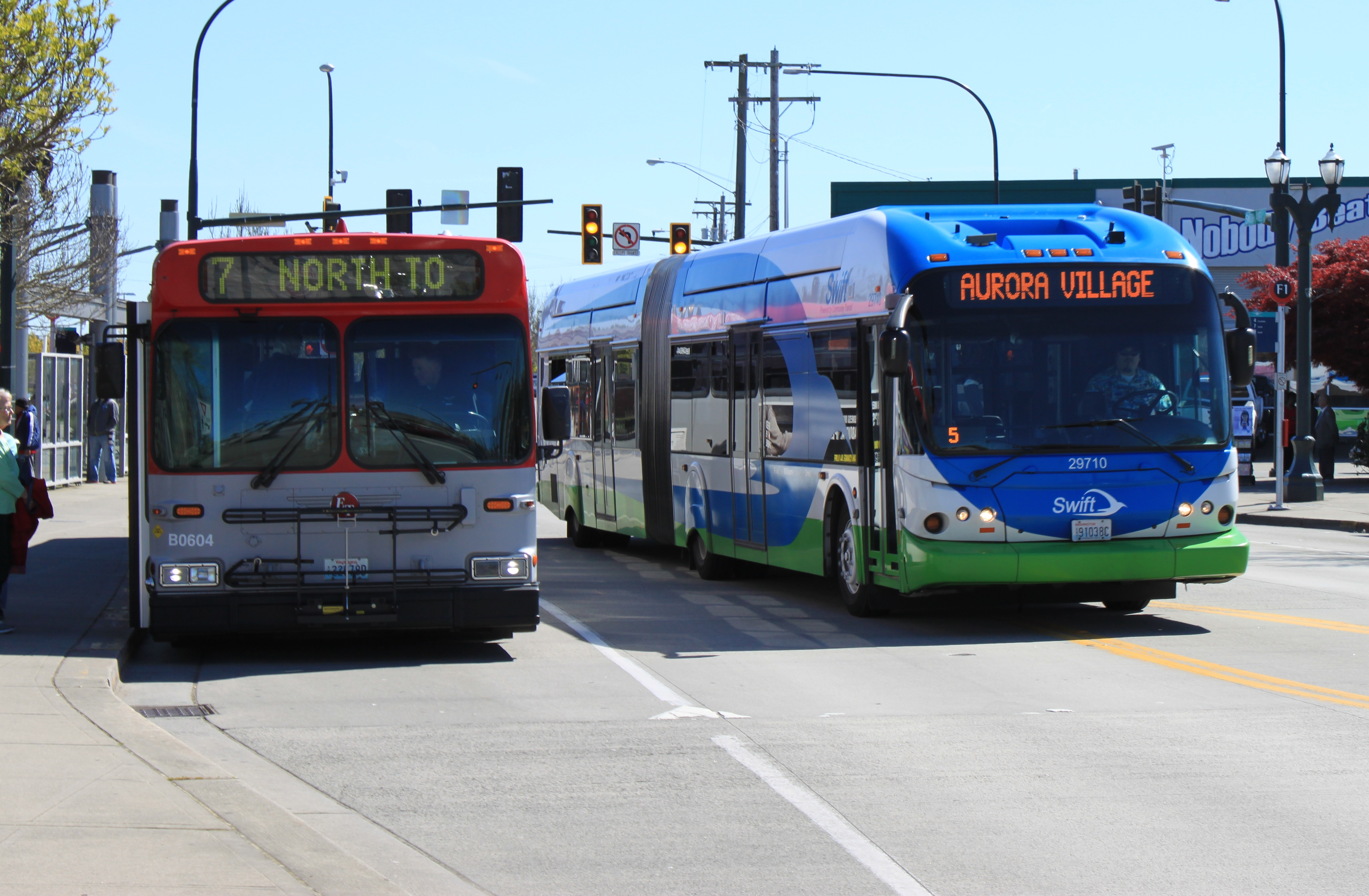
A Swift coach passing a parked Everett Transit bus at Everett Station

Attempted mergers of Community Transit with Everett Transit have been proposed by the Washington State Legislature and the CT Board since the formation of SNOTRAN in 1974. The relative success of Community Transit in the late 1970s and 1980s prompted the Community Transit Board to propose consolidation with Everett Transit in 1988, though long-term planning under SNOTRAN for both agencies worked under the assumption that there would be no merger by 2000. In 1990, a second proposal was rejected by the Everett City Council after consultants determined that a merger would only save $350,000 per year in deadheading for Community Transit and that both staffs would need to be retained because of the lack of service duplication between the two agencies. Throughout the 1990s, successive legislative bills proposing a merger were passed through the House Transportation Committee, but failed to gain support elsewhere because of successful lobbying from the City of Everett. State voters approved Referendum 49 in November 1998, including state motor-vehicle excise tax revenue for city-run transit in Everett and Yakima. While Everett Transit gained $4.5 million (equivalent to $8.89 million in 2025) in new annual funding, CT was set to lose $1 million (equivalent to $1.98 million in 2025) over the next five years in addition to the $2 million (equivalent to $3.95 million in 2025) used to operate service within Everett annually. The large cuts brought on by the passing of Initiative 695 and subsequent loss of excise tax revenue forced both agencies to consider merging in 2000, with savings of an estimated $1.7 million per year (equivalent to $3.09 million in 2025) according to a study commissioned by Community Transit. As a result of the failed mergers, CT proposed truncating its routes at Everett city limits, but ultimately decided to provide limited-stop service on its routes through Everett to the newly constructed Everett Station in 2002. Community Transit and Everett Transit signed their first partnership agreement in 2007, with Everett helping fund Swift bus rapid transit through its service area and allowing CT to operate the route in exchange for the expansion of ET service into unincorporated areas surrounding Everett. The two agencies further collaborated with Sound Transit and the Washington State Department of Transportation in the construction of the South Everett Freeway Station the following year.

==== Fleet expansions and new services ====
In their most recent expansion in 1997, the Snohomish County PTBA annexed the Eastmont and Silver Firs census-designated places between Everett and Mill Creek, as well as the Tulalip Indian Reservation west of Marysville. During the same year, CT awarded its $31.8 million (equivalent to $63.8 million in 2025) commuter service contract to Grosvenor Bus Lines and replaced their first subcontractor, Ryder/ATE Management. The agency introduced the first low-floor articulated buses in the United States into its fleet in 1999, purchasing 17 60-foot-long (18 m) buses from New Flyer to improve accessibility for older and disabled riders. Service improvements throughout the 1990s, including raising service hours to over 11 million, led to ridership peaking at 8.8 million by the end of the decade and the agency's 100 millionth rider being celebrated in April 2000. The passage of Initiative 695 in 1999, which capped the state motor-vehicle excise tax at $30, forced transit agencies throughout the state to cut service in anticipation of lower revenue. Facing the loss of $18 million (equivalent to $33.7 million in 2025), or 30 percent of its annual operating budget, Community Transit eliminated all weekend service and increased fares on its routes in February 2000. With the service cuts, CT began its VanGO program to donate its retired paratransit minibuses to nonprofit organizations in Snohomish County instead of auctioning them off. Saturday service was reinstated in September 2000, using emergency funds approved by the CT Board, while Sunday service returned in 2001 after the passage of a 0.3 percentage-point tax increase by voters in the PTBA. Further restoration of service came in 2003, with increased frequency and the replacement of 50 buses in the agency's fleet made possible by a budget surplus and the sales tax increase approved in 2002, and in 2005, with increased fares.

Community Transit introduced its current logo and slogan in 2005, replacing an older one in use since 1986 and retaining its blue-and-white color scheme, as part of the roll-out of the first New Flyer Invero buses in the United States. CT began a three-month pilot project in September 2005 that brought Wi-Fi access to buses on its longest route, Route 422 between Stanwood and Seattle, with hopes of attracting customers and remote workers to its routes. The pilot project was deemed a success and expanded into the "Surf and Ride" program on all Route 422 trips in 2006, as well as select trips on Routes 406 and 441 from Edmonds to Seattle and Overlake on the Eastside, respectively; the Wi-Fi program was canceled in 2010, with the removal of equipment in buses brought on by low customer response, budget constraints and the adoption of improved cellular networks that support mobile browsing on smartphones.

CT and First Transit signed their commuter contract in 2007, continuing the operation of commuter routes to Seattle. Community Transit debuted the first double-decker buses in the Puget Sound region during a year-long test in 2007, eventually buying its own fleet of Alexander Dennis Enviro500s for its "Double Tall" fleet to be used on commuter services. A PTBA expansion into the unincorporated areas of Cathcart, Clearview and Maltby was attempted during the 2008 general elections, but failed to gain a majority vote. In November 2009, after three years of planning and a year of construction, Community Transit debuted the first bus rapid transit line in Washington, Swift. The service replaced Route 100 on State Route 99 between Aurora Village in Shoreline and Everett Station, featuring 12-minute headways, off-board fare payment and transit signal priority.

=== Service restoration and COVID-19 pandemic ===
The Great Recession of the late 2000s and subsequent loss of an estimated $180 million (equivalent to $266 million in 2025) in sales tax revenue in Snohomish County forced CT to cut service by 15 percent in June 2010, including the elimination of all service on Sundays and major holidays, to save $16 million (equivalent to $23.6 million in 2025) until 2012. A second cut, with 20 percent of service eliminated, took place in February 2012; the CT Board rejected a major restructure that would have truncated its northern and eastern express service to Seattle at Lynnwood Transit Center during this cut, instead opting to preserve its commuter service.

Despite the decline in service hours, Community Transit and Sound Transit had record ridership for Snohomish County routes during the Super Bowl XLVIII parade in Downtown Seattle in February 2014, carrying a total of 22,500 passengers on 50 extra trips into Seattle. In March, the 2014 Oso mudslide destroyed a portion of State Route 530 and forced CT to re-route its service to Darrington through Skagit County, offering one-seat service to Smokey Point and Everett Station in the interim as Route 231. The partial reopening of State Route 530 in June and full reopening in September restored the original Route 230 on its original route, now extended to Smokey Point.

Community Transit began restoring cut service in September 2014, adding 13 percent of its former bus hours primarily to improve midday service. In June 2015, CT restored its Sunday and holiday service as part of a 27,000-hour expansion, representing 20 percent of the 2010 reduction, funded by recovering sales tax revenue and a 25-cent increase in fares the following month. The agency was given approval from the state legislature in July 2015 to increase sales taxes by an additional 0.3%, dependent on voter approval via a ballot measure during the November 2015 election that was eventually won, to fund a new Swift line as well as local service expansion. The second Swift route, the Green Line, opened on March 24, 2019, and cost $73 million to construct. It connects the Seaway Transit Center, a new facility next to the Boeing Everett Factory, to Mill Creek and Canyon Park in Bothell.

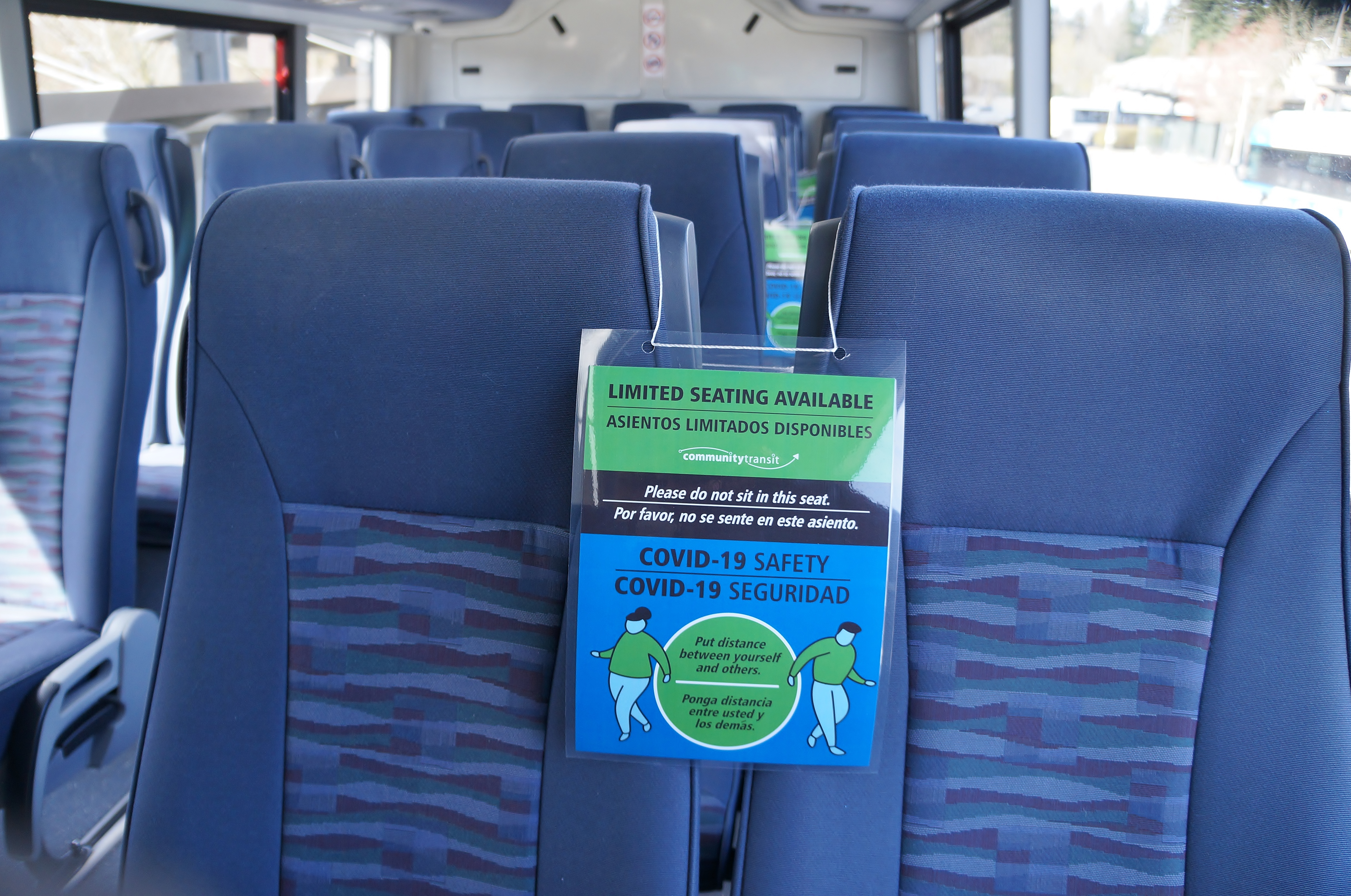
A social distancing sign on a Community Transit-operated Sound Transit Express bus in April 2020

The agency, like most in the United States, saw major declines in ridership beginning in March 2020 due to the COVID-19 pandemic and widespread use of remote work. Daily ridership declined from 40,000 in February to 16,500 by late March, with an 80 percent decline in ridership on commuter routes to Seattle. Community Transit implemented stricter cleaning and screening standards and suspended the collection of fares. Passengers were required to use the rear door of buses, with the exception of those requiring accessible seating, and some seats were cordoned off. By May, 35 percent of service had been cancelled or suspended, including several commuter routes that had no passengers. Fare collection resumed on July 1 after an estimated $4.2 million in revenue had been lost due to the lack of fares and lower retail activity; by June, Community Transit was carrying an average of 12,500 riders per day—a 66 percent decline from normal figures. The agency's return to fare collection and front door use was criticized by drivers, who had also requested the installation of plexiglass barriers for the driver compartment.

=== End of commuter service ===
Community Transit received federal funding from the 2020 CARES Act to backfill lost sales tax and fare revenue during the early stages of the COVID-19 pandemic. The agency announced plans to gradually restore service in line with the recovery of revenues as well as planned service changes to accommodate the expansion of Link light rail. By late 2021, ridership on Community Transit's Seattle commuter routes had increased by 70 percent over the prior year but remained below their pre-pandemic levels. After Northgate station opened on October 2, 2021, the 800-series routes to the University District were truncated at the station and had their frequency increased with the addition of 48 new trips. Total ridership across the system had recovered to 50 percent of pre-pandemic levels by the end of the year.

The agency announced a mandatory COVID-19 vaccination policy for employees in October 2021 with a deadline of January 1, 2022, with some religious exemptions. Due to several employees who left or contracted COVID-19, Community Transit began cancelling trips on some routes in January; the number of cancelled trips increased to 164 in the March 2022 service change, which primarily affected commuter routes to Downtown Seattle. Ridership continued to increase in early 2022 due to high gas prices, reaching 100,000 weekly boardings in late March. Community Transit began construction of their third bus rapid transit corridor, the Swift Orange Line, in April 2022 with federal and state grants to fund most of the $79.4 million cost. An on-demand microtransit system, named the Zip Shuttle, launched in October 2022 in Lynnwood and Alderwood to connect with Community Transit service.

Community Transit's largest restructure, to redirect commuters to the Lynnwood Link Extension, was rolled out in several phases beginning with the opening of the Swift Orange Line on March 30, 2024. The 11-mile (18 km) route connects the Lynnwood City Center light rail station to Edmonds College, Alderwood Mall, and Mill Creek. The light rail expansion opened on August 30 with stations in Lynnwood, Mountlake Terrace, and Shoreline that would become major transfer points for Community Transit buses. On September 14, almost all of the agency's commuter routes to Downtown Seattle and Northgate station were eliminated as part of the second phase of the bus restructure. They were replaced by a new network of express routes that connect to light rail trains in Lynnwood and Mountlake Terrace; the service hours used to operate commuter routes, which comprised 30 percent of Community Transit's budget, were reallocated towards more frequent local routes on weekdays and weekends. To promote the changes, Community Transit filmed a travel series with presenter Rick Steves and an educational series with game show host Ken Jennings—both television personalities from Snohomish County.

As part of the restructure, the previous commuter fare was eliminated in September 2024 and replaced by a single systemwide fare that applied to all routes. The final remaining commuter route to serve Downtown Seattle, route 424 from Snohomish and Monroe, was replaced by a truncated route to Bellevue Downtown station in June 2026 following the extension of 2 Line service across Lake Washington. Community Transit also began to move fixed routes from subcontractor Transdev to in-house operations in March 2025 and completed the transition in August 2026. The post-restructure network is expected to comprise 35 routes—a reduction from the original 46 routes—and include more local service in addition to intra-county express routes. The agency's long-range plan, adopted in December 2023, calls for further expansion of the Swift network and a full transition to a fleet of 100 zero-emissions buses by 2044 at a cost of $1.4 billion. A fourth line, the Swift Gold Line, is planned to open between Everett and Smokey Point by 2029, followed by an extension of the Green Line into Downtown Bothell.

On November 5, 2026, Community Transit approved an agreement with the Everett city government to consolidate its system with Everett Transit and formally annex the city. The annexation is scheduled for April 1, 2027, and is planned to be followed by service increases in Everett by 2031.

== Regional connections ==
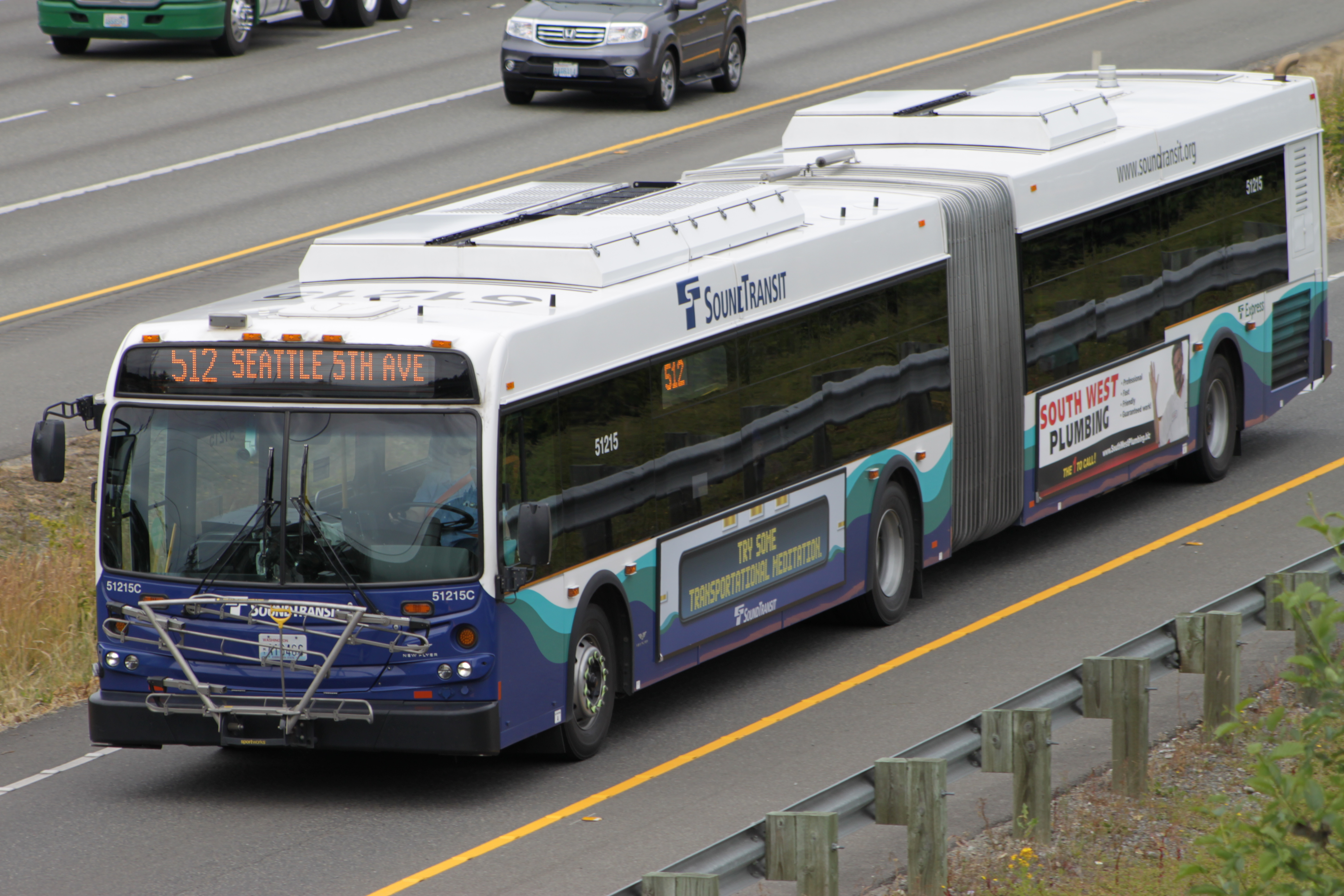
A Sound Transit Express bus on route 512, operated by Community Transit.

In 1992, Community Transit and Everett Transit agreed to break away from SNOTRAN, which served as their planning and administrative body in addition to disbursing federal funding, after CT complained of a "lack of communication" between the three agencies. The county agency formally disbanded on December 31, 1994, replaced by the Joint Regional Policy Committee (JRPC) that formed four years prior to coordinate transit planning for the entire Puget Sound region. A regional transit agency was formed in 1993 under the JRPC, organizing a $6.7 billion (equivalent to $14.2 billion in 2025) plan for regional transit that was put to a vote on March 14, 1995, failing to pass outside of Seattle, Mercer Island and Shoreline. The plan included a commuter rail line on the BNSF Scenic Subdivision between Everett, Mukilteo, Edmonds and King Street Station in Seattle, a light rail line from Lynnwood to Seattle following Interstate 5, and express bus service to light rail stations. The following November, the smaller "Sound Move" plan was approved at a cost of $3.9 billion (equivalent to $8.01 billion in 2025), including commuter rail from Everett to Seattle and express buses on Interstate 5 from Everett and Lynnwood to Seattle and Bellevue.

The regional transit agency, renamed to Sound Transit the following year, began operating its Sound Transit Express buses under contract with Community Transit in September 1999. The new express buses connected park and rides in southwestern Snohomish County, the only part of Community Transit's service area within the Sound Transit taxing district, to Downtown Seattle, including the newly opened, 1,000-stall Ash Way Park & Ride in northern Lynnwood. Sound Transit funded several capital projects to improve bus service on the Interstate 5 corridor, including direct access ramps from HOV lanes to Lynnwood and Ash Way park and rides that opened in 2004 and 2005, respectively. In 2011, the existing Mountlake Terrace park and ride was expanded with an 890-stall parking garage and bus platforms in the median of I-5 connected by a pedestrian bridge.

Commuter rail service to Snohomish County on the Sounder North Line began in December 2003 with a single round-trip connecting Everett and Edmonds to King Street Station in Seattle during rush hour. Service was expanded to a second round-trip in June 2005 and a third round-trip in September 2007, while an infill station opened at Mukilteo in May 2008, also bringing additional service in the form of a fourth round-trip the following September.

An expansion of the Link light rail system in the "Sound Transit 2" package was approved in November 2008, including 54 percent of southwestern Snohomish County voters, funding the extension of light rail to Lynnwood. The 8.5-mile-long (13.7 km) extension opened on August 30, 2024, with stations in Shoreline, Mountlake Terrace, and Lynnwood. On September 14, Community Transit debuted its redeveloped bus network and eliminated almost all of its Downtown Seattle express service in favor of new commuter routes connecting to Lynnwood and Mountlake Terrace stations. Community Transit and King County Metro are contracted to operate shuttle buses to serve Link stations during disruptions to train operations. With the passage of Sound Transit 3 in 2016, light rail service to Everett via Paine Field is anticipated to begin service in 2041.

== Administration ==
The Kasch Park Operating Base, one of two bus bases for Community Transit

Community Transit is administered by a nine-member board of directors, composed of two members of the Snohomish County Council, two elected officials from PTBA cities with populations of 30,000 or more, three elected officials from cities with between 10,000 and 30,000, and two elected officials from cities with less than 10,000, that meets monthly at their headquarters in Everett. The board is led by a non-voting chief executive officer, a position held by Ric Ilgenfritz since January 2021. CT adopted an operating budget of $248.6 million for 2025; 75 percent of revenue is provided by a 0.9 percent sales tax within the PTBA, the maximum authorized for transit agencies under state law, while a combination of fares and federal funding comprise the remainder. The agency has 1,903.5 full-time equivalent positions, divided into eight departments.

CT is headquartered at their Cascade Administration Building at 2312 W Casino Road in the Paine Field industrial area of South Everett, located south of the Boeing Everett Factory. The two-story facility opened in 2022 at a call center that had been renovated into a larger office building. The 87,065-square-foot (8,088.6 m^{2}) operations building at the Hardeson Road Base (formerly Merrill Creek) opened in 1997 and is the primary bus base for the agency's fleet of buses and vans.

== Services ==
The service areas and route networks of Community Transit (blue) and Everett Transit (red)

Community Transit operates fixed bus routes throughout a public transportation benefit area (PTBA) that comprises 1,309 square miles (3,390 km^{2}) of Snohomish County. The PTBA had a population of 644,949 in 2025, about 73.8 percent of the county's total residents, and covers most of the urbanized area. The city of Everett is excluded from the PTBA and has its own municipal transit system. Community Transit has 34 bus routes that are divided into three types of service: three bus rapid transit routes under the Swift brand; local and rural routes that range in frequency and span of service; and express routes that travel to regional destinations, including Link light rail stations. The local routes are numbered in the 100s for service in southern Snohomish County and 200s in northern and eastern Snohomish County; the express routes use the 900s. The agency maintains approximately 1,700 bus stops, of which 21 percent have shelters or weather protection; Swift buses use dedicated stations that have large shelters, off-board fare payment kiosks, and other features. CT is also contracted to provide all-day and peak-only Sound Transit Express service on five routes within Snohomish County that extends to Seattle and Bellevue. Typically, service changes occur in March and September, in response to ridership and requests from the community.

Buses serve 22 park and rides and transit centers located throughout Snohomish County with a combined capacity of over 9,000 vehicles and 200 bicycles. The largest facilities, primarily located in southwest Snohomish County, include weatherproof bicycle lockers in addition to automobile parking. The majority of park and rides are owned by the Washington State Department of Transportation and maintained by Community Transit and other service providers. Until 2024, these park and ride lots were primarily used by peak-only commuter bus routes to Boeing in Everett, Downtown Seattle, and Northgate station.

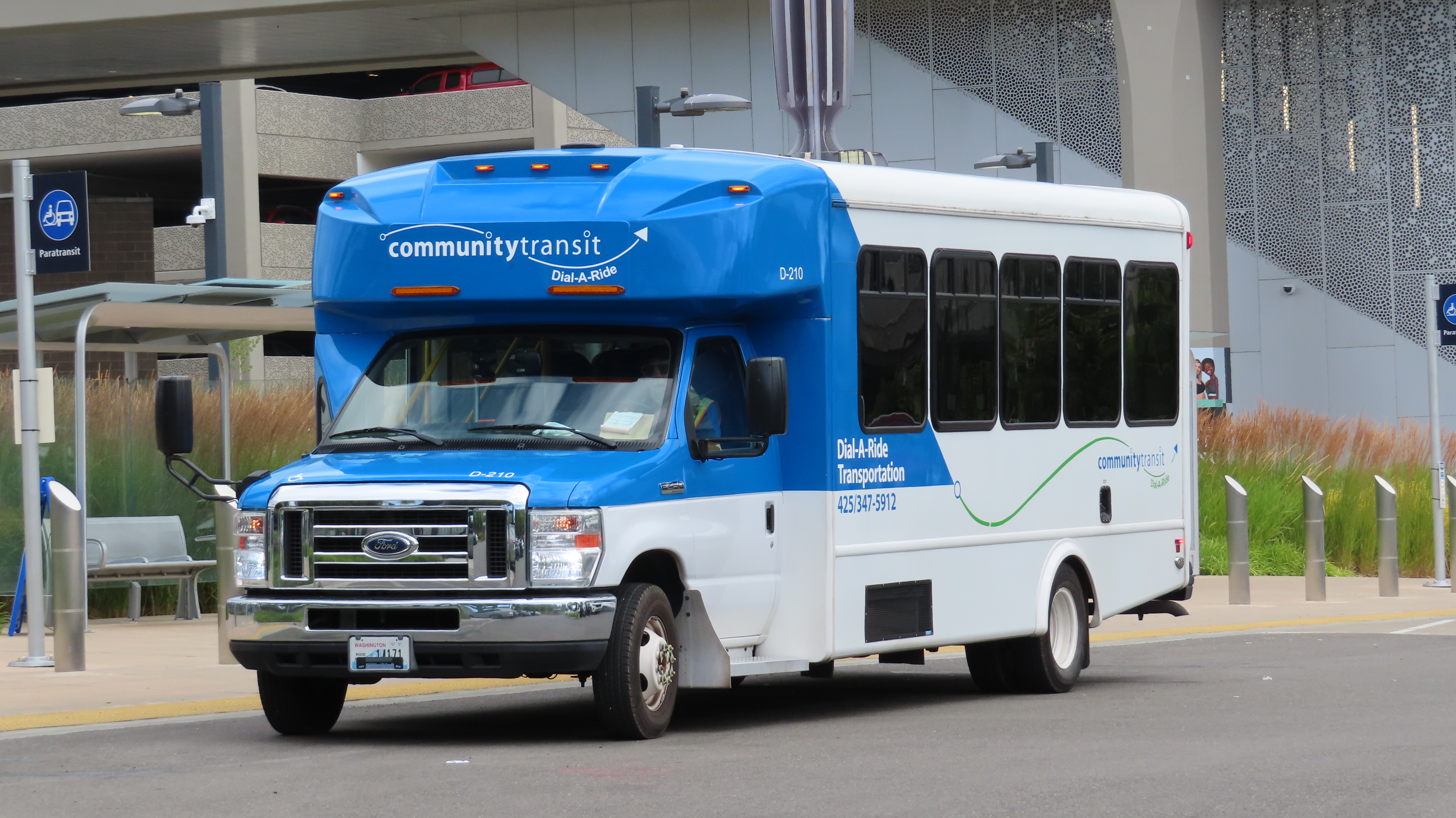
A paratransit minibus at Lynnwood City Center station

In addition to bus service, CT operates a vanpool program with a fleet of 344 vans originating from the Kasch Park operating base in Everett. The fleet comes in configurations with six or twelve seats, with some vans equipped with bicycle racks. The vanpool system provided over 441,000 trips in 2025; in 2019, Community Transit had the 12th largest vanpool system in the United States by ridership. CT leases vanpool lots, called "park and pool lots", from local churches and other private parties at 14 locations in the county with a total capacity of 463 parking stalls. Dial-a-ride transportation (DART) paratransit service is also offered by Community Transit, contracted through Transdev, for qualifying customers within 0.75 miles (1.21 km) of local CT routes during regular operating hours. As of 2025, CT has approximately 5,500 registered DART users and the system carries over 163,000 trips annually.

An on-demand microtransit system, Zip Shuttle, launched in October 2022 to serve Lynnwood and the area around Alderwood Mall. It operates similar to ride-hailing service with fixed fares (including payment via ORCA cards) and is available to all members of the public; trips are requested through an app or phone call. It was originally a one-year pilot until being made a permanent service in October 2023. The system expanded to zones in Arlington, Darrington, and Lake Stevens in December 2024 under a contract with Via Transportation, which took over operations of the Alderwood system the following year.

=== Ridership ===
Historical bus ridership (Note: Does not include paratransit, vanpool, and microtransit)
Year	Ridership	%±	Ref.
1977	951,000	—	
1980	2,474,841	260.2%	
1985	3,294,312	33.1%	
1990	4,004,748	21.6%	
1995	5,911,473	47.6%	
2000	7,333,570	24.1%	
2005	9,824,546	33.9%	
2010	8,979,937	−8.6%	
2015	8,935,227	−0.1%	
2020	5,305,854	−40.6%	
2025	8,616,469	62.4%	

In 2025, Community Transit carried a total of 9.5 million trips across all of its services, of which 90 percent was on its fixed bus routes. The agency had the third-highest 2024 ridership among transit agencies in the Puget Sound region behind King County Metro and Sound Transit. A decade prior, Community Transit had been fourth among transit agencies locally, behind Pierce Transit.

=== Fares ===
Fares on Community Transit buses are priced into three groups: adult, youth, and reduced. An adult fare of $2.50 is charged for passengers between the ages of 19 and 64, a $0 youth fare is charged for passengers 18 years old or younger, and the reduced $1.00 fare is charged for passengers over the age of 65 or those with disabilities or Medicare card holders. On July 1, 2019, Community Transit introduced a low-income fare as part of the regional ORCA Lift program. Youth fares were made free with valid ID on September 1, 2022, as part of a state grant program that lasts until 2039.

The regional ORCA card was introduced as an integrated smart card for transit agencies in the Puget Sound region on April 20, 2009, allowing users to load monthly passes and value through an e-purse web interface. The card also allowed free transfers within a two-hour period between transit agencies of equal value, with the difference for higher fare subtracted from the e-purse or prompting for cash. While initially available for no fee, effective March 1, 2010, a $5 cost was added when ordering a standard adult or youth ORCA card. CT removed their paper transfers on January 1, 2010, after the ORCA card made them obsolete.

Community Transit also offers monthly passes through local higher education institutions, including Edmonds College, the University of Washington, Cascadia College, and the Lynnwood Campus of Central Washington University. Dial-a-ride transportation, a type of paratransit service operated by Community Transit, has a flat fare of $2.50 without discounts or separate categories. ORCA cards are not accepted on DART, replaced by tickets and monthly passes for frequent users.

== Fleet ==
As of December 2025, Community Transit has a fleet of 680 vehicles that are maintained at its operating bases at Hardeson Road and Kasch Park. The fleet of 256 fixed-route buses is generally composed of 30-foot (9.1 m) and 40-foot (12 m) vehicles, as well as specialized 60-foot (18 m) articulated buses and 42-foot (13 m) double-decker buses. Buses typically are powered by diesel engines, with the exception of 15 hybrid diesel–electric buses used on Swift Bus Rapid Transit and some local routes. Community Transit expects to purchase 55 to 60 new buses by 2027 to support increased transit service and replace older vehicles. The agency began testing battery electric buses in early 2023 and purchased the region's first hydrogen-powered fuel cell bus in 2024.

Since 1995, all Community Transit buses are low-floor and equipped with a hydraulic or pneumatic "kneeling" device in addition to wheelchair lifts for accessibility. CT buses have also featured at least two bicycle racks located in front of the windshield since 1996; Swift bus rapid transit buses have three bicycle racks located inside the vehicle for reduced dwell times.

In addition to its bus fleet, Community Transit maintains 345 vans for its vanpool program and 79 paratransit minibuses equipped with wheelchair lifts for dial-a-ride service. Retired vanpool and DART vehicles are donated to local non-profit organizations through the VanGO program, which has gifted 106 vans since its establishment in 2000.

=== Double Tall ===
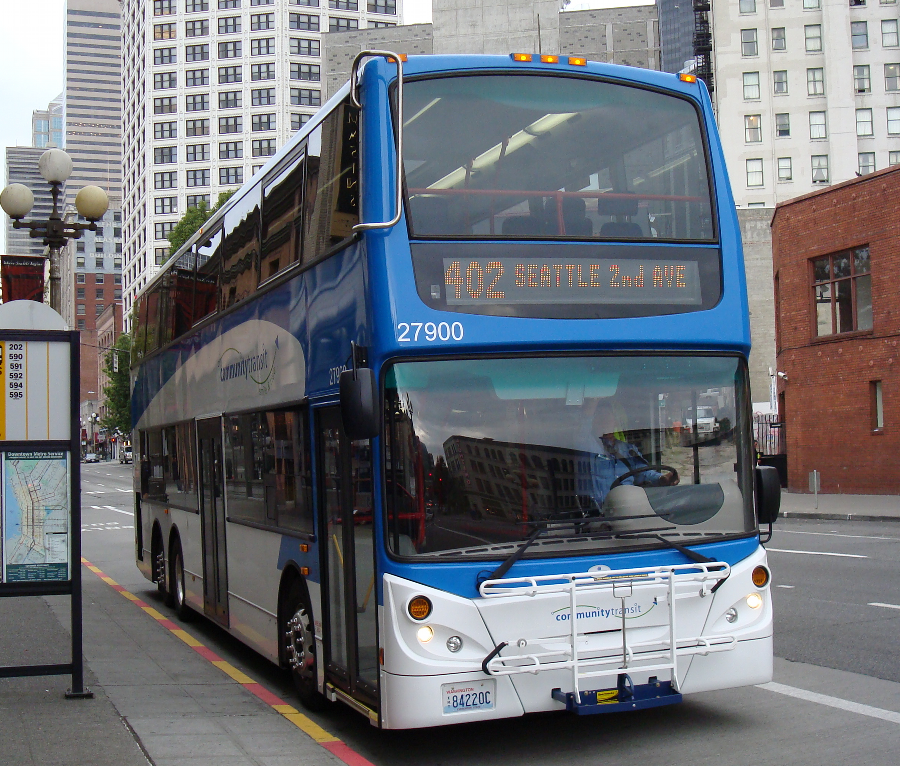
The leased Alexander Dennis Enviro500 in Community Transit livery, pictured in Downtown Seattle in 2007.

As of 2025, Community Transit has a fleet of 46 double-decker buses, among the largest for public transit agencies in the United States and second in the region behind Sound Transit. They are branded as the "Double Tall" in reference to the double tall cup size at Seattle-based coffee chain Starbucks. The Alexander Dennis Enviro500 buses are 42 feet (13 m) long and 14 feet (4 m) tall; they are able to carry 77 to 81 seated passengers with standing room for 20 more. They were able to replace the capacity of standard articulated buses in a smaller footprint. The double-deckers were introduced during a one-year pilot project in 2007, on lease from Alexander Dennis for $15,000 per month.

Prior to the end of the trial in 2008, CT placed an order of 23 Enviro500s, scheduled to be delivered and put into service in 2010. The initial order was not fulfilled until 2011, when manufacturing was moved to an ElDorado plant in Riverside, California to meet federal Buy America Act requirements. A second order of 17 Enviro500s, to replace older articulated buses, was made in 2013 and went into service in late 2015. By 2018, Community Transit had 62 double-decker buses—the second-most in the United States behind RTC Transit in Las Vegas.

Sound Transit introduced five of its own double-decker buses in 2015 for use on their Snohomish County routes under contract with Community Transit. Sound Transit plans to eventually replace its entire Snohomish County fleet with double-deckers in the near-term future, beginning with 32 additional buses in 2018. Community Transit also ordered 17 double-decker buses, with an option to purchase 40 more, as part of the joint procurement with Sound Transit and Kitsap Transit. The first set of Double Tall buses, which entered service in 2011, were retired in 2023 and sold at auctions to sightseeing and cruise companies.
