= Pinehurst, Seattle =

Neighborhood of Seattle, Washington

Coordinates: 47°43′16.3″N 122°19′15.4″W

Pinehurst is a neighborhood in the Northgate area of Seattle, Washington, United States. It is bounded by NE 145th Street to the north, NE Northgate Way to the south, I-5 to the west, and Lake City Way to the east. These boundaries were determined by the Pinehurst Community Council. Pinehurst's northern boundary of NE 145th Street makes Pinehurst one of the northernmost neighborhoods in the city of Seattle.

Pinehurst has two neighborhood parks, Pinehurst Playfield and Pinehurst Pocket Park, and the neighborhood is bounded on the north by Jackson Park and Thornton Creek Park #1. Pinehurst is also the home to a model natural drainage system, the Pinehurst Green Grid.

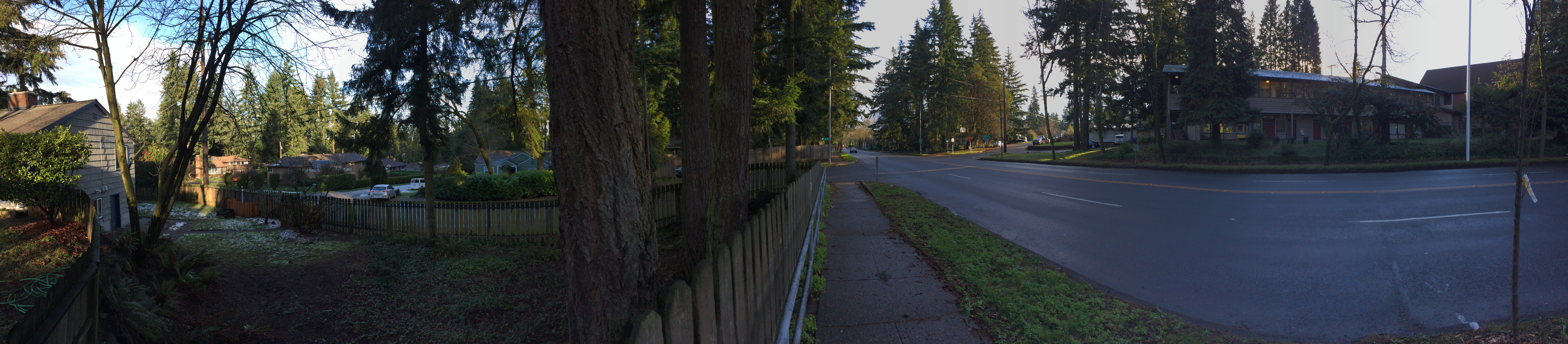
Roosevelt Way Northeast in Pinehurst

== History ==
Coast Salish people have lived throughout the Seattle area for thousands of years. dxwx̌úbəd (Silenced [or Quieted] Place) was a village at the mouth of Thornton Creek on Lake Washington, and the creek valley by the current Northgate Mall and North Seattle Community College was named ɬuq̓ʷqid (Bald [or Peeled] Head). Duwamish people fished on the creek and may have harvested highbush cranberries, marsh tea, and other goods at the marsh.

After the 1870s, when German immigrants moved near Thornton Creek, they began to clear surrounding forests and bogs to create farmland. The area became known as Little Germany. Development mostly continued along Lake Washington until cars gained popularity and Bothell Road (now Lake City Way) was progressively paved throughout the 1910s. Farmland in Pinehurst, Chelsea, and Kenwood was subdivided by developers in 1913. During this time, Lake City Way became a popular nightlife area and tourist destination, while the surrounding neighborhoods remained predominantly agricultural. However, when World War II ended, this area rapidly grew into suburbs for young families moving to the area.

During the early 1900s, developers of Pinehurst, along with other Seattle neighborhoods, used racial restrictive covenants to block people of color from buying property or living in the neighborhood. One covenant in southeast Pinehurst covered over 400 properties.

In 1949, Lake City incorporated as a town with 40,000 residents, and it included the Pinehurst area. In 1950, Pinehurst Primary School opened as part of the Shoreline School District, and the school quickly expanded over the next decade. Northgate Mall opened in 1950 and became immensely successful, prompting growth in surrounding neighborhoods. Schools in Pinehurst, Oak Lake, and Haller Lake became too crowded, prompting the creation of Northgate Elementary and the annexation of the Northgate area into Seattle in 1952. Pinehurst Primary also moved into the Seattle School District that year. Other parts of Pinehurst and Lake City, up to 145th St, were annexed into Seattle in 1954.

In 1984, Seattle's Alternate School #1 moved into Pinehurst Primary School from Bailey Gatzert Elementary. The school focused on hands-on, experiential learning and had a unique curriculum among public schools. 2013, the alternate school combined with the city's Native Heritage program, and took the name Licton Springs K-8 in preparation to move neighborhoods.

By 1968, racial restrictive covenants in Pinehurst and the rest of Seattle were banned by the national Fair Housing Act. Real estate agent discrimination was another problem in the area, but eventually more people of color were able to move to the neighborhood. By 1982, most Korean Americans living in the Seattle area lived on the edges of the city, including in Olympic Hills and Pinehurst. In the 1990s and 2000s, many Ethiopian, Eritrean, and Somalian refugees moved to South Seattle, southwest King County, and Pinehurst. By 2010, the census estimated that 6% of the neighborhood spoke an African language. The zip code 98125, which covers Pinehurst, showed that several thousand Black and Hispanic residents lived in the area during the 2010s, with over 5,000 Asian residents, several hundred Native American, Hawaiian, and Pacific Islanders, and around 40,000 white residents. Throughout the 2010s, the neighborhood's property prices rose and commercial buildings along 15th were often redeveloped into larger buildings.

In 2016, the region voted to add three infill stations to the Link light rail's 1 Line, including a station at 130th Street near I-5. Named Pinehurst station, it serves the neighborhood and buses that connect to Haller Lake, Bitter Lake, and Lake City. The station opened on September 30, 2026. Around 2025, when Seattle updated its comprehensive plan for housing and city development, they planned to create an Urban Center in Pinehurst around the new light rail station. It would allow for more retail and restaurant use and taller buildings near the station. The updated comprehensive plan would mark the first rezone of part of Haller Lake or Pinehurst since the station was approved.
