= Mary Ann Peters (artist) =

American artist

Mary Ann Peters (1949) is an American artist. Her large scale paintings and installations deal with the themes of immigration and the refugee crisis. She is a founder of COCA (Center on Contemporary Art).

Peters received her MFA from the University of Washington in Painting and Drawing in 1977 and her BA from the University of California, Santa Barbara, CA.

Peters has completed public art projects for University of Texas, San Antonio (2002), and Port of Seattle Headquarters. In 2015, Peters received the Stranger Genius Award, a 2013 Art Matters Foundation research grant, the MacDowell Colony Pollock Krasner Fellowship in 2011, the Civita Institute Fellowship in 2004, the Artist Trust Leadership and Arts Award, and the Behnke Foundation Neddy Award in Painting in 2000. Her work is included in the collection of the Seattle Art Museum.
