= Northgate Mall (Seattle) =

The District at Northgate

- The north entrance to Northgate Mall in 2007
- Coordinates: 47°42′22″N 122°19′33″W
- Address: 401 NE Northgate Way; Seattle, Washington, U.S.
- Opened: April 21, 1950; 76 years ago
- Developer: Allied Stores
- Owner: Simon Property Group
- Architect: John Graham Jr.
- Num. of stores: 108
- Num. of anchor tenants: 2
- Floor area: 1,045,838 sq ft (97,161.5 m^{2})
- Floors: 2
- Public transit: Northgate
- Website: simon.com/mall/the-district-at-northgate

The District at Northgate, commonly referred to as Northgate Mall, is an enclosed shopping mall in Seattle, Washington, United States. It is located in the Northgate neighborhood on Interstate 5, adjacent to Northgate Way and Northgate station, a light rail station. The mall is anchored by Barnes & Noble, and Nordstrom Rack.

Northgate opened in 1950. It was the first shopping mall to be built in the post-war United States. The mall was developed by Allied Stores and was initially an open-air facility until being renovated in the 1970s. It is owned by Simon Property Group and has been under redevelopment into a mixed-use complex since 2018. The mall was renamed to Northgate Station in 2021 and the District at Northgate in 2026. The complex includes apartments, a hotel, and the practice facilities for the Seattle Kraken of the National Hockey League.

== History ==
Northgate started as an open-air shopping mall in the northern environs of Seattle. It was the first post-war shopping mall in the United States and originally went by the name of "Northgate Center", in light of its location at the north edge of Seattle (and being beyond the city limits at the time). It began business with 18 stores in April 1950, anchored by The Bon Marché. By 1952, the fully leased structure housed over seventy tenants, and also included an adjoined four-story Northgate Building medical/dental center and Northgate Theatre, which had seating for over 1,300 guests.

Northgate was the first of three malls in the Puget Sound region to be developed by Allied Stores (the parent company of the Bon Marché) and designed by Seattle architect John Graham Jr. The development was built over part of Thornton Creek, on land that had been a cranberry bog in the Maple Leaf neighborhood. Northgate was the first regional shopping center in the United States to be described as a mall, in this instance a double row of stores facing each other across a covered pedestrian walkway. It was also the first mall to have public restrooms.

In 1952, Redmond sculptor Dudley C. Carter designed and carved the 59-foot (18 m) cedar totem pole that decorated the grand entrance to the central retail corridor, known as the "Miracle Mall". The shopping center was originally anchored by the Bon Marché (which was acquired by Macy's in 2003 and briefly went by the name Bon-Macy's before the Bon name was retired in 2005). There was also a J.J. Newberry 5 and 10, a Butler Brothers Department Store and an A & P Supermarket.

Other tenants who signed on early included the National Bank of Commerce (eventually bought by Norwest Corporation and renamed Wells Fargo) and locally owned Nordstrom's Shoes, which was expanded into a full line clothing store in 1965. Opened as a Best's Apparel, a division of the Nordstrom Company since 1963, it was rebranded as Nordstrom Best in 1967 and Nordstrom in 1973. The 1965 expansion that added the Best's Apparel store also included an extension of the south end of the complex. This was anchored by a new JCPenney and QFC (Quality Food Center) grocery.

The "Miracle Mall" concourse had been partially enclosed within a "SkyShield" structure added in 1962. This was replaced in 1973 and 1974, with the mall corridor becoming fully enclosed. The official name of the shopping complex was changed to Northgate Mall at this time. Seattle-based department chain Lamonts added a store to the northern end of the concourse in 1977.

The mall was renovated again in 1997, with Toys "R" Us opening a store there in October that year. The food court also underwent renovations, and Sam Goody and Foot Locker also opened stores around this time. The new interior was completed in 1998.

Gottschalks acquired the Lamonts chain in 2000 and had a location at the mall until September 2006, before having to close due to underperforming sales. The Toys "R" Us store closed in January 2012 when its lease expired. Their place was taken by Nordstrom Rack the following year.

Capitalizing on Northgate's success, Allied Stores commissioned Graham to design the fully enclosed Tacoma Mall (opened 1964) and Tukwila's Southcenter Mall (opened 1968). By 1980, there were 123 stores at Northgate Mall. Construction began in the summer of 2006 on a 100,000-square-foot (9,300 m^{2}) lifestyle-type addition to the mall. It was completed in early 2008. The mall is anchored today by Nordstrom Rack, DSW, and Bed Bath and Beyond.

On October 8, 2018, it was announced that JCPenney would be closing in 2019. Macy's subsequently announced in January 2019 that it would also close its store in 2020; the closure was ultimately moved up to July 2019, allegedly at the request of Simon Property Group. Nordstrom closed its Northgate store on August 9, 2019, though the Nordstrom Rack remained open. Approximately 40 stores and restaurants at Northgate will remain open through the redevelopment project.

The Macy's and JCPenney anchor stores were demolished in 2019, while the Nordstrom anchor store was demolished in 2021.

=== Mixed-use redevelopment ===
In 2006, Simon Properties embarked on an expansion of Northgate Mall, in part because of the city's plan for revitalizing the Northgate neighborhood. The expansion plans included a new outdoor "urban-village" on the western end of the mall facing Interstate 5. This village opened in November 2007.

A new five level parking garage at the south end of the mall provides parking for mall users and additional transit parking. The totem pole at the north entrance of the mall was removed in September 2007. Around the same time, the original Northgate Theatre and 4-story Northgate Building were demolished to make space for new tenants.

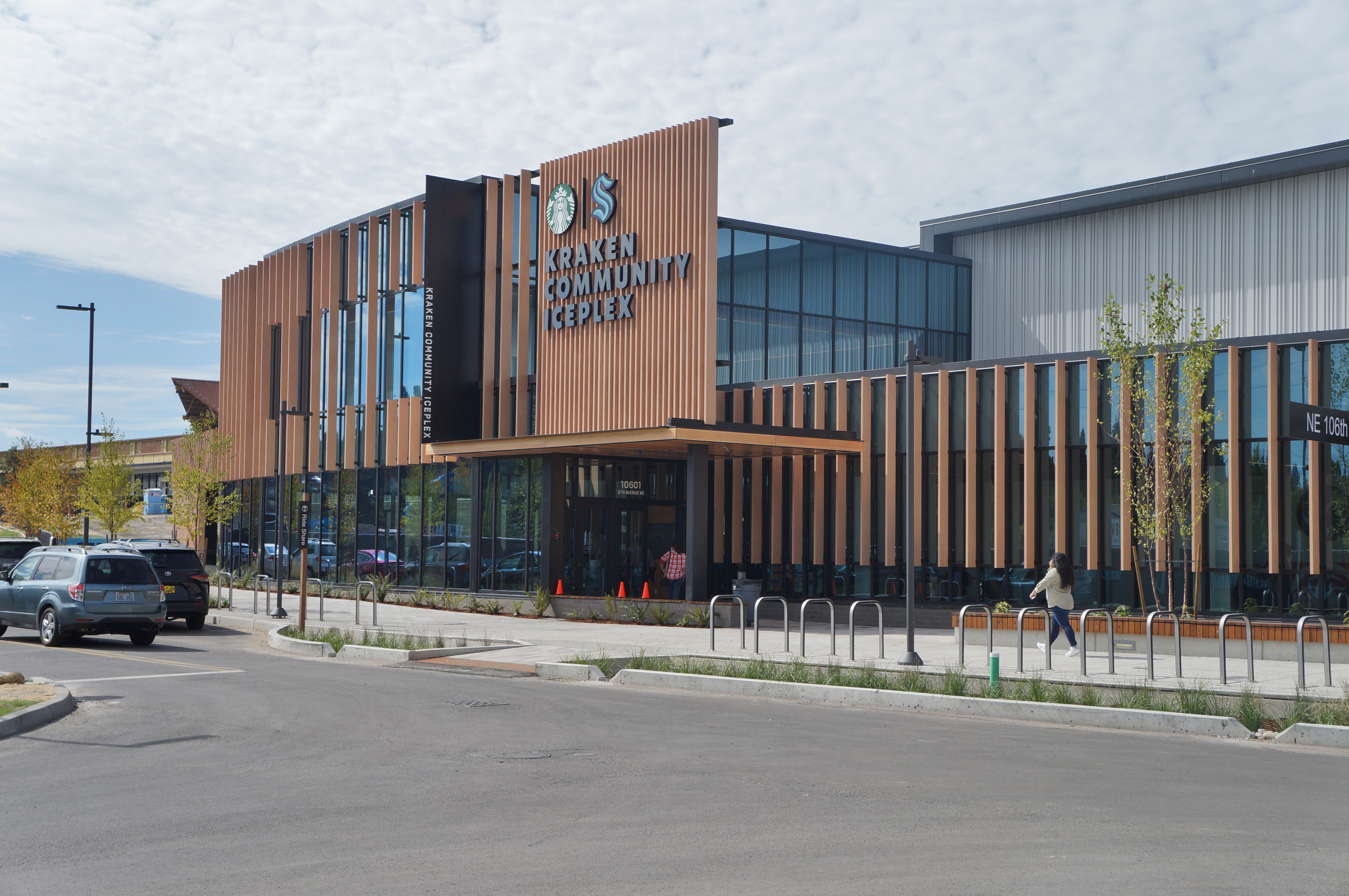
Kraken Community Iceplex

In 2018, Simon Property Group announced their intention to redevelop the 55-acre (22 ha) mall into a mixed-use center with hotels, housing, offices and the headquarters and practice facility for the Seattle Kraken National Hockey League franchise, in addition to retail space. The redevelopment will replace several parking lots adjacent to a nearby light rail station. Construction on the hockey facility, named the Kraken Community Iceplex, began in February 2020 and was completed and opened in September 2021. The $80 million facility has 1,000 seats around its main rink and 400 seats at two other rinks primarily for community use. It also has a restaurant and a health clinic.

Two hotels are planned to be developed at Northgate, both operated by Marriott International; the first, the 167-room Residence Inn by Marriott Seattle Northgate Station, opened in May 2025 on the west side of the property. Construction of the first residential buildings at Northgate Station began in July 2024. A seven-story apartment building with 234 units opened in August 2026 adjacent to the Iceplex. The mall was renamed from Northgate Station to The District at Northgate by Simon Property Group in September.

== Location ==
The mall is bounded on the north by NE Northgate Way (formerly NE 110th Street), on the west by 1st Avenue NE, on the south by NE 103rd Street, and on the east by 5th Avenue NE. The Northgate informal district and Northgate Way were both named after the mall. The original mall has itself become the anchor for development of surrounding apartment buildings, retail and light commercial blocks and community spaces, all now part of a more comprehensive plan for growth such as the opportunities and impacts of transit facilities and the light rail station for the district.

== Anchor stores ==
=== Current ===
- Barnes & Noble: since fall 2007
- Nordstrom Rack: since 2012
- Kraken Community Iceplex: since Sept. 10, 2021

=== Former ===
- DSW: since 2008, opened as Lamonts in 1977, renamed Gottschalks in 2000, closed in 2021
- Nordstrom: since 1950, closed in August 2019 and was demolished in 2021
- JCPenney: since 1950, closed in May 2019 and was demolished in 2022-23
- Toys R Us: since 1997, closed in 2012 and became Nordstrom Rack
- Macy's: since 2005: opened as The Bon-Marche, renamed Bon-Macy's in 2003, then converted into Macy's in 2005, closed in July 2019 and was demolished in September 2019
- Bed Bath & Beyond since 2008, opened as Lamonts in 1977, renamed Gottschalks in 2000, closed in 2023 due to bankruptcy and liquidation

== Criminal incidents ==
In 1973, the serial-killer Ted Bundy reportedly apprehended a purse-snatcher late at night in the Northgate Mall parking lot, a few weeks before his first documented murder. Many of his subsequent victims were approached in parking lots.

On September 12, 1983, Tracy Ann Winston was abducted from Northgate Mall and murdered by Gary Ridgway, the Green River Killer.

The following year, on April 23, 1984, a seven-man force of The Order attacked an armored car at the mall, after first staging a diversionary bombing.

== Bibliography ==
- "About the Seattle City Clerk's On-line Information Services". Information Services. Seattle City Clerk's Office. April 30, 2006.
  See heading, "Note about limitations of these data".
- Crowley, Walt (March 19, 2001). "Blue Streak, first express park-and-ride bus service, begins between Northgate and downtown Seattle on September 8, 1970". HistoryLink.org Essay 3115.
  Crowley referenced Walt Crowley, Routes, An Interpretive History of Public Transportation in Metropolitan Seattle (Seattle: Metro Transit, 1993).
- "Group Health Cooperative dedicates Northgate Clinic on March 22, 1958". HistoryLink.org Essay 7421. August 13, 2005.
- Langston, Jennifer (June 8, 2006). "Northgate project, creek to spring up". Business. Seattle Post-Intelligencer. pp. E1, E2.
- "Maple Leaf". Seattle City Clerk's Neighborhood Map Atlas. Office of the Seattle City Clerk. June 17, 2002.
  Maps "NN-1030S", "NN-1040S".jpg dated June 17, 2002.
- "Northgate". Seattle City Clerk's Neighborhood Map Atlas. Office of the Seattle City Clerk. June 17, 2002.
- "Northgate Directory". Home > Mall Directory > Browse Alphabetically. Simon Properties. 2006.
- "Northgate Information". Simon Properties. 2006.
- "Northgate Mall" (GIF). Home > Mall Directory > View Mall Floorplan. Simon Properties. October 15, 2003.
- "Northgate Revitalization: Building Northgate". Seattle Department of Planning and Development. May 10, 2006.
- "Northgate Revitalization: Overview". Seattle Department of Planning and Development. January 3, 2005.
- "Northgate Revitalization: Northgate Public Process History". Seattle Department of Planning and Development. August 12, 2004.
- Phelps, Myra L. (1978). Public works in Seattle. Seattle: Seattle Engineering Department. ISBN 0-9601928-1-6.
- Shenk, Carol; Pollack, Laurie; Dornfeld, Ernie; Frantilla, Anne; Neman, Chris (June 26, 2002). "About neighborhood maps". Seattle City Clerk's Office Neighborhood Map Atlas. Information Services, Seattle City Clerk's Office.
  Sources for this atlas and the neighborhood names used in it include a 1980 neighborhood map produced by the Department of Community Development (relocated to the Department of Neighborhoods and other agencies), Seattle Public Library indexes, a 1984-1986 Neighborhood Profiles feature series in the Seattle Post-Intelligencer, numerous parks, land use and transportation planning studies, and records in the Seattle Municipal Archives.
  [Maps "NN-1120S", "NN-1130S", "NN-1140S".Jpg [sic] dated June 13, 2002; "NN-1030S", "NN-1040S".jpg dated June 17, 2002.]"Northgate Shopping Mall opens on April 21, 1950". HistoryLink.org Essay 3186.
  Wilma referenced Walt Crowley with Paul Dorpat (Photography Editor), National Trust Guide: Seattle (New York: John Wiley & Son, Inc., 1998), 209;
  HistoryLink.org Online Encyclopedia of Washington State History, "Northgate Beginnings" (by Jim Douglas), The Free Online Encyclopedia of Washington State History - HistoryLink.org (accessed August 2001);
  L. B. Fussell, "Section To Be Known As 'Northgate'", The Seattle Times, February 22, 1948;
  "Features Of Northgate Shopping Area Outlined", The Seattle Times, February 1, 1950; "Polar Bear Cubs And $35,000 Car Vie At Northgate", The Seattle Times, May 23, 1950;
  "Plenty of Parking Space At Northgate", The Seattle Times, May 7, 1950;
  "Carter To Carve Totem Pole For Northgate", The Seattle Times, February 26, 1952;
  "Northgate Stores Fete Completion Of 5-Acre Area", The Seattle Times, February 15, 1952;
  "Car Show Planned On Northgate Mall", The Seattle Times, April 30, 1953;
  "25 New Stores Opening At Northgate", The Seattle Times, August 17, 1965;
  "Did You Know?" The Seattle Times, March 18, 1965;
  "Northgate's Vast Parking Areas Can Accommodate Up To 50,000 Cars A Day", The Seattle Times, March 21, 1968;
  "Eighteen Stores Pioneered Merchandising History At Northgate", The Seattle Times, April 9, 1975;
  "Northgate An Instant Success", The Seattle Times, April 9, 1975;
  "Northgate Center Will Celebrate 30th Anniversary Next Month", The Seattle Times, March 13, 1980;
  "Simoninfo", Simon Properties Website (www.simon.com);
  Steve Schoenherr (University of San Diego), "Evolution of the Shopping Center", Steve Schoenherr Home Page accessed on November 4, 2004 (http://home.sandiego.edu/~ses/).
- Wilma, David (July 20, 2001). "Seattle Neighborhoods: Maple Leaf -- Thumbnail History". HistoryLink.org Essay 3454.
  From Mimi Sheridan and Carol Tobin, Licton Springs History,(Seattle: Licton Springs Community Council, 2001), 8;
  Don Sherwood, "Sacajawea P.F.", in "Interpretive Essays of the Histories of Seattle's Parks and Playfields", handwritten bound manuscript dated 1977, Seattle Room, Seattle Public Library.
