= Northgate, Seattle =

- Seattle Neighborhood
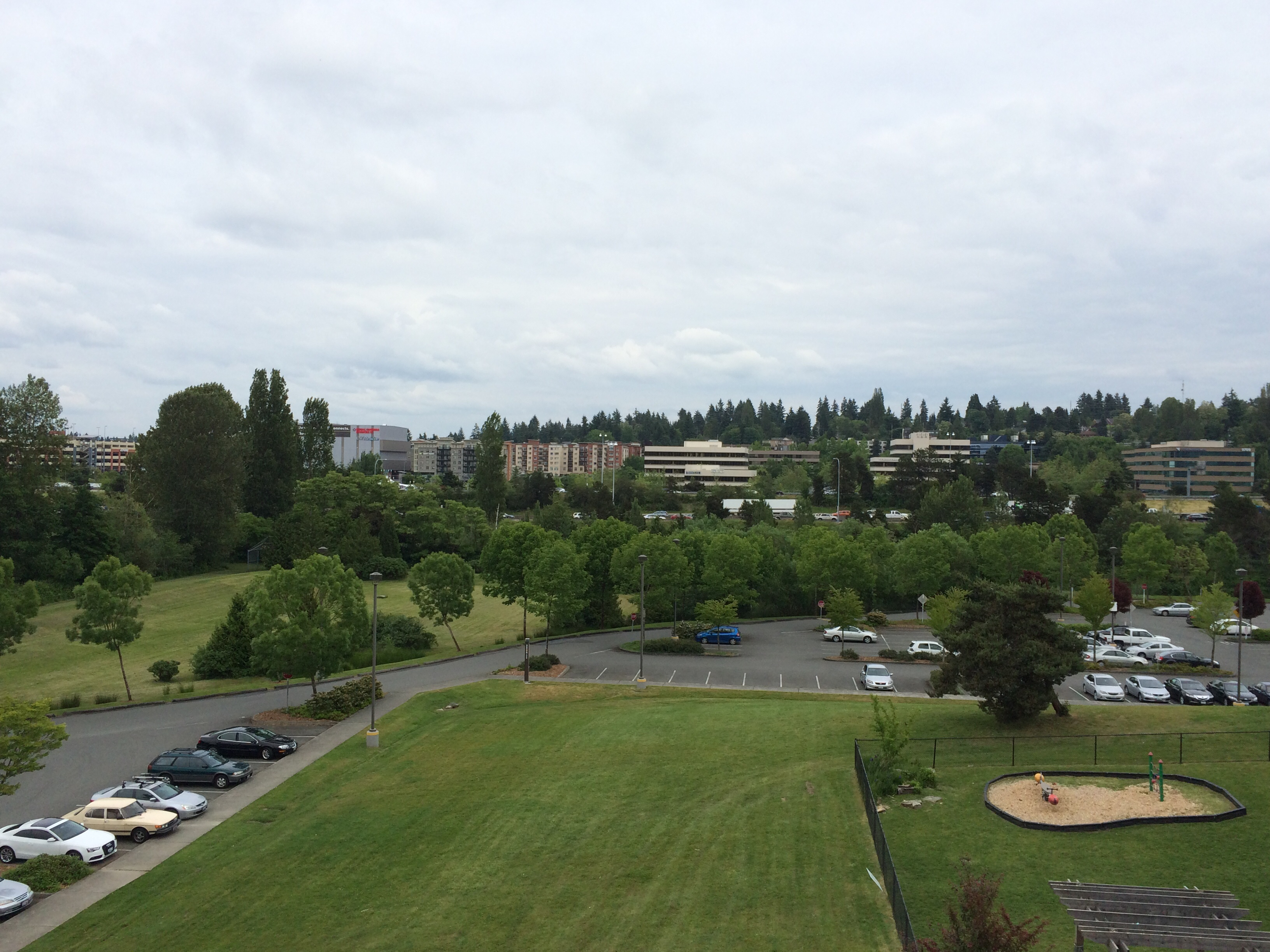
- The skyline of central Northgate from North Seattle College

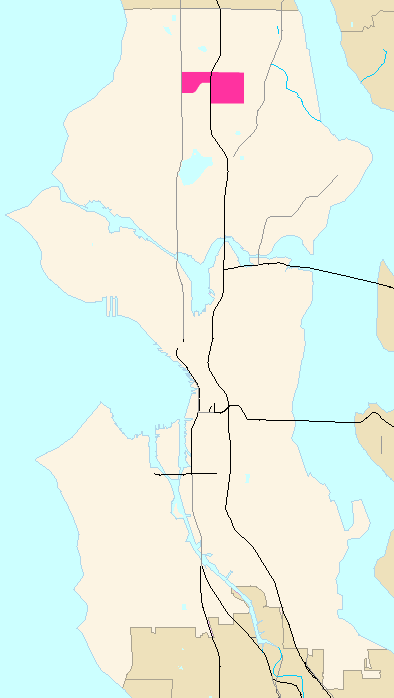
- Northgate highlighted in Pink
- Coordinates: 47°42′30″N 122°19′42″W
- Country: United States
- State: Washington
- County: King
- City: Seattle
- ZIP Code: 98125
- Area Code: 206, 564

Northgate is a neighborhood in north Seattle, Washington, named for and surrounding Northgate Mall, the first covered mall in the United States. Its north-south principal arterials are Roosevelt Way NE and Aurora Avenue N (SR 99), and its east-west principal arterials are NE Northgate Way and 130th Street. Minor arterials are College Way-Meridian Avenue N, 1st, 5th, and 15th avenues NE. Interstate 5 runs through the district. Besides the eponymous mall, the most characteristic distinctions of the area are North Seattle College (NSC) and the south fork of the Thornton Creek watershed and Seattle Kraken Iceplex center.

== History ==
=== Prehistory ===
What is now Northgate has been inhabited since the end of the last glacial period (c. 8,000 BCE—10,000 years ago). The Dkh^{w}’Duw’Absh, People of the Inside and Xacuabš, People of the Large Lake, Lushootseed (Skagit-Nisqually) Coast Salish native people had used the Liq'tid Springs area as a spiritual health spa. They harvested cranberries from the Slo’q `qed (SLOQ-qed, bald head), an 85 acre (34 ha) marsh and bog at what is now the NSCC car park, Interstate 5 interchange, and Northgate Mall. Large open areas for game habitat and foraging (anthropogenic grasslands) were maintained in what are now these neighborhoods by selective burning every few years. Today the Native American descendants are represented by the Duwamish tribe.

=== Development ===
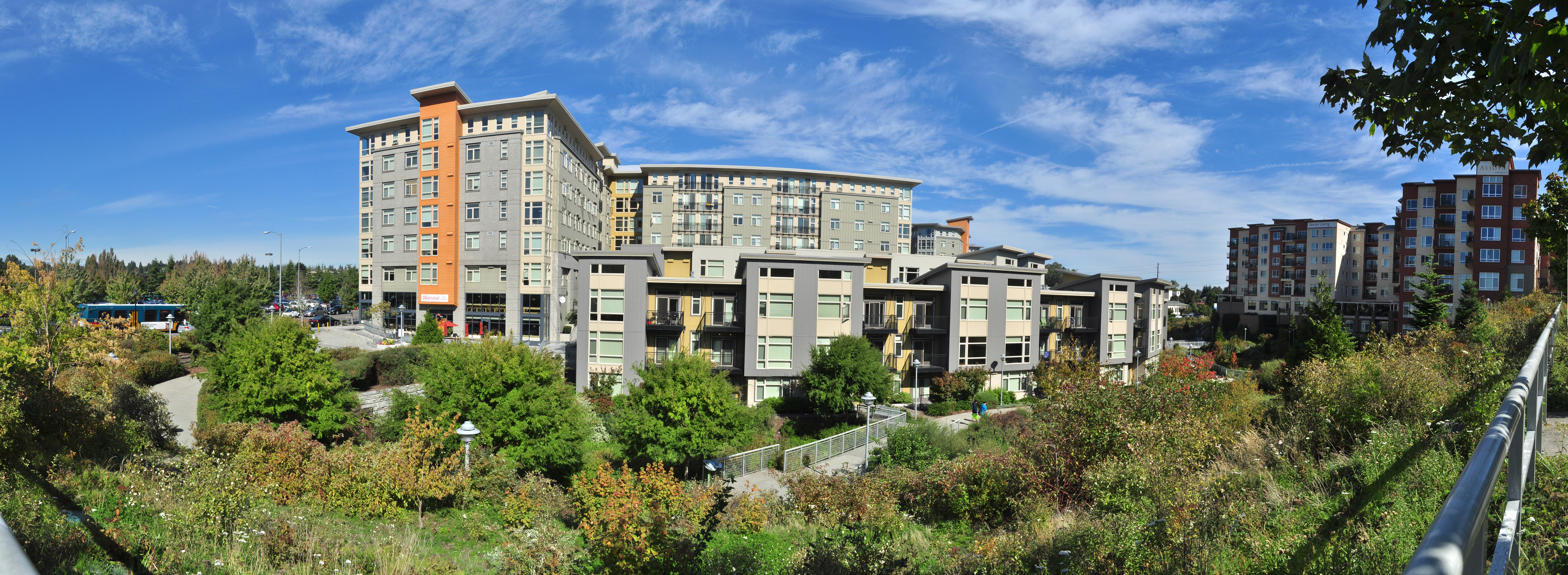
The residential part of the Thornton Place complex, immediately south of Northgate Mall.

The Northgate area has been subject to a large amount of residential and commercial development in the last few years, and many huge projects are underway. The height limits in the area have been increased to 85' to allow for further population growth.

In 2009 the Northgate Mall was remodeled and added dozens more retail shops. In 2006, a new park, library, and community center opened in the Northgate neighborhood across 5th Ave NE from Northgate Mall. These are part of the city's plan to accelerate development in Northgate.

While there is much commerce in the area, hotel development has been limited with only the Hotel Nexus, previously a Ramada Inn, being the only upscale hotel in the area. The many motels lining Aurora Avenue are further northwest than the Northgate neighborhood.

Dense mixed-use development is expected to be constructed adjacent to Northgate station on Link light rail, which opened in October 2021 as the terminus of the Northgate Link Extension. Northgate is also home to the headquarters and team practice facility of the Seattle Kraken which began play in October 2021.

== Neighborhoods ==
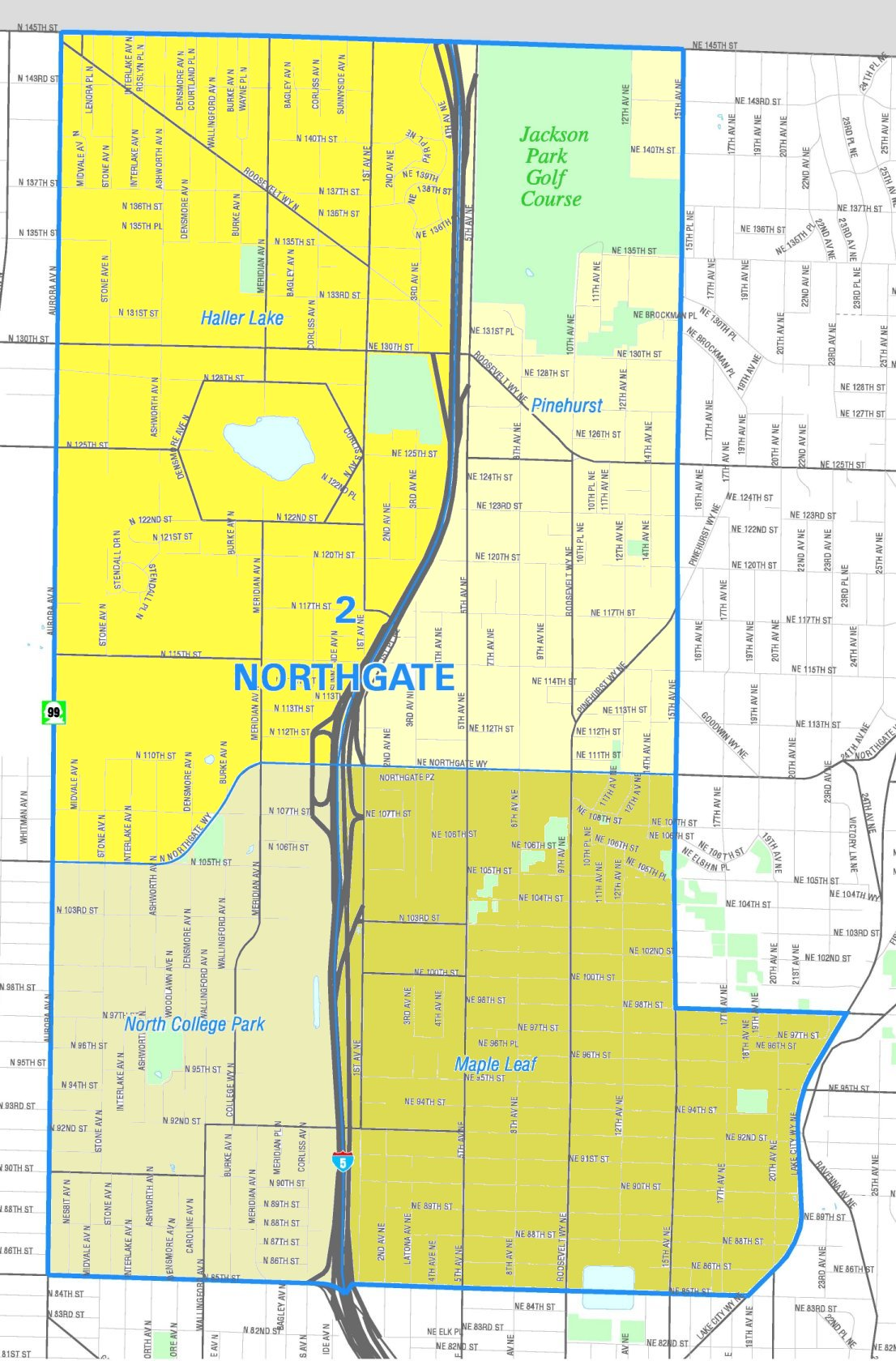
Northgate, from the Seattle City Clerk's Office Neighborhood Atlas

Northgate neighborhoods are (north to south):

- Haller Lake
- Pinehurst
- Licton Springs or North College Park
- Maple Leaf

== Places of Interest ==
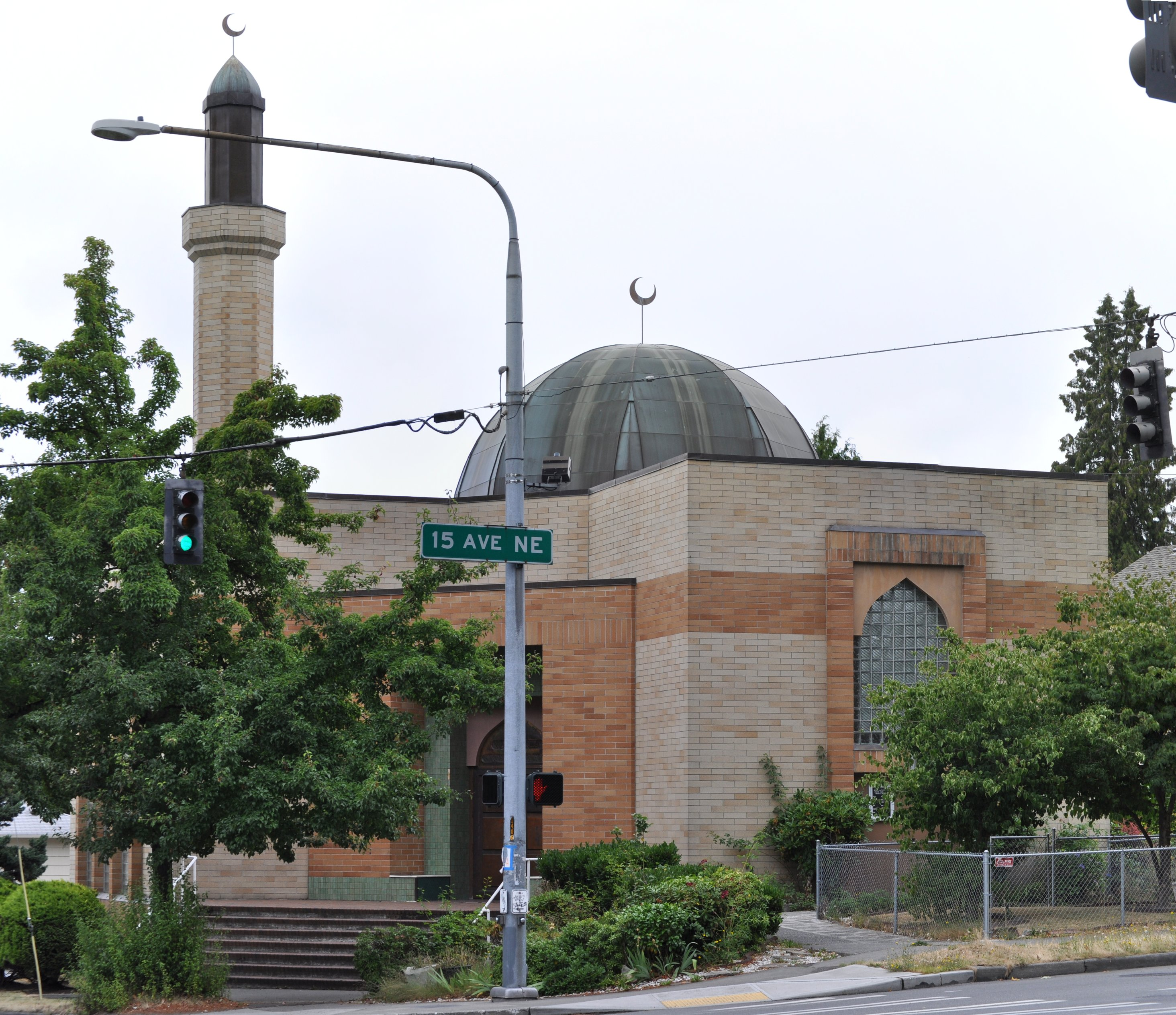
Sheikh Abdul Kadir Idriss Mosque

The Idriss Mosque in Pinehurst has architecture unique to Seattle. An octagonal dome and a symbolic minaret, both sheathed in copper and capped with crescent moons, red brick walls banded with buff brick and tall glass-block windows topped with concrete lintels in the shape of Moorish arches distinguish the first mosque in Seattle (1981) and the first mosque west of the Mississippi River to be built in a Middle Eastern design.

== Mall ==
The north entrance of the Northgate Mall before removal of the totem pole

The Northgate neighborhood is home to The District at Northgate, a shopping mall and mixed-use area on 55 acres (22 ha) adjacent to Interstate 5. It opened in 1950 and is the oldest shopping center in the Pacific Northwest to be called a "mall"; three other shopping centers in the United States predate its use of the term. The mall opened outside of Seattle's city limits but was later annexed and became part of the Maple Leaf neighborhood of Northgate.

Surrounding Northgate Mall are many strip malls and the "Northgate North" shopping center which features a Best Buy and a two-story Target.
