= Shoreline North/185th station =

Link light rail station in Shoreline, Washington, U.S.

42 Shoreline North/185th
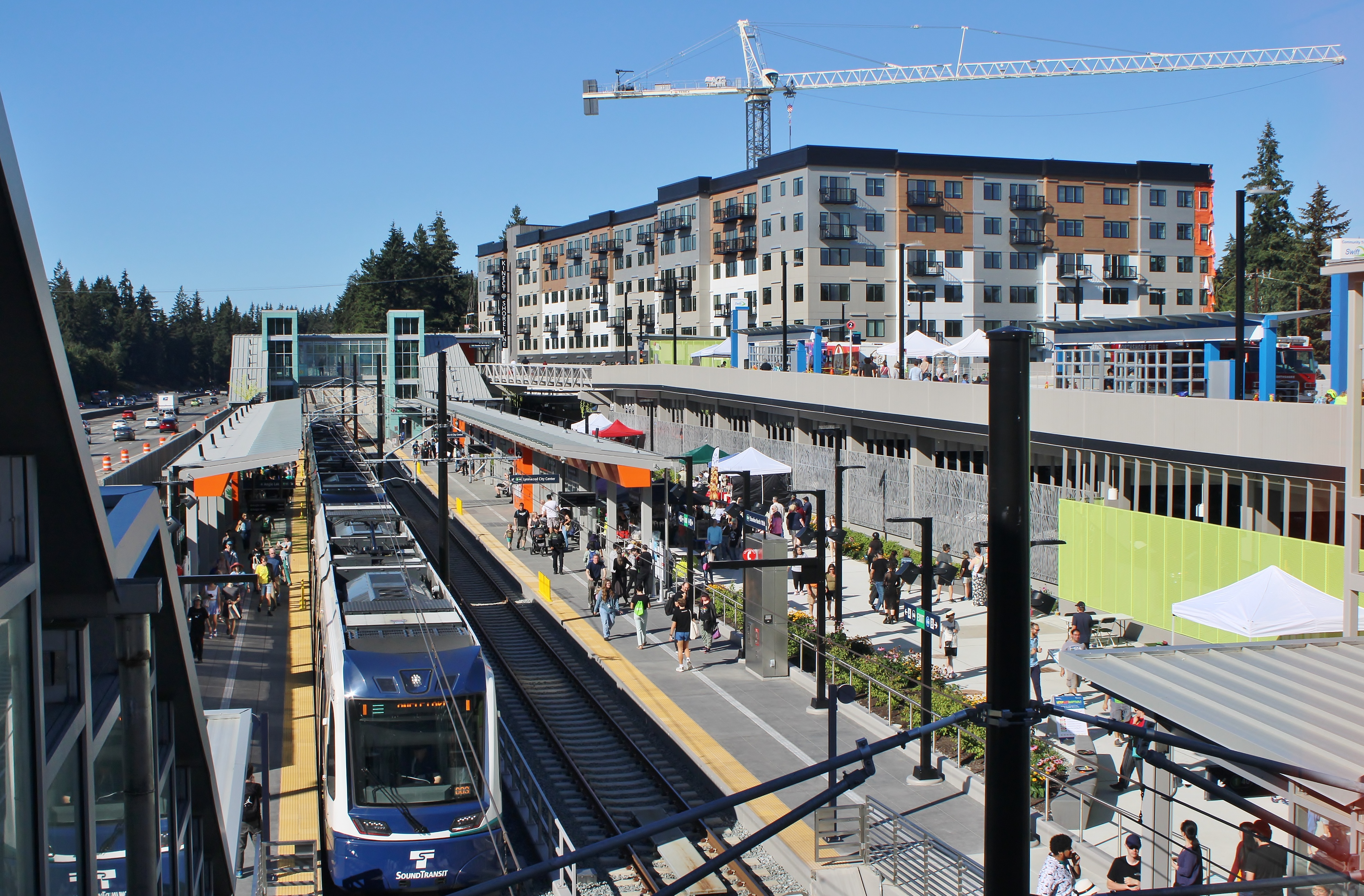
- Platform view from the south entrance on opening day

General information
- Location: 710 Northeast 185th Street; Shoreline, Washington, U.S.
- Coordinates: 47°45′51″N 122°19′22″W
- System: Link light rail
- Operator: Sound Transit
- Line: Lynnwood Link Extension
- Platforms: 2 side platforms
- Tracks: 2
- Train operators: Sound Transit
- Bus routes: 3
- Bus stands: 4
- Bus operators: King County Metro; Community Transit (Swift)

Construction
- Structure type: At-grade
- Parking: 360 spaces
- Cycle facilities: Lockers and racks
- Accessible: Yes

History
- Opened: August 30, 2024

Passengers
- 1,311 daily weekday boardings (2025); 429,974 total boardings (2025)

Services
Preceding station	Sound Transit	Following station
Link
Mountlake Terrace toward Lynnwood City Center	1 Line	Shoreline South/148th toward Federal Way Downtown
Mountlake Terrace toward Lynnwood City Center	2 Line	Shoreline South/148th toward Downtown Redmond
Location

Shoreline North/185th station is a Link light rail station in Shoreline, Washington, United States. It is served by the 1 Line and 2 Line, both operated by Sound Transit. The station is located in a trench on the east side of Interstate 5, on the north side of Northeast 185th Street. It includes an adjacent bus station and two-story parking garage with 360 stalls. The station opened on August 30, 2024, with the rest of the line. Shoreline North/185th station also serves as the terminus of the Swift Blue Line.

== History ==
The Shoreline area developed as a suburban bedroom community in the early 20th century, centering around the Seattle–Everett Interurban Railway and later State Highway 99 on Aurora Avenue. The area east of Aurora Avenue had one major commercial center, North City, which developed in the 1940s along 15th Avenue Northeast. Interstate 5 was constructed through the area between Aurora and North City in the early 1960s, roughly along 5th Avenue Northeast. In 1957, the Seattle Transit Commission proposed using the freeway's right of way for a rapid rail transit system, including a stop at "Richmond" near NE 185th Street. The proposal was rejected by the state government over financing concerns, as federal and state highway funds could not be used for the necessary property acquisition.

Planning for a modern light rail system was delegated to the Transit Commission's successor, Metro Transit, in the 1970s. Although the Interstate 5 corridor was left out of the Forward Thrust proposals, put to two votes in 1968 and 1970 that ultimately failed, it was reconsidered in a 1986 proposal by Metro and the Puget Sound Council of Governments, which placed a station serving North City at NE 185th Street. The proposal was never formally adopted, but was the basis for later proposals by the Regional Transit Agency, which later became Sound Transit. In 1995, the RTA proposed the construction of a regional light rail system, including a line from Seattle to Lynnwood that stopped at 175th Street NE in Shoreline north of the Seattle city limits. The plan was rejected by voters and re-sized into a successful 1996 ballot measure, which only constructed light rail from the University of Washington campus in Seattle to Seattle–Tacoma International Airport south of the city.

Light rail service began on August 30, 2024. The bus station opened on September 14 as part of a regional network restructure. The 2 Line entered simulated service on February 14, 2026, with passengers able to board trains from Lynnwood to International District/Chinatown station.

=== Public involvement in planning ===
A community group recognized by Shoreline, called 185th Station-Area Citizens Committee (185SCC) was formed in 2012. The formal planning process in Shoreline started in May 2013.

Public involvement has not always been orderly. At a March 2015 public forum in Shoreline on rezoning, the city's mayor threatened to have rowdy, shouting participants ejected by police.

== Station layout ==
Shoreline North/185th station consists of two side platforms situated below street level in a trench. The station has two sets of stairs, escalators and elevators leading to enclosed surface entrances with ticket vending machines and rider information. To the immediate east of the station is a bus station with multiple bays, as well as a kiss and ride facility, atop a 360-stall parking garage. The parking garage was originally planned to be on the west side of the freeway, connected by an enlarged overpass, but was consolidated to save costs.

== Services ==
In addition to Link light rail service, Shoreline North/185th station is the southern terminus of Community Transit's Swift Blue Line, a bus rapid transit service on the State Route 99 corridor in Snohomish County. The Blue Line was extended to the station on September 14, 2024, and connects it to Lynnwood and Everett. The station has four bus bays: two for the Swift Blue Line and two for local King County Metro routes. These local routes travel to Richmond Beach, North City, and Northgate.
