= Swift Blue Line =

Bus rapid transit route in Snohomish County, Washington

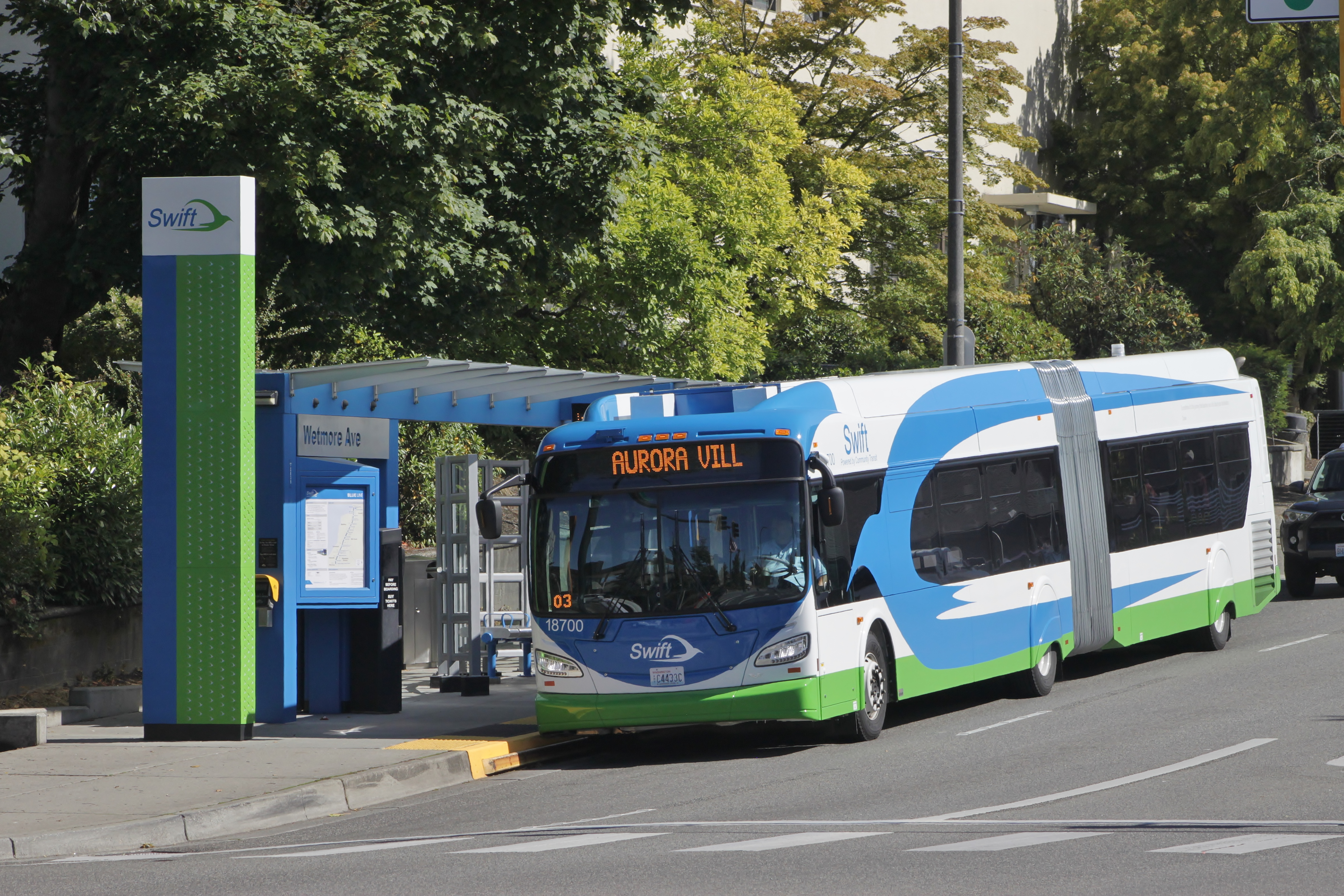
- A Blue Line bus in Everett

Overview
- System: Swift
- Operator: Community Transit
- Garage: Merrill Creek Base
- Vehicle: New Flyer XDE60
- Status: Operating
- Began service: November 29, 2009
- Predecessors: Community Transit routes 100 and 101

Route
- Route type: Bus rapid transit
- Locale: Snohomish County
- Communities served: Everett, Lynnwood, Edmonds, Shoreline
- Start: Everett Station
- Via: Evergreen Way, State Route 99
- End: Shoreline North/185th Station
- Length: 16.7 miles (26.9 km)
- Stations: 36
- Other routes: Everett Transit routes 7 and 8, Community Transit route 101

Service
- Frequency: 10 minutes
- Weekend frequency: 15–20 minutes
- Journey time: 64 minutes
- Operates: 4:15 am – 11:00 pm
- Annual patronage: 1,621,838 (2015)
- Transfers: Swift Green Line at Airport Road; Swift Orange Line at 196th Street Southwest; RapidRide E Line at Aurora Village; Link 1 Line and 2 Line at Shoreline North/185th station
- Timetable: Swift Blue Line schedule

The Swift Blue Line is a bus rapid transit route operated by Community Transit in Snohomish County, Washington, as part of the Swift system. The Blue Line is 16.7 miles (26.9 km) long and runs on the State Route 99 and Evergreen Way corridor between Everett Station and Shoreline North/185th station. It has 36 stations in the cities of Everett, Lynnwood, Edmonds, and Shoreline.

The Blue Line has the highest ridership of any Community Transit route, carrying over 1.6 million total passengers in 2015. It also has the highest frequency out of all Community Transit routes, running at headways of 10 to 15 minutes on weekdays from 4:00 a.m. to 7:00 p.m. and mid-day on weekends, and 20-minute headways during early mornings and late nights.

The line opened with 28 stations on November 29, 2009 as "Swift", becoming the first bus rapid transit system in the state of Washington and costing $29 million to construct. Four infill stations in Everett were opened in 2011, and a southbound infill station serving Edmonds College opened in 2016. It gained the "Blue Line" moniker in August 2016, with the announcement of a second line, the Green Line, that opened in March 2019. The Blue Line was extended south from Aurora Village to Shoreline North/185th station in September 2024 following the opening of the Lynnwood Link light rail project.

== Route ==
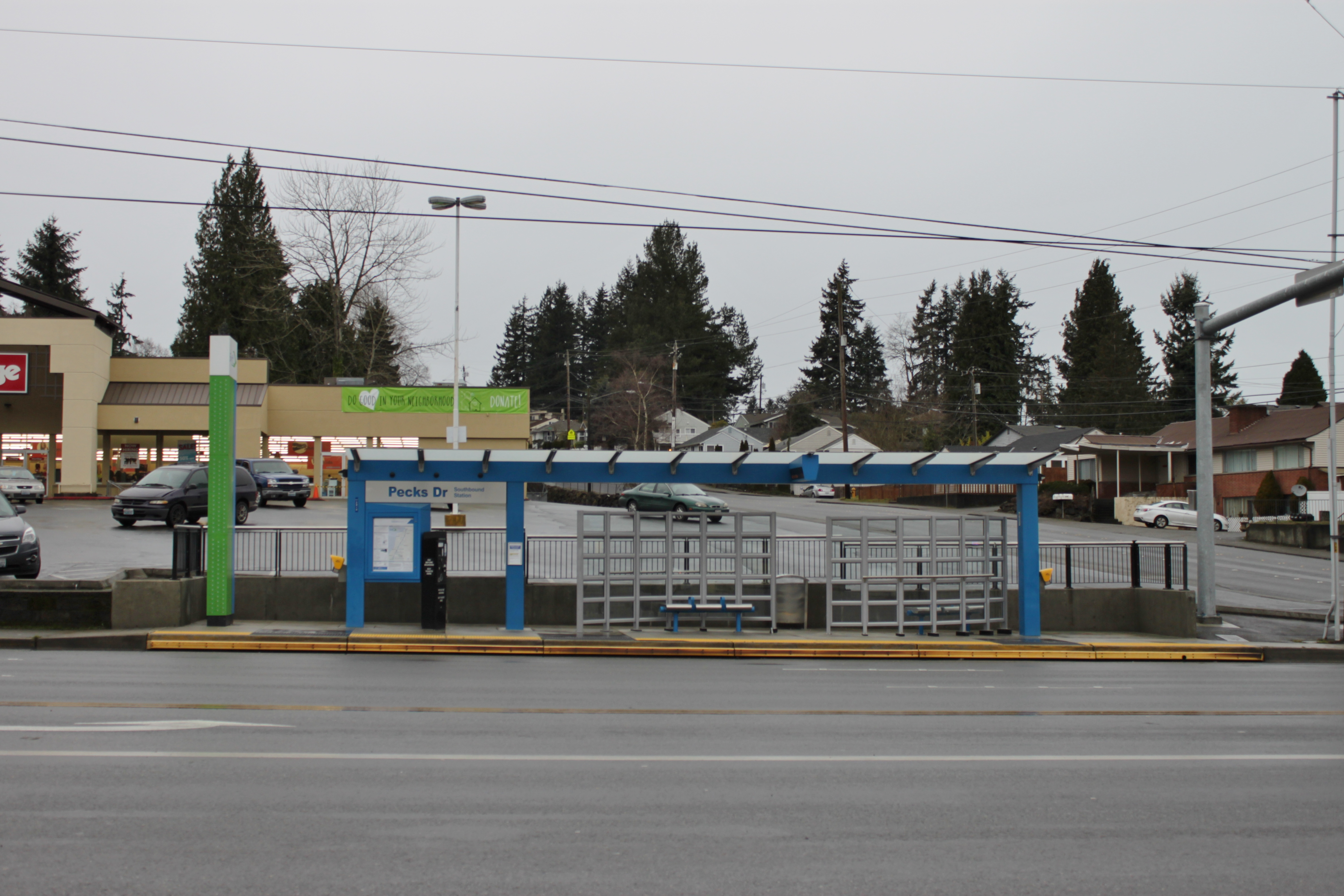
The southbound platform at Pecks Drive Station along Evergreen Way in Everett

The Blue Line, designated internally as Community Transit Route 701, begins at Bays G and H at the south end of Everett Station. Buses travel north on Smith Avenue, passing the station building and parking lots, and turn west onto Pacific Avenue towards Downtown Everett. The line continues west on Pacific, stopping at a station split between Wetmore and Colby avenues near the Snohomish County Government Campus, before turning south onto Rucker Avenue. The next station pair, split between 40th and 41st streets, serves The Everett Clinic and the Everett Memorial Stadium complex, as well as the northern terminus of the Interurban Trail. Buses travel south in general purpose lanes on Evergreen Way, passing over State Route 526 north of Casino Road Station. The road continues southwest as State Route 99 into the unincorporated community of Lake Stickney, where the Blue Line stops at Airport Road Station, a transfer with the Green Line to the Boeing Everett Factory and Mill Creek, and Lincoln Way Station north of an interchange with State Route 525. The line enters the city of Lynnwood and moves into business access and transit (BAT) lanes at 148th Street Station, where a queue jump signal for northbound buses was installed in 2012. The Blue Line continues south on State Route 99 through Lynnwood, serving the Lynnwood Crossroads area at 196th and 200th streets and the Edmonds College with a southbound-only stop at 204th Street, and continues into Edmonds to stop at the Edmonds Swedish Medical Center. The line crosses over State Route 104 and enters the city of Shoreline in King County, before it turns east onto North 200th Street and reaches its southern terminus at Aurora Village Transit Center Bay 9.

== Stations ==
The Blue Line serves 34 stations, grouped into 16 pairs spaced approximately one mile (1.6 km) apart from each other, on its 16.7-mile-long (27 km) route. Swift stations consist of a 40-foot-long (12 m), 10-foot-wide (3.0 m) covered shelter on a 60-to-70-foot-long (18 to 21 m), 10-inch-high (25 cm) platform that allows for level boarding onto buses. The platform and shelter also include a roadside beacon that is lit at night, graffiti-resistant weather barriers, two Parkeon ticket vending machines, two ORCA card readers, and a next bus arrival sign. Buses stop at all stations, are allowed a dwell time of 10 seconds, and use curb bumpers to guide them closer to the platform.

Transfers from the Blue Line to other bus routes are possible at every station, served by shadow service running on the State Route 99 and Evergreen Way corridor between Blue Line stations and frequently-spaced stops. Community Transit route 101 runs from Aurora Village Transit Center to the Everett city limits at Airport Road Station, and Everett Transit routes 7 and 8 run on the Swift corridor within Everett. There are several intersecting routes that connect Blue Line to Sound Transit Express service on Interstate 5 in Lynnwood: three routes on 200th Street near Crossroads and Heron stations travel east to Lynnwood Transit Center; and two routes on 148th Street travel to Ash Way Park and Ride. At Aurora Village Transit Center, the Blue Line provides a connection to the RapidRide E Line, a bus rapid transit route on Aurora Avenue that runs through Shoreline to Downtown Seattle. The Blue Line's terminals also provide a connection to regional services that run south to Seattle: Everett Station has Sounder commuter rail and Sound Transit Express bus routes to Seattle, and Shoreline North/185th Station is a station on the 1 Line.

=== List of stations ===
Station	ID	Location	City	Connections	Opened	References
Everett Station	2837, 2838	3201 Smith Avenue	Everett	Amtrak, Sounder commuter rail, ST Express, Community Transit, Everett Transit	November 29, 2009	
Colby Avenue/Wetmore Avenue	2835, 2836	Pacific Avenue & Colby/Wetmore avenues	Everett	Community Transit, Everett Transit	November 29, 2009	
40th Street/41st Street	2819, 2820	Evergreen Way & 40th/41st streets	Everett	Everett Transit	November 29, 2009	
50th Street	2815, 2816	Evergreen Way & 50th Street	Everett	Everett Transit route 7	November 29, 2009	
Madison Street/Pecks Drive	2807, 2810	Evergreen Way & Madison Street/Pecks Drive	Everett	Everett Transit	December 21, 2010 (northbound); January 25, 2011 (southbound)	
Casino Road	2795, 2796	Evergreen Way & Casino Road	Everett	Everett Transit	November 29, 2009	
4th Avenue	2787, 2788	Evergreen Way & 4th Avenue	Everett	Everett Transit	November 29, 2009	
112th Street	2783, 2784	State Route 99 & 112th Street	Everett	Everett Transit	January 4, 2011 (northbound); January 25, 2011 (southbound)	
Airport Road	2781, 2782	State Route 99 & Airport Road	Everett	Swift Green Line; Community Transit, Everett Transit	November 29, 2009	
Lincoln Way	2779, 2780	State Route 99 & Lincoln Way	Lynnwood	Community Transit	November 29, 2009	
148th Street	2777, 2778	State Route 99 & 148th Street	Lynnwood	Community Transit	November 29, 2009	
International/Cherry Hill	2767, 2770	State Route 99 & 174th/176th streets	Lynnwood	Community Transit	November 29, 2009	
Heron (Note: Heron Station (200th Street) is a northbound-only station with no matching southbound station.)	2761	State Route 99 & 200th Street	Lynnwood	Community Transit	November 29, 2009	
Crossroads/196th Street	2764, 3247	State Route 99 & 196th Street	Lynnwood	Swift Orange Line; Community Transit	November 29, 2009 (southbound); August 21, 2023 (northbound)	
College (Note: College Station (204th Street) is a southbound-only station with no matching northbound station.)	2760	State Route 99 & 204th Street	Lynnwood	Community Transit	February 3, 2016	
Gateway/216th Street	2753, 2754	State Route 99 & 216th Street	Edmonds	Community Transit	November 29, 2009	
238th Street	2747, 2748	State Route 99 & 238th Street	Edmonds	Community Transit	November 29, 2009	
Aurora Village Transit Center	2742, 3313	1524 N 200th Street	Shoreline	RapidRide E Line, Community Transit, King County Metro	November 29, 2009	
Shoreline North/185th Station	3267, 3382	710 NE 185th Street	Shoreline	1 Line, King County Metro	September 14, 2024	
Timepoint or terminus

== Service ==
Swift frequency
Type	Frequency	Span of service	
Type	Frequency	Days	Times
Mornings	15 minutes	Monday–Friday	4 a.m. – 6 am
Weekdays	10 minutes	Monday–Friday	6 a.m. – 7 p.m.
Evenings	20 minutes	Monday–Friday	7 p.m. – 11 p.m.
Saturday	15 minutes	Saturday	6 a.m. – 7 p.m.
Saturday evenings	20 minutes	Saturday	7 p.m. – 10 p.m.
Sunday mornings	20 minutes	Sunday	7 a.m. – 11 am
Sunday	15 minutes	Sunday	11 a.m. – 5 p.m.
Sunday evenings	20 minutes	Sunday	5 p.m. – 9 p.m.

The Blue Line runs at a headway of 10 minutes from 6 a.m. to 7 p.m. on weekdays, its highest level of service with five buses per hour per direction. Weekday service begins with a headway of 15 minutes during the early mornings and ends with 20-minute frequencies from 7 p.m. to 11 p.m. On Saturdays, buses run every 15 minutes from 6 a.m. to 7 p.m. and every 20 minutes from 7 p.m. to 10 p.m. Blue Line buses run every 20 minutes during the morning and evening hours on Sundays and every 15 minutes during the midday hours between 11 a.m. and 5 p.m.

Swift initially ran at a 10-minute headway, and had evening service end at midnight, until a major system-wide service reduction in February 2012 reduced its weekday headway to 12 minutes. Sunday service was suspended entirely from 2010 until 2015 due to budget cuts. The 10-minute weekday frequency was restored in September 2018, and Saturday frequency was bumped from 20 minutes to 15 minutes in September 2019. Service on the Blue Line was reduced to every 12 minutes on weekdays in March 2020 due to the COVID-19 pandemic. Fare collection was also suspended until June 1 to increase physical distancing between passengers, drivers, and fare ambassadors. Full service was restored in September 2020.

The Blue Line carried a total of 1,621,838 riders in 2015, making it the most popular route operated by Community Transit, and accounting for 16.2% of the agency's total ridership.

== History ==
=== Former services ===
Blue Line bus rapid transit service on the State Route 99 corridor was preceded by decades of transit services traveling through southwestern Snohomish County, which ranged from an interurban railway to local buses. The Seattle–Everett Interurban Railway ran interurban service from 1910 to 1939 along the Pacific Highway, later U.S. Route 99 and State Route 99. During its heyday, the interurban ran at 30-minute headways throughout the day, and only made automatic stops at its terminals in Everett and Seattle. The railway was dismantled and later used as right of way for overhead power lines, until it was converted into a rail trail in the 1990s and 2000s, named the Interurban Trail.

Community Transit was founded in 1976 as the public transit agency for Snohomish County, and introduced local service from Everett to Aurora Village via State Route 99 on route 750. By 1991, the State Route 99 corridor had the highest ridership on both Community Transit and Everett Transit. Route 750 was later renumbered to route 610, which was later upgraded to 15-minute headways in the 1990s, and itself split into two routes, 100 and 101, in 2003. Community Transit route 100 ran during peak hours along the full length of the corridor from Aurora Village to Everett, while route 101 only ran the southern portion of the route to South Everett, with all-day service that required a transfer to Everett Transit to complete trips to downtown Everett.

=== BAT lanes and BRT studies ===
Planning for limited-stop bus service, which later evolved into bus rapid transit, began in the 1990s, with proposals to build bus lanes on State Route 99 between 145th Street NE in Shoreline and Casino Road (near State Route 526) in Everett. Sound Transit was established in 1996 as a regional transit authority, and selected the State Route 99 corridor as a route for its express bus system, but later replaced it, before service began, with an express route on Interstate 5 from Everett to Northgate, while leaving SR 99 to Community Transit. Sound Transit funded the construction of business access and transit lanes on State Route 99 through Lynnwood from 244th Street to 148th Street in 2002, converting former parking lanes, and widening the highway in some areas, improving existing bus service, and laying the ground for a future bus rapid transit line.

Community Transit's Strategic Planning Group published a recommendation in 2004, calling for bus rapid transit service on the State Route 99 corridor between Everett Station and Aurora Village Transit Center, featuring off-board fare collection, limited stops, and transit signal priority. The route alternatives proposed included express service from Aurora Village to Downtown Seattle via Aurora Avenue North or Interstate 5, as well as express service on Interstate 5 in Everett, if a partnership to share costs with Everett Transit for the Evergreen Way segment was not viable. In December 2005, the CT Board of Directors approved an accelerated planning schedule for a bus rapid transit project, to cost an estimated $15–20 million, and to begin service as the first such system in the Puget Sound region in 2008.

=== Planning, design and construction ===
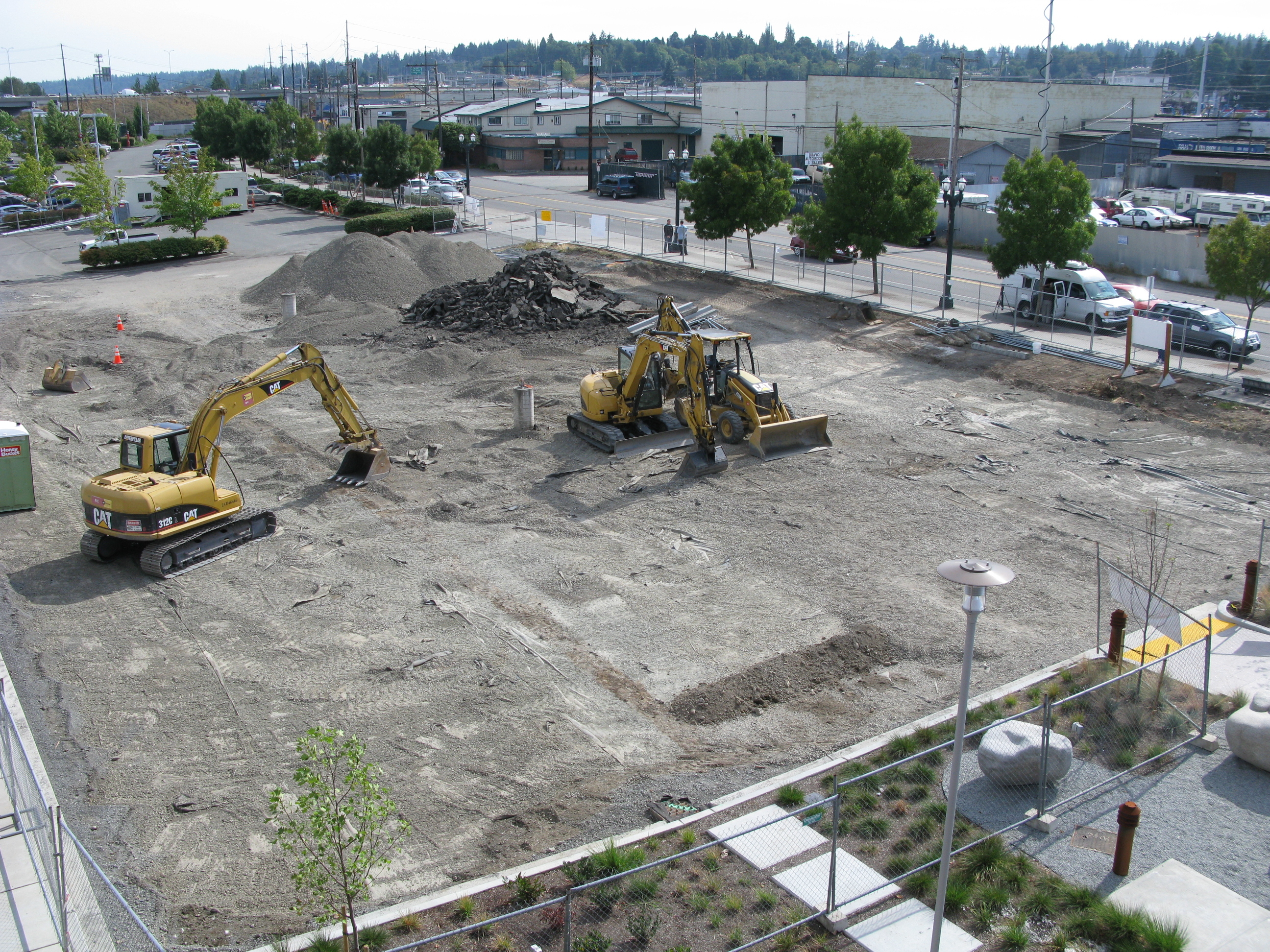
August 2009

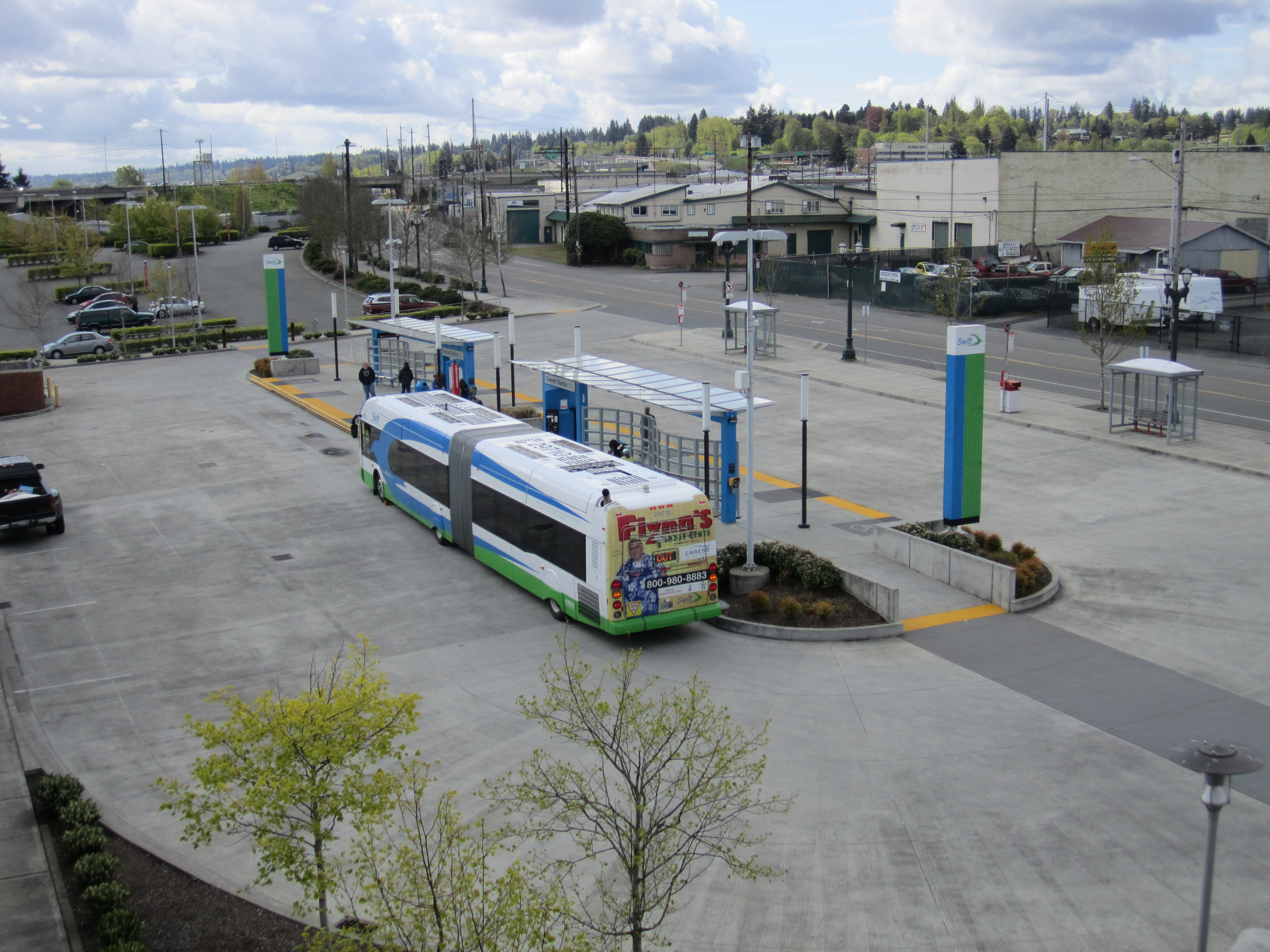
April 2014

The Swift terminal at Everett Station before and after completion

Community Transit unveiled detailed plans for its bus rapid transit system, including the "Swift" name and logo, on July 26, 2006. The first line, located on State Route 99 between Everett and Aurora Village, would begin operating in 2008, with 10-minute headways and limited stops. The agency envisioned real-time arrival signs at stations, and transit signal priority, among other improvements over existing bus service.

The following year, CT purchased its fleet of 15 hybrid diesel-electric buses from New Flyer, at a cost of $879,028 per vehicle, to be paid for with state and federal subsidies.

Community Transit signed an agreement on December 5, 2007 with Everett Transit, which allowed for Swift to operate within Everett city limits with sales tax revenue from Everett funding stations, and transit signal priority within Everett. In exchange, Everett Transit would be allowed to expand its services into neighboring unincorporated areas that do not have CT service.

A groundbreaking ceremony for the first Swift station, located at Airport Road in south Everett, was held on December 3, 2008, and was attended by Community Transit CEO Joyce Eleanor, U.S. Senator Patty Murray, and the mayors of Everett and Marysville. Stations were constructed in two phases: the first consisting of utility relocation and pouring of the concrete shelter pad; the second being the installation of the shelters, beacons, and other amenities beginning in June 2009. The first station to be completed, a training facility at the Merrill Creek bus base, was opened during a media event on May 5, 2009; in September 2009, the first station on the line was completed at 196th Street in Lynnwood.

The project cost a total of $29 million (equivalent to $43.5 million in 2025), of which $15 million was paid for by grants from the Federal Transit Administration, Washington State Department of Transportation, as well as the partnership with Everett Transit. The grants also paid for the majority of the cost to operate Swift for its first three years of service, estimated at $5 million annually, allowing it to maintain 10-minute headways, while the rest of Community Transit service was reduced in 2010.

=== Launch and additional stations ===
Swift launched on November 29, 2009 with a ribbon-cutting ceremony at Crossroads Station, and a day of free rides from 4:00 p.m. to midnight. The following day marked the beginning of regular service, with the first runs departing their termini at 5:00 am, and the new service attracted more than 1,500 riders, with end-to-end trips taking 20 minutes less compared to local buses on the same corridor. Swift debuted as the first bus rapid transit line in the state of Washington, ahead of King County's RapidRide, opening a year later in 2010, and one of the longest lines in the country when it opened.

Existing local service on the State Route 99 was reduced on November 29 to accommodate the introduction of Swift. Community Transit eliminated route 100, a peak only service on the corridor, and reduced weekday headways on route 101 from 15 minutes to 20 minutes. Everett Transit reduced weekday headways on route 9, running from Airport Road Station to the Everett Community College, from 20 minutes to 30 minutes.

The successful launch of Swift, which saw ridership grow to 3,000 daily boardings in its first five months of service, earned Community Transit a Vision 2040 Award from the Puget Sound Regional Council in May 2010. The agency also received two bronze Summit Creative Awards for the launch of Swift, as well as instructional videos on riding Swift that were published on YouTube.

Four infill stations located in Everett were added to Swift in December 2010 and January 2011: a split pair at Madison Street and Pecks Drive, filling a nearly 2-mile-long (3.2 km) gap between Casino Road and 50th Street, and a pair at 112th Street. The stations were paid for by $1.6 million in regional mobility grants from the Washington State Department of Transportation to Everett Transit, awarded in May 2009. An additional southbound Swift station, College Station at 204th Street SW in Lynnwood, was opened on February 3, 2016. It has no matching northbound station and serves Edmonds College. It was originally proposed with the rest of the Lynnwood stations, but was delayed while waiting for the City of Lynnwood to extend 204th Street and build a traffic signal at its intersection with State Route 99. A northbound station at 196th Street opened in August 2023 as part of preparations for the future Orange Line, which has a transfer at the intersection. It is the first station to use an updated Swift design with longer windscreens, improved station signage and digital kiosks, and a new roof.

=== Later developments ===
Swift stations were given a number of small improvements after the line opened. Curb bumpers were installed in June 2010 to help guide buses closer to the raised platform, and reduce the gap at the door. In 2012, a queue jump signal was installed northbound at the north end of the BAT lanes at 148th Street, allow Swift buses to merge into traffic. Real-time arrival signs debuted at Swift stations in 2013, featuring a countdown to the arrival of the next bus that is estimated using GPS units on coaches. In June 2015, the Washington State Department of Transportation removed part of the refuge island at the intersection of State Route 99 and Airport Road to create a through lane exclusively for Swift buses.

Bus service on Aurora Avenue North, the continuation of State Route 99 in Shoreline and Seattle, was upgraded to bus rapid transit with the introduction of the RapidRide E Line in February 2014. The line terminates at Aurora Village Transit Center, allowing for transfers to Swift. On August 12, 2016, Community Transit announced a rebrand for Swift to the "Swift Blue Line", while the planned Swift II line would become the Green Line. The Green Line opened on March 24, 2019, and connects with the Blue Line at Airport Road Station.

The Blue Line was extended through Shoreline to connect with Link light rail at Shoreline North/185th station on September 14, 2024. The extension opened two weeks after the station did as part of the Lynnwood Link Extension. Community Transit selected the Meridian Avenue corridor for the extension in June 2020 to prioritize connections at the existing transit center over two other options on Aurora Avenue.

== See also ==
- List of bus rapid transit systems in North America
- RapidRide
