= Swift Bus Rapid Transit =

Bus rapid transit service in Snohomish County, Washington

Swift

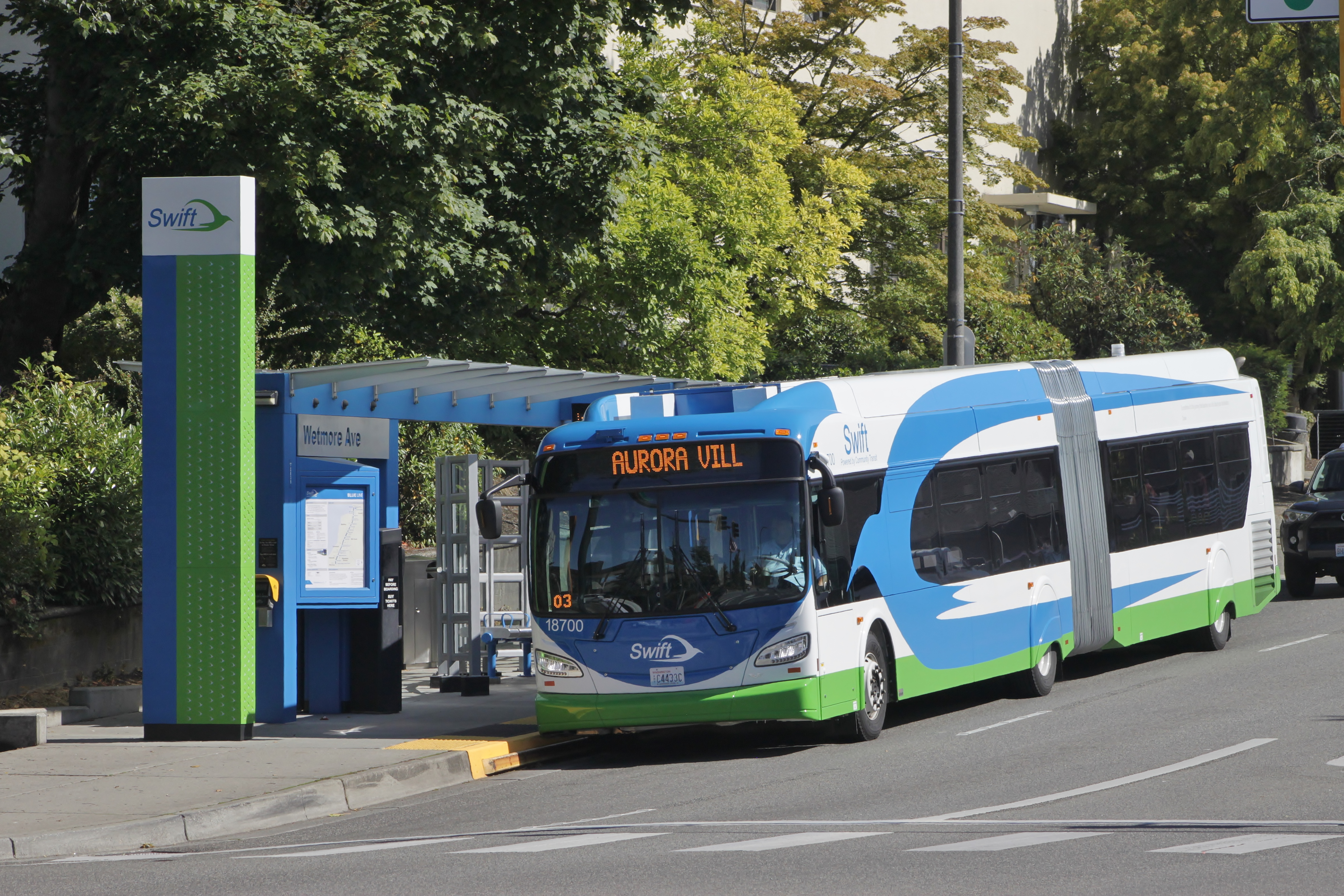
- A southbound Blue Line bus at Wetmore Avenue Station in downtown Everett

Overview
- Locale: Snohomish County, Washington, U.S.
- Transit type: Bus rapid transit
- Number of lines: 3
- Number of stations: 90
- Annual ridership: 4.3 million (2025)
- Website: communitytransit.org/swift

Operation
- Began operation: November 29, 2009
- Operator: Community Transit
- Number of vehicles: 54 articulated buses
- Headway: 10–20 minutes

Technical
- System length: 40.5 mi (65.2 km)

Swift Bus Rapid Transit (stylized Swift, in italics) is a bus rapid transit system operated by Community Transit in Snohomish County, Washington, part of the Seattle metropolitan area. Swift consists of three routes that total over 40 miles (64 km) in length and cover urban portions of the county. The Blue Line, opened in 2009, runs on the State Route 99 corridor between Everett and Shoreline. The Green Line opened in 2019 and runs from the Boeing Everett Factory to Mill Creek and Bothell via State Route 527. It was followed by the Orange Line, which connects Lynnwood to Mill Creek, in 2024. The lines intersect at several points and also have stations that serve other transit systems, such as Link light rail and Sounder commuter rail.

Swift has the highest ridership of any Community Transit service, at 4.3 million in 2025. The service also has the highest frequency out of all Community Transit routes, ranging from 10 minutes on weekdays from 6:00 a.m. to 7:00 p.m., to 20 minutes during early mornings, late nights, and weekends. The network's stations and vehicles are accessible, featuring improved boarding for wheelchair users, and have designated bicycle parking inside buses.

The first 28 Swift stations were opened on November 29, 2009, at a cost of $29 million. Four infill stations in Everett were opened in 2011, and a southbound infill station serving Edmonds College opened in 2016. The original line, known only as "Swift", became the "Blue Line" in August 2016. The Green Line opened in March 2019 and was followed by the Orange Line in 2024. Long-range plans adopted by Community Transit include Swift trunk lines replacing its most popular corridors by 2030, feeding into future Link light rai; stations at Lynnwood City Center station and Everett Station.

== Lines ==
Swift has three lines that serve southwestern Snohomish County and part of King County.

Swift BRT lines
Line Name	Opened	Stations	Distance		Termini	
Line Name	Opened	Stations	mi	km	Western/Southern	Eastern/Northern
Blue Line	November 29, 2009	36 (Note: 18 station pairs)	16.7	26.9	Shoreline North/185th station	Everett Station
Green Line	March 24, 2019	35 (Note: 17 station pairs and 1 northbound station)	12.5	20.1	Canyon Park Park and Ride	Seaway Transit Center
Orange Line	March 30, 2024	26 (Note: 12 station pairs, 1 northbound station, and 1 southbound station)	11.3	18.2	Edmonds College	McCollum Park

Future Swift BRT lines
Line Name	Planned opening	Stations	Distance		Termini				
Line Name	Planned opening	Stations	Gold Line	2031	TBA	13.8	22.2	Everett Station	Smokey Point Transit Center
Silver Line	2037	TBA	—	—	Seaway Transit Center	Cathcart			

== Service ==
Swift frequency
Type	Frequency	Span of service	
Type	Frequency	Days	Times
Mornings	15 minutes	Monday–Friday	4:15 a.m. – 6:00 am
Weekdays	10 minutes	Monday–Friday	6:00 a.m. – 7:00 pm
Evenings	20 minutes	Monday–Friday	7:00 p.m. – 11:00 pm
Saturday (Blue only)	15 minutes	Saturday	6:00 a.m. – 7:00 pm
Saturday evenings (Blue only)	20 minutes	Saturday	7:00 p.m. – 10:00 pm
Saturday (Green only)	20 minutes	Saturday	6:00 a.m. – 10:00 pm
Sunday	20 minutes	Sunday	7:00 a.m. – 9:00 pm

Swift's three lines run at a headway of 10 minutes from 6:00 a.m. to 7:00 pm on weekdays, its highest level of service with five buses per hour per direction. Weekday service begins with a headway of 20 minutes from 4:00 a.m. to 6:00 am, and ends with the same frequency during the evening from 7:00 p.m. to 10:00 pm. During Saturdays, buses run every 15–20 minutes from 6:00 a.m. to 10:00 pm. Sunday service, which was suspended from 2010 until 2015, runs from 7:00 a.m. to 9:00 pm every 20 minutes. The Blue Line initially ran at a 10-minute headway, and had evening service end at midnight, until a major system-wide service reduction in February 2012 reduced its weekday headway to 12 minutes. Its 10-minute service was restored in September 2018 as part of the launch of the Green Line, while a later expansion in September 2019 brought 15-minute service on Saturdays to the Blue Line.

Swift carried a total of 4.3 million riders in 2025, making up 45 percent of all service operated by Community Transit. The Blue Line had the heaviest ridership in 2024, with 2.1 million total boardings.

=== Fares and enforcement ===
Swift BRT fares
Type	Fare
Adult	$2.50
Youth	Free
Reduced	$1.00
As of March 2025

Fares on Swift are equivalent to Community Transit's local service fares, divided into two groups: adult fares of $2.50 for passengers between the ages of 18 and 65; and a reduced fare of $1.00 charged for passengers over the age of 65, those with disabilities, Medicare card holders, and those enrolled in the ORCA Lift low-income fare program. Since 2022, fares have not been charged for youth passengers under the age of 19 as part of a statewide program. At the time of Swift's launch in 2009, adult fares were set at $1.50, but have been increased since then.

Swift uses off-board payment at its stations, made possible by the placement of two ORCA card readers and two ticket vending machines at each shelter. The ticket vending machines only accept $1 bills (without giving change) and credit cards from Visa and MasterCard, printing out a paper ticket. The system uses proof-of-payment to verify fares, enforced by "Swift Ambassadors", who conduct random fare inspections and can issue a $124 citation to riders who fail to pay. The ambassadors are also joined by members of the Snohomish County Sheriff's Office, who are also able to conduct fare inspections.

== Fleet ==
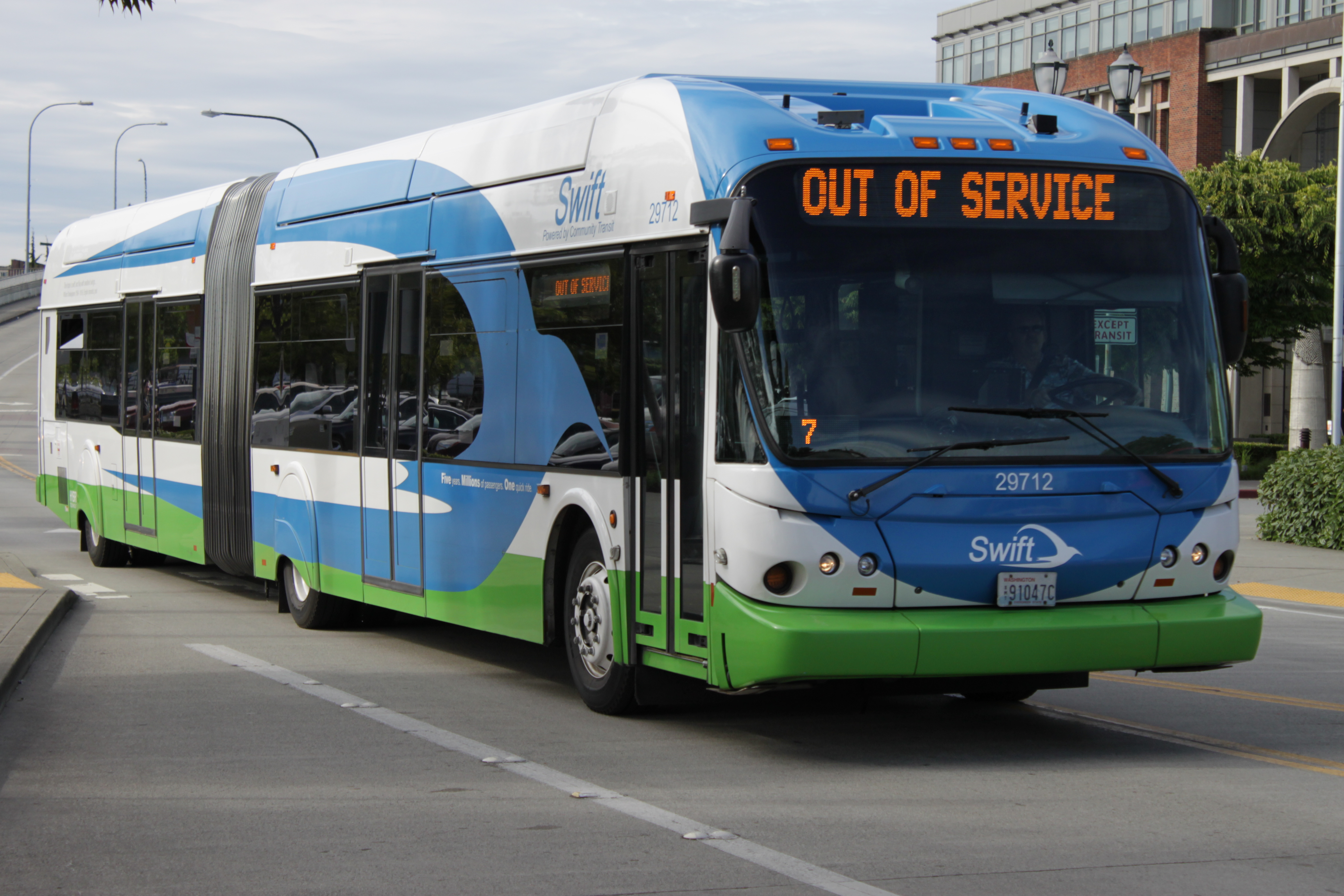
A Swift bus deadheading to Everett Station to begin its route

Swift uses a fleet of specially-branded New Flyer articulated buses. The first 15 buses, of the New Flyer DE60LFA line, are hybrids, while the second fleet, consisting of 18 New Flyer Xcelsior buses, is diesel-only. A third fleet of 15 hybrid electric New Flyer Xcelsior buses was ordered for the Orange Line launch in 2024. The buses measure 60 to 62 feet (18 to 19 m) long and typically carry 43 seated passengers and up to 80 standing passengers. They have three doors that allow for all-door boarding at stations, the rear two of which are sliding plug doors; the front door has a wheelchair ramp, and is located closest to the two wheelchair bays secured by a passive restraint system, which doesn't require assistance from the driver. A three-space bicycle rack is located inside the bus across from the rear door. The coaches deadhead to and from their overnight storage space at the Merrill Creek bus base in Everett, where a mock station used for driver training was unveiled in May 2009.

The first fleet of Swift buses were ordered in 2007 with the option of purchasing 34 additional coaches. The second fleet, originally consisting of 18 articulated buses, was purchased in 2016. The buses were delivered in 2018 and began service later that year on the Blue Line, featuring in-seat USB ports in addition to other features retained from the first fleet. Upgraded on-board digital signs with rider information began their rollout to Swift buses in 2024.

== History ==
Community Transit's planning for limited-stop bus service, which later evolved into bus rapid transit, began in the 1990s, with proposals to build bus lanes on State Route 99 between 145th Street NE in Shoreline and Casino Road (near State Route 526) in Everett. Sound Transit was established in 1996 as a regional transit authority, and selected the State Route 99 corridor as a route for its express bus system, but later replaced it, before service began, with an express route on Interstate 5 from Everett to Northgate, while leaving SR 99 to Community Transit. Sound Transit funded the construction of business access and transit lanes on State Route 99 through Lynnwood from 244th Street to 148th Street in 2002, converting former parking lanes, and widening the highway in some areas, improving existing bus service, and laying the ground for a future bus rapid transit line.

Community Transit's Strategic Planning Group published a recommendation in 2004, calling for bus rapid transit service on the State Route 99 corridor between Everett Station and Aurora Village Transit Center, featuring off-board fare collection, limited stops, and transit signal priority. The route alternatives proposed included express service from Aurora Village to Downtown Seattle via Aurora Avenue North or Interstate 5, as well as express service on Interstate 5 in Everett, if a partnership to share costs with Everett Transit for the Evergreen Way segment was not viable. In December 2005, the CT Board of Directors approved an accelerated planning schedule for a bus rapid transit project, to cost an estimated $15–20 million, and to begin service as the first such system in the Puget Sound region in 2008.

=== Blue Line planning, design and construction ===
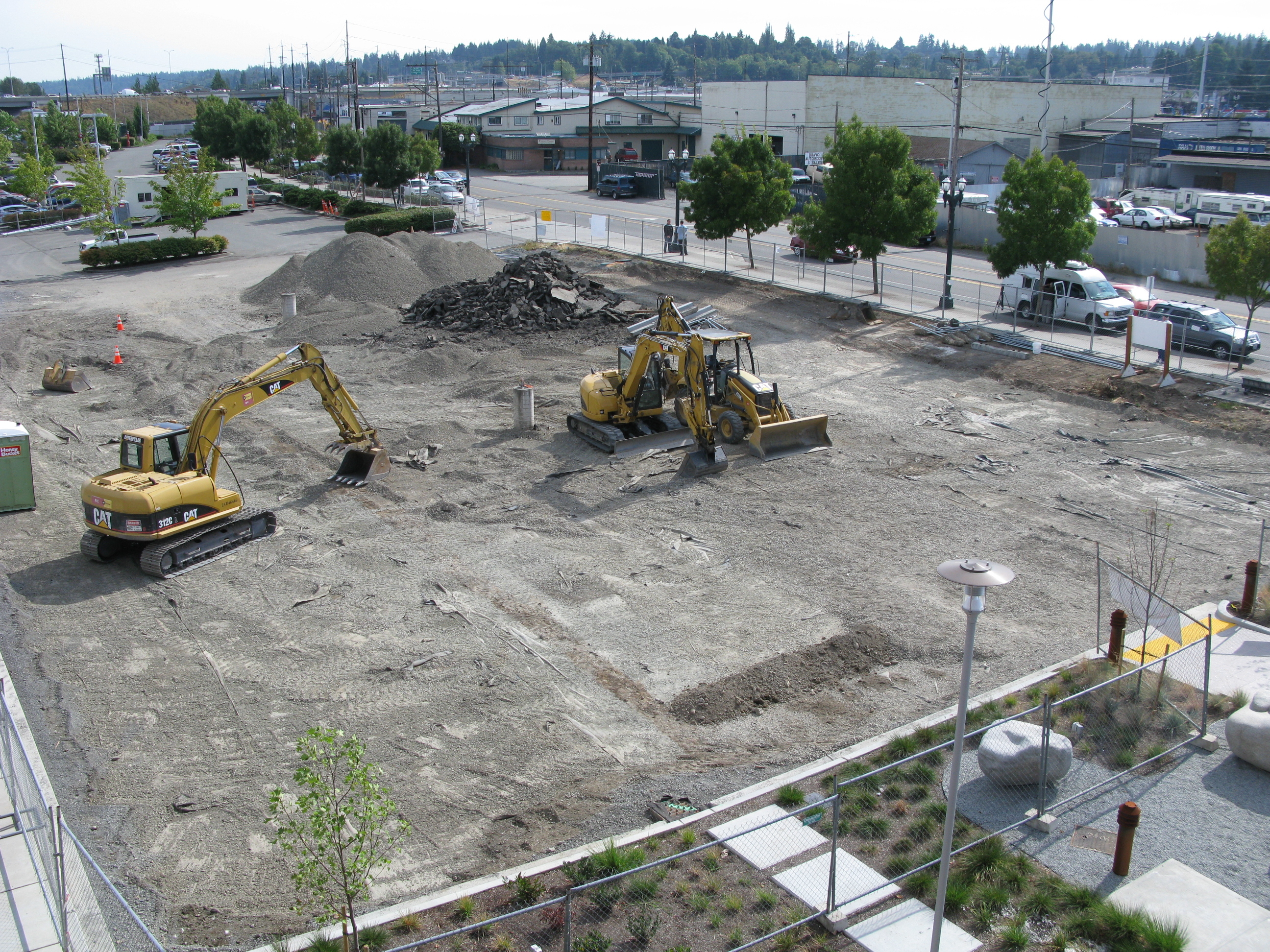
August 2009

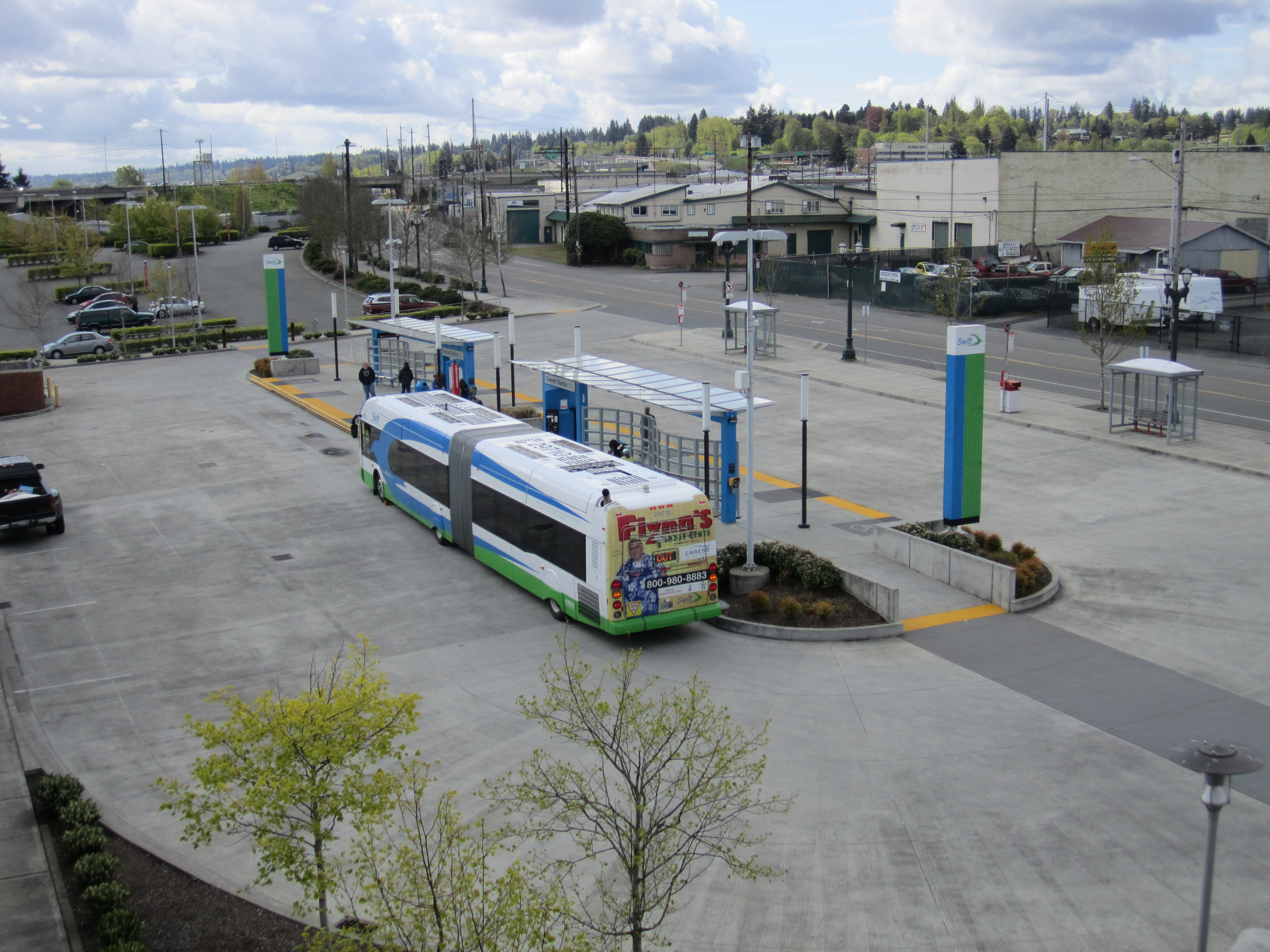
April 2014

The Swift terminal at Everett Station before and after completion

Community Transit unveiled detailed plans for its bus rapid transit system, including the "Swift" name and logo, on July 26, 2006. The first line, located on State Route 99 between Everett and Aurora Village, would begin operating in 2008, with 10-minute headways and limited stops. The agency envisioned real-time arrival signs at stations, and transit signal priority, among other improvements over existing bus service.

The following year, CT purchased its fleet of 15 hybrid diesel-electric buses from New Flyer, at a cost of $879,028 per vehicle, to be paid for with state and federal subsidies.

Community Transit signed an agreement on December 5, 2007 with Everett Transit, which allowed for Swift to operate within Everett city limits with sales tax revenue from Everett funding stations, and transit signal priority within Everett. In exchange, Everett Transit would be allowed to expand its services into neighboring unincorporated areas that do not have CT service.

A groundbreaking ceremony for the first Swift station, located at Airport Road in south Everett, was held on December 3, 2008, and was attended by Community Transit CEO Joyce Eleanor, U.S. Senator Patty Murray, and the mayors of Everett and Marysville. Stations were constructed in two phases: the first consisting of utility relocation and pouring of the concrete shelter pad; the second being the installation of the shelters, beacons, and other amenities beginning in June 2009. The first station to be completed, a training facility at the Merrill Creek bus base, was opened during a media event on May 5, 2009; in September 2009, the first station on the line was completed at 196th Street in Lynnwood.

The project cost a total of $29 million (equivalent to $43.5 million in 2025), of which $15 million was paid for by grants from the Federal Transit Administration, Washington State Department of Transportation, as well as the partnership with Everett Transit. The grants also paid for the majority of the cost to operate Swift for its first three years of service, estimated at $5 million annually, allowing it to maintain 10-minute headways, while the rest of Community Transit service was reduced in 2010.

=== Blue Line launch and later developments ===
Swift launched on November 29, 2009 with a ribbon-cutting ceremony at Crossroads Station, and a day of free rides from 4:00 p.m. to midnight. The following day marked the beginning of regular service, with the first runs departing their termini at 5:00 am, and the new service attracted more than 1,500 riders, with end-to-end trips taking 20 minutes less compared to local buses on the same corridor. Swift debuted as the first bus rapid transit line in the state of Washington, ahead of King County's RapidRide, opening a year later in 2010, and one of the longest lines in the country when it opened.

The successful launch of Swift, which saw ridership grow to 3,000 daily boardings in its first five months of service, earned Community Transit a Vision 2040 Award from the Puget Sound Regional Council in May 2010. The agency also received two bronze Summit Creative Awards for the launch of Swift, as well as instructional videos on riding Swift that were published on YouTube.

Swift stations were given a number of small improvements after the line opened. Curb bumpers were installed in June 2010 to help guide buses closer to the raised platform, and reduce the gap at the door. In 2012, a queue jump signal was installed northbound at the north end of the BAT lanes at 148th Street, allow Swift buses to merge into traffic. Real-time arrival signs debuted at Swift stations in 2013, featuring a countdown to the arrival of the next bus that is estimated using GPS units on coaches. In June 2015, the Washington State Department of Transportation removed part of the refuge island at the intersection of State Route 99 and Airport Road to create a through lane exclusively for Swift buses.

=== Green Line planning ===
In 2005, Community Transit approved a long range plan, which extended Swift into a full network, and which comprised the core of Community Transit service on "Transit Emphasis Corridors". The corridors identified served the cities of Everett, Lynnwood, Edmonds, Mill Creek, Bothell, Marysville, and Arlington, using existing arterial streets that already have bus service.

Community Transit announced plans for a second Swift line in November 2013. The 12.5-mile-long (20.1 km) line, tentatively named "Swift II", was created out of two Transit Emphasis Corridors, and would travel from the Boeing Everett Factory to Mill Creek via Airport Road and State Route 527. A study, prepared by Parsons Brinckerhoff, and partially funded by the state legislature in 2012, estimated that the project would cost $42–48 million to construct, and attract 3,300 riders when it opened. The Federal Transit Administration approved project development in December 2014, a prerequisite to federal grants for capital construction and vehicle acquisition. During the 2015 session of the Washington State Legislature, Community Transit was granted the authority to increase sales taxes to fund operation of Swift II, pending voter approval via a ballot measure; the Washington State Department of Transportation also gave $6.8 million in funding to build the line's northern terminus at Seaway Transit Center. The ballot measure was approved by voters in November 2015, allowing for construction to begin sooner.

The second line was renamed the Green Line in August 2016 and given a 2019 completion date. The Green Line opened on March 24, 2019, a few weeks after the Paine Field passenger terminal.

=== Network expansion ===
The Orange Line opened on March 30, 2024, and connects Edmonds College to Lynnwood and Mill Creek. It also serves Lynnwood City Center station, where it connects to the Link light rail system; Alderwood Mall; and the 164th Street corridor. Construction began in April 2022. The Blue Line was extended through Shoreline to Shoreline North/185th station on September 14, 2024, as part of the realignment of buses for the opening of the Lynnwood Link Extension. Community Transit also retrofitted existing Blue and Green line stations to use new digital signage and ticket vending machines; on-board digital signage is planned to be installed by late 2025.

A fourth Swift route, named the Gold Line, is planned to extend bus rapid transit service to Marysville and Smokey Point by 2031 at a cost of $181 million. An extension of the Green Line into Downtown Bothell and the University of Washington, Bothell campus is planned to open by 2031 with up to six new stations, two of which would be shared with the upcoming Stride S3 Line. The Silver Line is planned to begin at Seaway Transit Center and travel along SR 527 and 132nd Street to a new park-and-ride lot in northern Cathcart. It is scheduled to begin construction in 2031 and open in 2037 at a cost of $153.6 million. A proposal to add an intra-city line within Everett between the Riverfront and waterfront areas was floated in 2019 during discussions of a merger between Community Transit and Everett Transit.

== See also ==
- Community Transit
- List of bus rapid transit systems in North America
- RapidRide
