= North City =

North City may refer to:

- North City, Amarna, Egypt
- North City, Illinois, United States
- North City, San Diego, California, United States
- North City, Shoreline, Washington, Washington, United States
