= Swift Green Line =

Bus rapid transit route in Snohomish County, Washington

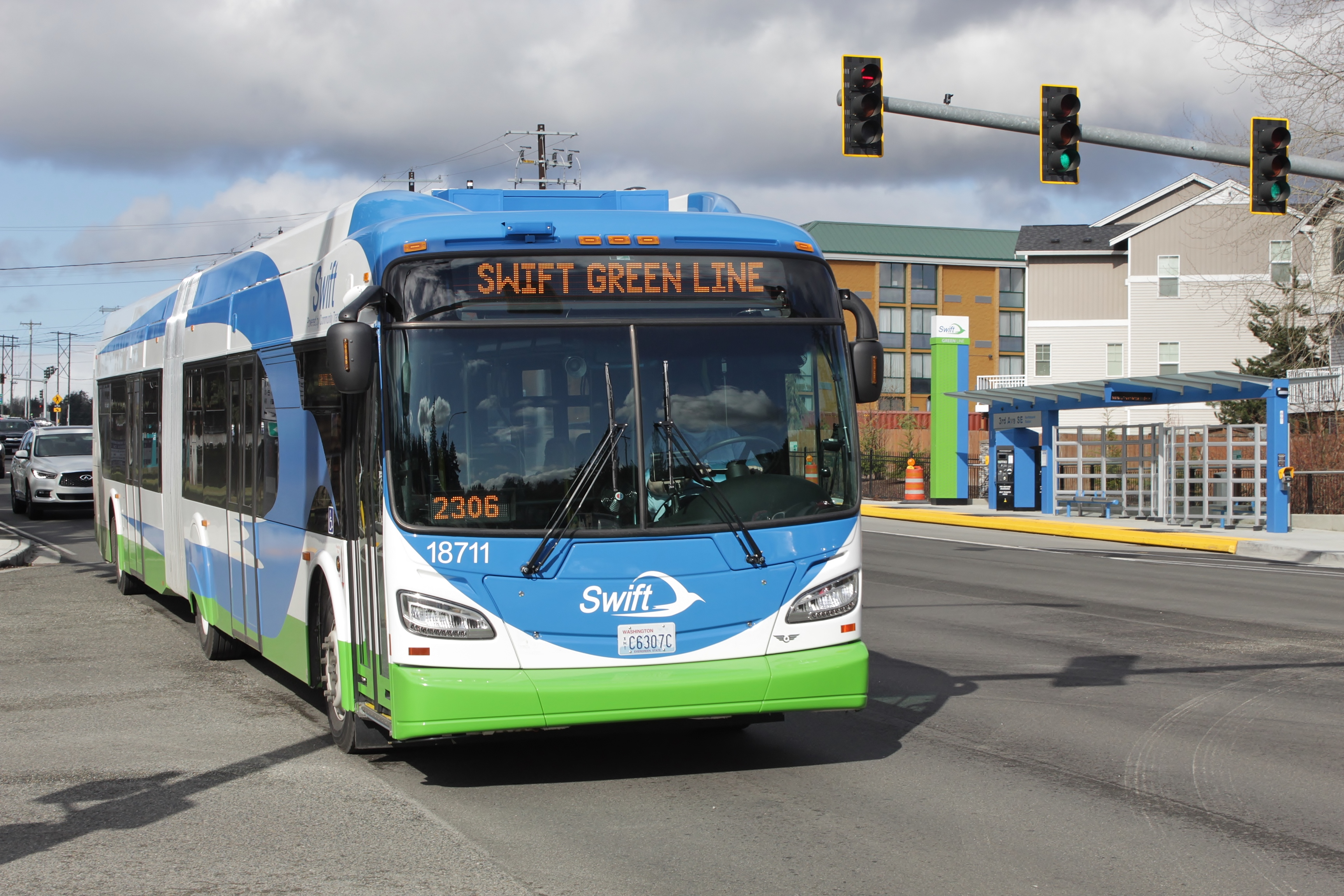
- A southbound Green Line bus at 3rd Avenue SE

Overview
- System: Swift
- Operator: Community Transit
- Status: In service
- Began service: March 24, 2019
- Predecessors: Community Transit route 105

Route
- Route type: Bus rapid transit
- Locale: Snohomish County
- Communities served: Everett, Mill Creek, Bothell
- Start: Seaway Transit Center
- Via: Airport Way, State Route 527
- End: Canyon Park Park and Ride
- Length: 12.5 miles (20.1 km)
- Stations: 32

Service
- Frequency: 10 minutes
- Weekend frequency: 15–20 minutes
- Transfers: Blue Line at Airport Road; Orange Line in Mill Creek; Sound Transit Express at Canyon Park and Seaway

The Swift Green Line is a bus rapid transit route in Snohomish County, Washington, United States, part of the Swift network operated by Community Transit. It was opened in 2019 and travels 12.5 miles (20.1 km) along Airport Way and State Route 527, connecting 32 stations in the cities of Everett, Mill Creek, and Bothell. Its termini are at Seaway Transit Center, adjacent to the Boeing factory, and Canyon Park Park and Ride on Interstate 405; the Green Line also intersects the Blue Line in Everett and also serves Paine Field.

The Green Line was proposed in 2013 and began construction in July 2017. It cost $73 million to construct and opened on March 24, 2019. An extension into Downtown Bothell and to the city's University of Washington branch campus is planned to open by 2031.

== History ==
Community Transit announced plans for a second Swift line in November 2013, tentatively named "Swift II", that would serve a 12.5-mile-long (20.1 km) corridor between the Boeing Everett Factory and Mill Creek. The line was created out of two Transit Emphasis Corridors on Airport Road and State Route 527. A study was partially funded by the state legislature in 2012 and was prepared by Parsons Brinckerhoff, determining that the project would cost $42–48 million to construct and attract 3,300 riders when it opened.

The Federal Transit Administration approved project development in December 2014, a prerequisite to federal grants for capital construction and vehicle acquisition. During the 2015 session of the Washington State Legislature, Community Transit was granted the authority to increase sales taxes to fund operation of Swift II, pending voter approval via a ballot measure; the Washington State Department of Transportation also gave $6.8 million in funding to build the line's northern terminus at Seaway Transit Center. The ballot measure was approved by voters in November 2015, allowing for construction to begin sooner.

In August 2016, Community Transit announced that the Swift II project would be known as the "Green Line", while the first line would become the "Blue Line", and that the line would open in 2019. The $73 million cost of the Swift Green Line project was mostly covered by federal subsidies, including $43 million from a Federal Transit Administration "Small Starts" grant awarded in 2018. An additional $6.8 million grant from the Washington State Department of Transportation was used to build the line's northern terminus at Seaway Transit Center.

Construction on the Seaway Transit Center began in May 2017 and was scheduled to be finished by mid-2018. Construction on the rest of the stations and the 128th Street overpass began in November 2017. The queue jump and bus lane on the west side of the 128th Street interchange was opened in January 2018. Service began on March 24, 2019, a few weeks after the start of passenger flights to Paine Field. At the onset of the COVID-19 pandemic in March 2020, Green Line buses were temporarily reduced to a weekday frequency of 15 minutes; fare collection was also suspended until June 1. The line's normal service level—with a frequency of 10 minutes on weekdays—was restored in September 2020.

An extension into downtown Bothell and the University of Washington Bothell campus is planned to between 2028 and 2031 following the completion of new lanes on Bothell Way. Up to six new stations would be added south of Canyon Park, including two shared the Stride S3 Line, a bus rapid transit route operated by Sound Transit.

== Stations ==
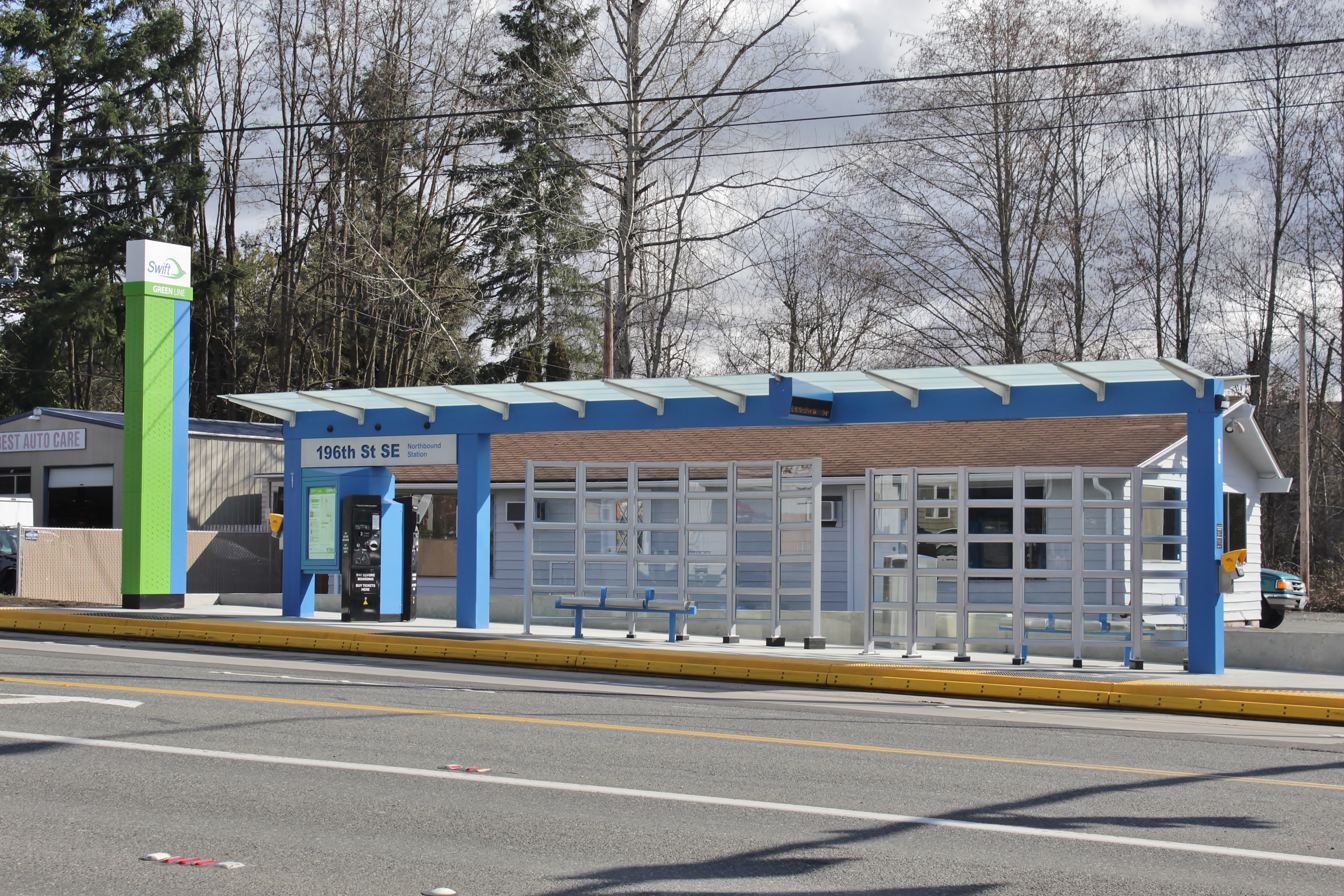
The northbound station at 196th Street Southeast

The Green Line serves 34 stations, grouped into 18 pairs with two terminals, in the cities of Everett, Mill Creek, and Bothell. Each station has a raised platform for level boarding, ticket vending machines, ORCA card readers, and real-time arrivals information. The Blue Line intersects at the Highway 99 station, requiring a street crossing to complete the connection. The line also serves two park and ride lots at Mariner and McCollum Park.

Station	Location	City	Notes
Seaway Transit Center	Seaway Blvd. & 75th Street SW	Everett	Adjacent to Boeing Everett Factory
Kasch Park Road	Airport Road & Kasch Park Road	Everett	
100th Street SW	Airport Road & 100th Street SW	Everett	Adjacent to Paine Field and passenger airline terminal
112th Street SW	Airport Road & 112th Street SW	Everett	Adjacent to Paine Field
Highway 99	Airport Road & Highway 99	Everett	Transfer to Blue Line
Gibson Road	128th Street SW & Gibson Road	Everett	
4th Avenue W	128th Street SW & 4th Avenue W	Everett	Adjacent to Mariner Park and Ride
3rd Avenue SE	128th Street SE & 3rd Avenue SE	Everett	Adjacent to Interurban Trail
Dumas Road	128th Street SE & Dumas Road	Mill Creek	Adjacent to McCollum Park; Transfer to Orange Line
16th Avenue SE	16th Avenue SE & 132nd Street SE	Mill Creek	
Trillium Boulevard	Bothell-Everett Highway & Trillium Blvd.	Mill Creek	Station shared with Orange Line
153rd Street SE	Bothell-Everett Highway & 153rd Street SE	Mill Creek	Adjacent to Mill Creek Town Center; Station shared with Orange Line
164th Street SE	Bothell-Everett Highway & 164th Street SE	Mill Creek	Adjacent to Mill Creek Town Center; Northbound station shared with Orange Line
180th Street SE	Bothell-Everett Highway & 180th Street SE	North Creek	
196th Street SE	Bothell-Everett Highway & 196th Street SE	North Creek	
208th Street SE	Bothell-Everett Highway & 208th Street SE	North Creek	
220th Street SE	Bothell-Everett Highway & 220th Street SE	Bothell	Northbound only
Canyon Park Park and Ride	22400 17th Avenue SE	Bothell	Transfer to Sound Transit Express routes 532 and 535

== Service ==
The Green Line runs at a frequency of every 10 minutes on weekdays from 6 a.m. to 7 p.m., and 15 to 20 minutes on weekends and early mornings and nights on weekdays. The earliest trips depart at 4 a.m. on weekdays, 6 a.m. on Saturdays, and 7 a.m. on Sundays. The last trips end at 11 p.m. on weekdays, 10 p.m. on Saturdays, and 9 p.m. on Sundays. It takes approximately 36 to 39 minutes for buses to travel the entire length of the Green Line.

Service on the Green Line was reduced to every 15 minutes on weekdays in March 2020 due to the COVID-19 pandemic. Fare collection was also suspended until June 1 to increase physical distancing between passengers, drivers, and fare ambassadors. Full service was restored in September 2020, but was reduced again to 12 minute weekday frequencies in March 2022 due to a lack of drivers. The evening and weekend frequency was improved to every 15 minutes on August 30, 2025.
