= Swift Orange Line =

Bus rapid transit route in Washington, U.S.

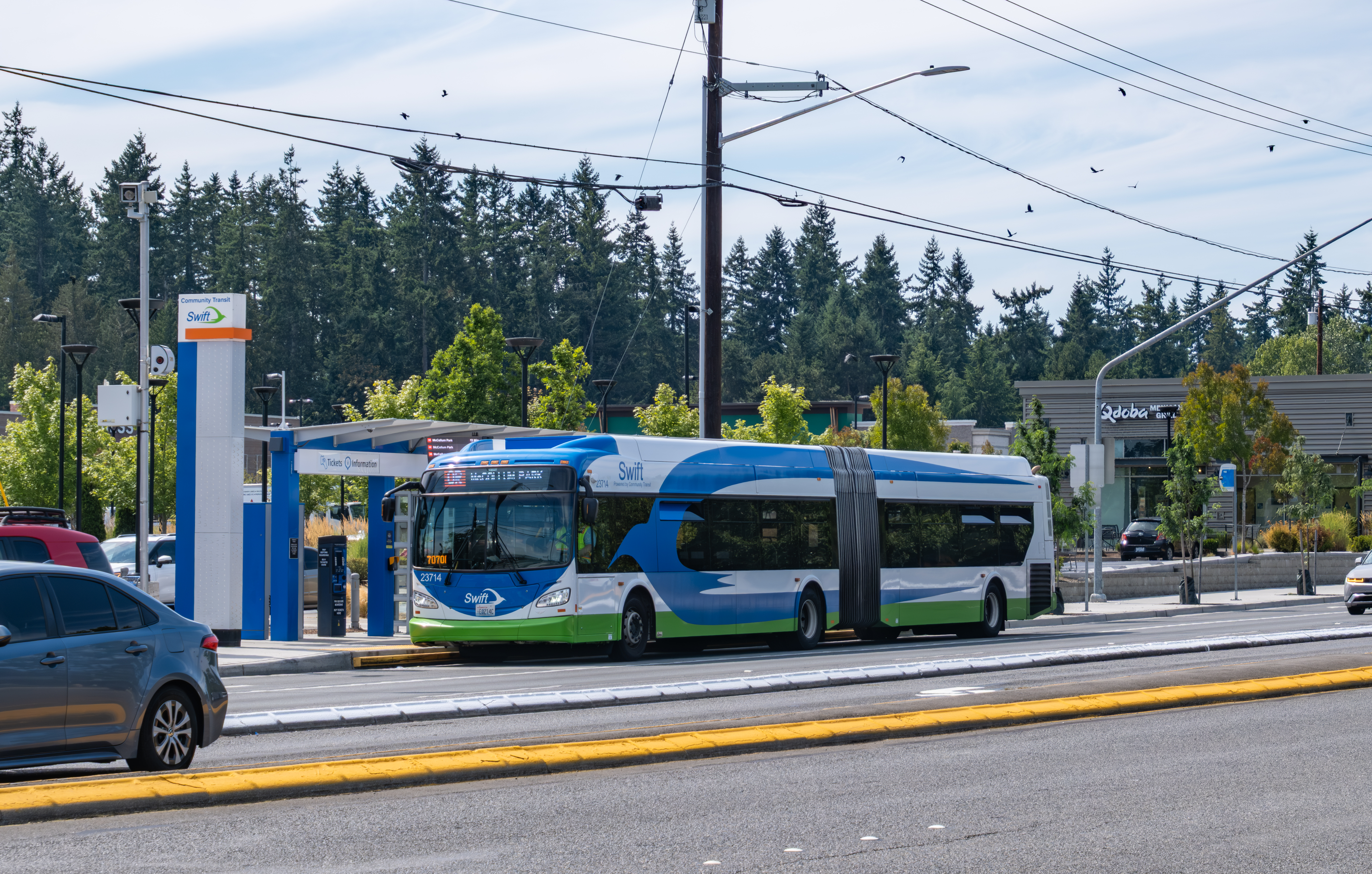
- Orange Line bus at the Highway 99 station

Overview
- System: Swift
- Operator: Community Transit
- Status: In service
- Began service: March 30, 2024

Route
- Route type: Bus rapid transit
- Locale: Snohomish County, Washington, U.S.
- Communities served: Lynnwood, Mill Creek
- Start: Edmonds College
- End: McCollum Park
- Length: 11 miles (18 km)
- Stations: 16

Service
- Frequency: 10–12 minutes
- Weekend frequency: 15–20 minutes

The Swift Orange Line is a bus rapid transit line in Snohomish County, Washington, United States. It is the third line of the Swift Bus Rapid Transit system operated by Community Transit and opened in March 2024. The 11-mile (18 km) line runs from Edmonds College to McCollum Park, generally serving the cities of Lynnwood and Mill Creek with 16 stations. The Orange Line provides connections between the existing Swift Blue and Green lines, Edmonds College, Alderwood Mall, and Lynnwood City Center station—the terminus of the Link light rail system.

== History ==
Early planning for a third Swift line was funded by a 0.3 percent sales tax increase that was approved by voters in November 2015, which also funded construction of the Swift Green Line. Community Transit designated the 196th Street and 164th Street corridors between Edmonds and Mill Creek as potential routes for the new line, which was later named the Orange Line. Both streets had been identified as potential bus rapid transit corridors in an earlier long-range plan that was published in 2011.

The preferred route for the Orange Line was approved by Community Transit in October 2018. It would travel from Edmonds College to Lynnwood and Mill Creek with connections to existing Swift lines as well as Link light rail, which was set to be extended to Lynnwood Transit Center (now Lynnwood City Center station) by the time the Orange Line opened in 2023. The project had a budget of $79.4 million, with the majority of funds from a Federal Transit Administration grant and other non-local sources. A groundbreaking ceremony for the Orange Line was held at Lynnwood Transit Center on April 19, 2022.

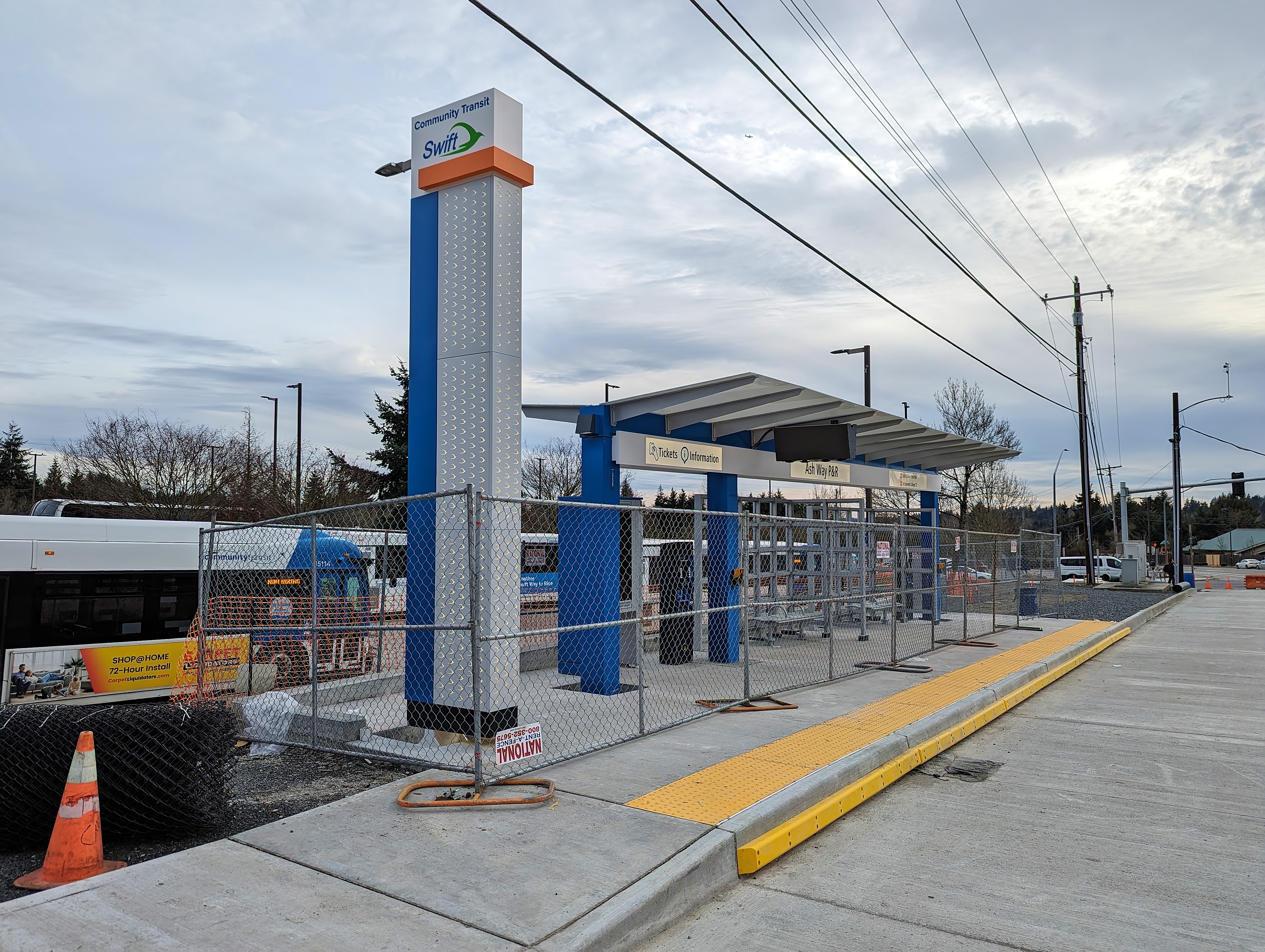
Station construction at the Ash Way Park & Ride in early 2024

The new line required the construction of new transit centers at Edmonds College and McCollum Park to replace existing facilities. Work at Edmonds College began in May 2022. During work on the relocated McCollum Park bus loop, contractors pierced the cap and liner of a former landfill at the site when constructing stormwater drain. The excavation resulted in fines for Community Transit and its contractor from the Washington State Department of Ecology for potential water contamination by runoff from the landfill. The Orange Line began service on March 30, 2024, with a ribbon-cutting ceremony at Lynnwood City Center station and block party hosted by Edmonds College that drew hundreds of people in attendance. For the ribbon-cutting ceremony, Sound Transit parked an empty light rail train that had been used for testing. The Lynnwood Link Extension opened for revenue service on August 30, 2024.

In April 2024, the first full month of service on the Orange Line, the route had 50,355 boardings and an average of 1,943 per weekday. The westbound station at Mill Creek Boulevard and full bus loop at McCollum Park opened in July 2024.

== Route ==
The Orange Line travels for 11 miles (18 km) between termini at two transit centers: Edmonds College in the west and McCollum Park in the east. The line uses 196th Street and intersects with the Blue Line on State Route 99; from there, buses continue to Lynnwood City Center station, a major regional transit center that will have light rail service in late 2024. The line then turns north onto Alderwood Mall Boulevard to serve the Alderwood Mall, continuing on 36th Avenue West and 164th Street; buses then divert to serve Ash Way Park and Ride, another regional transit center. In Mill Creek, the Orange Line turns north onto State Route 527 and shares stations with the Green Line until it reaches McCollum Park.

== Stations ==
The line has 16 station pairs that are mainly on streets in Lynnwood and Mill Creek. Swift stations include a higher curb for level boarding, larger shelters, ticket vending machines, and ORCA card readers.

Orange Line stations
Station	Location	City	Notes
Edmonds College Transit Center	68th Avenue W & 202nd Street SW	Lynnwood	
Highway 99	196th Street SW & State Route 99	Lynnwood	Transfer to Blue Line
Lynnwood City Center station	200th Street SW & 46th Avenue W	Lynnwood	Transfer to Link light rail
188th Street SW	33rd Avenue W & 188th Street SW	Lynnwood	Adjacent to Alderwood Mall
180th Place SW	36th Avenue W & 180th Place SW	Lynnwood	
Swamp Creek Park & Ride	164th Street SW & Wildwood Drive	—	
Ash Way Park & Ride	Ash Way & 164th Street SW	—	
Larch Way	164th Street SE & Larch Way	Mill Creek	
North Road	164th Street SE & North Road	Mill Creek	
Mill Creek Boulevard	164th Street SE & Mill Creek Boulevard	Mill Creek	Westbound only Adjacent to Mill Creek Town Center; Transfer to Green Line
164th Street SE	Bothell–Everett Highway & 164th Street SE	Mill Creek	Eastbound only Transfer to Green Line
153rd Street SE	Bothell–Everett Highway & 153rd Street SE	Mill Creek	Shared with Green Line; Adjacent to Mill Creek Town Center
Trillium Boulevard	Bothell–Everett Highway & Trillium Boulevard	Mill Creek	Shared with Green Line
McCollum Park Park & Ride	Dumas Road & 128th Street SW	Mill Creek	Transfer to Green Line

== Service ==
Buses on the Orange Line arrive every 10 to 12 minutes during daytime hours on weekdays and every 15 to 20 minutes at other times, including weekends. A set of 15 articulated buses manufactured by New Flyer was ordered to accommodate the increase in Swift service; each bus can carry 70 passengers and have three interior bicycle racks.
