= Lynnwood City Center station =

Bus station and light rail station in Lynnwood, Washington

40 Lynnwood City Center
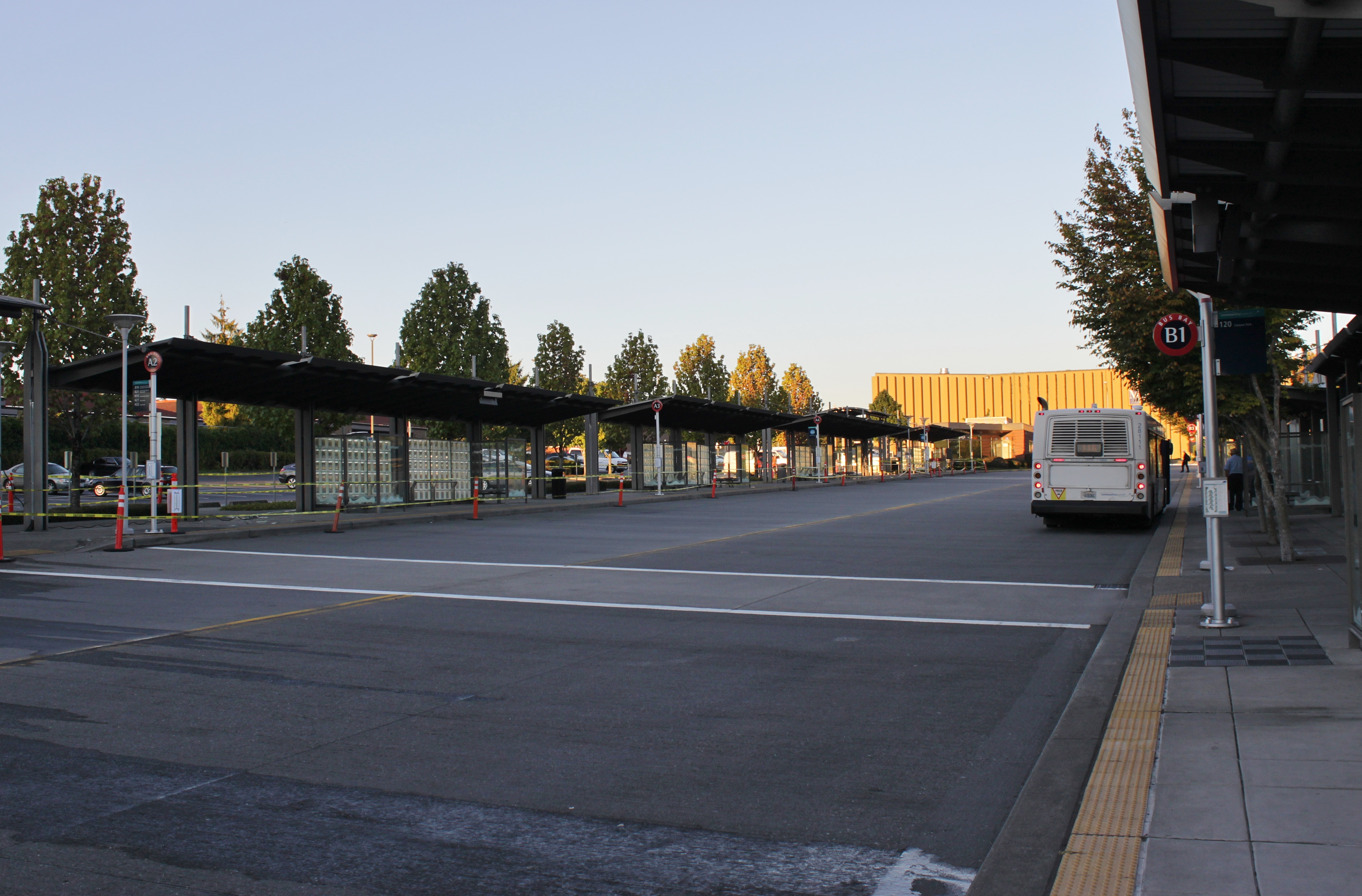
- Northward view of the A and B bays in 2016

General information
- Location: 20100 48th Avenue West; Lynnwood, Washington, U.S.
- Coordinates: 47°48′58″N 122°17′47″W
- System: Link light rail
- Owner: Washington State Department of Transportation, Sound Transit
- Platforms: 1 island platform
- Tracks: 2
- Train operators: Sound Transit
- Bus routes: 19
- Bus stands: 20
- Bus operators: Community Transit (Swift); Sound Transit Express

Construction
- Structure type: Elevated
- Parking: 1,670 parking spaces
- Cycle facilities: Bicycle lockers and racks
- Accessible: Yes

History
- Opened: May 25, 1981 (bus); August 30, 2024 (light rail)
- Rebuilt: 2003, 2019–2024

Passengers
- 4,330 daily weekday boardings (2025); 1,487,125 total boardings (2025)

Services
Preceding station	Sound Transit	Following station
Link
Terminus	1 Line	Mountlake Terrace toward Federal Way Downtown
Terminus	2 Line	Mountlake Terrace toward Downtown Redmond
Future service
West Alderwood toward Everett	3 Line Everett Extension (2037)	Mountlake Terrace toward Alaska Junction
Location

Lynnwood City Center station is a light rail and bus station in Lynnwood, Washington, United States. It is the largest transit hub in southwestern Snohomish County and is the northern terminus of the 1 Line and 2 Line, both part of the Link light rail system managed by Sound Transit. The station is also served by Community Transit and Sound Transit Express buses and includes a parking garage with 1,670 spaces and bicycle lockers.

A park and ride lot near Interstate 5 and 44th Avenue West in Lynnwood opened in May 1981 and was the largest of its kind in Washington, with 808 stalls. It was rebuilt by Sound Transit in 2003 and renamed to Lynnwood Transit Center. A light rail project to extend service to Lynnwood was approved by voters in 2008 as part of the Sound Transit 2 ballot measure and began construction in 2019. The light rail station at the transit center opened on August 30, 2024, and the facility was renamed to Lynnwood City Center station. The Swift Orange Line, a bus rapid transit service operated by Community Transit, serves the station. Sound Transit's Stride bus rapid transit system will also terminate at the station, connecting it with areas along Interstate 405.

== Location and layout ==
The Lynnwood City Center station is located on the north side of Interstate 5 at 44th Avenue West, southwest of Alderwood Mall in Lynnwood. The 17.5-acre (7.1 ha) transit center includes 20 bus bays and a park and ride. A five-story parking garage on the southeast side of the site provides 1,670 park and ride spaces and has driveways from two streets. The bus bays have passenger information displays that have real-time arrival information for inbound buses. A customer service center called "RideStore" is located at the north end of the transit center.

The transit center is also located adjacent to the Interurban Trail, which runs through the southeast parking lot and connects it to Alderwood Mall, Aurora Village and downtown Everett.

The 2003 renovation of the transit center came with the installation of two pieces of public artwork created by Claudia Fitch, known collectively as Shift. The art installation consists of a pair of 30-foot-tall (9.1 m) steel beacons resembling newel posts that are used to mark the two main crosswalks.

== History ==
Planning for a large park and ride lot in Lynnwood began in the late 1970s with the formation of Community Transit and increasing population growth in Lynnwood that had begun to affect the nearby Northgate lot. Construction on 13-acre (5.3 ha) lot began in February 1980, with the project's $1.5 million cost paid for almost entirely by the Federal Highway Administration. It was scheduled to open in September 1980, but construction was delayed by the discovery of underground springs. The Lynnwood park and ride opened on May 25, 1981, with 808 stalls, becoming the largest park and ride in the state of Washington, serving Community Transit as well as Seattle-bound commuter buses operated by Metro Transit. It also became the main bus hub for southern Snohomish County, replacing a street on the north side of the Fred Meyer store in Lynnwood.

The park and ride regularly reached capacity in its first years and prompted drivers to park in unauthorized areas. Several reliever lots were built in neighboring areas, including eastern Edmonds and Mountlake Terrace, but the Lynnwood lot remained at capacity. Plans to expand the lot were part of the first Sound Transit funding package that was approved by voters in 1996, along with plans for a direct access ramp to Interstate 5's high-occupancy vehicle lanes (HOV lanes). The bays would be relocated to the north and expanded to accommodate 20 buses at a time. Sound Transit Express service to Lynnwood began in September 1999 and construction of the new transit center began in August 2002.

In September 2003, the rebuilt the park and ride lot was opened and renamed to Lynnwood Transit Center by Sound Transit and Community Transit. The $33.6 million project expanded the lot to over 17 acres (6.9 ha), added 300 parking spaces to the lot, and consolidated the bus bays on the site of an old warehouse; additional amenities built during the project included a coffee stand, bathrooms, public art, and a customer service center. The following year, the $31.2 million HOV direct access ramp, the first of its kind in the state, was opened to replace the congested onramp on 44th Avenue West.

=== Light rail ===
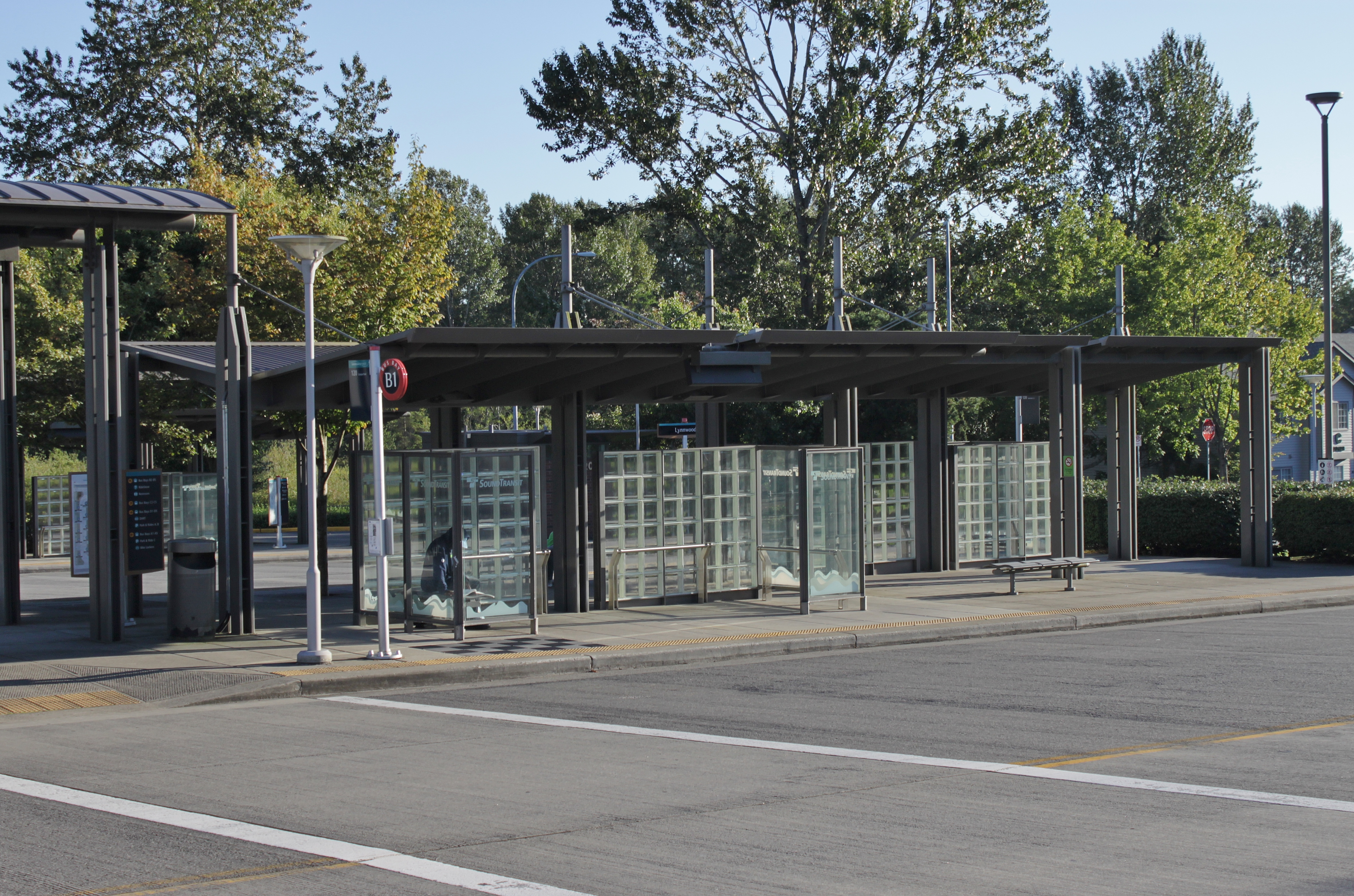
A typical bus bay at Lynnwood Transit Center

Lynnwood Transit Center was selected as the northern terminus of the Lynnwood Link Extension, a 8.5-mile (13.7 km) light rail extension that is part of the Link light rail system. The extension and its $1.6 billion in funding was approved by voters in 2008. The extension is projected to carry 63,000 to 74,000 daily riders by 2035; 17,900 daily riders are expected to board at Lynnwood Transit Center's station.

The light rail station is elevated 24 feet (7.3 m) above the direct access ramp and southeastern parking lot, crossing from the southwest to the northeast. The station has two entrances connected to its mezzanine below platform level: one that travels across the roadway and leads to a ground-level plaza; and another with direct access to a five-story parking garage with 500 stalls. The existing bus station was retained and slightly expanded to accommodate more layover space. Parking at the transit center would increase to 1,900 stalls, with room to expand further. The station's official name, Lynnwood City Center, was adopted in July 2017. Further design changes, including the addition of 11 bus layover spaces, were approved in 2018.

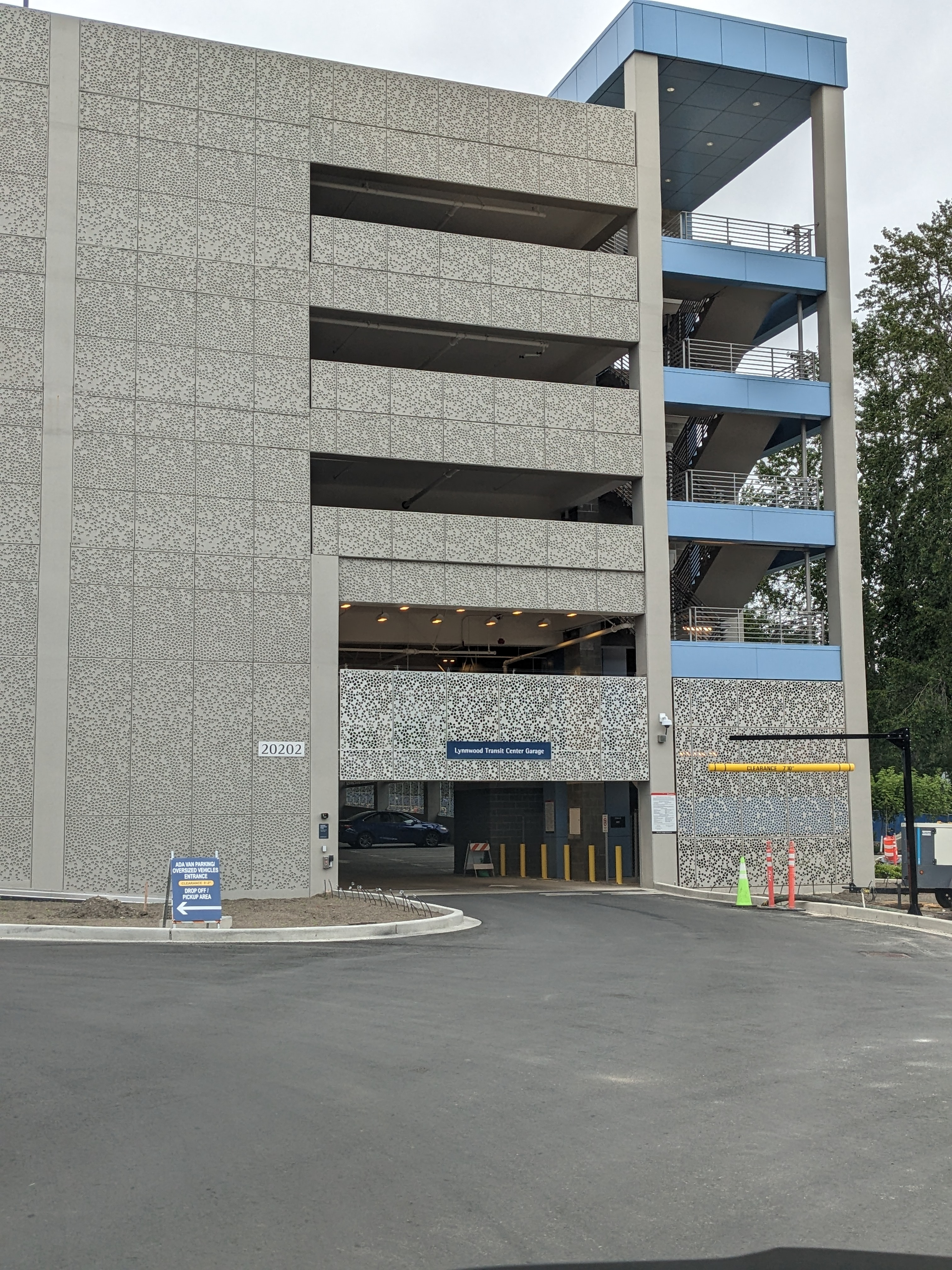
The five-story parking garage at Lynnwood Transit Center opened in April 2023

Construction of the station required the demolition of a furniture store to the east of the bus bays, a well as a gas station, restaurant, and strip mall. Demolition of the stores began in July 2018 and the project broke ground on September 3, 2019. In early 2020, Sound Transit opened a temporary parking lot on the east side of 46th Avenue West to replace several closed areas of the park and ride that were repurposed for construction staging. The southwest lot was closed in June 2022 and replaced by a leased area on the north side of 200th Street Southwest.

Construction on the five-story parking garage began in October 2020 and it opened for use on April 17, 2023. The garage replaced the existing and temporary surface lots, which were then converted for construction staging and bus layover space; 226 surface stalls remained once construction is complete, giving Lynnwood Transit Center a total of 1,900 park and ride spaces. The station campus was awarded LEED Gold certification in 2024 for its environmentally-friendly and sustainable design features. Community Transit opened its rebuilt RideStore at the transit center on August 27, 2024.

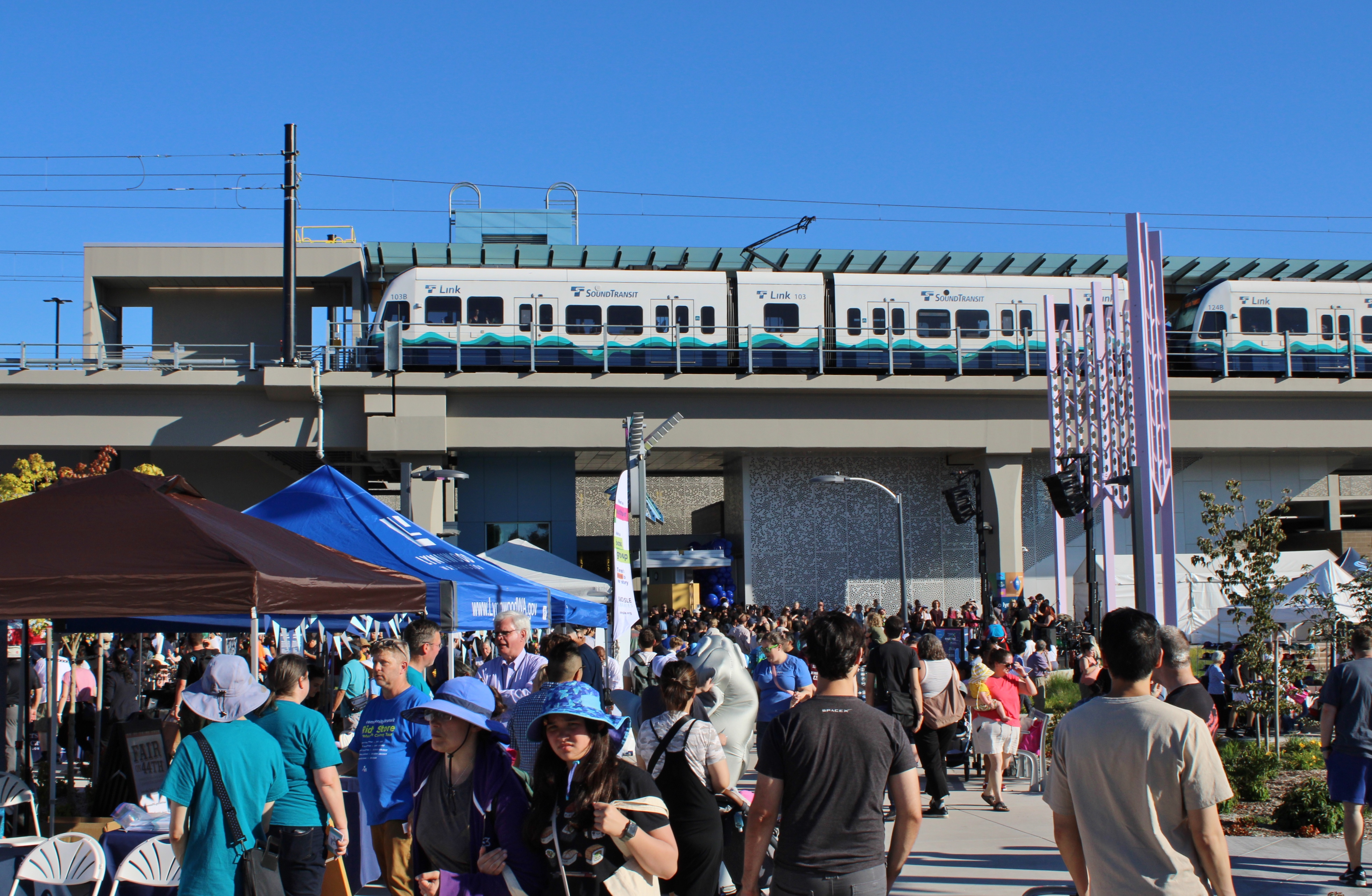
The light rail station during opening day in August 2024

Light rail service from the station began at 12:37 p.m. on August 30, 2024, on the 1 Line. The ribbon-cutting ceremony for the extension was held at Lynnwood City Center station and attended by hundreds of people; it was followed by a night market with booths and vendors representing 165 community organizations. 2 Line service from Lynnwood is expected to begin in 2025. Trains from Lynnwood are anticipated to take 28 minutes to reach Westlake station in Downtown Seattle. Community Transit trunated most of its commuter routes to Lynnwood Transit Center and added new all-day express routes along the Interstate 5 corridor; a temporary Sound Transit Express route that runs parallel to the 1 Line launched in 2024 to accommodate overflow passengers until the 2 Line opens and provides full capacity to Lynnwood. The 2 Line entered simulated service on February 14, 2026, with passengers able to board trains from Lynnwood to International District/Chinatown station.

A further extension of the light rail system to Everett is planned to carry the 1 Line and 2 Line and be opened in phases from 2037 to 2041.

== Transit-oriented development ==
Sound Transit determined in 2011 that the area around the transit center had "moderate to strong" potential for transit-oriented development, including housing and offices. The area around the transit center is part of a regional growth center designated by the Puget Sound Regional Council; the Lynnwood city government designated the area between the transit center and the Alderwood Mall to the northeast as its city center, preparing for heavy development that is expected to follow light rail expansion. The city raised the height limits for buildings in the area to 350 feet (110 m) in 2005, looking to "resemble downtown Bellevue".

A 19-acre (7.7 ha) strip mall north of 200th Street Southwest is planned to be redeveloped into Northline Village, a complex of mid-rise buildings and parks. The buildings would have 1,369 total housing units, retail space, and offices. The city government approved a 15-year development agreement in 2019 but construction has been paused due to financial issues. The light rail station's northeast construction staging area was offered for transit-oriented affordable housing development per Sound Transit's policies for reusing surplus land. A 2024 proposal from Housing Hope for the site comprises two buildings with 167 units of affordable units in various configurations, a medical clinic, a community center, and other spaces. The planned complex would span a daylit creek. The plaza area at the station is planned to host a seasonal farmers' market beginning in 2027 through a rent-free agreement between Sound Transit and the Lynnwood city government.

== Services ==
Lynnwood City Center is the terminus of the 1 Line and 2 Line, both part of the Link light rail system. The two lines travel south to Downtown Seattle and split at International District/Chinatown station; the 1 Line continues south to Seattle–Tacoma International Airport and Federal Way, while the 2 line turns east to serve Bellevue and Redmond. Mountlake Terrace is the next stop to the south; Lynnwood City Center is 26 stations north of Federal Way Downtown, the southern terminus of the 1 Line, and the 25 stations from Downtown Redmond, the eastern terminus of the 2 Line. Link light rail trains serve the station 20 hours a day on weekdays and Saturdays, from 5:00 a.m. to 12:00 a.m.; and 18 hours on Sundays, from 6:00 a.m. to 12:00 a.m. During regular weekday service, trains on each line operate roughly every eight minutes during rush hour, ten minutes during midday operation, and twelve to fifteen minutes in the early morning and at night. On weekends, trains on each line arrive at Lynnwood City Center station every ten minutes during midday hours and every twelve to fifteen minutes during mornings and evenings. The two lines combine for frequencies of four minutes during rush hour and five minutes during midday and weekend service. The station is approximately 31 minutes from Westlake station in Downtown Seattle, 58 minutes from Bellevue Downtown station, and 69 minutes from SeaTac/Airport station. In 2025, an average of 4,330 passengers boarded Link trains at Lynnwood City Center station on weekdays.

The station is a major hub for buses in Snohomish County operated by Community Transit, which operates 921 daily trips that travel through or terminate. In 2016, prior to the completion of light rail service, more than 40 percent of Community Transit's bus routes served the transit center, with 500 total buses passing through each day. Buses arrived at Lynnwood Transit Center at an average frequency of every three minutes during peak periods.

The Swift Orange Line, a bus rapid transit service, connects the station to Edmonds College, Alderwood Mall, and Mill Creek. The network was restructured in September 2024 following the opening of the light rail station to replace express routes that had continued south to Northgate station and Downtown Seattle. These include all-day express routes to Marysville and Stanwood and peak-only routes that serve Mill Creek and Lake Stevens. Community Transit launched a ride-hailing service, called "Zip", in 2022 to serve Lynnwood with a focus on connections between the transit center and local destinations. The regional Sound Transit Express system also truncated its routes at Lynnwood City Center station in 2024 to provide more frequent service. These routes have all-day service to Everett Station and other park-and-ride lots on Interstate 5; an all-day route to Downtown Bellevue via Interstate 405; and peak-only trips to Seaway Transit Center in Everett.

During disruptions to Link light rail service, bus shuttles are used between stations at designated stops. At Lynnwood City Center station, Bay D3 is used by the shuttles.
