= Queue jump =

Road provision allowing buses to get to the front of traffic at intersections

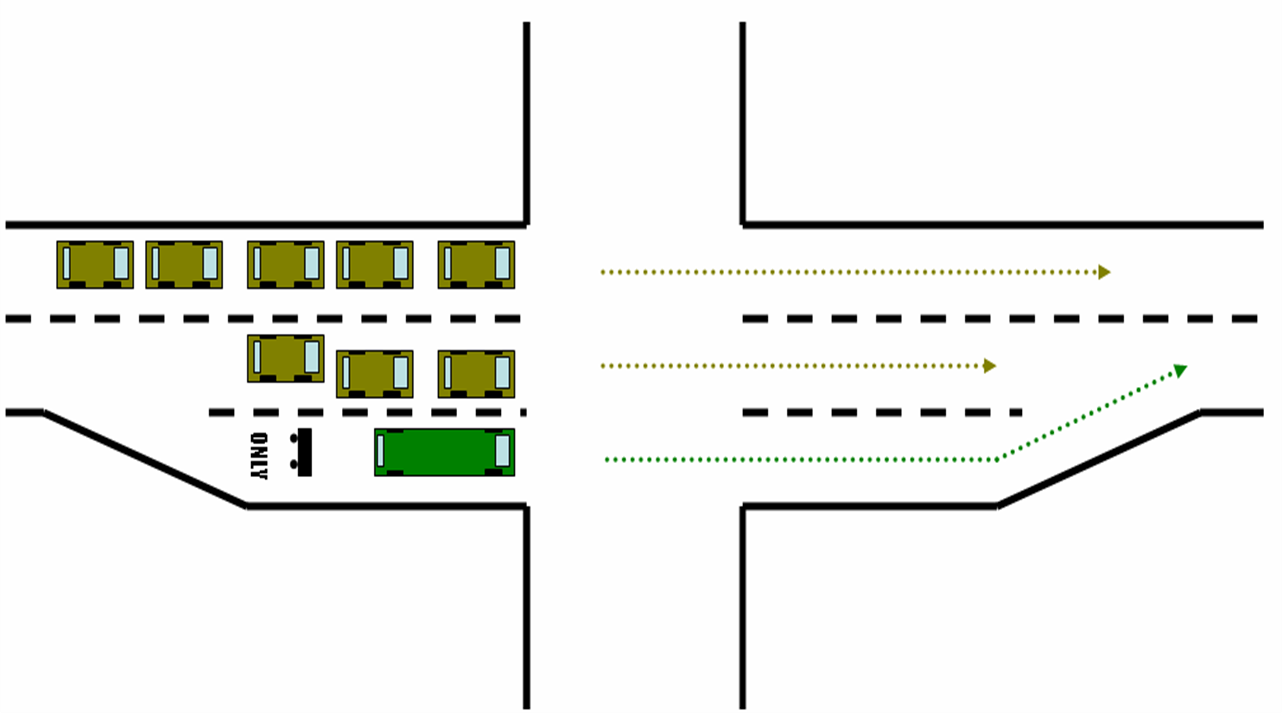
Queue jump lane continued through an intersection

"Queue jump" may also refer to cutting in line.

A queue jump is a type of roadway geometry used to provide preference to buses at intersections, often found in bus rapid transit systems. It consists of an additional travel lane on the approach to a signalised intersection. This lane is often restricted to transit vehicles only. A queue jump lane is usually accompanied by a signal which provides a phase specifically for vehicles within the queue jump. Vehicles in the queue jump lane get a "head-start" over other queued vehicles and can therefore merge into the regular travel lanes immediately beyond the signal. The intent of the lane is to allow the higher-capacity vehicles to cut to the front of the queue, reducing the delay caused by the signal and improving the operational efficiency of the transit system.

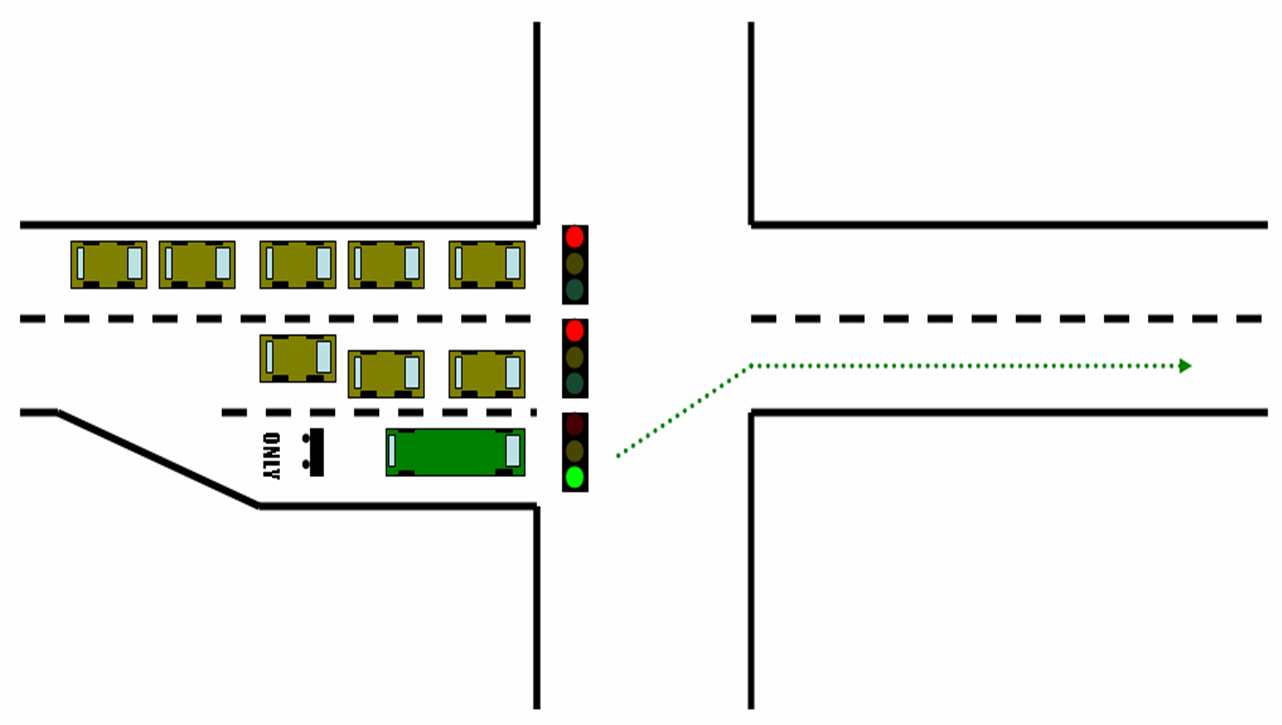
Queue jump lane with a designated signal

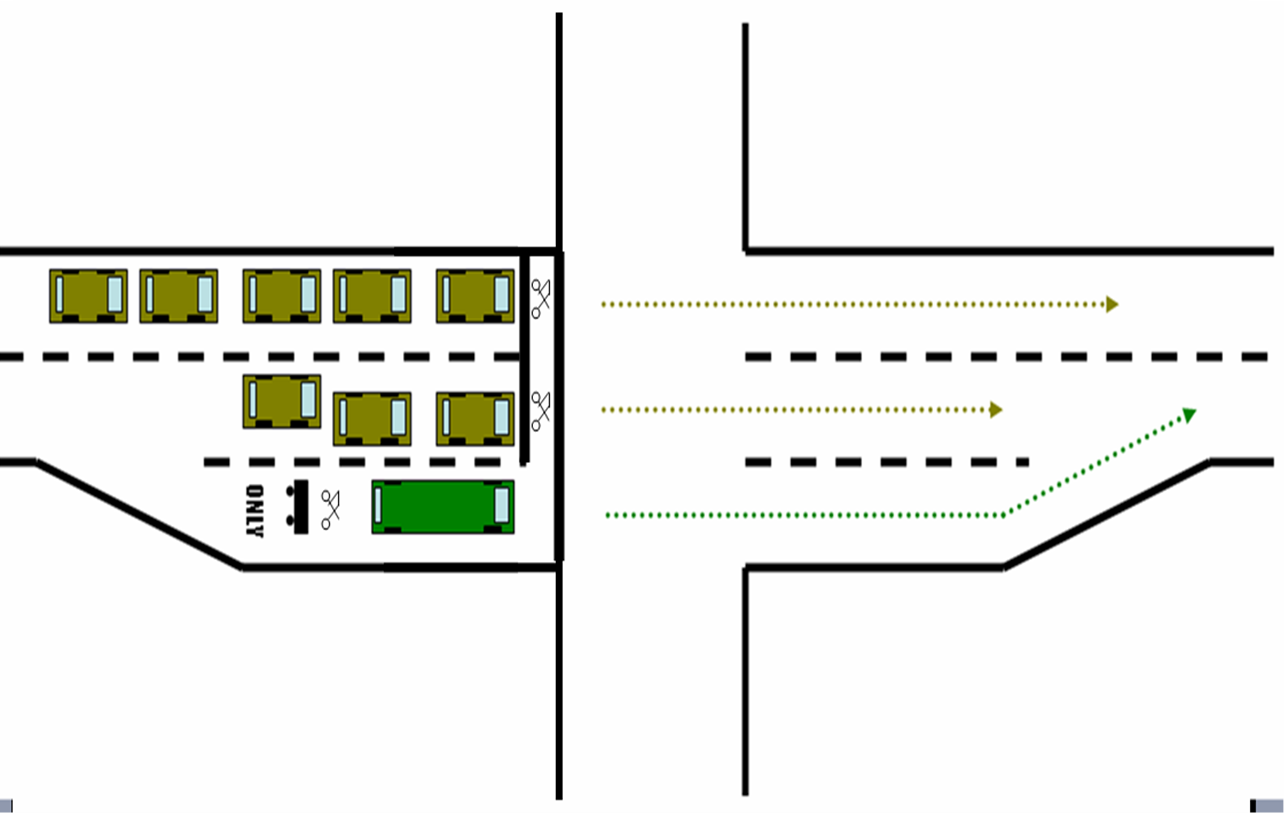
Continuous queue jump lane with provision for bicyclists

== Design considerations ==
Queue jumps are only effective in certain situations. First, there has to be an existing source of delay or roadway congestion; if there is no congestion and the normal traffic signal is usually green, then the bus driver has no reason to move into the queue jump. The length of the queue jump lane needs to be long enough to provide a meaningful time savings. Queue jumps can also be used in situations such as bus stop pullouts or at the end of a bus-only lane, in order to help expedite the bus merge into traffic. Queue jumps may not work well where there are high volumes of right turning vehicles (left turning in UK) that might get in the way of the bus through movement, although in some cases these turning vehicles can be provided a separate lane and/or a protected signal phase at the same time as the advanced transit phase. Available right-of-way is needed to provide the bypass lane.

Bus stop location is another important consideration. Where there are far-side bus stops, an advance signal does not provide any benefit to the bus because it will not be able to merge into traffic during the advance signal phase. Where near-side stops are present, an advance signal can be highly effective in giving the bus a head start, however the bus stop location needs to consider the detection strategy used for the advance signal phase so that the bus is detected only after it is done serving the bus stop. It is preferable to provide a receiving lane on the far side of the intersection to provide an acceleration/merging area, however this is not always a requirement when an advance signal is used.

== Detection strategies and timing ==
When an advance signal is used, it should be actuated by an approaching bus to avoid needlessly delaying other traffic when there is no bus present. If the queue jump lane is designated as bus-only, then standard traffic signal detection such as loop detectors or video detection can be used. If there is a limited amount of other traffic in the lane, then two or more loop detectors can be used and configured with AND logic such that only a long vehicle will actuate the advance phase. If the queue jump lane is shared with a higher volume of other traffic, a more high-tech detection scheme may be needed such as Opticom or RFID. Queue jump advance phases are typically 5–10 seconds in duration; longer time may be needed if multiple buses or right turning traffic need to be flushed through the queue jump in one signal cycle. Pedestrian phases can generally run concurrent with a queue jump phase as long as there are no protected turn phases also running with the queue jump phase.

== Variations ==
Some queue jump lanes permit vehicles such as bicycles, mopeds, and/or motorcycles to use the lanes. In some cases, users of small vehicles may use the queue jump lanes to bypass the regularly queued traffic, at which point the vehicle can then maneuver back into the regular lanes at the front of the queue. Such a scheme is commonly found in London, England. Increasing utilisation of smaller vehicles can reduce the required headway for vehicles, subsequently increasing the densities and therefore capacities supportable by the roadway, and ultimately increasing the overall efficiency for all users of the system. Occasionally, high-occupancy vehicles are allowed to use a queue jump.

== See also ==
- Advanced stop line
- Bus lane
- Bus priority signal
- Straddling bus
