= North City, Shoreline, Washington =

Coordinates: 47°45′21″N 122°18′49″W

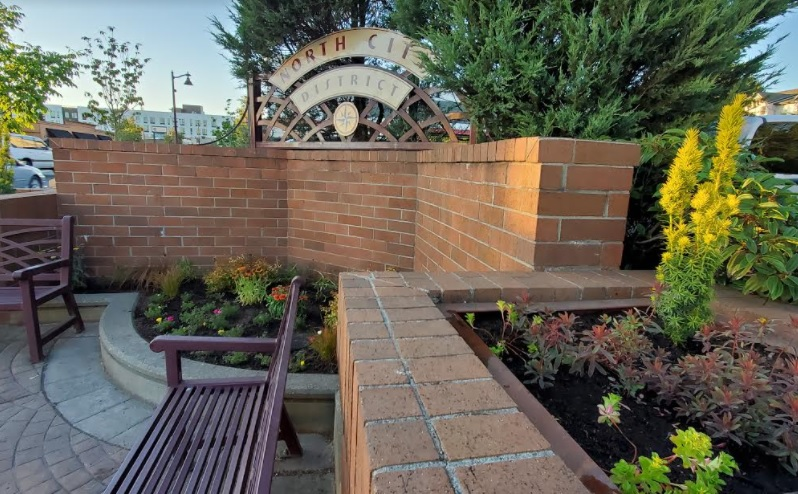
The North City Gateway, on the corner of the neighborhood business district in Shoreline, WA.

North City is a neighborhood within the city of Shoreline, Washington, United States, located north of Seattle. The neighborhood is centered at 15th Avenue N.E. and N.E 175th Street.

== History ==
The North City neighborhood was named in 1947 by local business owners along 15th Avenue N.E.

== See also ==
- Neighborhoods of Shoreline, Washington
