= Lynnwood Link extension =

Light rail expansion in Snohomish County, Washington

The Lynnwood Link extension is a Link light rail extension traveling north from Northgate to Lynnwood in Snohomish County, Washington, United States. The 8.5-mile (13.7 km) light rail extension includes stations in Lynnwood, Mountlake Terrace, and Shoreline along Interstate 5. It is served by 1 Line and 2 Line. The section opened on August 30, 2024, an extension of the 1 Line.

The project was funded by the Sound Transit 2 (ST2) package approved by voters in November 2008, and began construction in 2019. Ridership is expected to be 47,000 to 55,000 daily on the section in 2026.

== Route and stations ==
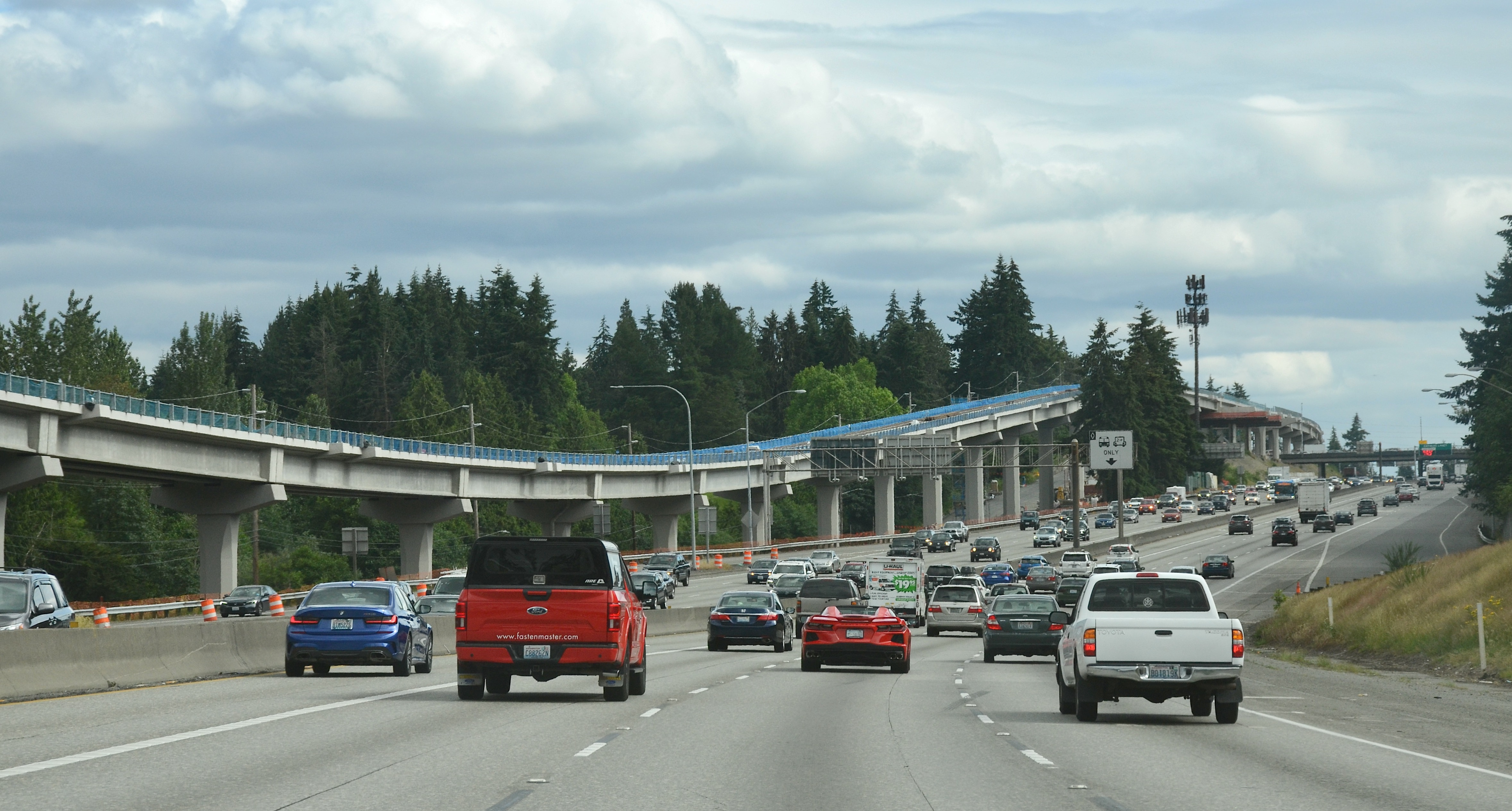
Construction south of NE 145th Street, on a long section of viaduct, viewed from southbound I-5 in 2022

Route proposals for the extension in the early 2010s included paths along Interstate 5 (I-5) and State Route 99 (SR 99); a route preferred by Sound Transit on the latter alignment included an abrupt turn at the King–Snohomish county line to reach the Mountlake Terrace Transit Center and Mountlake Terrace's downtown. Despite the advocation of the SR 99 alignment from some urban theorists, the I-5 alignment was ultimately favored as the faster option when Sound Transit selected in 2011, reducing the project's cost by $600 million; this also avoided potential controversy over land acquisition and construction on SR 99.

In April 2015, the final environmental impact statement (EIS) for the extension was released, and a Record of Decision from the Federal Transit Administration was received in July 2015. The Lynnwood Link Extension begins at Northgate station in Seattle and follows I-5 with stations at Northeast 145th Street, Northeast 185th Street, Mountlake Terrace station, and Lynnwood Transit Center. The EIS also included accommodations for infill stations at NE 130th St and 220th St SW.

In 2013, Sound Transit proposed the construction of a railyard southwest of the Lynnwood Transit Center to serve the extension. The 20-acre (8.1 ha) parcel was owned by the Edmonds School District, who planned their own bus barn on the site and came into conflict with Sound Transit. The land was ultimately retained by the school district and Sound Transit chose in 2015 to build its second operations and maintenance facility in Bellevue.

== History ==
In August 2017, Sound Transit announced that the project would be delayed six months (from late 2023 to mid 2024) and would cost $500 million more than expected, bringing the final budget to $2.9 billion. The changes were due to rising costs associated with land acquisition, labor, and materials in the local market.

The project's groundbreaking ceremony was held on September 3, 2019, and included Governor Jay Inslee, U.S. Senators Patty Murray and Maria Cantwell, and U.S. Representatives Rick Larsen and Suzan DelBene. Testing of trains on the extension began in January 2024 and progressed in June to pre-revenue service with simulated schedules.

Service on the 1 Line to Lynnwood began on August 30, 2024, with opening celebrations at all four stations. An estimated 39,000 passengers boarded trains on the Lynnwood extension that day. Construction delays on the 2 Line limited the number of available trains to Lynnwood until 2025. Major changes to the bus network in Shoreline and Snohomish County, including the truncation of most commuter buses, are scheduled for September 14, 2024. A Sound Transit Express bus route was temporarily used to provide additional Lynnwood–Seattle capacity until the 2 Line was extended in 2026. An infill station at Northeast 130th Street in Seattle was funded by the Sound Transit 3 package and is scheduled to open on September 30, 2026.
