= Interurban Trail (Snohomish County) =

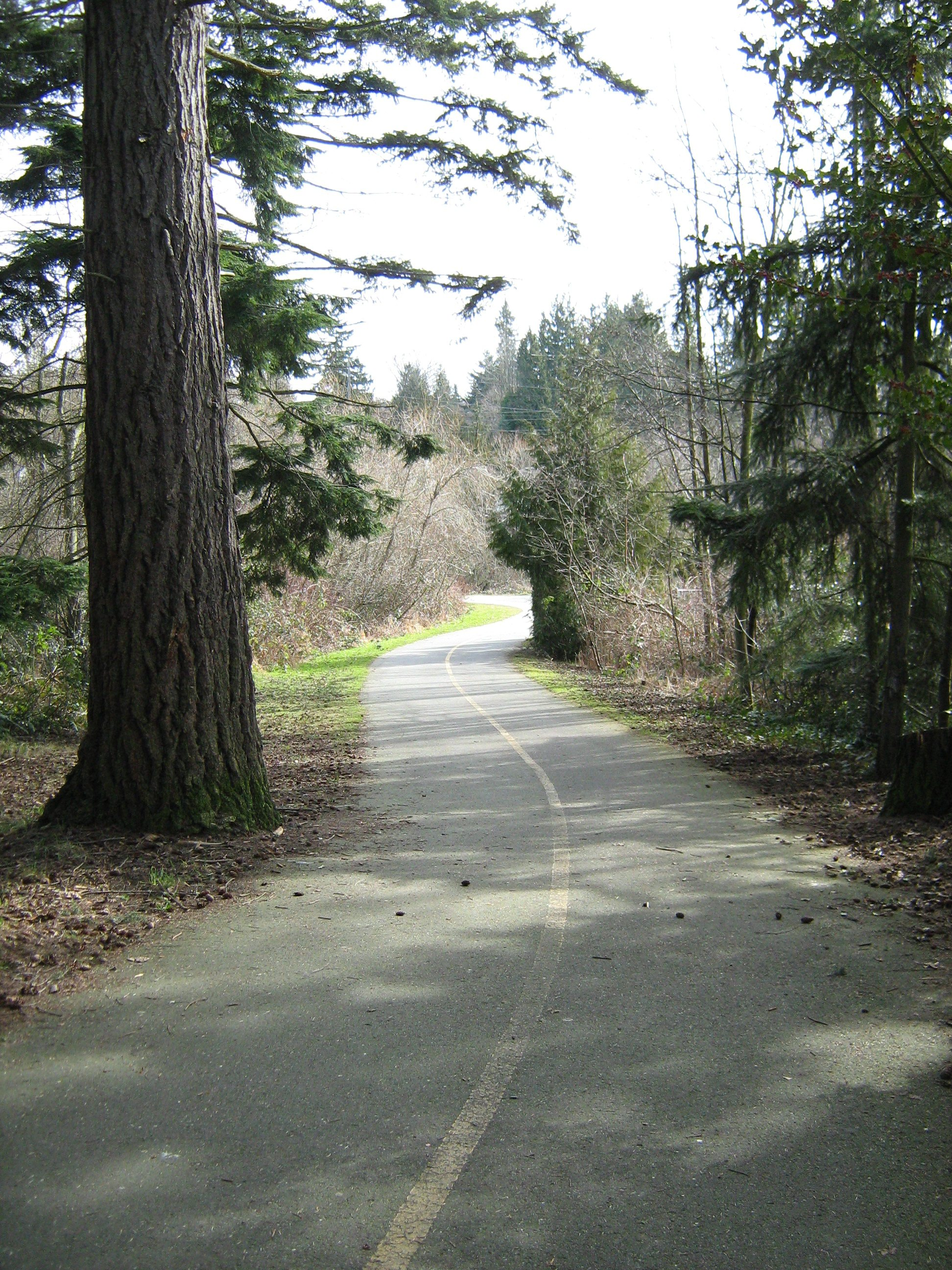
- Interurban Trail near South Lynnwood Neighborhood Park
- Length: 16.0 miles (25.7 km)
- Location: Snohomish County, Washington
- Use: Non-motorized use
- Surface: Paved
- Maintained by: Local administration per section

The Interurban Trail is a rail trail in Snohomish County, Washington. It is a hard-surfaced, non-motorized trail located on the Pacific Northwest Traction right-of-way, a route used until 1939 by the Interurban Railroad between Seattle and Bellingham. The trail in Snohomish County runs over 16 miles (26 km).

== Route ==
From north to south, the trail takes the following route:

- From Pacific Avenue, south on Colby Avenue;
- At 43rd Street, shifting east to hard-surfaced right-of-way south.
- Merge with paved roadway to Broadway.
- Broadway south to Highway 526;
- At Highway 526, shifting west, crossing highway, following West Mall Drive south;
- At 112th Street, right-of-way parallels Interstate 5 on west side;
- At 128th Street, crosses Interstate 5 overpass and parallels freeway on east side;
- At 160th Place, heads east, then south on 13th Avenue;
- At 169th Drive, heads west, then parallels Interstate 5 south;
- At Maple Road, crosses Interstate 5, then south crossing Highway 525 to Alderwood Mall Boulevard;
- Parallels Interstate 5 with brief local road detours to 44th Ave;
- Follows right-of-way west to South Lynnwood Neighborhood Park;
- Follows local roads to 212th Street.
- At 212th Street, shifting east to right-of way;
- Crosses 228th Street and connects to 74th Avenue.
- Follows 74th Avenue and right-of-way south to 76th Avenue at Ballinger Station.
- Follows 76th Avenue south to county line, joins with Interurban Trail (King County).

== History ==
In 1910, The Seattle-Everett Interurban Railway began electric passenger service. After the railway was abandoned in 1939, it was converted to a power line corridor. In the 1990s, the right-of-way was opened to pedestrian and bicycle traffic.

Interurban Car 55 is a restored trolley from this route, and is located at Heritage Park, east of Interstate 5 on Poplar Way in Lynnwood next to The Wickers Building, which is now the Transportation Museum. The building was originally located along the rail line and includes an exhibit on its history.

=== Administration ===
The trail is administered in three sections - Snohomish County, Everett, and Lynnwood. The Snohomish County PUD administers the section from Everett to Lynnwood. From 212th Street SW to 228th Street SW is administered by Mountlake Terrace, and the remainder to the King County Line is administered by the city of Edmonds.

== Future alignments ==
On the northern portion of the trail, an overpass over Interstate 5 near 128th Street and an extension into downtown Everett was proposed.
