= Westlake station (Sound Transit) =

Light rail station in Seattle, Washington

50 Westlake
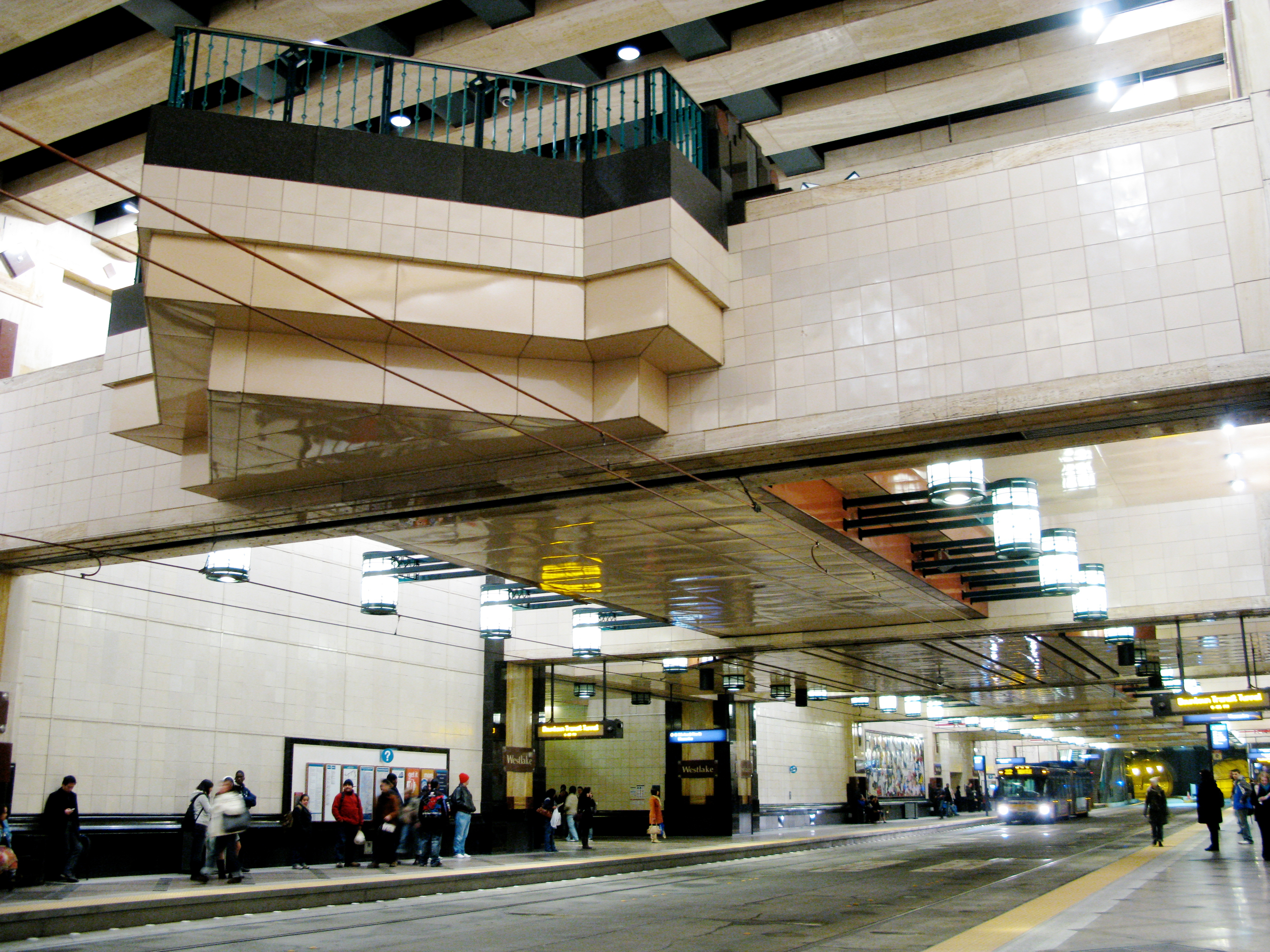
- The Westlake station mezzanine, seen from the platform level

General information
- Location: Pine Street & 4th Avenue; Seattle, Washington; United States
- Coordinates: 47°36′41″N 122°20′14″W
- System: Link light rail
- Owner: Sound Transit
- Platforms: 2 side platforms
- Tracks: 2
- Connections: Seattle Center Monorail; South Lake Union Streetcar; King County Metro; Sound Transit Express

Construction
- Structure type: Underground
- Parking: Paid parking nearby
- Accessible: Yes

History
- Opened: September 15, 1990
- Rebuilt: 2005–2007

Passengers
- 12,548 daily weekday boardings (2025); 4,404,499 total boardings (2025)

Services
Preceding station	Sound Transit	Following station
Link
Capitol Hill toward Lynnwood City Center	1 Line	Symphony toward Federal Way Downtown
Capitol Hill toward Lynnwood City Center	2 Line	Symphony toward Downtown Redmond
Preceding station	Seattle Streetcar	Following station
Terminus	South Lake Union Streetcar transfer at Westlake Hub	Westlake & 7th toward Fairview & Campus Drive
Future service
Preceding station	Sound Transit	Following station
Link
Denny toward Ballard	1 Line Ballard Extension (2039)	Midtown toward Tacoma Dome
Former services
Preceding station	Sound Transit	Following station
ST Express
Convention Place toward Downtown Seattle	Route 550	Symphony toward Bellevue Transit Center
Location

Westlake station is a light rail and former bus station that is part of the Downtown Seattle Transit Tunnel in Seattle, Washington, United States. The station is located under Pine Street between 3rd and 6th avenues in Downtown Seattle, near Westlake Center and Westlake Park. It is served by the 1 Line and 2 Line, both part of Sound Transit's Link light rail system, and also connected above ground by buses at several stops, the South Lake Union Streetcar, and the Seattle Center Monorail.

Westlake station consists of two underground side platforms, connected to the surface by entrances and a mezzanine level served by nearby department stores. It is situated between Symphony station to the south, and the former Convention Place station to the north; Convention Place was only served by buses, however, and Capitol Hill station is the next northbound light rail station. The transit tunnel was built in the 1980s by King County Metro and opened for bus-only service on September 15, 1990. The tunnel was closed from 2005 to 2007 for a major renovation to prepare for light rail service, which began on July 18, 2009.

Link light rail trains terminated at Westlake until the opening of the University Link Extension on March 19, 2016; the tunnel became train-only in March 2019. Trains serve the station twenty hours a day on most days; the headway between light rail trains is six minutes during peak periods, with less frequent service at other times. A second downtown tunnel is planned to be built in 2030, with a transfer at Westlake station for traffic continuing towards South Lake Union and Ballard.

== Location ==
Westlake station is located on Pine Street between 3rd and 6th avenues in Downtown Seattle's retail and office district. The station is at the north end of Downtown Seattle, near the Denny Triangle area, and is within walking distance of the Pike Place Market Historic District. According to the Puget Sound Regional Council, the area within 1/2 mile (0.8 km) of the station has an estimated population of 15,171 people (in 12,995 total housing units, mostly in multifamily buildings) and approximately 91,055 jobs.

The station and its entrances are adjacent to the Westlake Center shopping mall, Westlake Park, Pacific Place, the Nordstrom flagship store, and the former regional flagship of Macy's (formerly The Bon Marché). Pike Place Market is located to the west of the station, while the Seattle Convention Center is four blocks to the east. Amazon is headquartered several blocks north of the station in the Denny Triangle area.

== History ==
=== Background and earlier proposals ===
The Pine Street area of Downtown Seattle was regraded for development from 1903 to 1906, as part of the citywide regrading program. The newly regraded area was part of urban planner Virgil Bogue's 1911 comprehensive plan for Seattle, envisioning a civic center to the north and several subway lines converging at the intersection of Pine Street and 3rd Avenue. The subway lines would continue outwards to serve the civic center, Capitol Hill, Downtown (modern-day Pioneer Square), and the waterfront; the stations would also include additional entrances from within department stores and other large buildings. The plan was rejected by voters on March 5, 1912, and a 3rd Avenue subway passing through the area was unsuccessfully proposed twice in the 1920s.

The regraded area was developed into the city's retailing neighborhood in the 1920s, with the construction of large department stores for The Bon Marché, Frederick & Nelson, and Nordstrom on Pine Street between 3rd and 6th avenues. A second major rapid transit plan was proposed by the Forward Thrust Committee in the 1960s, to be built by 1985, and was put before voters. It called for a subway station on 3rd Avenue between Pine and Pike streets, designed with underground connections to major stores, would be served by two routes continuing north to Ballard (via Lower Queen Anne) and Lake City (via Capitol Hill and the University District). The ballot measure required a supermajority to support bonding to augment $385 million in local funding with $765 million from the Urban Mass Transportation Administration, but failed to reach the 60 percent threshold in 1968; a second attempt in 1970 yielded the same result, ending the planned system. The failure of the Forward Thrust ballot measures led to the creation of Metro Transit in 1972, who were tasked with operating bus service across King County and planning for a regional rapid transit system.

=== Bus tunnel ===
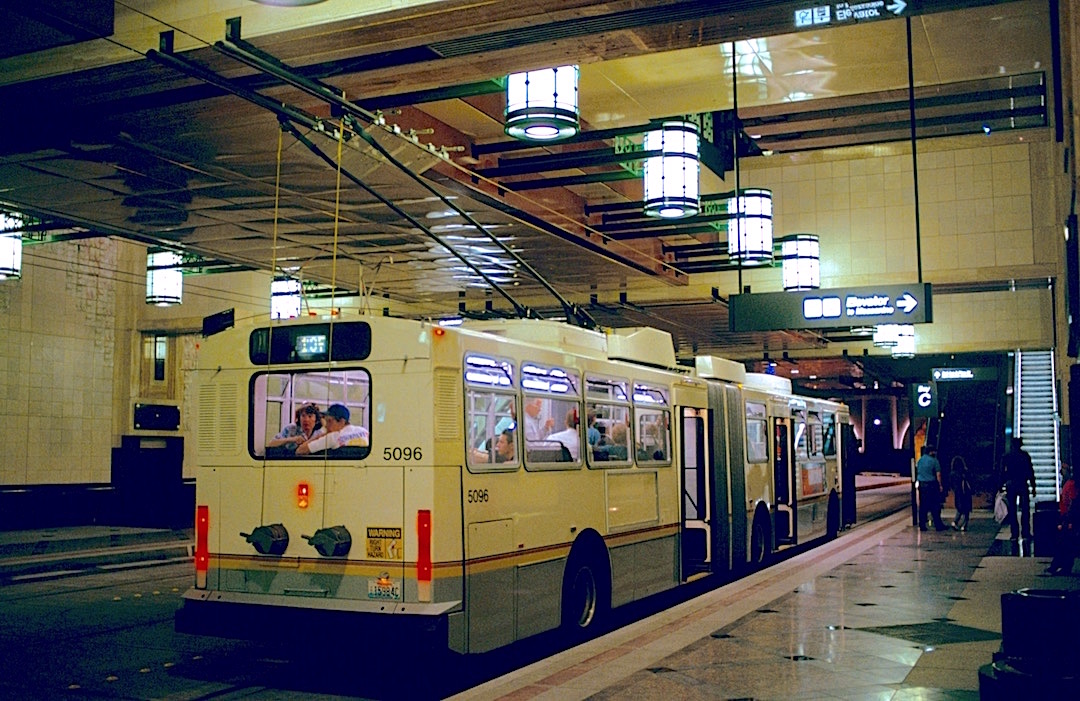
A dual-mode bus on route 107 at Westlake station just after the station opened, in 1990

Metro Transit began planning a bus-based transit system through downtown Seattle in the 1970s, including a transit mall, tunnel, or bus terminal in the Westlake area. Metro approved construction of a downtown bus tunnel in 1983, selecting Pine Street and 4th Avenue as the site of one of the stations. The station would be integrated with a planned shopping mall on Pine Street, with underground walkways connecting to nearby department stores.

The Pine Street segment of the tunnel would be dug cut-and-cover and require a long-term closure of the street between 4th Avenue and 9th Avenue. SCI Contractors of Calgary was awarded the $74.5 million contract for the Pine Street segment, including the construction of Westlake and Convention Place stations, in February 1987. On April 27, 1987, Pine Street was closed to non-bus traffic, and construction of Westlake station's 400 pilings and outer walls began. Excavation of the tunnel on Pine Street was completed in late August, allowing for concrete pouring to begin. Pine Street was briefly re-opened for the Christmas shopping season, from November 2 to January 4, at the request of downtown merchants; the excavated tunnel was backfilled and given a temporary surface for automobile traffic. A pair of tunnel boring machines arrived at Westlake station in the spring of 1988 after completing the 3rd Avenue segment of the bus tunnel; the machines were partially salvaged, leaving the outer shells in place to form part of the tunnel walls. Pine Street was re-opened to traffic on November 1, 1988, coinciding with the opening of Westlake Center and Westlake Park. Excavation and concrete pouring in Westlake station were completed in December 1988, leaving major work on the mezzanine level left to finish.

Westlake station, along with Pioneer Square station, was at the center of a controversy during its construction due to the use of granite from South Africa, then under a Metro boycott against Apartheid rule. After the granite's origins were discovered, the materials were returned and Metro's executive director resigned as a result of the incident. Metro also had to return shipments of terra cotta tiles that were delivered warped, in the wrong size, and in the wrong color; the planned terra cotta ceiling for the station was instead replaced with a travertine limestone. During construction in early 1989, approximately 20 workers were sickened by fumes and foul air inside the station. Air quality tests conducted in the tunnel could not identify the cause of the bad air, leading Metro to install scrubbers to help control diesel exhaust from equipment.

The Westlake station mezzanine was opened on August 11, 1989, as part of a public preview of the tunnel. The station's design was praised by local politicians and visitors, with Seattle City Councilman George Benson noting that it had "an element of class that is new to Seattle". The mezzanine remained open for several weeks, allowing for access between the basement levels of downtown retailers, but closed until November for additional construction. Additional fire sprinklers were installed in Westlake station to accommodate parties and receptions, as the station's mezzanine became sought as an events venue. Tunnel construction was completed in June 1990, and bus service began on September 15, 1990. Between 1990 and 2004, all service in the tunnel was operated by custom-built dual-mode buses, which operated on diesel fuel outside the tunnel and electrically as trolleybuses (via overhead wires) inside the tunnel.

=== Light rail ===
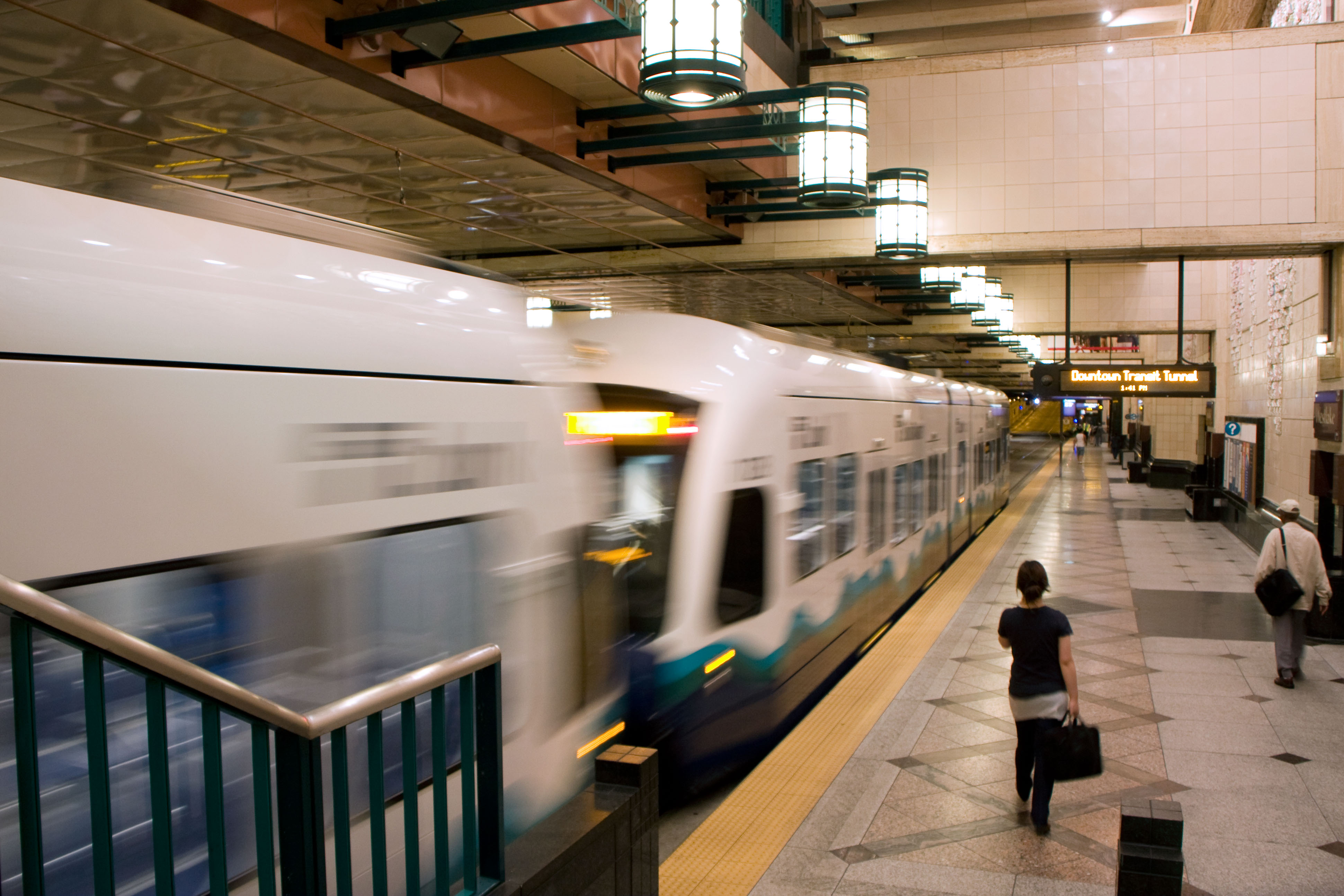
A Link light rail train arriving at Westlake station

In the early 1990s, a regional transit authority (RTA) was formed to plan and construct a light rail system for the Seattle area. After an unsuccessful attempt in 1995, regional voters passed a $3.9 billion plan to build light rail under the RTA in 1996. The downtown transit tunnel had already been planned for eventual light rail use and was built with tracks that would be incorporated into the initial system. The RTA, later renamed Sound Transit, approved the tunnel as part of the route of its initial light rail line in 1999, with plans to eventually add new surface entrances to serve the Washington State Convention Center in lieu of a Convention Place light rail station. Ownership of the tunnel, including its stations, was transferred to Sound Transit in 2000 but returned two years later to King County Metro under a joint-operations agreement.

The downtown transit tunnel was closed on September 23, 2005, for an $82.7 million renovation to accommodate light rail vehicles. The two-year renovation included the installation of new rails, a lowered roadbed at stations for level boarding, new signalling systems and emergency ventilation. As part of the renovation, a short cut-and-cover "stub tunnel" was built under Pine Street between Westlake station and Interstate 5, forming a turnback area for trains and part of the light rail system's planned northern extension. The tunnel reopened on September 24, 2007, with new signage, lighting, and street improvements; Westlake station was host to a public open house for the planned light rail system, featuring a light rail vehicle on display at the station prior to the re-opening of the tunnel.

Link light rail service began on July 18, 2009, running from Westlake station to Tukwila International Boulevard station. A tunneled extension of the light rail system, from Westlake to stations at Capitol Hill and University of Washington, was excavated from 2011 to 2012. The northern extension opened on March 19, 2016, moving the line's northern terminus to University of Washington station.

Bus service within the downtown transit tunnel ceased on March 23, 2019, due to the expansion of the Washington State Convention Center at the former site of Convention Place station. Westlake station became exclusively served by light rail trains, which were planned to increase in frequency when the Northgate extension opens in 2021. The Metro Customer Shop at Westlake station was also closed on March 6, 2019, ahead of the planned handover of tunnel operations to Sound Transit, and is planned to be replaced by another kiosk. Sound Transit assumed full ownership of the tunnel in 2022.

On April 27, 2023, the station ceiling was punctured by a construction crew working on the relocation of a historic street clock on Pine Street and forced the northbound platform to close. Contractors working on an existing clock foundation drilled 48 inches (120 cm) through the station roof and broke part of a structural girder over the northbound tracks. Sound Transit announced that an investigation into the damage would take two weeks and cause major disruptions to 1 Line service. The section between Capitol Hill and Stadium stations was initially reduced to a single shuttle train that will run every 32 minutes while the rest of the line runs every 15 minutes. Sound Transit later adjusted the temporary schedule to use alternating trains every 15 to 20 minutes that required a single transfer at Pioneer Square station due to a lack of shuttle buses. Regular service resumed on May 7 with the reopened northbound platform while repairs were conducted.

The 2 Line entered simulated service on February 14, 2026, with passengers able to board trains from Lynnwood to International District/Chinatown station.

=== Future ===
As part of the Sound Transit 3 program, approved by voters in 2016, Westlake station is planned to become a transfer station for a new downtown light rail tunnel to be built as part of the Ballard Link Extension project. The tunnel would serve a rerouted 1 Line that continues through South Lake Union, Lower Queen Anne, and Ballard. The new downtown light rail tunnel would travel south near 5th Avenue to International District/Chinatown station, merging with the current line. Under the preferred alternative in 2022, the new tunnel would have a station under 5th Avenue between Pine and Pike streets that is 135 feet (41 m) below street level. Additional entrances to both the existing and future station platforms would be built around Westlake Park. The Ballard Link Extension is scheduled to begin construction in 2032 and open between the Seattle Center and SoDo by 2042.

== Station layout ==
The mezzanine level of Westlake station with a view of the platforms below

Westlake station is situated below Pine Street between 4th and 6th avenues in Downtown Seattle. The station consists of two side platforms, a mezzanine level, and entrances from the surface; all three levels are connected by a series of seven elevators, sixteen escalators, and stairs. The 500-foot-long (150 m) mezzanine spans the length of the station, unlike other downtown tunnel stations, and includes an entrance to the basement level of the Westlake Center. Additional entrances led to the basement levels of nearby department stores Nordstrom, Nordstrom Rack, Macy's (formerly The Bon Marché), and Coldwater Creek. The mezzanine also has ticket vending machines that issue ORCA cards, and was formerly home to the King County Metro Customer Shop, which was located at the west end of the station. The non-retail entrances to Westlake station are located on both sides of Pine Street between 3rd and 4th avenues, and on the north side of Pine Street between 5th and 6th avenues. There is also a direct elevator from the mezzanine level to the Seattle Center Monorail terminus at Westlake Center. The platform level at Westlake station is 50 to 60 feet (15 to 18 m) below street level, while the mezzanine is 20 feet (6 m) below street level.

=== Art and architecture ===
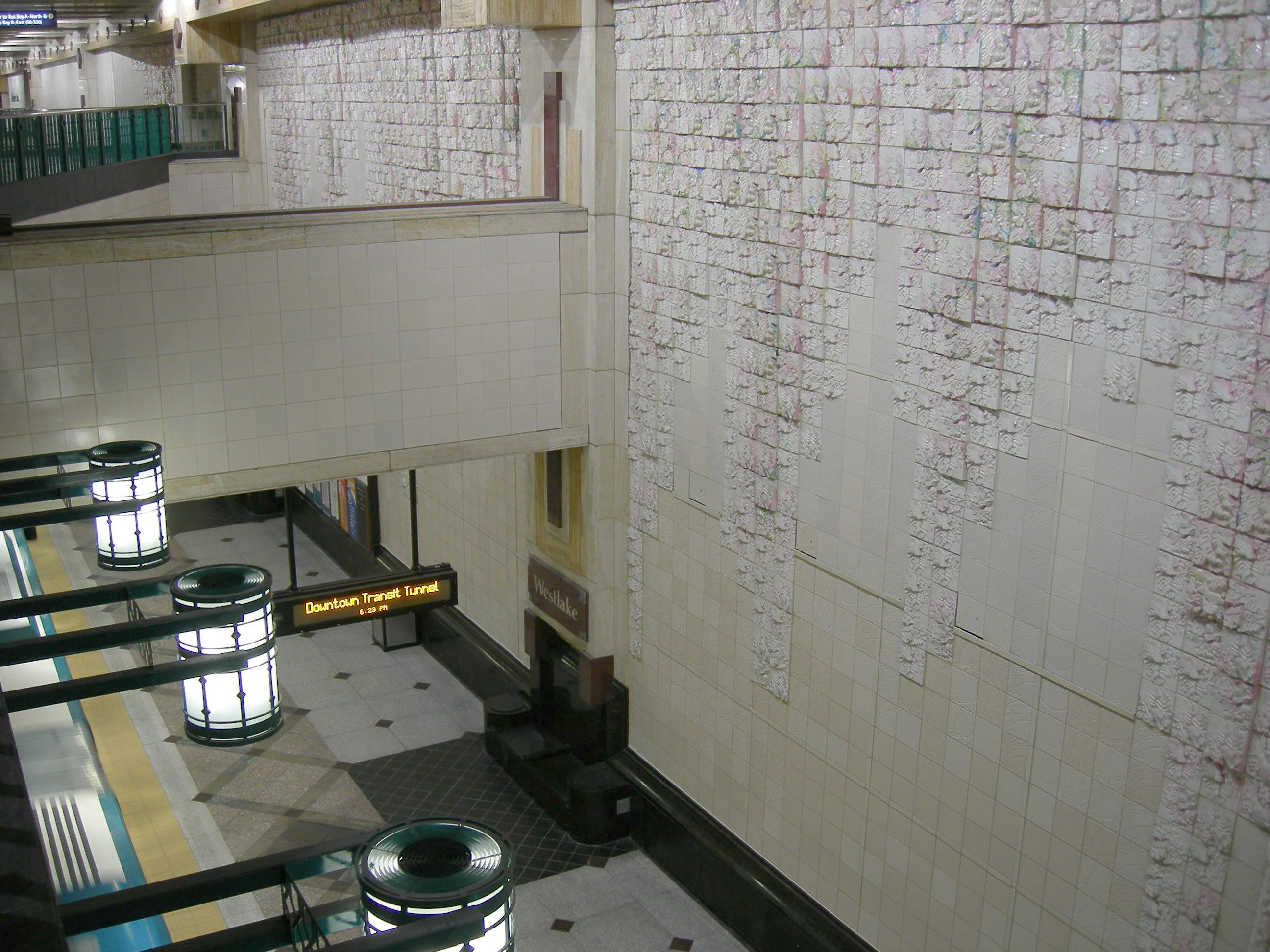
Terra cotta artwork on the south wall of Westlake station, seen from the mezzanine level

Westlake station was designed by Brent Carlson of TRA Architects to "give the impression" of a retail center's liveliness, and features heavy use of granite materials and Art Deco design elements. The station is also adorned with public artwork as part of the tunnel's $1.5 million art program, under the direction of lead artist Jack Mackie and program director Vicki Scuri.

The south station wall has a collection of 1,264 handmade terra cotta tiles carved in the shapes of leaves, vines, and flowers; the tiles, designed by Mackie, are arranged from the mezzanine level downwards, as if forming the roots of Westlake Park above. Between the mezzanine and platform, Scuri's 40 ceramic tiles feature geometric patterns found in clothing and other garments. The station's stairways and surface entrances are inscribed with quotes from University of Washington professor Caroline Ober, artist Mark Tobey, and retailer Silas Munro. On the corner of Pine Street and 5th Avenue was a 17-foot-high (5.2 m) granite street clock shaped like a question mark, designed by artist Bill Whipple; it is planned to be relocated in 2023 to Pike Street and 4th Avenue as part of a swap with a historic Ben Bridge Jeweler clock.

The platform level houses three 35-foot-long (11 m), 10-foot-tall (3 m) porcelain enamel murals by Seattle artists Fay Jones, Gene Gentry McMahon, and Roger Shimomura. Jones's mural is an interpretation of Seattle's place as a port city, using bright colors to "bring sunshine underground"; McMahon's mural depicts the "glamour" of shopping, with "larger than life" figures against the Seattle skyline and a beach; and Shimomura's mural is a collage of American pop culture figures, including the likes of Marilyn Monroe, Alice in Wonderland, and Donald Duck, intermixed with imagery from East Asian cultures, including a samurai and geisha, in a celebration of the city's cultural diversity.

The station's former pictogram, a tiara, represents the neighborhood's "playful nature". It was created in 2009 by Christian French as part of the Stellar Connections series and its points represented nearby destinations, including Pike Place Market, Victor Steinbrueck Park, the Paramount Theatre, and the Washington State Convention Center. The pictogram series was retired in 2024 and replaced by station numbers, with Westlake assigned number "50" as the system's center point.

== Services ==
Westlake is one of four stations in the Downtown Seattle Transit Tunnel, which is served by the Link light rail system's 1 Line and 2 Line. It is situated between Capitol Hill and Symphony stations; it is the ninth southbound station from Lynnwood City Center, the terminus of both lines. Link light rail trains serve Westlake station 20 hours a day on weekdays and Saturdays, from 5:00 a.m. to 12:00 a.m.; and 18 hours on Sundays, from 6:00 a.m. to 12:00 a.m. During regular weekday service, trains on each line operate roughly every eight minutes during rush hour, ten minutes during midday operation, and twelve to fifteen minutes in the early morning and at night. On weekends, trains on each line arrive at Westlake station every ten minutes during midday hours and every twelve to fifteen minutes during mornings and evenings. The two lines combine for frequencies of four minutes during rush hour and five minutes during midday and weekend service. The station is approximately 32 minutes from Lynnwood City Center station, 27 minutes from Bellevue Downtown station, and 50 minutes from SeaTac/Airport station. In 2025, an average of 12,548 passengers boarded Link trains at Westlake station on weekdays; it is the busiest station in the Link light rail system with over 4.4 million total boardings.

In addition to light rail, Westlake station is in close proximity to several other regional and local transit services. The Seattle Center Monorail, serving the Seattle Center and Space Needle, terminates at a station located on the third floor of the Westlake Center shopping mall, connected directly to the tunnel station via an elevator and stairway. The South Lake Union Streetcar terminates one block north of the station at McGraw Square, continuing to the South Lake Union neighborhood. Westlake station is also adjacent to several surface bus stops, served by King County Metro and Sound Transit Express routes that connect to other Seattle neighborhoods and outlying areas. Bus stops on Pine and Pike streets serve local routes headed east to Capitol Hill, Montlake, and Madison Park. Bus stops on 3rd Avenue serve RapidRide lines and local routes heading north to Ballard, Fremont, and South Lake Union, and south towards West Seattle, the Rainier Valley, and SoDo. Bus stops on 2nd Avenue, 4th Avenue, 5th Avenue, Olive Way, and Stewart Street serve regional express routes to Snohomish County, the Eastside, southern King County, and Pierce County. King County Metro operates a special route between all Link stations during service disruptions, stopping at Pine Street and 5th Avenue to serve Westlake station.

From 2009 to 2019, several bus routes also ran in the tunnel alongside Link light rail. The final set of bus routes in the tunnel were divided into three bays by their outbound direction: Bay A was served by three routes (routes 41, 74, and 255) heading north toward Northgate and the University District and east towards Kirkland; Bay C was served by three routes (routes 101, 102, and 150) heading south through the SODO Busway toward Kent and Renton; and Bay D was served by one route (Sound Transit Express route 550) heading east via Interstate 90 to Bellevue. Bay A was located on the northbound platform, while Bays C and D shared the southbound platform. The bus routes were relocated in March 2019 to new stops around the Westlake station area on various streets.
