= University of Washington station =

Light rail station in Seattle, Washington

48 University of Washington
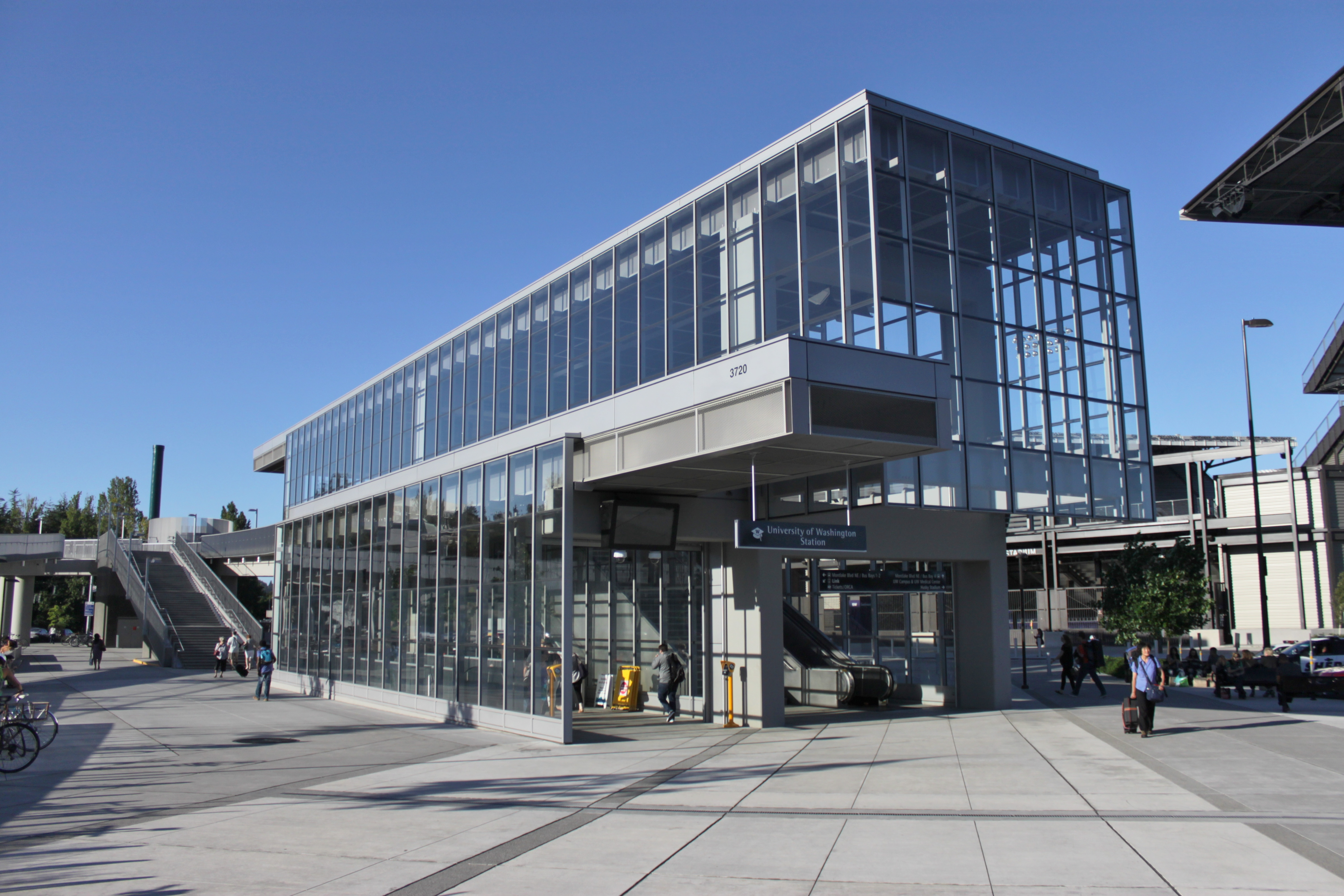
- The station's surface entrance, viewed from the southwest

General information
- Location: 3720 Montlake Boulevard Northeast; Seattle, Washington; United States
- Coordinates: 47°38′59″N 122°18′14″W
- System: Link light rail
- Owner: Sound Transit
- Platforms: 1 island platform
- Tracks: 2
- Connections: King County Metro; Sound Transit Express

Construction
- Structure type: Underground
- Depth: 95 ft (29 m)
- Parking: Paid parking nearby
- Cycle facilities: Racks
- Accessible: Yes

History
- Opened: March 19, 2016

Passengers
- 5,827 daily weekday boardings (2025); 1,836,758 total boardings (2025)

Services
Preceding station	Sound Transit	Following station
Link
U District toward Lynnwood City Center	1 Line	Capitol Hill toward Federal Way Downtown
U District toward Lynnwood City Center	2 Line	Capitol Hill toward Downtown Redmond
Location

University of Washington is a light rail station on the University of Washington campus in Seattle, Washington, United States. The station is served by the 1 Line and 2 Line of Sound Transit's Link light rail system, which connect Seattle to suburban areas. University of Washington station is at the intersection of Montlake Boulevard Northeast and Northeast Pacific Street, adjacent to Husky Stadium and the University of Washington Medical Center.

The station consists of an underground island platform connected to a surface entrance by elevators and escalators. A pedestrian bridge over Montlake Boulevard connects the station to the University of Washington campus and the Burke-Gilman Trail. University of Washington station was built as part of the University Link Extension, which began construction in 2009 and opened on March 19, 2016. The station was the northern terminus of the 1 Line until the opening of the Northgate Link Extension on October 2, 2021.

Light rail trains serve the station twenty hours a day on most days; the headway between trains is six minutes during peak periods with reduced frequency at other times. The station is served by a major bus hub; King County Metro and Sound Transit Express bus routes connect the University District to the Eastside region.

== Location ==
University of Washington station is located at the intersection of Montlake Boulevard Northeast and Northeast Pacific Street in the University District of northern Seattle. The station is situated in the parking lot of Husky Stadium, immediately east of the University of Washington Medical Center. To the northwest is the University of Washington campus, which is accessible via the Rainier Vista bridge, the Burke-Gilman Trail, and Northeast Pacific Street.

The surrounding area accommodates 15,511 jobs, constituting one of the Seattle region's major employment centers, as well as 488 residents in Montlake to the south. The station is connected to the Montlake neighborhood by the Montlake Bridge, which carries Montlake Boulevard towards a junction with State Route 520, a major east–west freeway connecting Seattle to the Eastside suburbs. The station is one mile (1.6 km) south of the University Village shopping center and two miles (3.2 km) southwest of Seattle Children's Hospital. The University of Washington has long-term plans to redevelop its parking lots along Montlake Boulevard into additional office and classroom space, forming the new "East Campus" area.

== History ==
=== Background and planning ===
The University of Washington moved from its downtown campus to the north side of Portage Bay in 1895, later expanding during the Alaska–Yukon–Pacific Exposition of 1909 that was hosted at the site. In 1911, urban planner Virgil Bogue's rejected comprehensive plan for Seattle envisioned a citywide subway system, including a line serving the east side of the university campus and connected to Ravenna and eastern Capitol Hill. The Forward Thrust Committee's planned regional rapid transit system, which was rejected by voters in 1968 and 1970, included a subway station at the University Hospital near Husky Stadium, from where trains would continue south through Capitol Hill to Downtown Seattle. A 1986 regional transit plan from the Puget Sound Council of Governments proposed a light rail line through the University District, including a station at the University Hospital, continuing through Eastlake to Downtown Seattle.

In the 1990s, a regional transit authority—later Sound Transit—was formed to build a light rail system for the Seattle metropolitan area. The University District was named as a major destination for the system and given two stations at NE Pacific Street and NE 45th Street on the western side of the university campus, which would be connected to Downtown Seattle via a tunnel under Capitol Hill. The $6.7 billion proposal, including a light rail line continuing north from the University District to Northgate and Lynnwood, was rejected by voters in 1995 and replaced with a smaller plan. In November 1996, voters approved a condensed $3.9-billion regional transit plan that included a shorter light rail line from the University District to Downtown Seattle and SeaTac. A surface alignment through Eastlake was also proposed in the event boring a tunnel through Capitol Hill and under Portage Bay would be too expensive. Sound Transit finalized its preferred alignment for the light rail project, which included stations at NE Pacific Street and NE 45th Street, in 1999.

Sound Transit suspended planning for the Portage Bay tunnel in 2000 after it received construction bids that were $171 million higher than expected, blamed on a competitive labor market and soil testing that indicated that a deeper tunnel was needed. Faced with budget issues and further schedule delays, Sound Transit deferred construction of the segment between Downtown Seattle and the University District in 2001 while re-evaluating alignment options. The alternatives were narrowed to two options in early 2002: a tunnel below the Ship Canal at University Bridge with a single station at Northeast 45th Street; and a tunnel under the Montlake Cut and stations near Husky Stadium and at Northeast 45th Street. A Sound Transit study determined the Montlake route was the most cost-effective, and the University of Washington endorsed it as the least disruptive to its research buildings. In 2004, the Sound Transit Board confirmed this route, including an underground station at Husky Stadium with a subterranean pedestrian connection to the campus, as the new preferred alignment for the Link light rail project. The $1.9 billion University Link project, with the Husky Stadium station as the northern terminus, received final approval from Sound Transit and the Federal Transit Administration (FTA) in 2006.

Under the plan approved in 2006, the Husky Stadium station would have three entrances connected via underground walkways or overpasses: on the east side of Montlake Boulevard adjacent to the stadium; on the north side of Pacific Place on the Burke-Gilman Trail; and on the west side of Montlake Boulevard near the University of Washington Medical Center. In 2007, the Seattle Design Commission recommended an overpass to cross Montlake Boulevard in lieu of the underground walkway, and Sound Transit updated the station's design plan accordingly, adding a bridge on the north side of the Montlake Triangle across from Rainier Vista. The University of Washington unveiled its plans to redevelop the Montlake Triangle into a landscaped park with a land bridge over Pacific Place, and requested Sound Transit to connect the station through a mid-block crosswalk instead of the bridge. The FTA rejected the mid-block crosswalk and a compromise pedestrian overpass connecting to the center of the Montlake Triangle from Rainier Vista was adopted in 2011.

The station was named "University of Washington" in 2012, leading to confusion with the existing University Street station in Downtown Seattle and the future U District station that would open west of the campus in 2021. Other suggested names included Montlake, Husky Stadium, and UW Medical Center. In 2015, the Washington House of Representatives passed a transportation package with language that ordered Sound Transit to consider naming the station for state senator Scott White, who died in office.

=== Construction and opening ===
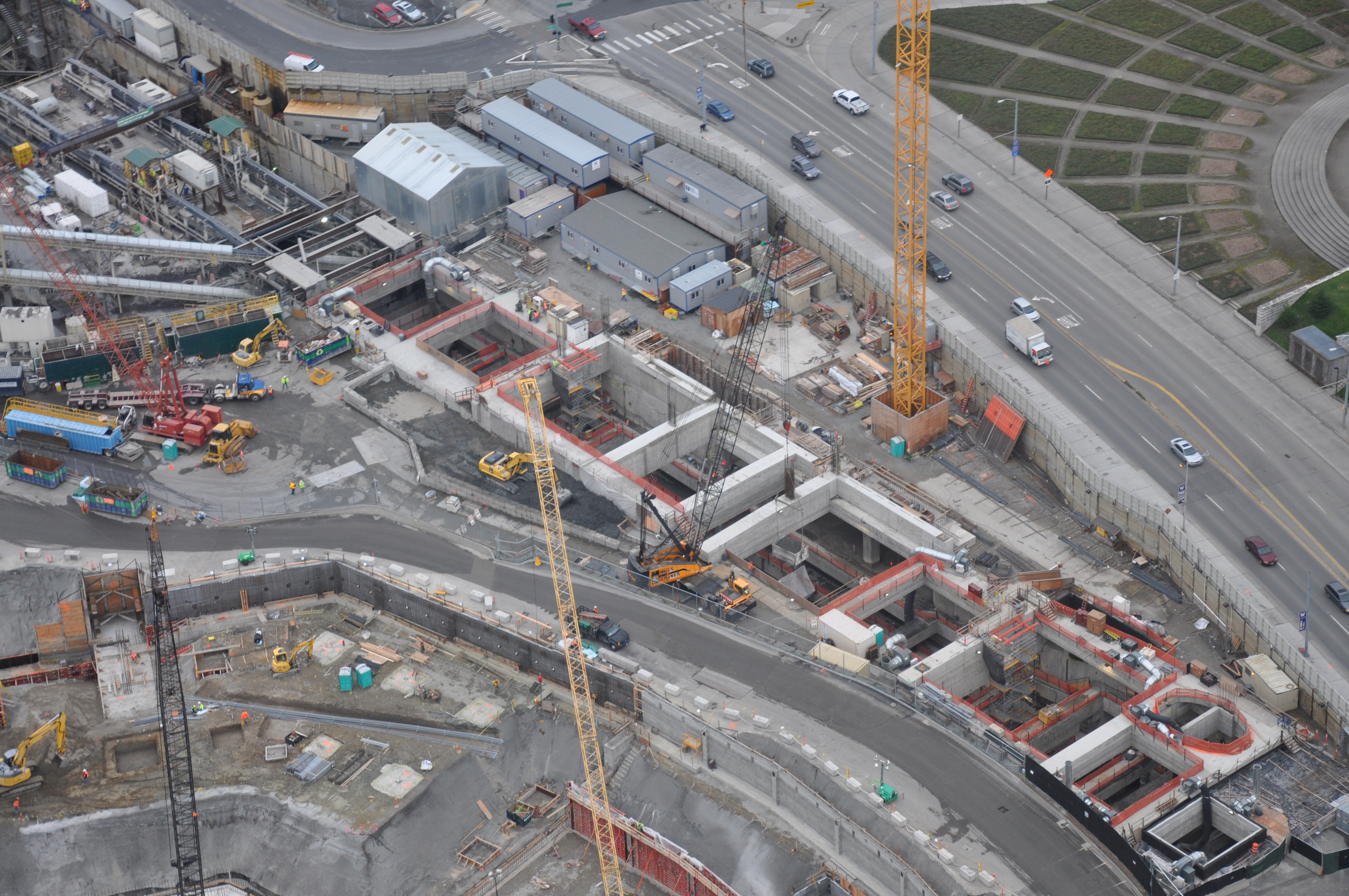
Excavation of the University of Washington station box, seen from above in February 2012

The University Link project received an $813 million grant from the federal government in January 2009, allowing it to move towards final design and construction. A groundbreaking ceremony was held at the future University of Washington station on March 6, 2009, marking the start of construction. Utility relocation and site preparation at the station, consisting of the demolition and replacement of facilities at Husky Stadium—including two ticket offices, a concessions kitchen, and restrooms—had begun in February and continued until August. A new access road around Husky Stadium was built and part of the stadium's parking lot was closed and fenced off in early 2010.

Excavation of the station box, along with shoring installation and jet grouting of the soil, began in June 2010. The platform level, at a depth of 100 feet (30 m), was reached in late February 2011, allowing concrete pouring to commence. The project's two tunnel boring machines arrived at University of Washington station for assembly in April 2011 and were dedicated by local and state politicians on May 16. The tunnel boring machines were launched in June and July towards Capitol Hill station, arriving in spring 2012. Station box excavation was completed in June 2012, and contractors Hoffman Construction Company moved on to steel erection and pouring of the station's upper levels.

Station construction reached street level in late 2012, and structural elements of the headhouse and Montlake Boulevard overpass were installed. The station's basic structure was finished in early 2014, and landscaping and road access around the entrance was restored while finishing work continued underground. The station and overpass were declared substantially complete in November 2014, while work above ground continued. The University of Washington completed work on the Montlake Triangle in July 2015, and the Montlake Boulevard overpass opened to the public later that month.

Capitol Hill and University of Washington stations opened on March 19, 2016, during a community celebration that attracted 67,000 people; the two stations opened six months ahead of schedule. The following week, several bus routes in Northeast Seattle were redirected to feed the new station as part of a major restructuring of service brought on by the cancellation of downtown express routes from the University District. By the end of the year, the station was averaging 9,300 daily boardings, placing it second among Link stations for ridership behind Westlake.

Buses from the Eastside area using State Route 520 were redirected to the station beginning in March 2019 as part of a restructure of downtown bus service before the downtown transit tunnel was closed to buses. A new set of bus stops and dedicated bus lanes on the east side of Montlake Boulevard were built to serve the redirected routes. University of Washington station served as the northern terminus of the 1 Line until October 2, 2021, when an extension to Northgate station opened. Tunnel boring from U District station, located northwest of the university campus, was completed in September 2016. The 2 Line entered simulated service on February 14, 2026, with passengers able to board trains from Lynnwood to International District/Chinatown station.

=== Incidents ===
The station has had long-term escalator outages that began soon after it was opened, blamed on components failing prematurely. In one incident on March 16, 2018, both of the station's down escalators were broken for three hours, forcing passengers to queue for the elevators. The incident prompted Sound Transit to change their escalator protocol in April, allowing passengers to temporarily use the shut-off escalators as stairs and opening emergency stairways. The downward escalators failed again for an hour on April 27, during which the new escalator protocol was used to allow access to the emergency stairways. In October 2018, Sound Transit approved a $20 million contract to replace the station's 13 escalators, open one set of stairs to the public, and build a connection between the two sub-mezzanines above the platform. The escalator replacement plan was later cancelled in October 2020 following improved performance due to preventative maintenance under a new contractor.

A northbound train leaving University of Washington station after an Apple Cup football game in November 2021 lost power in the tunnel after it struck a protruding metal rod. Passengers aboard the train forced the doors open and walked down to emergency exits due to a lack of clear communication before a rescue train was able to arrive. Sound Transit announced changes to its procedures as a result of the incident. On September 17, 2024, a bent pantograph on a train damaged the overhead wire over the northbound track at the station and caused a stall that was not removed for the remainder of the day. Northbound trains have been limited to 10 miles per hour (16 km/h) on approach or departure from University of Washington station to prevent further damage to the wires, which was originally scheduled to be repaired in December. The slow order added an extra two minutes of travel time to Link trains through the area. The repair was delayed to February 2025 due to ongoing signaling issues that could have potentially disrupted the limited train schedule during reduced service.

A Series 1 train with an open rooftop hatch damaged the overhead wire on the northbound tracks at the station, resulting in a stall and 15 hours of service disruptions. Trains were unable to serve the Capitol Hill–Northgate sections of both lines.

== Station layout ==
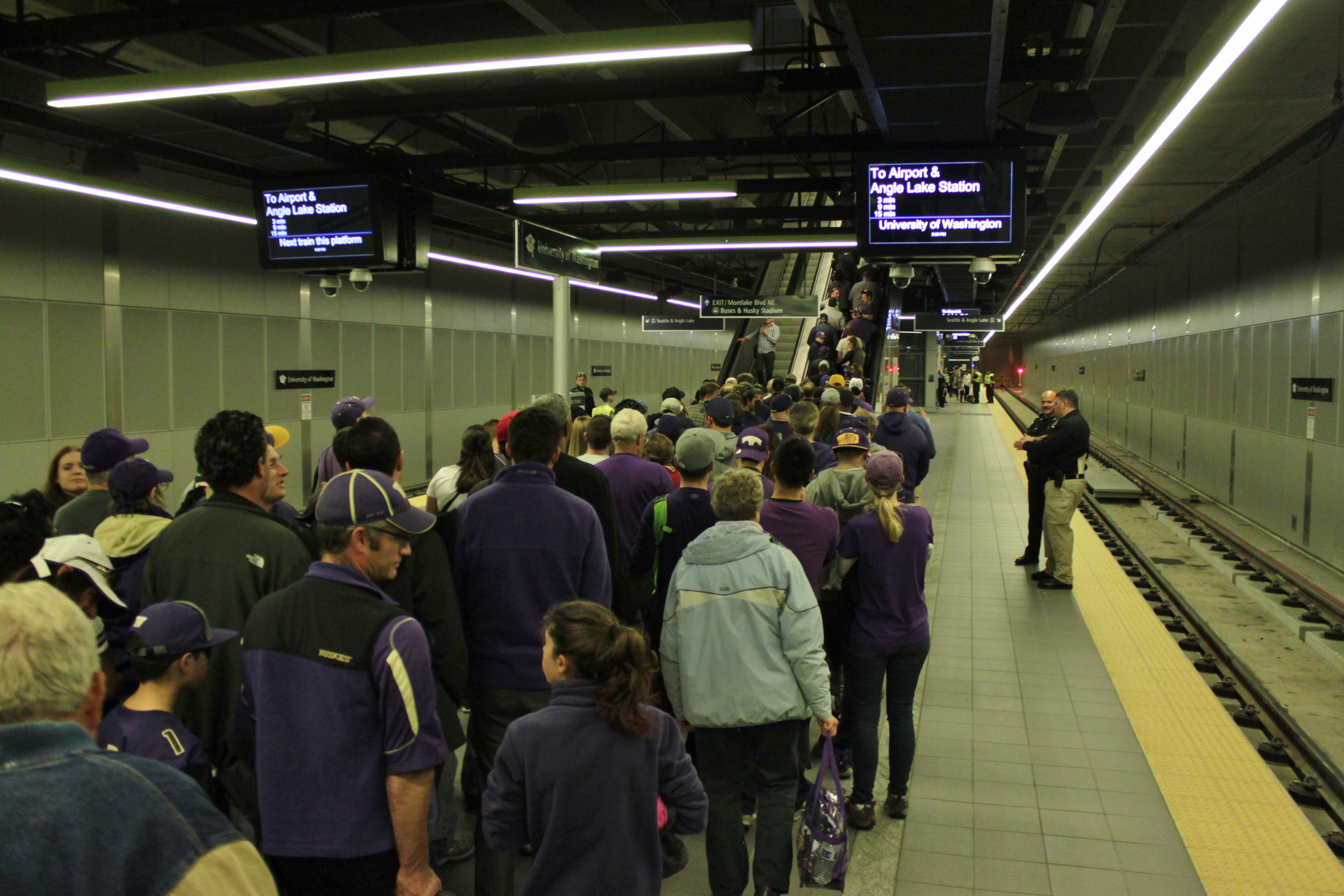
The platform level at University of Washington station before a Huskies football game

University of Washington station consists of a single, 380-foot-long (120 m) island platform located 95 feet (29 m) below street level. The station has a stated platform capacity of 1,600 people; it was designed to accommodate large crowds attending Husky Stadium events. The station has a 55-foot (17 m) open mezzanine that is split between two stories and requires a change of escalators. The upper mezzanine contains ticket vending machines and passenger information, and is decorated with ceramic tiles and fixtures with green and yellow accents. The colors of the walls drew criticism from fans of the Huskies football team because they were similar to the neon yellow that was later adopted by the Oregon Ducks, a rival football team. The entrance is contained in a two-story glass building, the upper level of which leads to a bridge over Montlake Boulevard; the bridge is also connected via a ramp and stairway to street level adjacent to the station. The surface plaza around the station includes bicycle racks under the bridge's ramp, as well as pay parking in nearby lots owned by the university. The station's elevators lead directly from the platform to the surface entrance and pedestrian overpass levels. The station has 234 bicycle rack spaces and a bicycle locker with capacity for 60 bicycles.

The non-public areas of the station include a track crossover, maintenance spaces, and a smoke ventilation system assisted by two surface vents to the north and south of the complex. University of Washington station was designed by LMN Architects, a Seattle-based firm that also worked on thirteen other light rail stations on the future East Link and Lynnwood Link projects. LMN received several design awards for their work on the station, including an American Institute of Architects 2021 Architecture Award, an American Institute of Architects Honor Award for Interior Architecture in 2018, an International Architecture Award from the Chicago Athenaeum, an Award of Merit from the Seattle chapter of the American Institute of Architects, and an Honorable Mention in the Fast Co.Design Innovation By Design Awards.

=== Public art ===
One major component of the station's architecture is the chamber-like mezzanine, which contains the station's sole piece of public art, Subterraneum by Leo Saul Berk, funded by Sound Transit's system-wide public art program. Subterraneum consists of 6,000 backlit LED panels lining the walls of the chamber. Berk took inspiration from the geological maps for the project and symbols representing the strata of layers near the station, while adding some original creations. The installation was praised for its scale and evocative staging by Gary Faigin of The Seattle Times, and dubbed an "underground planetarium" by the Huffington Post.

Until 2024, the station was represented on maps and signage by a pictogram of a graduation cap with the University of Washington logo. The pictogram series, part of the public art program, was retired in 2024 and replaced by station numbers. During construction of the station from 2010 to 2014, a temporary piece of art known as the "Great Wall of Us" was installed on the fence surrounding the work site. The 1,100-foot-long (340 m) wall featured 800 photographs of 1,500 people taken at university events and at Tukwila International Boulevard station, interspersed with viewing windows into the work site and explanatory text.

== Services ==
The station is served by the 1 Line and 2 Line, both part of the Link light rail system. University of Washington is situated between U District and Capitol Hill stations; it is the seventh southbound station from Lynnwood City Center, the northern terminus of both lines. Link light rail trains serve University of Washington station 20 hours a day on weekdays and Saturdays, from 5:00 a.m. to 12:00 a.m.; and 18 hours on Sundays, from 6:00 a.m. to 12:00 a.m. During regular weekday service, trains on each line operate roughly every eight minutes during rush hour, ten minutes during midday operation, and twelve to fifteen minutes in the early morning and at night. On weekends, trains on each line arrive at University of Washington station every ten minutes during midday hours and every twelve to fifteen minutes during mornings and evenings. The two lines combine for frequencies of four minutes during rush hour and five minutes during midday and weekend service. The station is approximately 7 minutes from Westlake station in Downtown Seattle, 32 minutes from Bellevue Downtown station, and 45 minutes from SeaTac/Airport station. In 2025, an average of 5,827 passengers boarded Link trains at University of Washington station on weekdays.

University of Washington station is also a major bus hub, with seven bus stops around the Montlake Triangle and nearby streets served by routes that primarily travel from Northeast Seattle and the Eastside. King County Metro operates ten routes from the station that connect to the University District, Ballard, Lake City, Downtown Seattle, Bellevue, Kirkland, and Shoreline. A Sound Transit Express route travels from the station to Redmond. Until 2021, six Community Transit commuter routes connected the station to areas in Snohomish County. The bus–rail transfer at University of Washington station has been criticized for its long walking distance, particularly for stops on the west side of Montlake Boulevard.
