= Mike Ross (artist) =

American sculptor

Mike Ross is an American sculptor known for large scale public art projects.

== Works ==
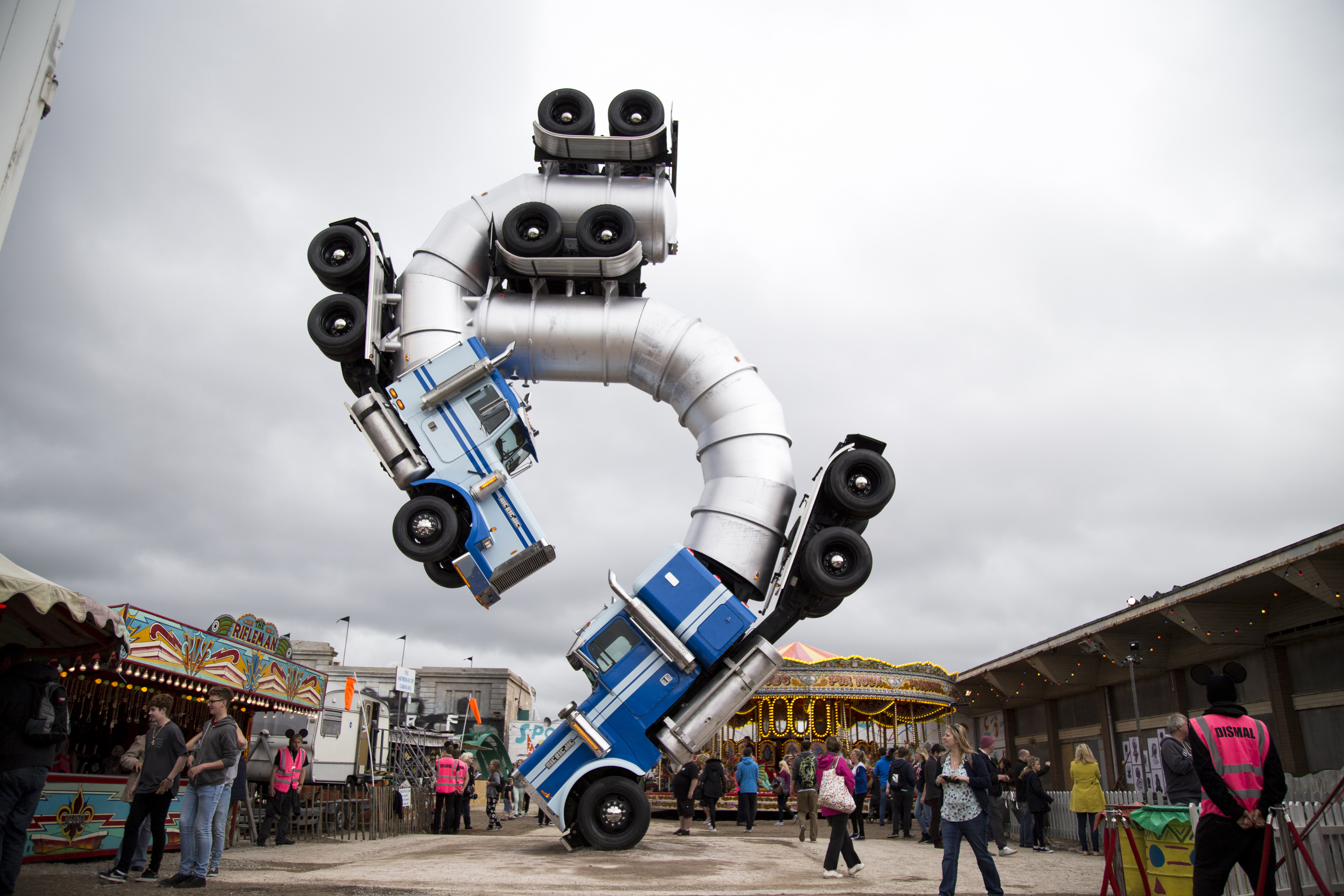
Big Rig Jig at Dismaland in 2015

Ross' best known work, Big Rig Jig, consisted of two modified tanker trucks attached to each other vertically in an S shape, with a truss installed in the tanks that allowed people to climb inside. The piece was built at American Steel, an art fabrication shop in Oakland, California. It was commissioned by the Black Rock City, LLC for Burning Man in 2007, and was considered one of the highlights of the event. It toured to the Coachella Music Festival in 2008, and featured at Dismaland in 2015. Ross described the work as a commentary on America's unsustainable oil economy.

In 2008 Ross was hired by Sound Transit, Seattle, Washington's light rail agency, to design a sculpture for the Capitol Hill station of its University Link project. Ross' design, titled Jet Kiss, featuring two fighter jets sliced and rearranged to appear as if they are kissing, created some controversy among members of the local community who objected to its use of military aircraft.

In 2006 Ross and Nicole Whelan created Colorfield, an interactive outdoor installation for Sculpture Key West.

== Life and education ==
Ross is a graduate of Stanford University.
