= Capitol Hill station =

Light rail station in Seattle, Washington

49 Capitol Hill
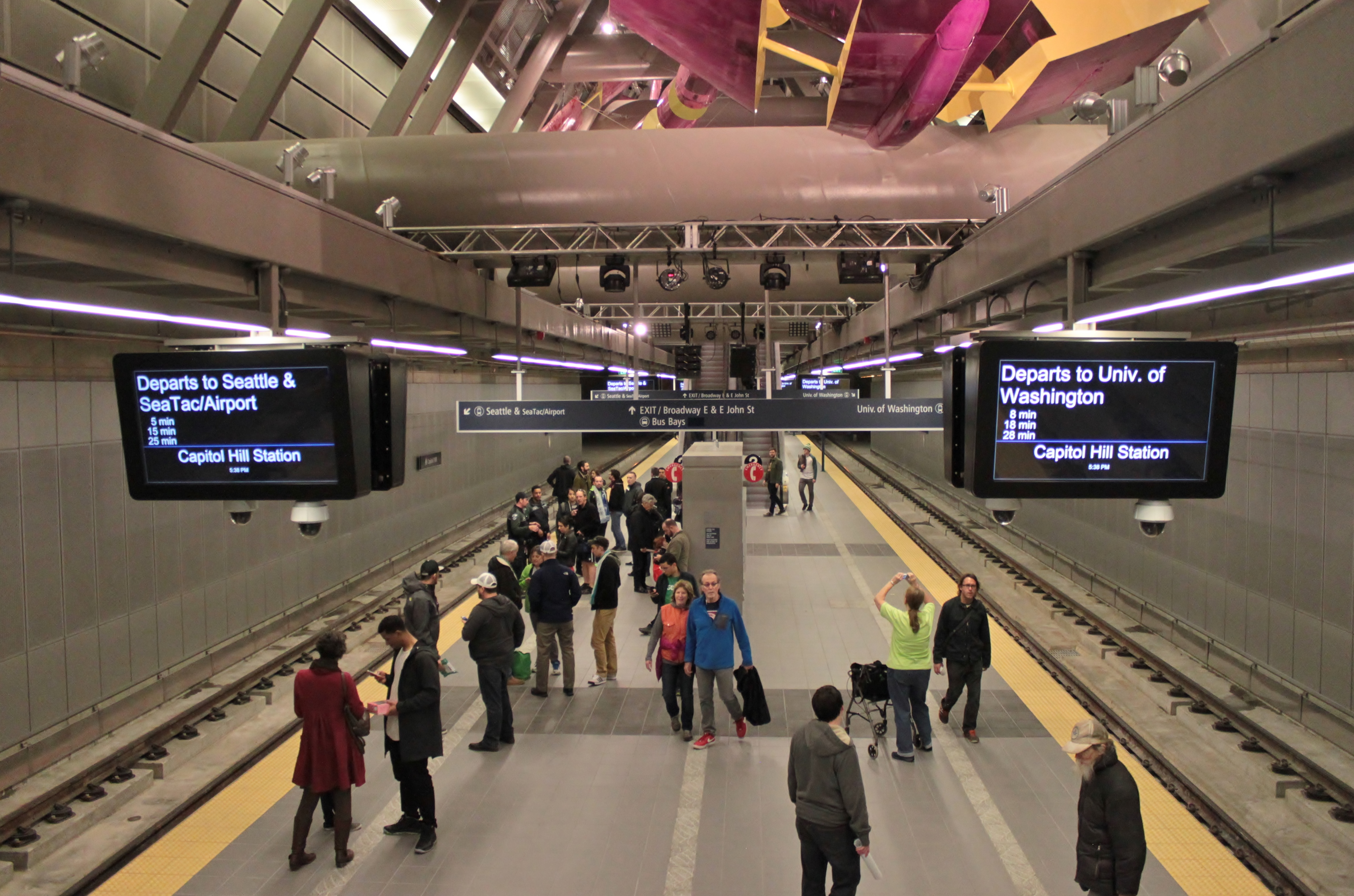
- Capitol Hill station's platform level

General information
- Location: 140 Broadway East; Seattle, Washington; United States
- Coordinates: 47°37′07″N 122°19′13″W
- System: Link light rail
- Owner: Sound Transit
- Platforms: 1 island platform
- Tracks: 2
- Connections: First Hill Streetcar; King County Metro

Construction
- Structure type: Underground
- Depth: 65 feet (20 m)
- Cycle facilities: Racks
- Accessible: Yes

History
- Opened: March 19, 2016

Passengers
- 9,715 daily weekday boardings (2025); 3,444,995 total boardings (2025)

Services
Preceding station	Sound Transit	Following station
Link
University of Washington toward Lynnwood City Center	1 Line	Westlake toward Federal Way Downtown
University of Washington toward Lynnwood City Center	2 Line	Westlake toward Downtown Redmond
Preceding station	Seattle Streetcar	Following station
Broadway & Pike-Pine toward Occidental Mall	First Hill Streetcar transfer at Broadway & Denny	Terminus
Location

Capitol Hill station is a light rail station in the Capitol Hill neighborhood of Seattle, Washington, United States. It is served by the 1 Line and 2 Line of Sound Transit's Link light rail system. The station is located near the intersection of Broadway and East John Street and situated between the Westlake and University of Washington stations. Capitol Hill station consists of an island platform approximately 65 feet (20 m) under street level, connected to three surface entrances via two mezzanines. It contains pieces of public art, including Mike Ross's sculpture Jet Kiss and two murals by cartoonist Ellen Forney.

Capitol Hill had been proposed as the site of a subway stop in unimplemented plans from 1911 and 1968, but voter approval did not come until 1996. It was built as part of the University Link Extension, which began construction in 2009 and opened on March 19, 2016. Construction of the station required the demolition of two city blocks along Broadway, which was redeveloped into a transit-oriented, mixed-use complex that opened in 2021. Light rail trains serve the station twenty hours a day on most days; the headway between trains is six minutes during peak periods, with less frequent service at other times. The station is also served by the First Hill Streetcar and several King County Metro bus routes at nearby stops.

== Location ==
Capitol Hill station is located on Broadway between East Denny Way and East John Street, in the Broadway District of Capitol Hill, northeast of Downtown Seattle. The station is immediately west of Cal Anderson Park and north of the Seattle Central College campus. The Seattle University campus, Pike–Pine nightlife corridor, and Volunteer Park are also within a short distance of the station.

The area surrounding the station is primarily zoned for multi-family dwellings and has 15,098 total housing units with 20,890 residents within a half-mile (0.8 km) radius; these units are primarily renter-occupied and roughly 17 percent of units are affordable to lower-income households, with some subsidized housing nearby. There is also a major commercial strip on Broadway supporting ground-level retail stores and other uses; the area is also home to 15,171 jobs. The western slope of Capitol Hill has the highest population density of any area in Washington state, with 55,000 people per square mile (21,000 per km^{2}).

== History ==
=== Background and planning ===
The Broadway business district on Capitol Hill was developed between 1900 and 1930 along new city streetcar lines connecting Downtown Seattle to the University District. Urban planner Virgil Bogue's rejected 1911 comprehensive plan for Seattle envisioned a citywide subway system, including an underground loop on Capitol Hill and Broadway that would connect with an east–west line on Pike Street. The Forward Thrust Committee's planned regional rapid transit system, rejected by voters in 1968 and 1970, included a station at the intersection of Broadway, Union Street, and Madison Street, as well as additional stations in eastern Capitol Hill.

In the 1990s, a regional transit authority (later Sound Transit) was formed to study a modern light rail system for the Seattle metropolitan area. For the segment between Downtown Seattle and the University District, a surface-running line through Eastlake and a tunnel under Capitol Hill were considered. The tunnel option was chosen for a ballot measure that took place in March 1995. Voters rejected the $6.7 billion proposal, including a 69-mile (111 km) light rail system connecting Seattle to Bellevue, Washington, Lynnwood, and Tacoma. It was replaced by a smaller plan. In November 1996, voters approved a condensed $3.9 billion regional transit plan that included a tunneled light rail station under Capitol Hill.

Sound Transit revisited the routing issue during community meetings in 1997 and 1998, proposing an alternate route through Eastlake, South Lake Union, and the Seattle Center if engineering of the Capitol Hill tunnel would jeopardize the project's budget. The project's draft environmental impact statement, released in December 1998, determined that the Capitol Hill tunnel would be feasible and recommended its inclusion in the plan. Sound Transit proposed that Capitol Hill's cut and cover station be located under Broadway south of East John Street, with several entrances to serve nearby Seattle Central Community College and the Broadway business district. From the station, trains would continue south to a station in First Hill before entering the Downtown Seattle Transit Tunnel, and north under Portage Bay to the western University District. Seattle representatives proposed an additional Capitol Hill station, near Broadway and East Roy Street, but it was left out of the preferred alternative due to cost concerns. In November 1999, Sound Transit finalized its preferred alternative, adding a crossover north of Capitol Hill station near East Thomas Street.

Sound Transit suspended planning for the Portage Bay tunnel in 2000 after it received construction bids that were $171 million higher than expected and found, through soil testing, that a deeper tunnel would be required. The project's total cost rose to $1 billion over budget, and the schedule was delayed by three years because of unrealistic time and cost estimates made during earlier planning stages. Capitol Hill businesses, while initially supportive of the light rail station's placement, later pulled their support of the cut and cover option because of the extended construction timeline. Sound Transit, faced with budget issues and further schedule delays, deferred construction of the segment between Downtown Seattle and the University District in 2001 while re-evaluating alignment options.

In 2004, Sound Transit selected a new tunnel route that crossed the Lake Washington Ship Canal at the Montlake Cut, to the east of the Portage Bay area. The revised tunnel would have stations at First Hill, on Capitol Hill at Nagle Place between East John and East Howell streets, at Husky Stadium, and a University District station at Brooklyn Avenue and NE 45th Street. The First Hill station was removed from plans in 2005 because of concerns over construction risks. The University District station was re-organized as part of the Northgate extension, leaving the Husky Stadium station as the tunnel's interim terminus. The $1.9 billion project, named "University Link", was approved for construction in April 2006 and earned federal approval later that year.

=== Construction and opening ===
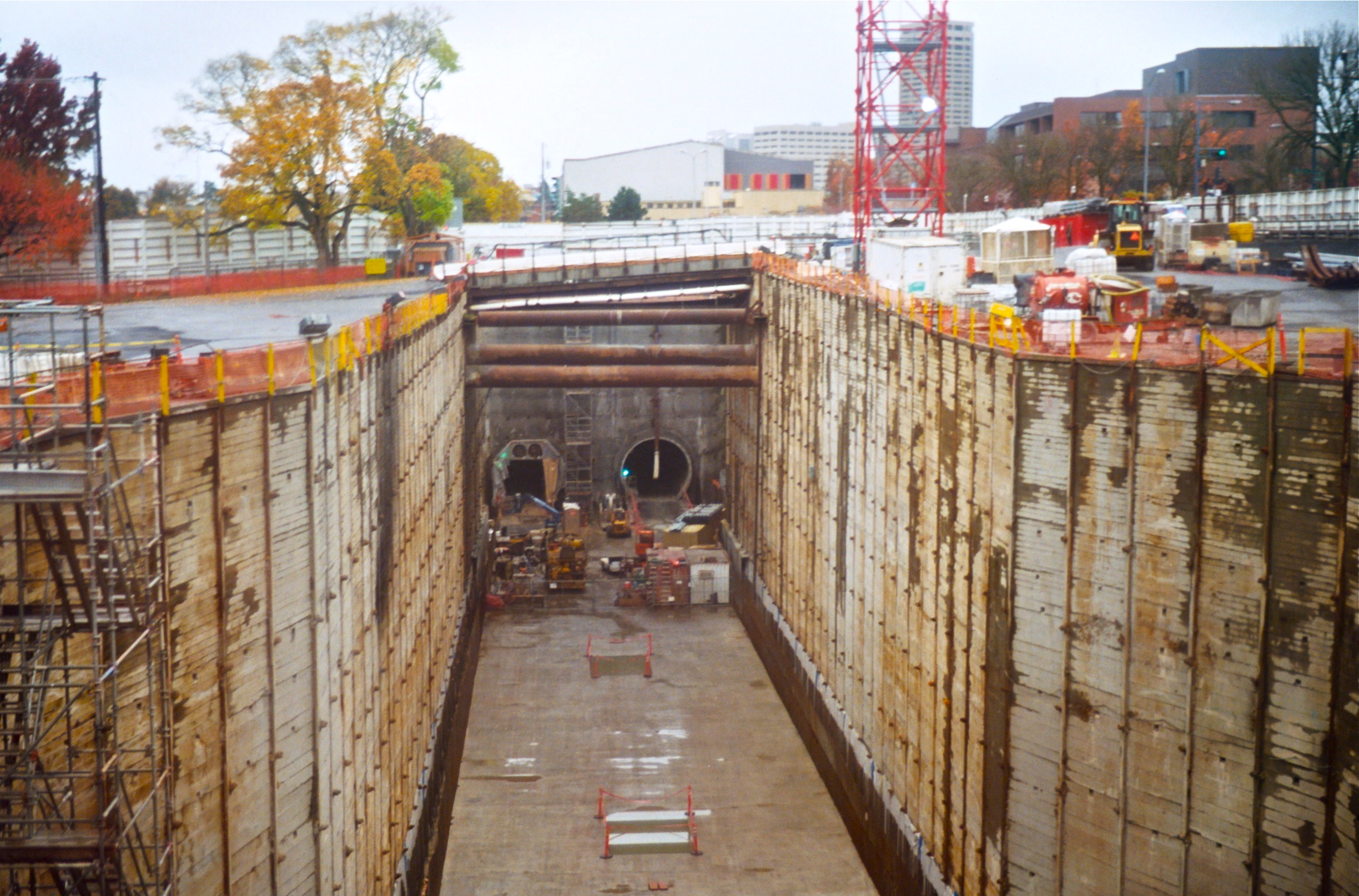
The excavated station box and poured concrete floor, seen in late 2012

The Capitol Hill station's design was finalized in 2007 and 2008, during a series of public hearings and meetings with the city's design commission. Businesses and residents at the station site were moved after Sound Transit acquired properties in 2008. The vacant buildings were filled temporarily with pieces of art coordinated by Sound Transit. Salvaging and recycling of materials in the vacant buildings began in late 2008, including a community event to remove small plants for re-planting by neighborhood residents; approximately 90 percent of material was recycled, and proceeds from the sale of scrap metal were used to provide hot meals for the homeless. Demolition of buildings on the station site began in March 2009, shortly before the formal groundbreaking for the University Link project, and was completed by August. Among the 20 demolished buildings were a three-story apartment building, a used book store, the Espresso Vivace coffee shop, a nail salon, and a copy shop. Many of the displaced and nearby businesses moved to the northern end of the Broadway district during construction, relying on mitigation funds from Sound Transit and the neighborhood's chamber of commerce.

Preparation work for station construction began in January 2010, with the closure of East Denny Way and the installation of a construction wall around the site. The 24-foot-high (7.3 m) wall was painted red and adorned with public artwork by local street artists over the course of the five-year construction period. Excavation of the station box began in July, and reached the future platform level in December. In June 2011, the first of three tunnel boring machines, named "Brenda", was launched from Capitol Hill toward Westlake station in Downtown Seattle. A separate pair of machines, "Balto" and "Togo", were launched from University of Washington station at the same time and arrived at Capitol Hill station in March and April 2012. Brenda completed the twin tunnels to downtown in May 2012.

In October 2012, Turner Construction was awarded the $105 million construction contract to build and finish Capitol Hill station's interior and entrances. Turner began interior construction in March 2013, using a steel PERI truss and movable concrete form system to pour concrete for station elements. Construction on the west entrance and its cut and cover tunnel under Broadway required the street to be closed and rearranged several times beginning in November 2013. By the summer of 2015, work on Capitol Hill station was declared 90 percent complete, and the construction wall was gradually removed.

Capitol Hill station, along with University of Washington station, opened to the public six months early on March 19, 2016, during a community celebration that drew 67,000 people. As part of the inauguration of the new tunnel, local dignitaries rode a train from University of Washington station to Capitol Hill. There Mayor Ed Murray and First Man Michael Shiosaki pulled a ceremonial cord to open the station. The celebration included festivities at street level, including an open-air market, live music, an expo pavilion, and a food truck stand on East Denny Way. Over a thousand pieces of the former construction wall, known as the "Red Wall", were cut by Seattle Central College students and offered to light rail riders who visited local businesses.

The 2 Line entered simulated service on February 14, 2026, with passengers able to board trains from Lynnwood to International District/Chinatown station.

== Station layout ==
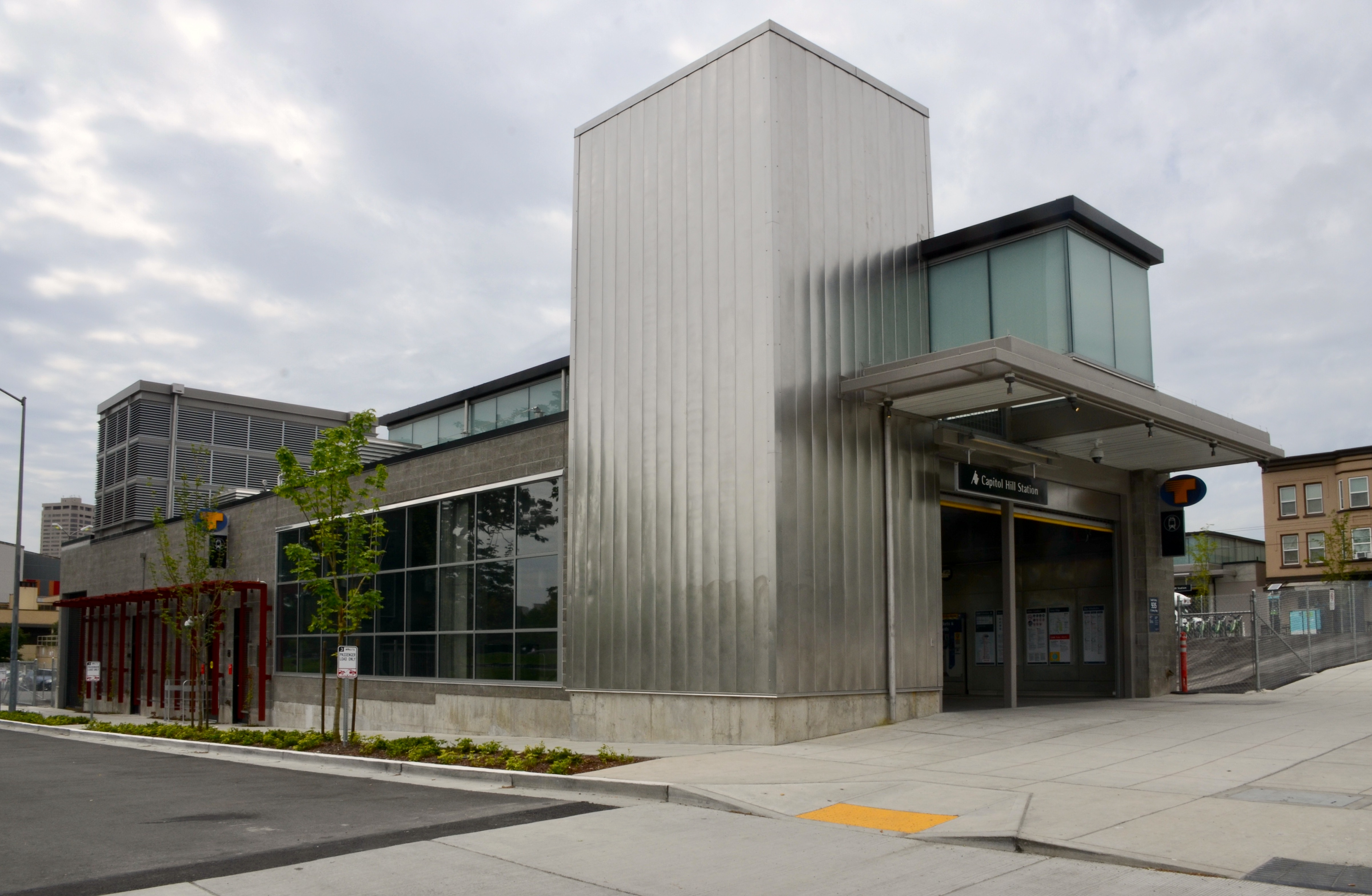
The station's southern entrance, on E. Barbara Bailey Way just east of Broadway

Capitol Hill station consists of a single island platform located 65 feet (20 m) below street level, in the vicinity of Broadway and East John Street in Seattle. Two sets of escalators and elevators lead upward from the platform to two mezzanines at the north and south ends of the station, connecting to three surface entrances. The north entrance is located at the southeast corner of Broadway and East John Street; the south entrance is on Barbara Bailey Way (formerly East Denny Way) between Broadway and Nagle Place and has a direct elevator to the platform. The west entrance is located on the west side of Broadway to the south of East Denny Way, connected by a 163-foot-long (50 m) tunnel under the street.

The station's underground structure is 540 feet (160 m) long, 80 feet (24 m) wide, and 75 feet (23 m) deep. Capitol Hill station houses most of the University Link tunnel's support systems, including power, communications, and ventilation. The platform level forms a tall vault through the use of horizontal steel trusses that span 45 feet (14 m) across the station box. The entrances incorporate large ventilation shafts and clerestory windows to allow natural light into the ticketing hall. Hewitt Architects designed Capitol Hill station to be utilitarian while maintaining the neighborhood's vibrancy. It features finishes of exposed concrete, as well as ceramic tiles and terra cotta trellises. The general cleanliness of the station has been criticized due to the presence of litter and discarded items near the escalators. A population of pigeons have left droppings around Capitol Hill station's entrances; Sound Transit installed bird control spikes to move them away from pathways and began trapping pigeons for off-site release in 2023.

=== Art ===
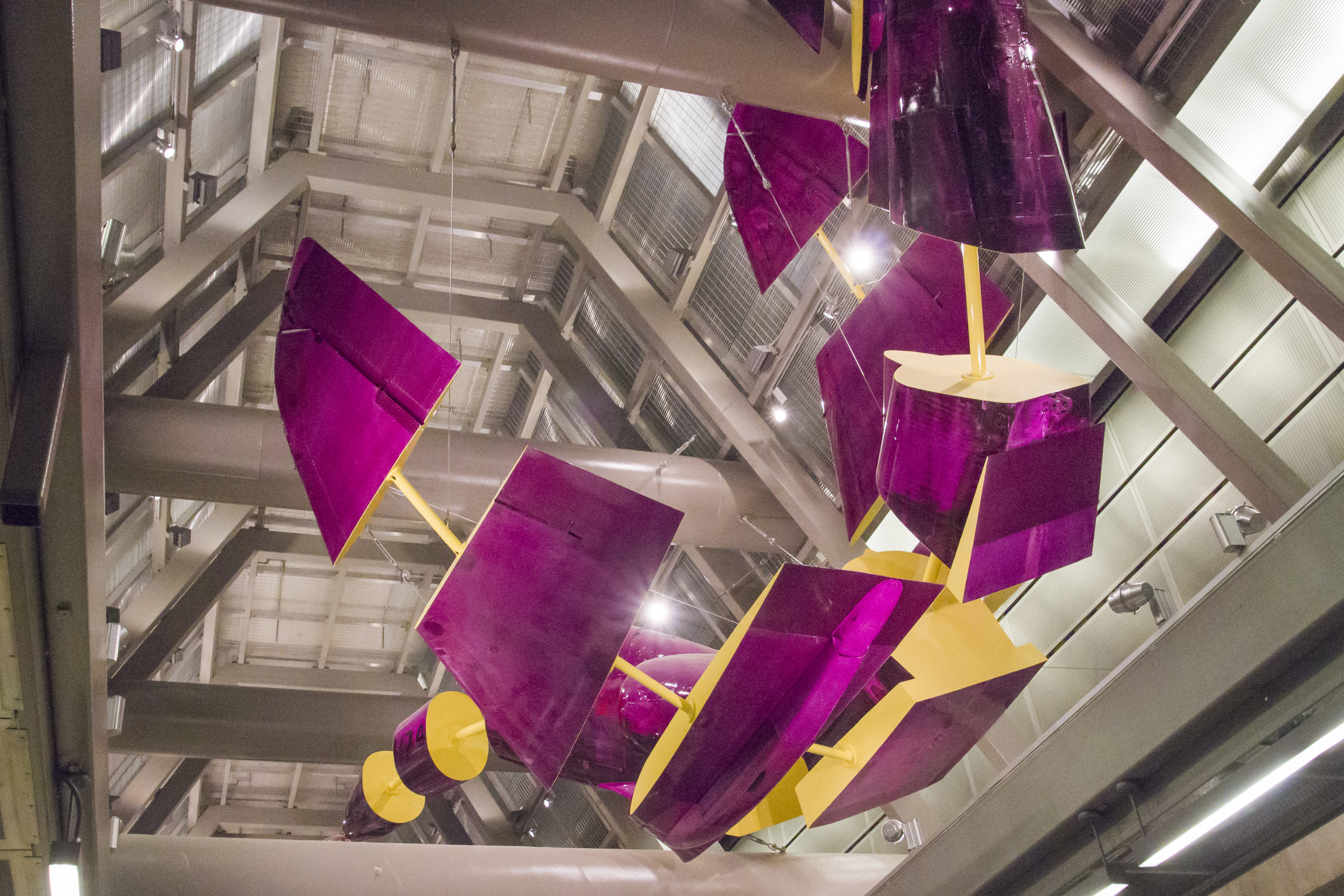
One of the component fighter planes of Jet Kiss, which hangs above the station's platform

Capitol Hill station houses three pieces of public art as part of Sound Transit's system-wide art program. Mike Ross's Jet Kiss consists of a pair of disassembled, pink and yellow fighter jets that hang suspended above the platform. The piece, which initially met with public backlash over its use of war planes, references both the city's aviation industry and the city bird, the blue heron. Capitol Hill cartoonist Ellen Forney has two murals in the station's north and west entrances, Crossed Pinkies and Walking Fingers, which portray simple, large hands outlined against a bright red background. The murals, which consist of porcelain enamel on steel panels, are meant to evoke a sense of "coming together [whilst] pulling apart", with both playfully leading passengers from street level into the station. Forney designed Crossed Pinkies to echo Ross's Jet Kiss, sharing the "coming together" theme. The station also had a pictogram that identified it on maps and signage, featuring the rainbow flag to honor the neighborhood's gay and lesbian community. The pictogram was retired in 2024 and replaced by station numbers.

Between 2010 and 2015, the station's construction site was home to several temporary art installations curated by Sound Transit's art program. In 2009, the empty lot left after site demolition was host to Dan Corson's Oscillating Field, an interactive light artwork that used fluorescent light rods to display sine waves at night. The noise and dust wall, painted red and known as the "Red Wall", was transformed into an outdoor art gallery curated by Sound Transit artist D.K. Pan with the theme "The City: Love, Loss, and the Moveable Future". The Red Wall's art included painted murals, three-dimensional pieces, and the use of videos screened on the wall. The Red Wall hosted a spraypainted mural by a former graffiti artist, a bottle cap collage, and hand-painted animated stills from the Seattle Experimental Animation Team. The artwork was removed in early 2015, ahead of the wall's demolition, and returned to the artists for re-use.

In October 2024, the Sound Transit art program began a pilot program to display rotating original works by local graffiti writers on two panels at the station entrances. The program is intended to deter illegal graffiti that had previously been added at the station.

== Transit-oriented development ==
The staging areas used during the construction of Capitol Hill station were reused for a large transit-oriented development managed by Sound Transit and the City of Seattle. The development, spread across four seven-story buildings on 2 acres (0.81 ha) between Broadway and 10th Avenue East, includes 428 apartments (of which 42 percent are designated as affordable housing), retail space, a community center, plaza, bike facilities, and a permanent venue for the local farmers' market. Sound Transit signed a 99-year, $19 million lease with Portland developer Gerding Edlen in 2016 to build and manage the property. The project began construction in July 2018 and was completed in early 2021. The Broadway Farmers Market opened at the plaza in April 2021, moving from a sidewalk adjacent to Seattle Central College. An additional surplus property, next to the west entrance, has been offered by Seattle Central College for possible redevelopment.

Other nearby lots have been redeveloped as a result of the light rail station opening on Capitol Hill. The Broadway Post Office, located adjacent to the south and west entrances, was demolished in 2016 for the construction of a 44-unit apartment building. An adjacent corner property, already home to a 14-unit apartment building, is planned to be replaced by a 50-unit building. The Bonney-Watson funeral home, located immediately south of the station, was sold for redevelopment in 2017.

== Services ==
The station is served by the 1 Line and 2 Line, both part of the Link light rail system. Capitol Hill is situated between University of Washington and Westlake stations; it is the eighth southbound station from Lynnwood City Center, the northern terminus of both lines. Link light rail trains serve Capitol Hill station 20 hours a day on weekdays and Saturdays, from 5:00 a.m. to 12:00 a.m.; and 18 hours on Sundays, from 6:00 a.m. to 12:00 a.m. During regular weekday service, trains on each line operate roughly every eight minutes during rush hour, ten minutes during midday operation, and twelve to fifteen minutes in the early morning and at night. On weekends, trains on each line arrive at Capitol Hill station every ten minutes during midday hours and every twelve to fifteen minutes during mornings and evenings. The two lines combine for frequencies of four minutes during rush hour and five minutes during midday and weekend service. The station is approximately 29 minutes from Lynnwood City Center station, 30 minutes from Bellevue Downtown station, and 41 minutes from SeaTac/Airport station. In 2025, an average of 9,715 passengers boarded Link trains at Capitol Hill station on weekdays.

Capitol Hill station is also served by bus and streetcar stops located near its three entrances. The First Hill Streetcar line terminates at Broadway and Denny Way, adjacent to the west entrance, and connects the neighborhood to First Hill, Little Saigon, Chinatown-International District, and Pioneer Square. King County Metro operates several bus routes that converge at Broadway and East John Street and connect to other areas of Seattle. These routes include service west towards Downtown Seattle and South Lake Union; east towards the Central District and Madison Park; south towards First Hill, Beacon Hill, the Rainier Valley, and West Seattle; and north towards the University District. On weekends during the spring, summer, and early autumn, a Trailhead Direct shuttle connects Capitol Hill station to North Bend and Mount Si, a popular hiking area.
