= Jet Kiss =

Public art in Seattle, Washington, U.S.

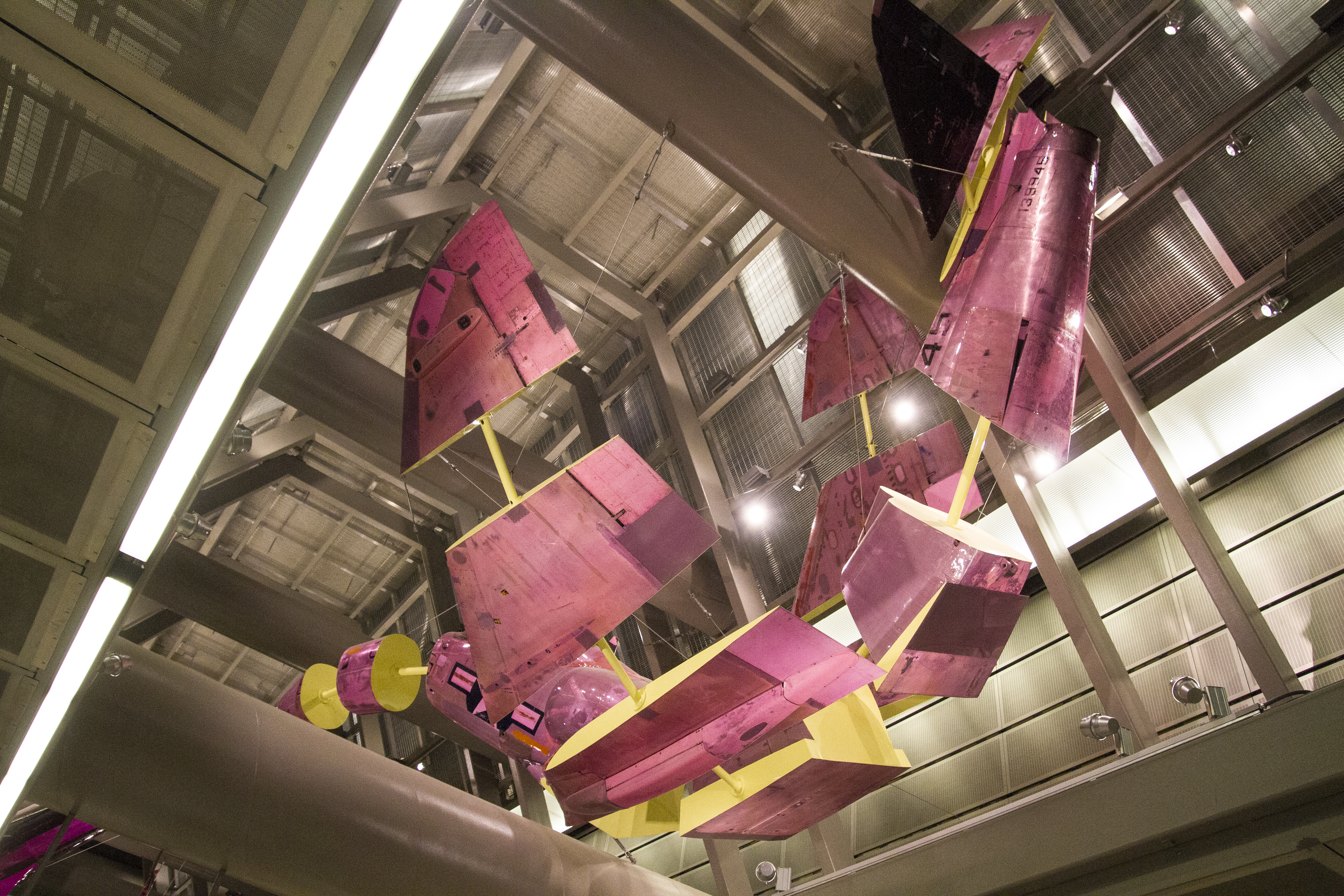
- The sculpture in May 2015
- Artist: Mike Ross
- Year: 2015
- Type: Sculpture
- Medium: Steel; aluminum; paint
- Subject: Douglas A-4 Skyhawks
- Dimensions: 90 feet (27 m) long
- Location: Seattle, Washington
- 47°37′9.12″N 122°19′12.72″W
- Owner: Sound Transit
- Website: mikerossart.net/jetkiss

Jet Kiss is a 2015 sculpture by American artist Mike Ross, installed at the Capitol Hill light rail station in Seattle, Washington. The 90-foot-long (27 m) sculpture consists of two decommissioned A-4 Skyhawk fighter jets that were sliced and arranged nose-to-nose; the piece is suspended above the station's platform level.

Jet Kiss was commissioned by Sound Transit as part of their public art program in 2008, during planning and final design of the station. The initial concept was met with a mixed reception from the public over its use of warplanes, resulting in design modifications. It was installed in early 2015, and the station was opened to the public on March 19, 2016.

== Description ==
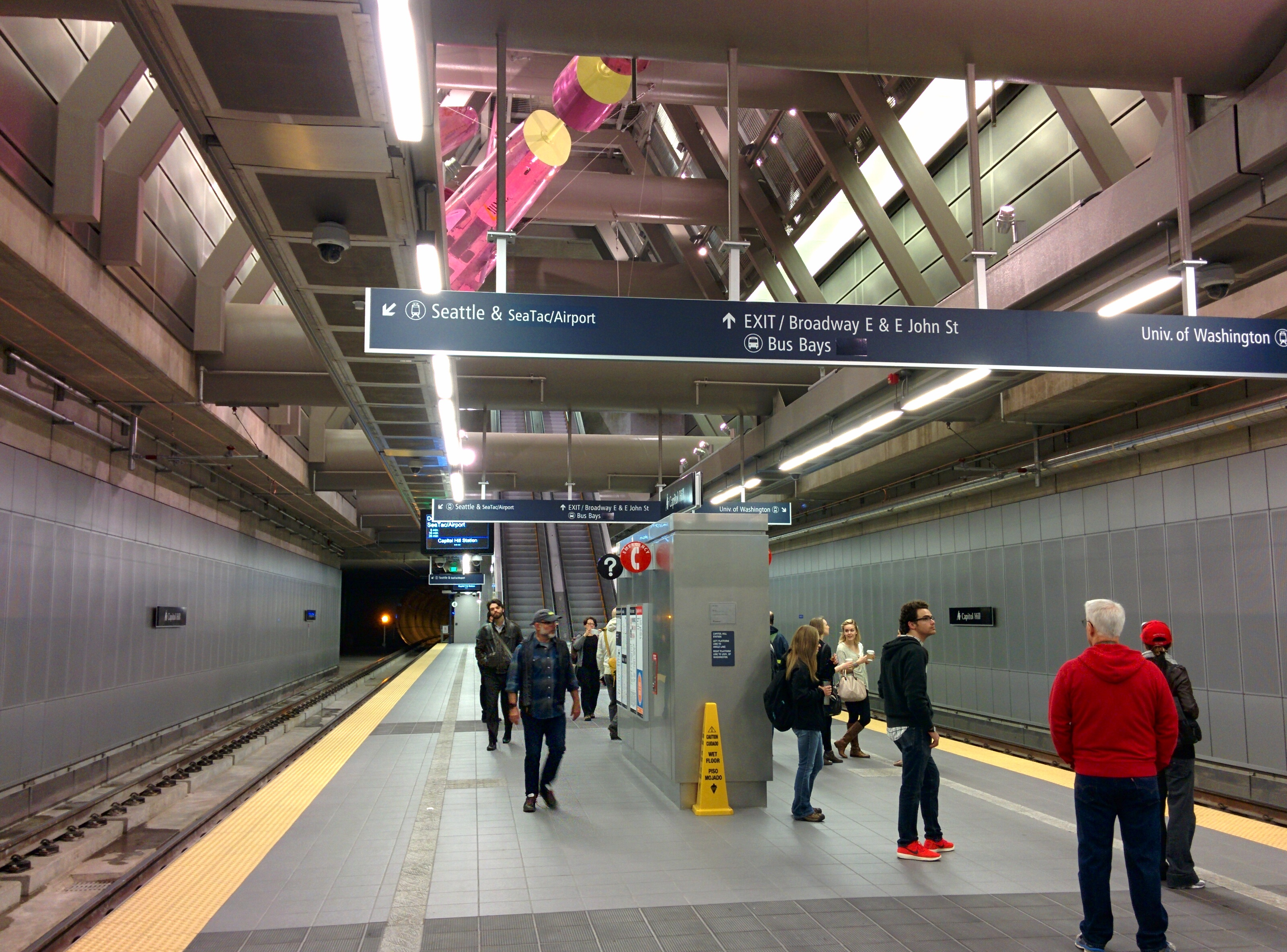
The sculpture is suspended above the Capitol Hill station platform.

Mike Ross's Jet Kiss is suspended approximately 50 feet (15 m) above the platform of Capitol Hill station, a light rail station in Seattle's Capitol Hill neighborhood. The piece consists of two decommissioned United States Navy A-4 Skyhawk fighter jets, which were disassembled and painted magenta and yellow. The military markings are preserved with a layer of translucent paint. Both jets are arranged nose-to-nose and span 90 feet (27 m) along the platform, fitting between struts that form the station's walls.

Ross said he wanted the piece to exude organic forms, drawn from the city and its surroundings. The choice of magenta and yellow paint for the jets was a move to offset the city's stereotypical overcast skies. The choice of jets was a reference to the city's aviation history; its use of a non-aggressive and bird-like arrangement (itself a reference to the city bird, the Blue heron) was a counter to the inherent aggressiveness of jets as a symbol.

The piece was given a budget of $440,000 by Sound Transit's public art program. Jet Kiss is joined by two murals from local cartoonist Ellen Forney at two of the three entrances to the station; Forney stated that she designed one of her pieces, "Crossed Pinkies", as a response to Jet Kiss.

As part of regular maintenance, Jet Kiss is cleaned of dust during overnight shifts by transit workers.

== History and public reaction ==
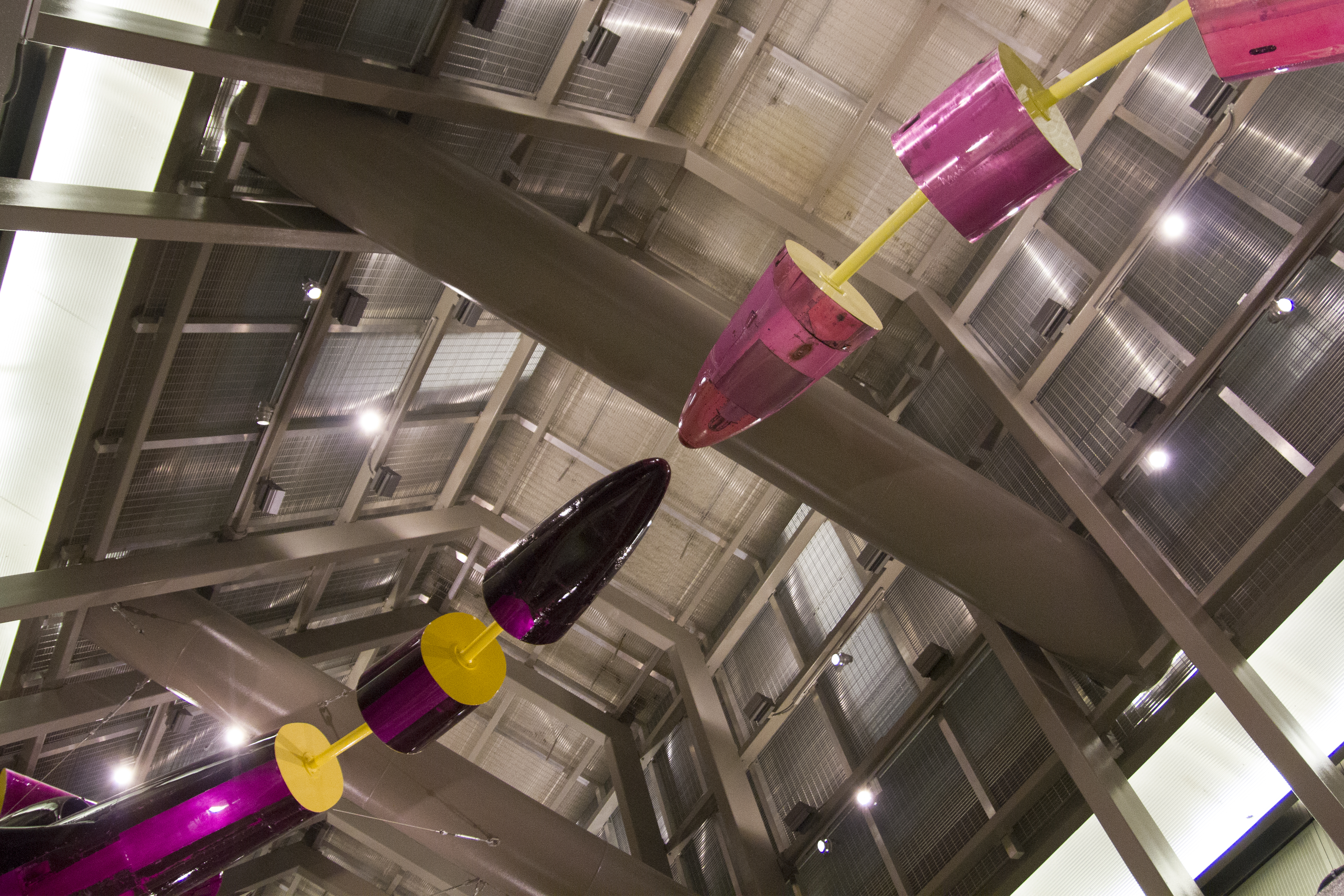
Detail of the sculpture in 2015

Sound Transit, Seattle's regional transit operator, adopted a public art funding program in 1998. The program, known as "STart", allocates one percent of construction costs to art for all Sound Transit projects, including light rail. Construction of the $1.9 billion University Link Extension included $1.25 million for public art through the STart program; $550,000 was specifically allocated for Capitol Hill station, located in one of the city's arts-heavy neighborhoods.

A national call for artists was conducted in 2007, with 120 entrants submitting proposals to Sound Transit. Out of them, Brooklyn-based Mike Ross was selected unanimously by the station art panel in February 2008; Ross was sought out by Sound Transit art director Barbara Luecke after seeing his sculpture "Big Rig Jig" at Burning Man.

Ross presented his initial concept of deconstructed fighter jets at an open house in April, and was met with negative reactions from members of the public. The piece was criticized for its use of "instruments of war", and Ross himself criticized for being a non-resident. The 43rd District Democrats passed a unanimous resolution calling for "more culturally sensitive themes for public art [...] instead of warplanes" and the hiring of local talent. Ross was taken aback by the criticism, telling New York's Village Voice that he "definitely didn't expect to get resistance from left-wing political activists". Cartoonist Ellen Forney, whose work would also be used at the station, defended Ross's work and called his proposal "thought-provoking" and "something that's not 'safe' and totally public art-y".

A second public open house was held in June, to more favorable reactions. A revised design was presented in October, re-arranging the jets into more abstract shapes and arranging them to "kiss" rather than "dogfight". The piece, called "Together", was approved by Sound Transit and granted a budget of $484,000 in August 2009.

The two fighter jets were acquired from a scrapyard in Arizona, and were sent to Ross's studio in Oakland, California for disassembly and reconfiguration. Jet Kiss, as it was later renamed, was installed at Capitol Hill station in February 2015. The station opened to the public on March 19, 2016.

== Critical response ==
In a 2016 review, Gary Faigin, director of the Gage Academy of Art and art critic for The Seattle Times, called the piece "ambitious" but lacking in execution, with obstructed views from the station's architecture at track level hindering its completeness. Faigin, however, complimented that it comes together from views at the mezzanine and escalators.

== See also ==
- 2015 in art
