= Northgate Link tunnel =

Light rail extension and tunnel in Seattle, Washington, U.S.

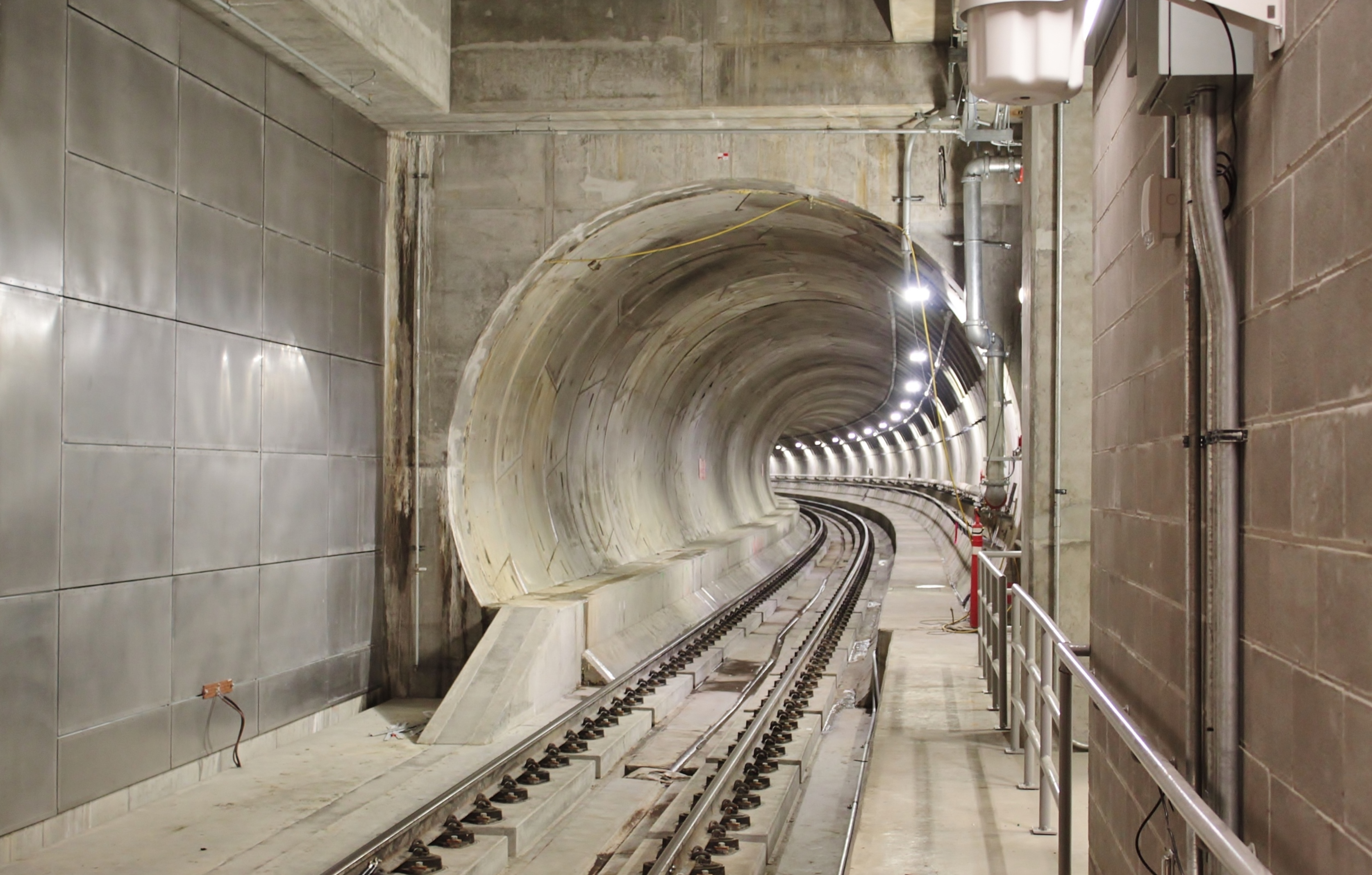
- Viewed from Roosevelt station in 2019

Overview
- Line: 1 Line; 2 Line
- Location: Seattle, Washington, U.S.
- Status: Active
- Start: Maple Leaf Portal (near Northgate station)
- End: University of Washington station

Operation
- Constructed: 2012–2021
- Opened: October 2, 2021
- Owner: Sound Transit
- Traffic: Link light rail

Technical
- Length: 3.4 mi (5.5 km)
- No. of tracks: Double
- Track gauge: 4 ft 8 1/2 in (1,435 mm)
- Tunnel clearance: 21 ft (6.4 m)
- Width: 21 ft (6.4 m)

The Northgate Link tunnel is a light rail tunnel in Seattle, Washington, United States. The twin-bore Link light rail tunnel, built as part of the Northgate Link extension (formerly known as "North Link"), carries a section of the 1 Line and 2 Line. It is 3.4 miles (5.5 km) long and connects the University District to Northgate.

The tunnel begins at University of Washington station (the north end of the University Link tunnel) and travels northwest across the University of Washington campus. It serves intermediate stations at U District and Roosevelt before emerging on the east side of Interstate 5 at a portal in Maple Leaf. Light rail trains then continue on an elevated guideway to Northgate station, where the extension ends. The extension was approved in 2008 by voters in the Sound Transit 2 (ST2) package, began construction in 2012, and entered service on October 2, 2021. The extension cost $1.9 billion to construct.

== Routing ==
For the 4.3-mile (6.9 km) Northgate Link extension project, the paired tunnels constructed for University Link continue north to the University District and the Roosevelt neighborhoods before emerging at the surface along I-5 near NE 94th Street to serve the elevated Northgate station. The tunneled portion is 3.5 miles (5.6 km) long, while the elevated section is 0.8 miles (1.3 km).

An extension north to Lynnwood was approved as part of the Sound Transit 2 ballot measure in 2008, along with funding to continue planning future service to Everett. The Lynnwood Link extension was opened in August 2024 and was served by the 1 Line. Service on the 2 Line began in February 2026.

The section that passes approximately 140 feet (43 m) under the University of Washington campus has a capped speed of 35 miles per hour (56 km/h) to prevent interference with sensitive equipment used for university research. The tunnel also uses 7,500 feet (2,300 m) of rubber supports for "floating slabs" that cushion and absorb energy from the trains.

== Stations ==
Name	City/Neighborhood	Location
University Link Tunnel to Capitol Hill and Westlake
University of Washington	University District, Seattle	Montlake Blvd. NE and NE Pacific St.
North end of University Link
U District	University District, Seattle	NE 45th St. and Brooklyn Ave. NE
Roosevelt	Roosevelt, Seattle	NE 65th St. and 12th Ave. NE
North end of tunnel (Maple Leaf Portal); south end of elevated section
Northgate	Northgate, Seattle	1st Ave. NE and NE 103rd St.
Lynnwood Link extension to Pinehurst and Lynnwood City Center

== Construction ==
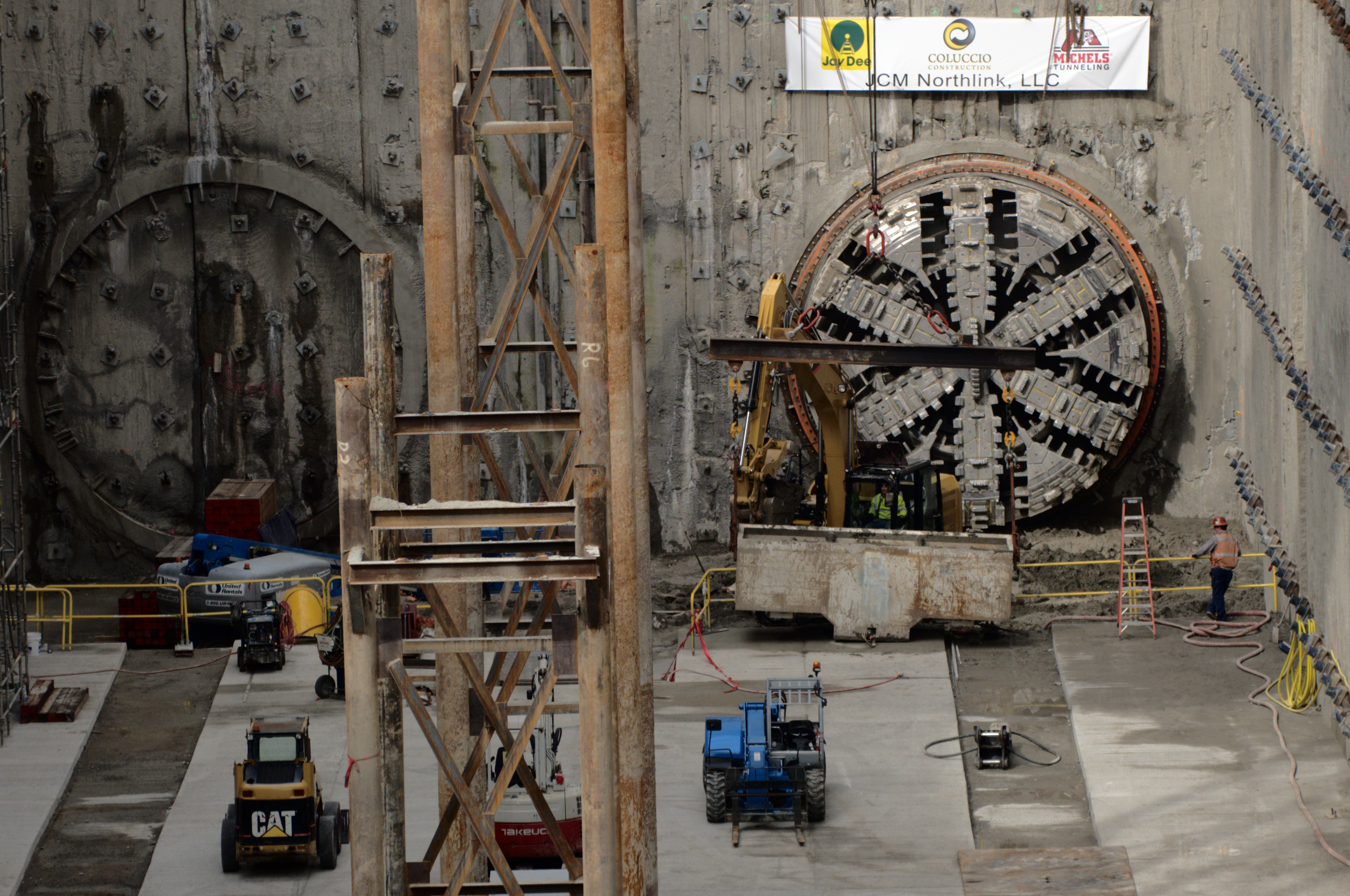
Cutting head of tunnel boring machine "Brenda" (right) at Roosevelt Station pit after completing tunnel from Northgate

Construction on the Northgate Link extension began in 2012 and opened for service on October 2, 2021. Train testing began in January 2021. The project had a $1.9 billion budget and ultimately cost $50 million less than budgeted. A direct loan of $615.3 million was authorized by the Federal Transit Administration in 2016 and is planned to be repaid by Sound Transit through 2056.

=== Tunnels ===
Each 3.4-mile (5.5 km) tunnel is dug southbound, starting from the Maple Leaf Portal, in three segments separated by stations, using a 21.5-foot (6.6 m) diameter tunnel boring machine. The machine digging the tunnel for northbound trains was named "Brenda" and the sister machine for the southbound trains was named "Pamela", but the names were dropped in March 2016 to reduce associations with the troubled "Bertha" machine used on the Alaskan Way Viaduct replacement tunnel project. Brenda was previously used on the University Link Tunnel from 2011 to 2012, digging both tunnels between Capitol Hill station and the Downtown Seattle Transit Tunnel.

TBM #1 (formerly Brenda) began excavation of the northbound tunnel on July 9, 2014, and reached Roosevelt station on March 17, 2015. It later reached the U District station on November 6, 2015, and completed the entire northbound tunnel to University of Washington station on March 30, 2016, less than two weeks after light rail service to that station from Downtown Seattle had begun. TBM #1 was disassembled and removed from the University of Washington station. Due to damage sustained by TBM #2, TBM #1 was refurbished and excavated the last (southbound) tunnel segment between June and September 2016.

TBM #2 (formerly Pamela) began excavation of the southbound tunnel on November 20, 2014, and reached Roosevelt station on July 13, 2015. For six weeks from late December 2015 to early February 2016, the machine was stopped at a point 650 feet (200 m) north of U District station after encountering hard soil that damaged five motors and the main gear of the machine. Repairs were made and the segment was completed on March 24, 2016. Additional repairs to TBM #2 needed to complete the final (southbound) tunnel segment would have potentially delayed the project's opening if the five months of float time were exceeded, leading JCM Northlink to finish the final segment with TBM #1.

The tunnel has 23 cross-passages between the bores that contain emergency exits, which were excavated using ground freezing.
