= O'Shea Building (Seattle) =

- Interactive map of the O'Shea Building area

General information
- Location: Seattle, Washington, U.S.
- Coordinates: 47.6116°N 122.3360°W

Design and construction
- Architect: Louis Leonard Mendel Sr.

The O'Shea Building is a historic building in Seattle, Washington, United States. The building was designed by Louis Leonard Mendel Sr. It was built in 1914 and has approximately 65,000 square feet (6,000 m^{2}). It houses Ben Bridge Jeweler's flagship store. In 2026, the building sold for approximately $17 million.
