= Ben Bridge Jeweler =

American jewelry retail chain

- Type: Subsidiary
- Industry: Retail
- Founded: 1912; 114 years ago, in Seattle, Washington
- Founder: Samuel Silverman; Ben Bridge
- Area served: United States
- Products: Jewelry
- Parent: Berkshire Hathaway
- Website: www.benbridge.com

Ben Bridge Jeweler is a high-end American jewelry retailer that sells engagement rings, diamonds and watches, including Rolex, among other luxury product and is currently owned by Warren Buffett's Berkshire Hathaway. It was established in Seattle, Washington, in 1912 and currently operates over 30 stores in the United States.

== History ==
In 1912, a watchmaker named Samuel Silverman opened his first store in downtown Seattle. Silverman's son-in-law Ben Bridge joined the firm as a partner in 1922; Ben later purchased Sam's firm and renamed it Ben Bridge Jeweler. Since then, the company has expanded to over 70 retail stores in 11 different states, primarily in the western United States. In May 2000, Ben Bridge Jeweler was acquired by Berkshire Hathaway. Today, the company continues to be family-operated and is currently managed by Ben's great-granddaughter Lisa Bridge.

In 2022, Ben Bridge announced plans to build a new flagship store in Downtown Seattle at a former Gap store on Pine Street, adjacent to Westlake Center. A historic Ben Bridge street clock was planned to be moved from Pike Street to the new store, but during construction of its new foundation in April 2023, contractors pierced the roof of Westlake station under Pine Street and caused major disruptions to Link light rail service.

== See also ==
- O'Shea Building (Seattle)
