= University Link tunnel =

Rail tunnel in Seattle, Washington, United States

Coordinates: 47°37′11.48″N 122°19′13.02″W

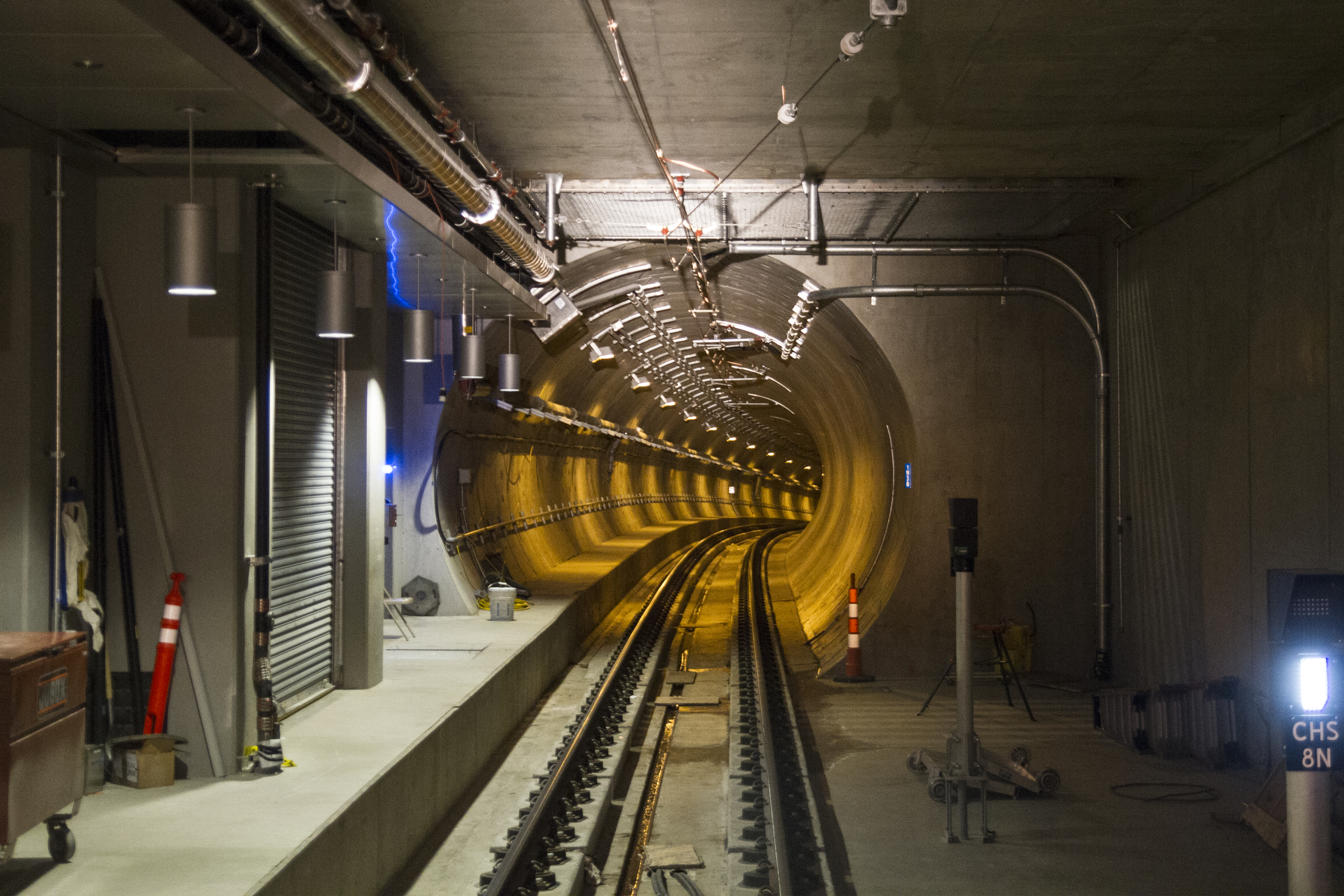
- A section of tunnel at Capitol Hill station
- Interactive map of University Link tunnel

Overview
- Line: 1 Line; 2 Line
- Location: Seattle, Washington
- Status: Active
- Start: Downtown Seattle Transit Tunnel
- End: University of Washington station

Operation
- Constructed: 2009–12
- Opened: March 19, 2016
- Owner: Sound Transit
- Traffic: Link light rail

Technical
- Length: 3.15 mi (5.07 km)
- No. of tracks: Double
- Track gauge: 4 ft 8 1/2 in (1,435 mm)
- Tunnel clearance: 21 ft (6.4 m)
- Width: 21 ft (6.4 m)

The University Link tunnel is a 3.15-mile (5.07 km) light rail tunnel in Seattle, Washington, United States. The twin-bore tunnel carries Link light rail service on the 1 Line and 2 Line from the Downtown Seattle Transit Tunnel to University of Washington station via Capitol Hill station. It was constructed as part of the University Link Extension of Central Link (now the 1 Line) from 2009 to 2012. The 21 ft-wide (6.4 m) tunnels are lined with precast gasketed concrete segments connected with steel bolts and was excavated using three tunnel-boring machines in 2011 and 2012. Light rail service began on March 19, 2016.

== Planning and funding ==
Construction of light rail was originally proposed in the 1996 Sound Move measure, with plans to open a line from Seattle–Tacoma International Airport to the University District in 2006. However, Sound Transit in the 1990s was plagued with continually escalating costs, include an agreement with the University of Washington to install dampeners on the rails that run under the science buildings, air cushions to tables in the science buildings, and to mitigate environmental impacts due to construction and traffic impacts from having the station on university grounds. In 1999, Sound Transit chose their preferred route for the light rail system, including a 4.5-mile-long (7.2 km) tunnel between downtown, First Hill, Capitol Hill and the University District with a crossing under Portage Bay; the tunnel under Portage Bay was later deemed too costly and risky in 2000, and later dropped in favor of alternative options crossing the Montlake Cut. Due to many missteps, Sound Transit shortened the line in 2001 from the original 21 miles (34 km) to 14 miles (23 km), truncating the line to Downtown Seattle. In 2004, Sound Transit selected a route for tunneled light rail extensions through Capitol Hill and the University District and towards Northgate, using the Montlake Cut and a new station at Husky Stadium.

Sound Transit began the federal grant process in August 2005 for a US$750 million grant that would allow Sound Transit to build the $1.9 billion project to connect the University of Washington and Capitol Hill to Downtown Seattle without increasing local taxes. In November 2005, the line received the Federal Transit Administration's (FTA) best rating of "High". During a visit in November 2006 by Transportation Secretary Mary Peters and Senator Patty Murray, it was announced that the line had passed its third of four milestones to get the grant when it received federal approval to complete its final design. In January 2009, the FTA announced that they would finance $830 million of the cost for the construction of the line after Sound Transit agreed to add $127 million in contingency amounts to cover unseen costs of the tunneling.

After years of negotiations, Sound Transit reached an agreement on disruption and construction with the University of Washington in 2007. As part of the agreement, Sound Transit moved the preferred site of the first University station near Husky Stadium and the University of Washington Medical Center, instead of at 15th Avenue NE and NE Pacific Street as selected in 1999. An additional station serving the university was opened in 2021 at NE 45th Street and Brooklyn Avenue NE as part of the Northgate Link Extension, approved by voters in November 2008 as part of the Sound Transit 2 (ST2) package.

== Construction ==
A groundbreaking ceremony for the project was held on March 6, 2009, at the future site of University of Washington station, marking the beginning of University Link construction. The project used three tunnel-boring machines, all sporting a 21-foot-diameter (6.4 m) cutterhead, during construction from May 2011 to May 2012.

Two of the tunnel-boring machines, named "Balto" and "Togo", were manufactured by Herrenknecht in Germany and were launched from the University of Washington station south toward Capitol Hill; each machine weighed 1,109,900 pounds (503,400 kg) and were named after two famous Alaskan husky sled dogs from the 1925 serum run to Nome as a reference to the Washington Huskies athletic program. Another machine, named Brenda, was manufactured by Hitachi Zosen in Japan and was launched twice to complete the tunnels from Capitol Hill station to the Downtown Seattle Transit Tunnel; the 679,500-pound (308,200 kg) machine was later refurbished and used again on the Northgate Link Tunnel from 2014 to 2016.

Light rail service on the University Link Extension began on March 19, 2016. The extension opened six months earlier than scheduled, by using unused float time, and came in $200 million under the $1.9 billion budget.

Cellular service in the tunnel began in August 2016 for T-Mobile customers, provided by an agreement with Mobilitie to install a distributed antenna system during the tunnel's construction.

== Route and design ==
The University Link tunnel begins in Downtown Seattle at the north end of the Downtown Seattle Transit Tunnel under Pine Street at 9th Avenue near Convention Place bus station; the nearest train stop is at Westlake station, five blocks to the west. The tunnel heads northeast along Pine Street in a cut-and-cover tunnel for two blocks until the tunnel-bored segment begins at Boren Avenue underneath Interstate 5. It turns east, dipping south as far as Union Street, before completing a turn northward along Nagle Place into Capitol Hill station, located near Cal Anderson Park and Seattle Central College on Capitol Hill. Leaving the station, University Link Tunnel then turns northeast and descends at a 4.1% grade, reaching its greatest depth under Volunteer Park at 300 feet (91 m) below ground level, before turning northward in the Montlake neighborhood. The tunnel passes 15 feet (4.6 m) under the Montlake Cut while climbing a 4.5% grade to end at University of Washington station near Husky Stadium.

Sound Transit originally estimated that the trip between Westlake and the University of Washington would take 8 minutes, but later refined it to a scheduled 6 minutes. Trains run 20 hours a day on weekdays in the tunnel, arriving every 4 to 5 minutes during rush hour and midday, and every 5 to 8 minutes at other times.

The line originally included a station on First Hill, but due to soil conditions that might increase costs and construction risks, as well as cost-effectiveness requirements, the station was dropped from the route. To mitigate the impact of the cancelled First Hill station, the First Hill Streetcar was built to connect First Hill to the Pioneer Square and International District neighborhoods via Broadway and South Jackson Street; the streetcar began operation in January 2016, months later than anticipated because of delivery issues with the vehicle manufacturer.

The tunnel has a total of 16 cross passages excavated in 2012 and 2013 using the Sequential Excavation Method to connect the two bores at regular intervals for use as emergency exits and maintenance access points. There is one vent for the tunnel, located at a lot adjacent to the Paramount Theatre in Downtown Seattle; a proposed vent in the Montlake neighborhood was removed in 2007 after opposition from nearby residents and a determination that the two stations could handle emergency ventilation on their own.

== Stations ==
Image	Station Name	Opening Year	City/Neighborhood	Location	Platforms	Notes
South via Downtown Seattle Transit Tunnel
	Westlake	1990	Downtown Seattle	4th Avenue & Pine Street	Side	Connections to Seattle Center Monorail and South Lake Union Streetcar.
Continues non-stop through Pine Street Stub Tunnel
	Capitol Hill	2016	Capitol Hill	Broadway & E Denny Way	Center	Connection to First Hill Streetcar
	University of Washington	2016	University District	Montlake Boulevard NE and NE Pacific Street	Center	
North via Northgate Link tunnel
