= Virgil Bogue =

American civil engineer

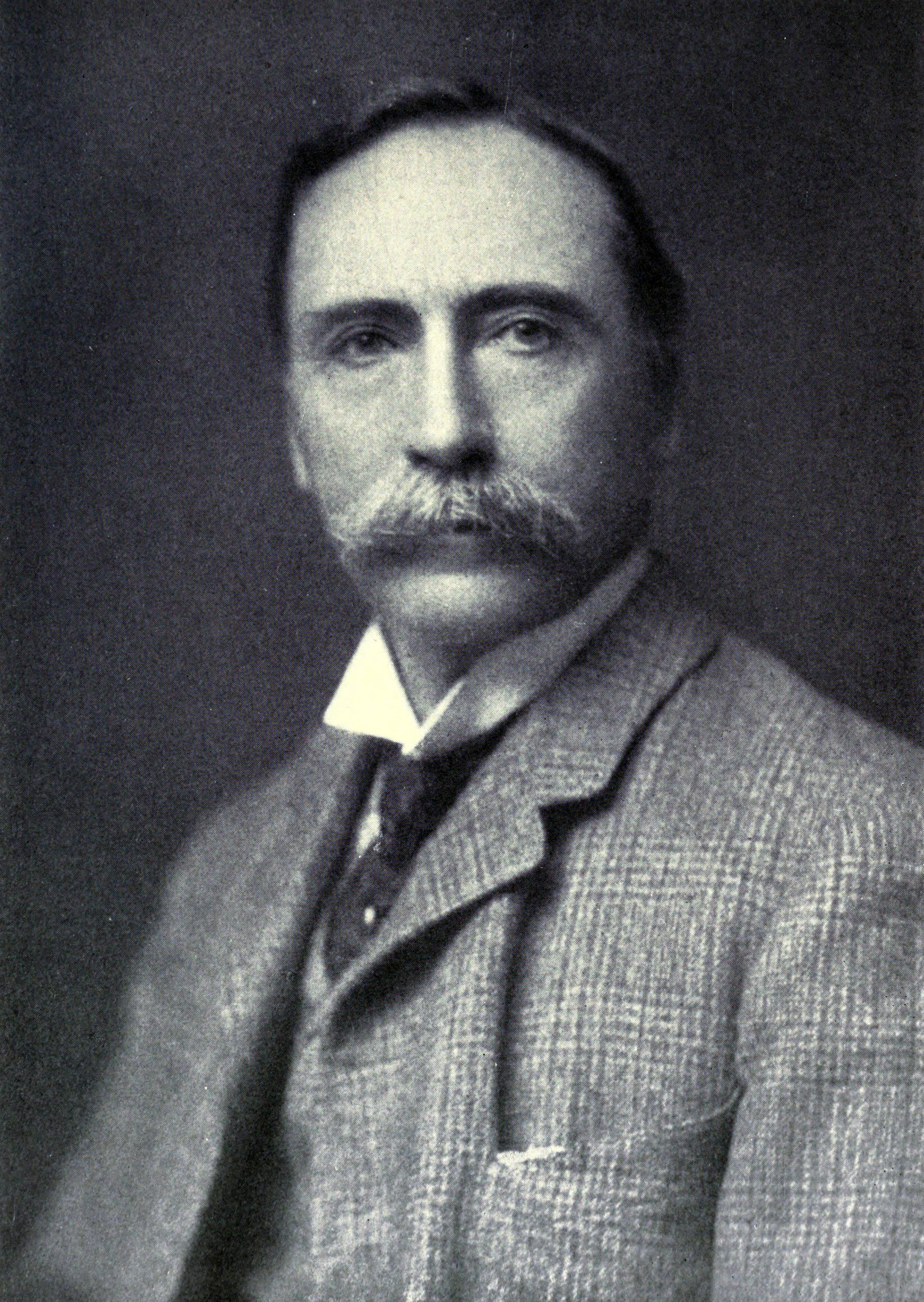
- Born: July 16, 1846; Norfolk, New York, US
- Died: October 14, 1916 (aged 70); At sea (aboard Esperanza)
- Education: Rensselaer Polytechnic Institute
- Occupation: Civil engineer
- Spouse: Sybil Estelle Russell (m. 1872)
- Children: 4
- Relatives: Leslie W. Russell (brother-in-law)

Virgil Gay Bogue (1846–1916) was an American civil engineer who worked initially in his home state of New York before taking jobs internationally and in the western and northwestern United States. He primarily worked for railroads, though also became involved in city planning.

== Civil engineering ==
Bogue was born in Norfolk, New York, on July 16, 1846, the son of George Charles and Mary W. (Perry) Bogue. He received a degree in civil engineering from the Rensselaer Polytechnic Institute in Troy, New York, in 1868.

Bogue worked consecutively on Oroya Railway in Peru to 1879, the Northern Pacific Railway to 1886. On the Northern Pacific, he named Pasco, Washington after a region known for vicious sandstorms he had seen while in South America; built the Northern Pacific and Puget Sound Shore Railroad connecting Tacoma, Washington to Seattle, Washington; and discovered Stampede Pass.

After the Northern Pacific, Bogue served as chief engineer of the Union Pacific Railroad until 1891. Following this, he was also chief engineer on the Western Maryland Railway and headed up the construction of the Western Pacific Railroad through California's rugged Feather River Canyon.

As a consulting engineer, Bogue worked on Columbia River Navigation, Commencement Bay and Grays Harbor, the New Zealand Railway, the New York Department of Public Works, and finally, shortly before his death, the Greater Seattle Plan. Bogue died at sea aboard the steamship Esperanza on October 14, 1916.

His "Bogue Plan" was rejected by voters on March 5, 1912, by a 10,000-vote margin. It would have established Seattle's first comprehensive plan and a variety of improvements, including a civic center in the new Denny Regrade area. The civic center was eventually realized five decades later as Seattle Center, more or less in the location Bogue proposed.
