= Made in USA (sculpture) =

2005 sculpture by Michael Davis in Seattle, Washington, U.S.

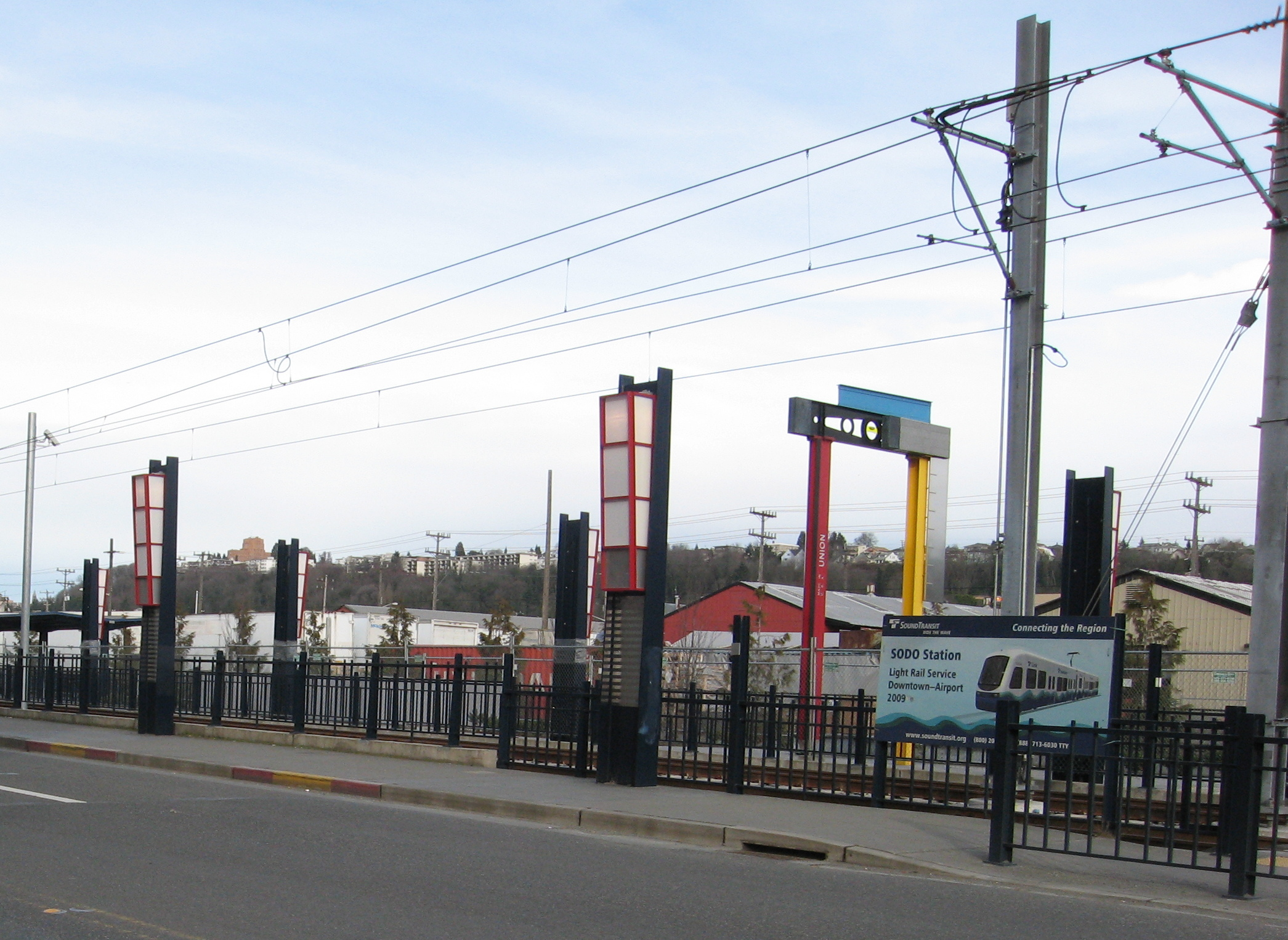
- The sculpture at SoDo station, 2009
- Artist: Michael Davis
- Year: 2005
- Type: Sculpture
- Medium: Steel; bronze
- Subject: Industrial tools
- Dimensions: 24 ft (7.3 m) high, 14 ft (4.3 m) wide
- Location: Seattle, Washington, U.S.
- 47°34′48.5″N 122°19′38.3″W
- Owner: Sound Transit

Made in USA is a 2005 sculpture by American artist Michael Davis, installed at the SODO light rail station in Seattle, in the U.S. state of Washington. It consists of a 24-foot-high (7.3 m) by 14-foot-wide (4.3 m) steel archway as well as a plaza with seating areas. The archway is composed of oversized tools, including a try square, spirit level, and carpenter pencil. The seating area includes benches shaped into I-beams and a cog, with cast bronze replicas of workbench tools soldered onto the granite tops. Both elements honor the industrial legacy of Seattle's SoDo neighborhood by using "tools of the trade".

The archway element of the piece was installed in August 2005 as the first piece of public art on the Central Link line.
