= Sodo (disambiguation) =

Sodo is a city in Ethiopia

Sodo may also refer to:

- SoDo, Seattle, Washington, United States
  - SODO (Link station), a light rail station in SoDo, Seattle
- Sōdō Station, a train station in Shimotsuma, Ibaraki Prefecture, Japan
- Soddo (woreda), in the Gurage Zone, SNNPR, Ethiopia
- Soddo language, a Gurage language spoken in southeastern Ethiopia
- O-Ie Sōdō, noble family disputes within the samurai and aristocratic classes of Japan
- Saut-d'Eau, a municipality in the Centre department of Haiti
