= International District/Chinatown station =

Light rail station in Seattle, Washington

53 International District/Chinatown
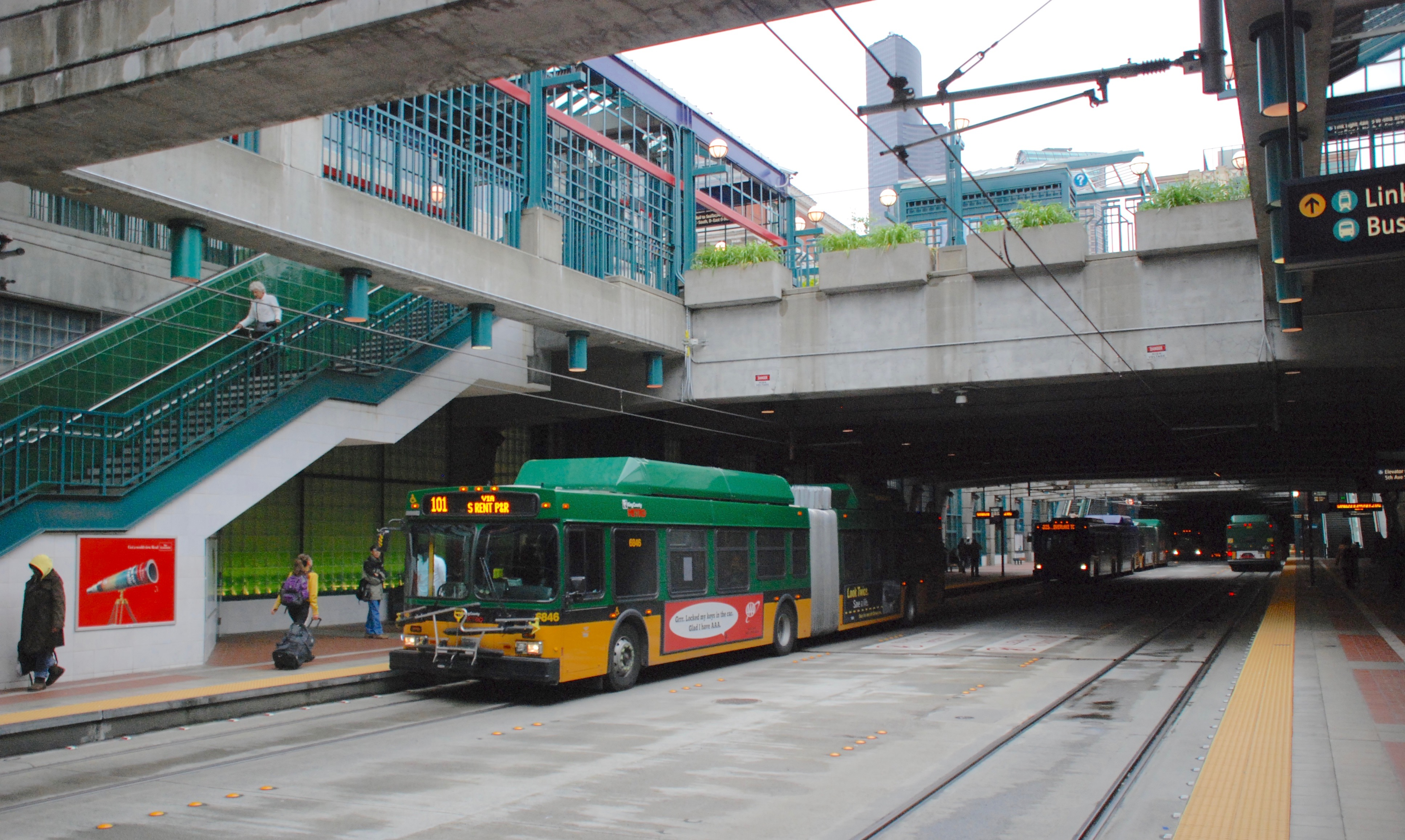
- Platform level view of International District/Chinatown station in 2010

General information
- Location: 5th Avenue S & S Jackson Street; Seattle, Washington; United States
- Coordinates: 47°35′54″N 122°19′41″W
- System: Link light rail
- Owner: Sound Transit
- Platforms: 2 side platforms
- Tracks: 2
- Connections: First Hill Streetcar; King County Metro; Sound Transit Express; Amtrak (at King Street Station); Sounder (at King Street Station)

Construction
- Structure type: Below-grade
- Parking: Pay parking nearby
- Accessible: Yes

History
- Opened: September 15, 1990
- Rebuilt: 2005–2007
- Former names: International District (1990–2004)

Passengers
- 5,701 daily weekday boardings (2025); 2,015,575 total boardings (2025)

Services
Preceding station	Sound Transit	Following station
Link
Pioneer Square toward Lynnwood City Center	1 Line	Stadium toward Federal Way Downtown
Pioneer Square toward Lynnwood City Center	2 Line	Judkins Park toward Downtown Redmond
Preceding station	Seattle Streetcar	Following station
Occidental Mall Terminus	First Hill Streetcar transfer at 5th & Jackson	7th & Jackson toward Broadway & Denny
Former service
Preceding station	Sound Transit	Following station
ST Express
Pioneer Square toward Convention Place	Route 550 DSTT (1999–2019)	Rainier toward Bellevue Transit Center
Location

International District/Chinatown station is a light rail station that is part of the Downtown Seattle Transit Tunnel in Seattle, Washington, United States. The station is located at the tunnel's south end, at 5th Avenue South and South Jackson Street in the Chinatown-International District neighborhood. It is served by the 1 Line and 2 Line of Sound Transit's Link light rail system. The station is located adjacent to Sound Transit headquarters at Union Station, as well as intermodal connections to Amtrak and Sounder commuter rail at King Street Station and the First Hill Streetcar.

International District/Chinatown station comprises two side platforms situated under street level in an open-air structure and adjoining public plaza. It opened on September 15, 1990, as International District station, and was used exclusively by buses until a two-year renovation from 2005 to 2007 to accommodate light rail. Link light rail service to International District/Chinatown station began on July 18, 2009, and bus service ended on March 23, 2019. Trains arrive at the station twenty hours a day on most days, with service every six minutes during peak periods and less frequent service at other times. Since 2026, the station has been the divergence point between the 1 Line and 2 Line, which continues east towards Bellevue and Redmond.

== Location ==
International District/Chinatown station is located along 5th Avenue South between South Jackson and Weller streets, in the Chinatown-International District neighborhood of central Seattle. The station is at the western edge of the neighborhood, and is within walking distance of the Pioneer Square National Historic District. Within 1/2-mile (0.8 km) of the station is an estimated population of 10,412 people in 5,183 housing units, and approximately 43,472 jobs according to the Puget Sound Regional Council.

International District/Chinatown station shares its block with Union Station, the headquarters of Sound Transit. The block also has the Union Station and Opus Center office complex, built on a large concrete lid covering the tunnel and an underground parking garage. To the west of the station on South Jackson Street is historic King Street Station, served by Amtrak and Sounder commuter rail, and the offices of King County Metro at the King Street Center. The Weller Street Bridge connects the station's south plaza to Lumen Field, T-Mobile Park, and Stadium Place, a mixed-use development in a former stadium parking lot. To the station's east is the Historic Chinatown Gate, as well as the flagship store of Asian grocer Uwajimaya.

== History ==
=== Background and earlier proposals ===
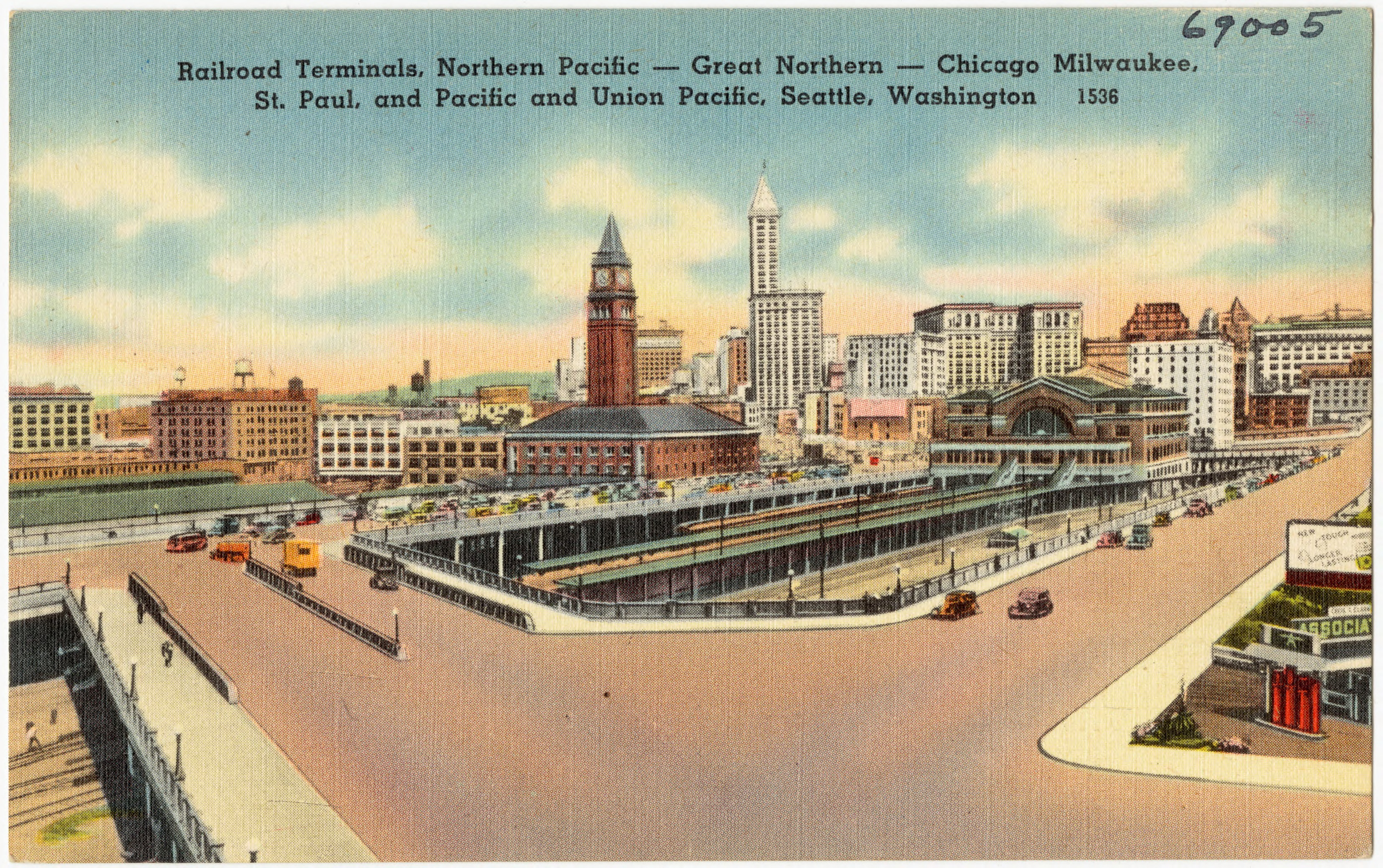
Postcard depiction of King Street Station and Union Station in the late 1930s, including the future site of International District/Chinatown station

The Chinatown-International District of Seattle was established in the early 20th century by Asian Americans who relocated from modern-day Pioneer Square. The regrade of South Jackson Street from 1907 to 1909 paved the way for the development of a new Chinatown along King Street in the 1910s, absorbing the former Chinatown by the end of the 1920s. Adjacent blocks also attracted Japanese and Filipino immigrants and descendants, leading to the use of "International District" to describe the area by the mid-20th century. To the west of the new Chinatown, the city built two passenger rail terminals to replace older facilities on the waterfront: King Street Station, opened in 1906, served the Great Northern Railway and Northern Pacific Railway; Union Station, opened in 1911, served the Milwaukee Road and Union Pacific Railroad. The area around Union Station, originally a tide flat that was filled during the regrades, was home to a coal gasification power plant and later the station's railyard.

In 1911, civil engineer Virgil Bogue presented a comprehensive plan for the city of Seattle, including an elevated rapid transit line running southeast from King Street Station through Chinatown towards the Rainier Valley. The plan was, however, rejected by voters on March 5, 1912, leaving it unimplemented. In 1957, Seattle City Engineer M. O. Anderberg and the Seattle Transit Commission proposed a rapid transit system utilizing the right-of-way cleared for Interstate 5 between Everett and Tacoma. The rapid transit line would travel through downtown Seattle in a tunnel under 5th Avenue, with one of its two stations at South Jackson Street at the site of Union Station. The proposal included redevelopment of Union Station into a multi-level transportation hub, with a bus terminal for intercity and suburban buses, a public parking garage, and a rooftop heliport. The proposal was rejected by the federal government, not wanting to jeopardize freeway construction, and was ultimately shelved.

In the late 1960s, the Forward Thrust Committee put forward a ballot measure to fund a rapid transit system for the Seattle metropolitan area. One of the key components of the system was a downtown subway tunnel on 3rd Avenue terminating at Union Station, where it would split into a south branch to serve Georgetown and Renton, and an east branch to serve Bellevue. The ballot measure, requiring a supermajority to support bonding to augment $385 million in local funding with $765 million from the Urban Mass Transportation Administration, failed to reach the 60 percent threshold in 1968 and again during a second vote in 1970. The failure of the Forward Thrust ballot measures led to the creation of Metro Transit in 1972, operating bus service across King County.

=== Bus tunnel ===
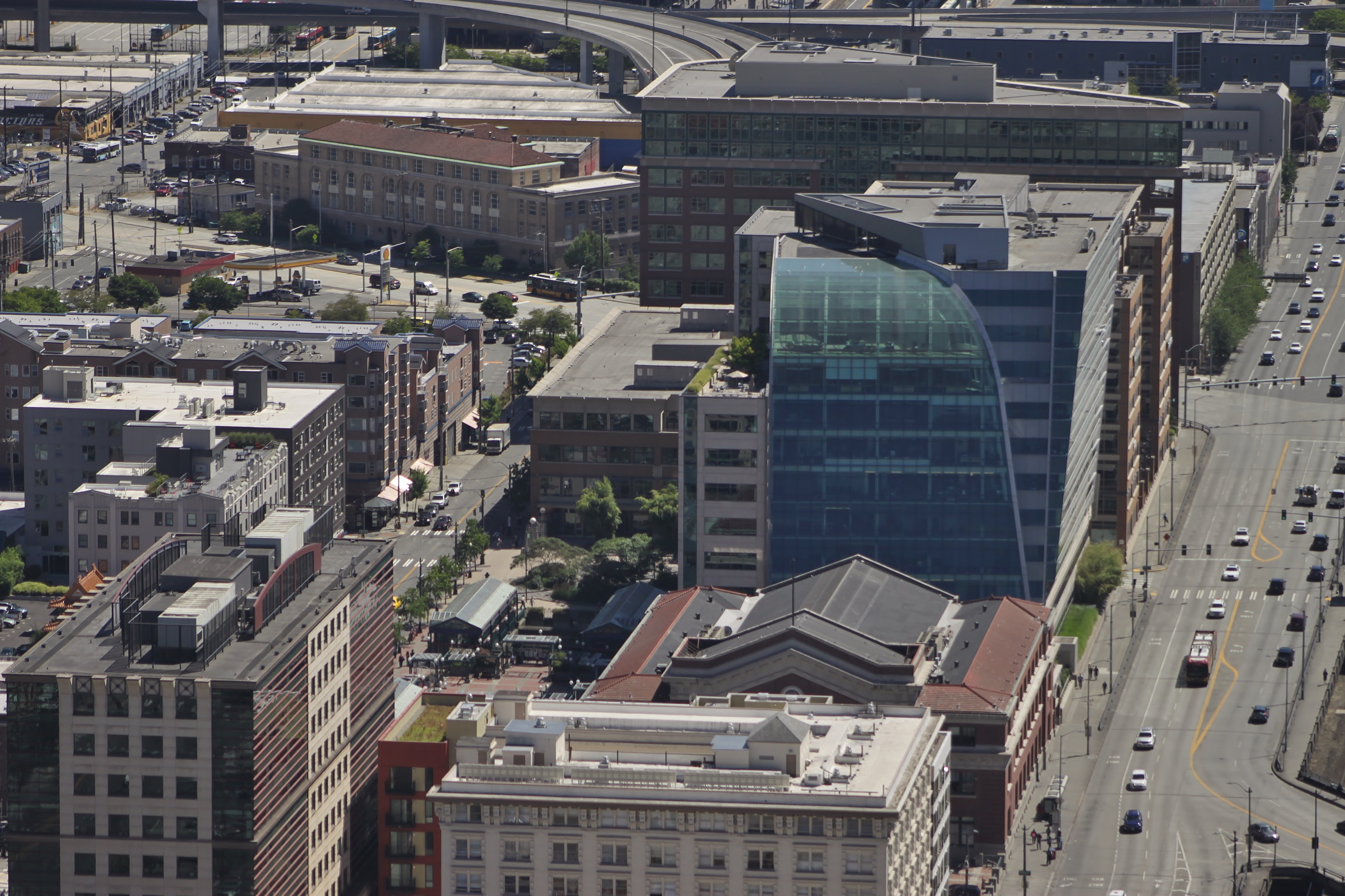
The Union Station office complex and International District/Chinatown station, built atop a shared concrete lid

Metro Transit began planning a bus tunnel through downtown Seattle in the 1970s, to be eventually converted to use by light rail trains. Metro approved the construction of a bus tunnel in 1983, selecting Union Station the tunnel's southern terminus and a route along 3rd Avenue and Pine Street through the rest of downtown. The tunnel would be completed by 1989 and feature public art and stations designed to match the identities of the surrounding area; the tunnel station at Union Station would be designed around an Asian motif reflecting the International District.

The bus tunnel's twin tunnel boring machines were assembled and launched from the site of International District station in May and June 1987, heading north towards the intersection of 3rd Avenue and Pine Street. Most of the station's structure, including a new South Jackson Street bridge over the tunnel, was completed in early 1988. A 90,000 square feet (8,400 m^{2}) concrete lid was built atop the station during construction, designed to support a future office complex. In the late 1990s, developers Vulcan Real Estate and Nitze-Stagen completed the four-building office complex atop the station's western and southern lid.

Tunnel construction was completed in early June 1990, a few weeks before the June 23 completion of the Waterfront Streetcar extension serving the future station. International District station was dedicated at a public open house during the annual Seafair on July 15, 1990. Bus service in the Downtown Seattle Transit Tunnel began on September 15, 1990, with several Metro bus routes moved into the tunnel from surface streets. The tunnel was served by dual-mode buses that would switch from diesel power to electric trolleybus (supplied by overhead wires) at International District station and Convention Place station, the tunnel's respective termini.

=== Light rail ===
In the early 1990s, a regional transit authority (RTA) was formed to plan and construct a light rail system for the Seattle area. After an unsuccessful attempt in 1995, regional voters passed a $3.9 billion plan to build light rail under the RTA in 1996. The downtown transit tunnel had already been planned for eventual light rail use and was built with tracks that would be incorporated into the initial system. The RTA, later renamed Sound Transit, approved the tunnel as part of the route of its initial light rail line in 1999. Ownership of the tunnel, including its stations, was transferred to Sound Transit in 2000 but returned two years later to King County Metro under a joint-operations agreement.

In November 2004, the Metropolitan King County Council approved the renaming of the station to International District/Chinatown station. The renaming came at the behest of Chinese community leaders who had recently campaigned to include "Chinatown" in the names of a new branch library and community center. The new name, implemented during the two-year tunnel closure, came as a compromise between naming the station "Chinatown" and "International District".

The downtown transit tunnel closed on September 23, 2005, for a two-year, $82.7 million renovation to accommodate light rail vehicles. The renovation included the installation of new rails, a lowered roadbed at stations for level boarding, new signalling systems and emergency ventilation. As part of the renovation, the outdoor plaza at International District/Chinatown station was repainted with red accents, replacing the original pink, to better reflect the traditional colors of the neighborhood. The tunnel reopened on September 24, 2007, and Link light rail service began on July 18, 2009, from Westlake station to Tukwila International Boulevard station.

Bus service within the downtown transit tunnel ended on March 23, 2019, with a ceremonial "last run" beginning and ending at International District/Chinatown station after midnight. The tunnel closure was necessitated by expansion of the Washington State Convention Center at the site of Convention Place station, along with upcoming light rail construction in 2020. The remaining bus routes were moved to nearby surface stops on 2nd, 4th, and 5th avenues, while the tunnel became exclusive to light rail trains. Ownership of the tunnel was transferred to Sound Transit in 2022. The 2 Line entered simulated service on February 14, 2026, with passengers able to board trains from Lynnwood to International District/Chinatown. Full service began on March 28 with a celebration at the station and other areas along the 2 Line corridor. The new service required the construction of a turnback track between the existing tracks and platforms, as well as reconfiguration of other tracks in the former bus layover area. A train attempting to use the turnback track derailed as it entered the station on August 1, 2026, leading to several hours of canceled service within Downtown Seattle on both lines.

=== Future ===
As part of the Sound Transit 3 program, approved by voters in 2016, International District/Chinatown station will be the terminus of a second downtown light rail tunnel, running under 5th Avenue and towards South Lake Union. The tunnel, part of a line serving Lower Queen Anne and Ballard, is scheduled to open in 2036. Alternative options for the tunnel include platforms under Union Station or 4th Avenue to facilitate transfers at King Street Station, with a shallow platform at 80 to 90 feet (24 to 27 m) or a deeper platform at 200 feet (61 m) depending on the option. The expected multi-year disruption associated with constructing a station at either location has led to community opposition and delays in planning the final alignment for the project. Some community activists have proposed a no-build alternative to prevent displacement, which earned the support of boardmember Joe McDermott.

A request to study a new option to build a transfer platform adjacent to Pioneer Square station was introduced by Seattle mayor Bruce Harrell in 2022. A second station on the south side of the Chinatown–International District would be built near South Dearborn Street at 6th Avenue South. The concept had been introduced by Greg Smith, a real estate developer who owns land at the proposed south station site that he had planned to redevelop into offices and retail. The King County government also announced plans to redevelop its civic campus near Pioneer Square station into a mixed-use neighborhood centered around the north station in the new option. The proposed "north–south" option was opposed by local residents, who formed a citizens' group to organize protests at Sound Transit board meetings; the board voted to continue studying the option but declined to select a preferred alternative in March 2023. A study into the three remaining alternatives—under 4th Avenue at King Street Station, the north–south split stations, and a revived "diagonal" station east of 5th Avenue—was published in November 2024. A preferred alternative is planned to be selected by the Sound Transit board in 2025.

== Station layout ==
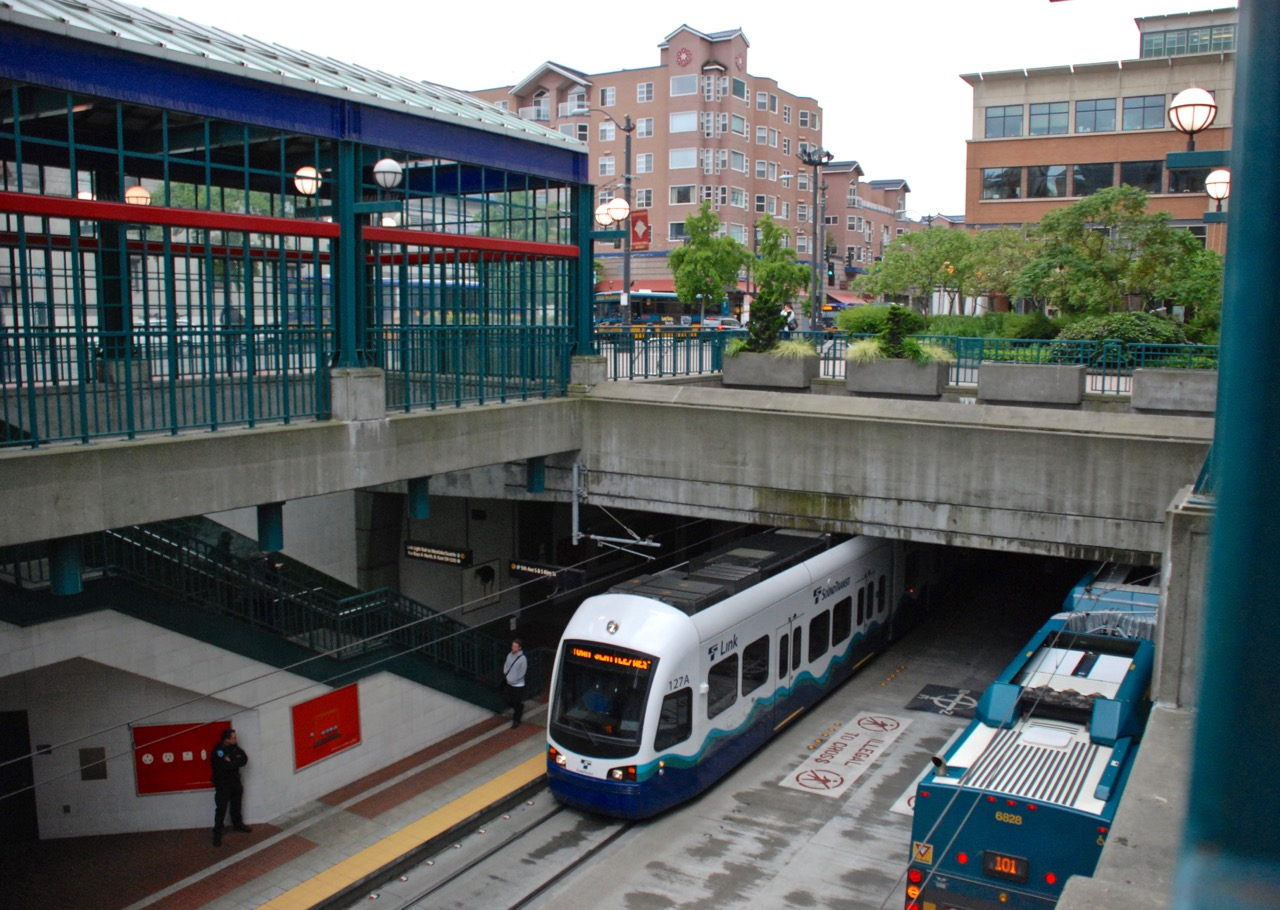
View of International District/Chinatown station from the plaza level, open to the platforms below

International District/Chinatown station consists of two side platforms below street level, partially covered by a lid with a public plaza. The station is 1,060 feet (320 m) long and 82 feet (25 m) wide, including a bus layover area and operations facility to the south of the platforms. It has two entrances, at South Jackson Street to the north and South Weller Street to the south, that are connected to the platform via a series of four elevators, four escalators, and stairs. The Weller Street entrance also includes a pedestrian corridor traveling west from the station to King Street Station's Sounder commuter rail platforms, as well as Lumen Field and Pioneer Square. Transfers between the 1 Line and 2 Line in some directions require passengers to ascend to the plaza level and change platforms.

The station was designed by architect Gary Hartnett in an Asian motif, intending to create a "gathering place" for the neighborhood as a whole. Along with the rest of the downtown transit tunnel stations, International District/Chinatown station was designed with integrated public artwork, coordinated by lead artists Alice Adams and Sonya Ishii. The plaza level includes seating areas, covered shelters for seller's booths, and a small wooden stage modeled after the architecture of traditional Japanese homes. The plaza is paved with bricks arranged with symbols of the Chinese zodiac in the style of traditional Coast Salish depictions of animals. Other areas of the plaza have steel trellises with grown ivy and a pair of etched poems about Asian railroad laborers. At the north end of the plaza are two kiosks with clay tiles depicting legends and stories from Native American, Asian, and African cultures, created by elementary school students from Beacon Hill. The platform level's east wall has a series of nine painted steel origami patterns by Ishii, called the "Paper Chase"; the origami depicts the phases of the moon and blooming of a cherry blossom. The entrance stairways between the platform and plaza levels are also adorned with quotations from Philippine writer Jose Rizal, poet Eve Triem, Chinatown merchant Chin Gee Hee, and University of Washington professor Teresa Schmid McMahon.

The station's former pictogram, a Chinese dragon, pays homage to the various cultures of the International District neighborhood. It was created in 2009 by Christian French as part of the Stellar Connections series and its points represented nearby destinations, including Union Station, the Wing Luke Museum of the Asian Pacific American Experience, and Hing Hay Park. The pictogram series was retired in 2024 and replaced by station numbers, with 53 assigned to International District/Chinatown station.

== Services ==
International District/Chinatown station is at the southern end of the Downtown Seattle Transit Tunnel, which is served by the Link light rail system's 1 Line and 2 Line. The two lines share tracks from Lynnwood to Downtown Seattle with intermediate stops on the University of Washington campus. From International District/Chinatown, they diverge; the 1 Line continues south to Seattle–Tacoma International Airport and Federal Way, while the 2 Line travels east to Bellevue and Redmond. International District/Chinatown is situated between Pioneer Square and Stadium stations; it is the twelfth southbound station from Lynnwood City Center, the terminus of both lines. Link light rail trains serve the station 20 hours a day on weekdays and Saturdays, from 5:00 a.m. to 12:00 a.m.; and 18 hours on Sundays, from 6:00 a.m. to 12:00 a.m. During regular weekday service, trains on each line operate roughly every eight minutes during rush hour, ten minutes during midday operation, and twelve to fifteen minutes in the early morning and at night. On weekends, trains on each line arrive at International District/Chinatown station every ten minutes during midday hours and every twelve to fifteen minutes during mornings and evenings. The two lines combine for frequencies of four minutes during rush hour and five minutes during midday and weekend service. The station is approximately 37 minutes from Lynnwood City Center station, 22 minutes from Bellevue Downtown station, and 31 minutes from SeaTac/Airport station. In 2025, an average of passengers boarded Link trains at International District/Chinatown station on weekdays.

The station is also in close proximity to several other regional and local transit services at adjacent facilities and stops. King Street Station is located one block west of International District/Chinatown station and is served by inter-city Amtrak trains on the Cascades, Coast Starlight, and Empire Builder, as well as Sounder commuter trains to Everett, Tacoma, and Lakewood. The First Hill Streetcar stops one block east of the station's north entrance on South Jackson Street, connecting the area to Little Saigon, Yesler Terrace, First Hill, and Capitol Hill. The Waterfront Streetcar also served the station, using a separate platform on 5th Avenue South, until service was suspended in 2005. Intercity bus operator BoltBus used a curbside stop near the station for its intercity routes serving Vancouver and Portland, Oregon, until it ceased operations in 2021.

Several surface bus stops near the station on South Jackson Street, 2nd Avenue, and 4th Avenue are served by King County Metro and Sound Transit Express routes. Metro's routes on Jackson Street include local service to the Central District, Beacon Hill, Rainier Valley, Capitol Hill, and the University District. The stops on 2nd Avenue and 4th Avenue serve express routes to southern King County, Pierce County, and Everett. During disruptions to light rail service, King County Metro runs a special route between all affected stations, which stops at South Jackson Street to serve the station. A seasonal shuttle that serves the Seattle waterfront on Alaskan Way during the summer begins at International District/Chinatown station and connects to Colman Dock and the Seattle Center campus.

From 2009 to 2019, several bus routes also ran in the tunnel alongside light rail trains. The final set of seven bus routes in the tunnel were divided into three bays by their outbound direction: Bay A was served by three routes (routes 41, 74, and 255) heading north toward Northgate and the University District and east towards Kirkland; Bay C was served by three routes (routes 101, 102, and 150) heading south through the SODO Busway toward Kent and Renton; and Bay D was served by one route (Sound Transit Express route 550) heading east via Interstate 90 to Bellevue.
