= Supernova (nightclub) =

Nightclub in Seattle, Washington, U.S.

Coordinates: 47°34′28″N 122°20′1″W

- Interactive map of Supernova
- Location: SoDo, Seattle, Washington, United States
- Type: Nightclub

Construction
- Opened: 2021

Supernova is a nightclub in SoDo, Seattle, in the U.S. state of Washington. The venue opened in 2021.

The venue has hosted events organized by Sapphic Seattle. Supernova has also hosted the drag competition and dance party Fruit Bowl.
