= Industrial District, Seattle =

- Seattle Neighborhood
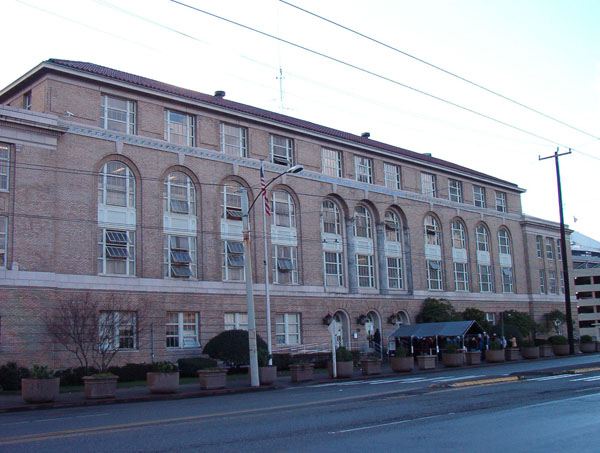
- The old immigration building at the northern end of the neighborhood on Airport Way S.

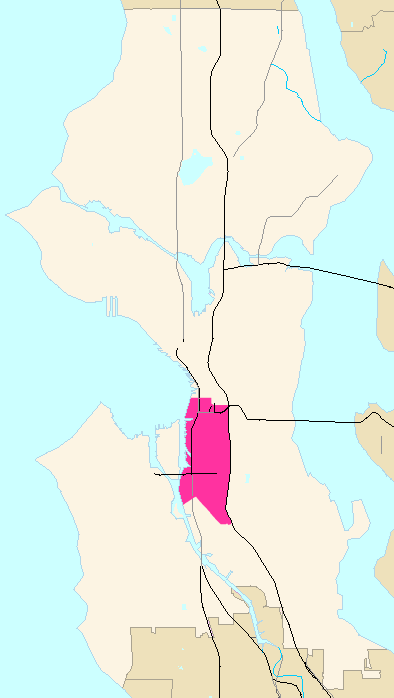
- Industrial District Highlighted in Pink
- Coordinates: 47°33′49″N 122°20′04″W
- Country: United States
- State: Washington
- County: King
- City: Seattle
- ZIP Code: 98134
- Area code: 206, 564

The Industrial District is a neighborhood and the principal industrial area of Seattle, Washington. It is bounded on the west by the Duwamish River and Elliott Bay, beyond which lies Delridge of West Seattle; on the east by Interstate 5, beyond which lies Beacon Hill; on the north by S King and S Dearborn Streets, beyond which lie Pioneer Square and southwest International District of Downtown; and on the south by the main lines of the BNSF Railway and Union Pacific Railroad, or about S Lucille Street, beyond which is Georgetown. SoDo is the name of the northwest portion of the neighborhood, named for its being South of Downtown. SoDo is the location of T-Mobile Park, home of the Seattle Mariners, and Lumen Field, home of the Seattle Seahawks and Seattle Sounders FC. Lumen Field was also the site of the former Kingdome.

The Industrial District may also be defined by land use, with the primarily residential and open space Delridge district extending west from W Marginal Way SW and south of SW Spokane Street, and with the heavy industrial-zoned lower Duwamish River east of Marginal and north of Spokane as part of the Industrial District.

Most of the Industrial District is built on what was once the mudflats and lowlands of Elliott Bay and the Duwamish estuary, dredged, straightened, and filled 1902 and 1907. Much of the area is also built on landfill which is prone to liquefaction. This makes buildings in this area highly prone to earthquake damage.

Principal arterials are First and Fourth Avenues S, Alaskan Way, East Marginal and Airport Ways S (north- and southbound); and S Spokane, the Spokane Street Viaduct, West Seattle Bridge, and S Royal Brougham Way (east- and westbound; Royal Brougham was formerly S Atlantic Street). Minor arterials are 6th Avenue S, S Holgate and S Lander Streets, and S Industrial Way.

== History ==
What is now Seattle has been inhabited since the end of the last glacial period (c. 8,000 BCE—10,000 years ago). For example, the villages of tohl-AHL-too ("herring house") and later hah-AH-poos ("where there are horse clams") at the then-mouth of the Duwamish River in what is now the Industrial District, had been inhabited since the 6th century CE. The Dkh^{w}’Duw’Absh and Xacuabš ("People of the Inside" and "People of the Large Lake", now the Duwamish tribe) of the Lushootseed (Whulshootseed, Skagit-Nisqually) Coast Salish nations inhabited at least 17 villages in the mid-1850s, living in some 93 permanent longhouses (khwaac'ál'al) along Elliott Bay, Salmon Bay, Portage Bay, Lake Washington, Lake Sammamish, and the Duwamish, Black, and Cedar rivers.

In 1905 the Seattle Box Company relocated to the southeast corner of 4th Avenue S and S Spokane Street becoming one of the first residents of the Industrial District.

Starbucks moved its world headquarters to the Industrial District in 1997, occupying the 1912 building constructed for Sears, Roebuck and Company as a catalog distribution center.

Some current industrial business owners are concerned about the future of the Industrial District. The area is seen by some city developers as an ideal zone in which to expand non-industrial businesses and residential land use south of Downtown Seattle.

== Economy ==
Uwajimaya has its headquarters in the Industrial District.
