= Opus Center =

Office buildings in Seattle, Washington, United States

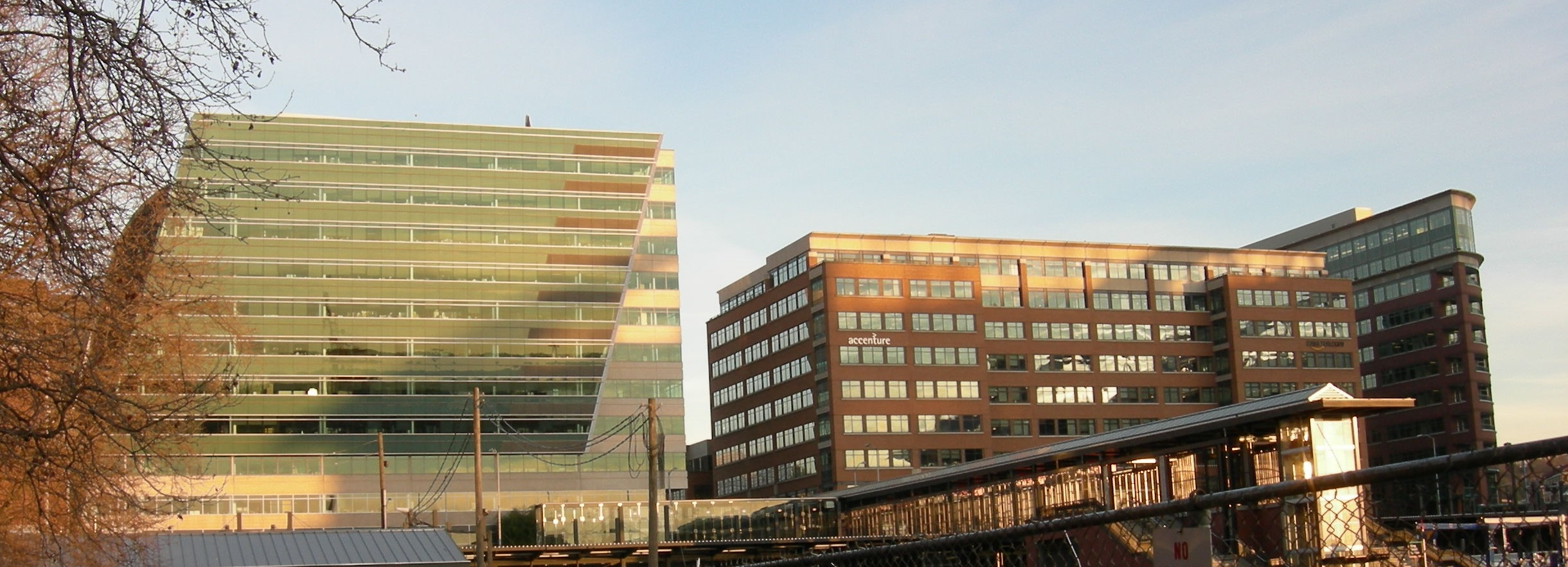
- Opus Center (right) and adjacent 505 Union Station

- Location within Downtown Seattle

General information
- Location: 625 Fifth Avenue South (Opus Center East); 605 Fifth Avenue South (Opus Center West); 705 Fifth Avenue South (Opus Center South), Seattle
- Coordinates: 47.597°N 122.328°W

Design and construction
- Architect: Andre Bilokur
- Architecture firm: NBBJ
- Structural engineer: Coughlin Porter Lundeen
- Civil engineer: Coughlin Porter Lundeen

Opus Center is a set of four office buildings built in Downtown Seattle. The structures, completed in 2000 or 2001, are four, nine and eleven stories tall, and two of them are constructed on a lid over the underground Chinatown transit station, completed in 1985. Until 2011 it was the headquarters of Amazon.com.

== Engineering details ==
The building's engineering is unusual because of the placement over the transit tunnel, and for other reasons. Part of the structure is cantilevered over the 1985 load-bearing columns that did not match the later building's design. Because of the tunnel, four buildings are designed as one seismic unit, including a rubber membrane serving as a joint between all the buildings and 505 Union Station. It was the first building in Seattle with perimeter moment frame design since the 1994 Northridge earthquake, which exposed national safety concerns requiring re-review of this technique.
