= SODO station (Sound Transit) =

Light rail station in Seattle, Washington

55 SODO
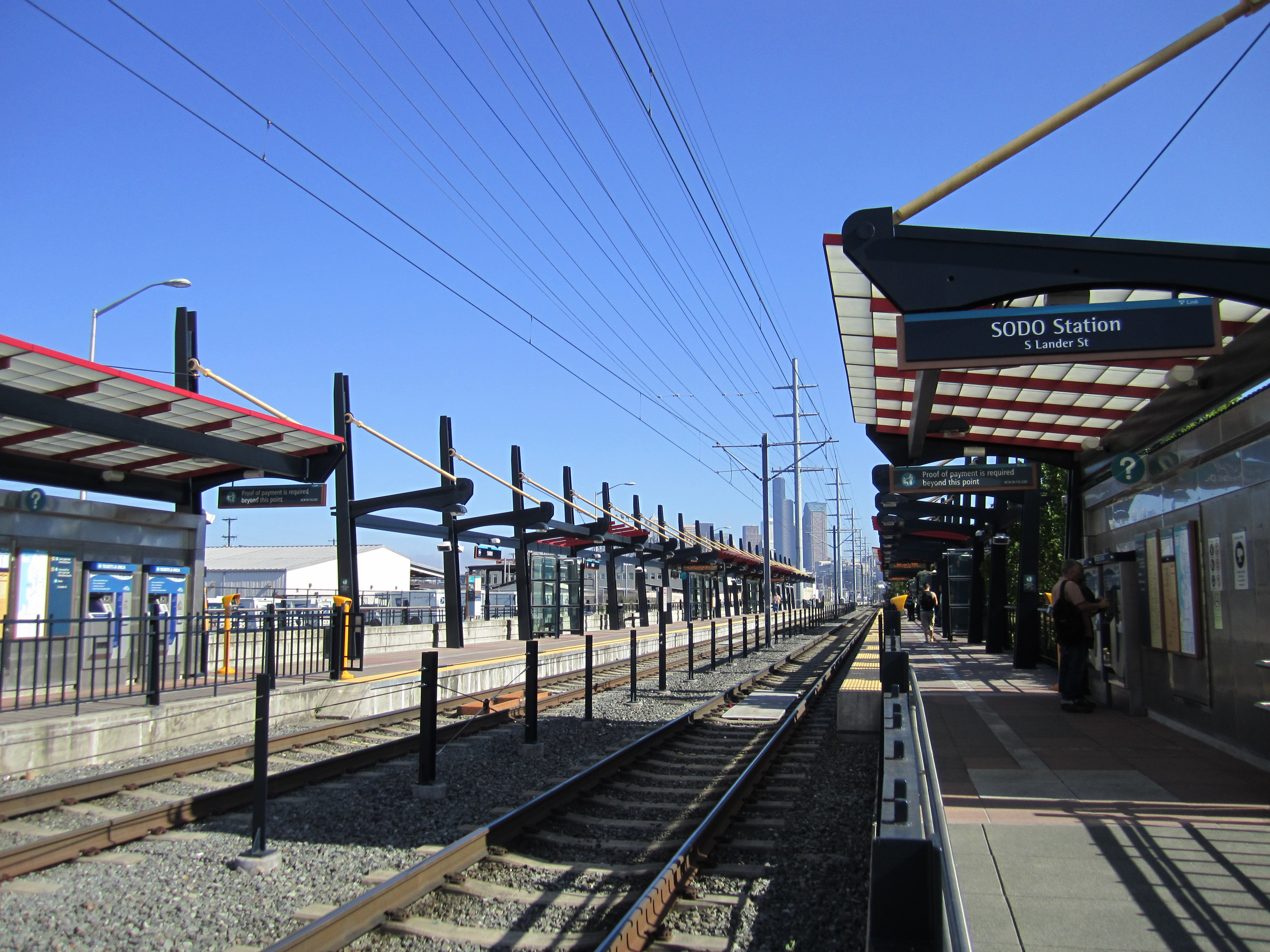
- The northbound platform at SODO station

General information
- Location: 500 South Lander Street; Seattle, Washington; United States
- Coordinates: 47°34′52.6″N 122°19′38.6″W
- System: Link light rail
- Owner: Sound Transit
- Platforms: 2 side platforms
- Tracks: 2
- Connections: Sound Transit Express, King County Metro

Construction
- Structure type: At-grade
- Parking: Paid parking nearby
- Cycle facilities: Lockers
- Accessible: Yes

History
- Opened: July 18, 2009

Passengers
- 2,055 daily weekday boardings (2025); 761,664 total boardings (2025)

Services
Preceding station	Sound Transit	Following station
Link
Stadium toward Lynnwood City Center	1 Line	Beacon Hill toward Federal Way Downtown
Location

SODO station is a light rail station located in Seattle, Washington. It is situated between the Beacon Hill and Stadium stations on the 1 Line, which runs from Seattle–Tacoma International Airport to Downtown Seattle and the University of Washington as part of the Link light rail system. The station consists of two at-grade side platforms at the intersection of the SODO Busway and South Lander Street in the SoDo neighborhood of Seattle.

SODO station was first proposed in the late 1980s but was ignored in subsequent light rail proposals until the addition of the Beacon Hill Tunnel to the Central Link route in 1998 (now part of the 1 Line). It was built between 2005 and 2006 by Kiewit Pacific and opened to Link service on July 18, 2009. Trains serve the station twenty hours a day on most days; the headway between trains is eight minutes during peak periods, with less frequent service at other times. SODO station is also served by several Sound Transit Express and King County Metro buses that stop on the SODO Busway adjacent to the platforms.

== Location ==
SODO station is situated along the SODO Busway in the SoDo neighborhood of Seattle. The entrances to its two side platforms is located at the intersection of the SODO Busway and South Lander Street, adjacent to a United States Postal Service parking garage. The area surrounding the station consists of a mixture of industrial and low-density commercial areas without residences, employing over 12,000 workers. Major employers in the area include Starbucks, who has their headquarters at the Starbucks Center five blocks west of the station, and Seattle Public Schools at the John Stanford Center. The light rail line is paralleled to the east by a mixed-use bicycle trail called the SODO Trail, which connects SODO station to Stadium station at South Royal Brougham Way. The Seattle Department of Transportation plans to extend the trail to Spokane Street, connecting it to a bike trail on the Spokane Street Viaduct, serving West Seattle; a connector trail on Forest Street to a segregated cycletrack on Airport Way is also being considered.

== History ==
The earliest proposal for a light rail station at South Lander Street in SODO came from the Puget Sound Council of Governments in 1986, as part of a north–south line from Lynnwood to Federal Way, following the Duwamish River from Downtown Seattle to the Seattle–Tacoma International Airport. The station was omitted from the 1993 Regional Transit Project proposal, and the two Sound Transit proposals in 1995 and 1996, with the latter being approved to follow Interstate 90 toward the Rainier Valley. Sound Transit added several alternative routes to Central Link in 1998, including "Route C1" consisting of an at-grade segment parallel to the existing SODO Busway and a tunnel under Beacon Hill, with stations at South Royal Brougham Way, South Lander Street and under Beacon Hill. "Route C1" was selected as the final route for Central Link (now the 1 Line) in 1999, with a station at South Lander Street being approved ahead of the deferred Royal Brougham and Beacon Hill stations.

A groundbreaking ceremony for the Central Link project was held at SODO station in November 2003, with construction beginning after utility poles located next to the SODO Busway were relocated to clear the track's right of way. The Sound Transit Board officially named the station after the SoDo neighborhood on January 13, 2005, replacing the provisional name of South Lander Street. The first rails on Central Link were laid between Holgate and Lander streets in August 2005, with the first piece of station art being installed at SODO station during the same month. The station itself was built by Kiewit Pacific in less than a year, with opening ceremonies for SODO and Stadium stations held on May 30, 2006, celebrating the completion of the first two Central Link stations. Light rail testing on the 1.3-mile-long (2.1 km), at-grade SoDo segment was carried out by Sound Transit between March 2007 and February 2008, allowing the agency to declare the segment "substantially complete" in June 2008. SODO station was opened to the public on July 18, 2009, during the first day of Central Link service.

== Station layout ==
SODO station consists of two 400-foot-long (120 m) at-grade side platforms, located 160 feet (49 m) north of the station's entrance at South Lander Street. The station includes the largest bicycle facility in the Link light rail system, with 64 covered spaces at a bicycle parking station and bicycle locker with 32 spaces adjacent to the nearby SODO Trail.

SODO station also houses a free-standing art installation as part of the "STart" program, which allocates a percentage of project construction funds to art projects to be used in stations. Located at east side of the station entrance, Michael Davis's Made in USA consists of a 24-foot-high (7.3 m) by 14-foot-wide (4.3 m) archway that is made of an oversized try square, spirit level, and carpenter pencil, installed in August 2005 to honor the industrial heritage of SoDo. The plaza also includes seating made of sliced steel I-beams and a cog, with cast bronze replicas of workbench tools soldered onto the granite tops; the seating is meant to humanize the industrial environment, illustrating the process of transforming ideas and raw materials into a completed project.

The station's former pictogram, which depicts an anvil

The station's former pictogram, an anvil, recalled the industrial history of the SODO area. It was created by Christian French as part of the Stellar Connections series and its points represented nearby destinations, including the Starbucks Center, the Link railyard, Rainier Brewery, and the Beacon Hill Tunnel. The pictogram series was retired in 2024 and replaced by station numbers.

== Services ==
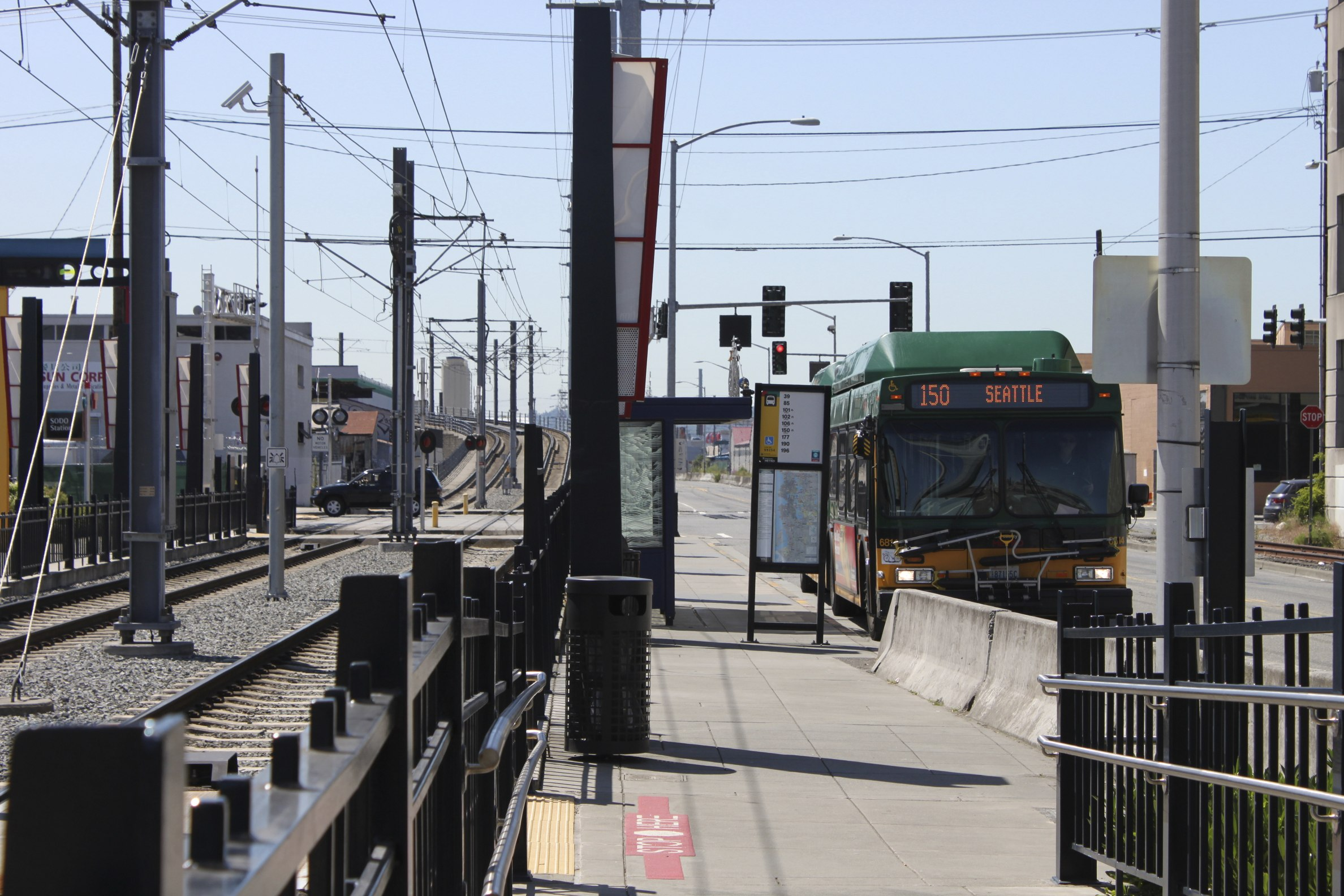
A King County Metro bus stops on the SODO Busway adjacent to the platforms at SODO station.

SODO station is part of Sound Transit's 1 Line, which runs from between Lynnwood, the University of Washington campus, Downtown Seattle, the Rainier Valley, Seattle–Tacoma International Airport, and Federal Way. It is the fourteenth southbound station from Lynnwood City Center and eleventh northbound station from Federal Way Downtown; SODO is situated between Stadium and Beacon Hill stations. Trains serve the station twenty hours a day on weekdays and Saturdays, from 5:00 am to 1:00 am, and eighteen hours on Sundays, from 6:00 am to 12:00 am; during regular weekday service, trains operate roughly every eight to ten minutes during rush hour and midday operation, respectively, with longer headways of twelve to fifteen minutes in the early morning and at night. During weekends, Link trains arrive at SODO station every ten minutes during midday hours and every twelve to fifteen minutes during mornings and evenings. The station is approximately 41 minutes from Lynnwood City Center station, 9 minutes from Westlake station in Downtown Seattle, and 28 minutes from SeaTac/Airport station. In 2025, an average of 2,055 passengers boarded Link trains at SODO station on weekdays.

SODO station is also served by several bus routes on the SODO Busway, which runs parallel to 1 Line, at a pair of bus stops west of the station platforms at South Lander Street. Three Sound Transit Express routes stop at the station on their way to Tacoma, Lakewood, and Gig Harbor. King County Metro operates three all-day routes through the SODO Busway that serve West Seattle, the Rainier Valley, Renton, Tukwila, and Kent. Metro also runs four peak-direction routes through the SODO Busway towards Renton, Fairwood, Federal Way, and Redondo Heights.

In addition to regular bus service, Metro also runs the Route 97 Link Shuttle, a shuttle service serving Link stations along surface streets during Link service disruptions.
