= Stadium station (Sound Transit) =

Light rail station in Seattle, Washington

54 Stadium
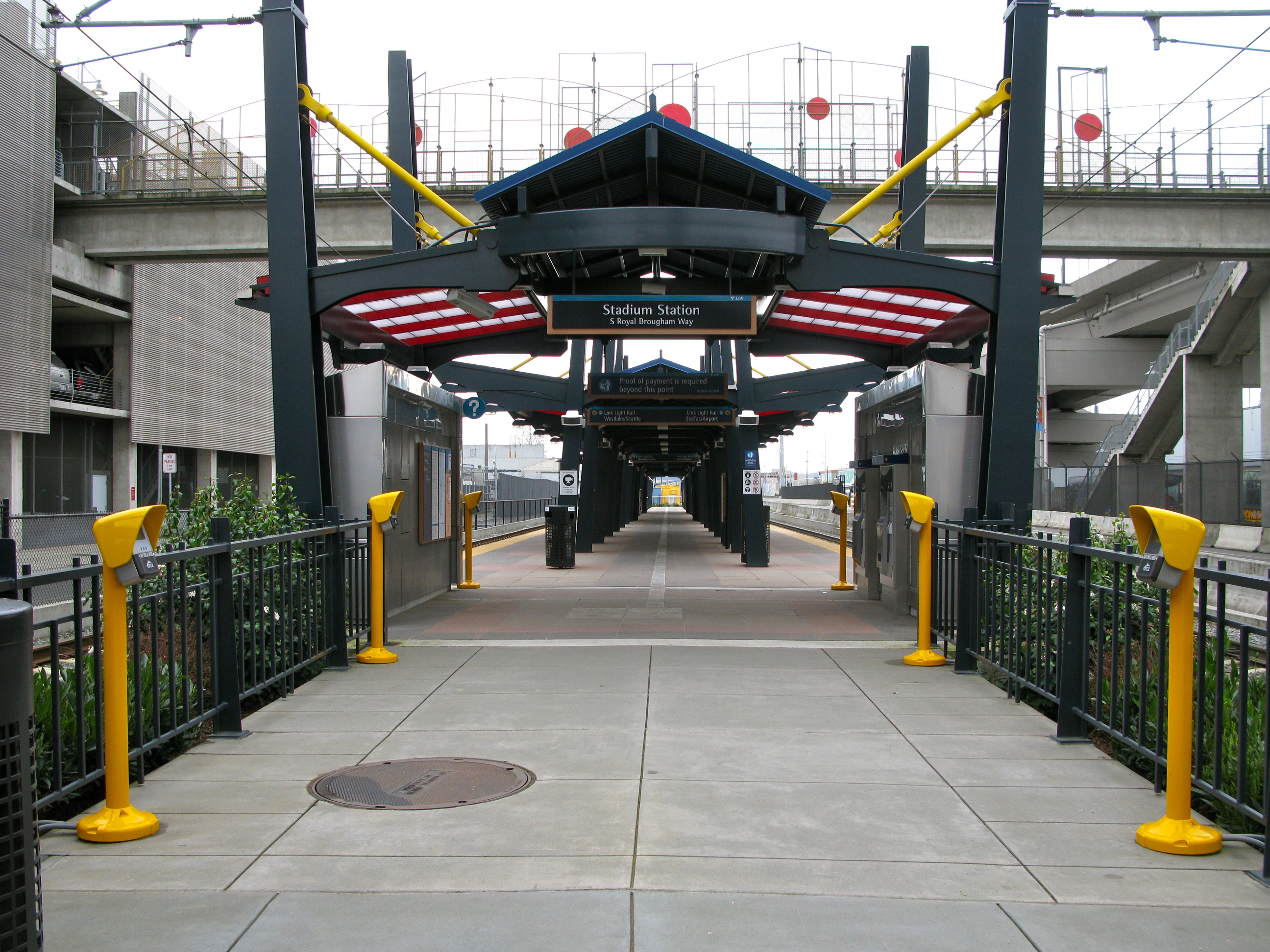
- The entrance to Stadium station, looking south at the ticket vending machines and ORCA card readers

General information
- Location: 501 South Royal Brougham Way; Seattle, Washington; United States
- Coordinates: 47°35′28.8″N 122°19′37.8″W
- System: Link light rail
- Owner: Sound Transit
- Platforms: 1 island platform
- Tracks: 2
- Connections: Sound Transit Express; King County Metro; Greyhound Lines

Construction
- Structure type: At-grade
- Parking: Paid parking nearby
- Accessible: Yes

History
- Opened: July 18, 2009

Passengers
- 2,003 daily weekday boardings (2025); 759,226 total boardings (2025)

Services
Preceding station	Sound Transit	Following station
Link
International District/Chinatown toward Lynnwood City Center	1 Line	SODO toward Federal Way Downtown
Location

Stadium station is a light rail station located in Seattle, Washington. It is situated between the SODO and International District/Chinatown stations on the 1 Line, part of Sound Transit's Link light rail system. The station consists of an at-grade island platform at the intersection of the SODO Busway and South Royal Brougham Way in the SODO neighborhood of Seattle, adjacent to Lumen Field and T-Mobile Park.

Stadium station was proposed in 1998 as part of the segment between the Downtown Seattle and Beacon Hill tunnels and subsequently deferred months later. It was reinstated in 2005 and construction of the station was completed in May 2006, several years before Link light rail service began on July 18, 2009. Trains serve the station twenty hours a day on most days; the headway between trains is eight minutes during peak periods, with less frequent service at other times. Stadium station is also served by several Sound Transit Express and King County Metro buses that stop on the SODO Busway west of the platform, as well as the Seattle Greyhound station east of the platform.

== Location ==
Stadium station is situated at the intersection of the SODO Busway and Royal Brougham Way, under the ramps of Interstate 90, in the SODO neighborhood of Seattle. The station is adjacent to a King County Metro employee parking garage, which includes a pedestrian bridge over the platform to the Metro Ryerson Base, and the Seattle Greyhound bus station. The area surrounding Stadium station contains a mixture of light industrial zoning, primarily home to the manufacturing and warehousing industry employing over 13,000 workers, with some retail uses. Lumen Field and T-Mobile Park are located one block west of the station on the north and south sides of Royal Brougham Way, respectively. The light rail line is paralleled to the east by a mixed-use bicycle trail called the SODO Trail, which connects Stadium station to SODO station at South Lander Street. The Seattle Department of Transportation plans to extend the trail further south to Spokane Street, connecting it to a bike trail on the Spokane Street Viaduct, serving West Seattle.

== History ==
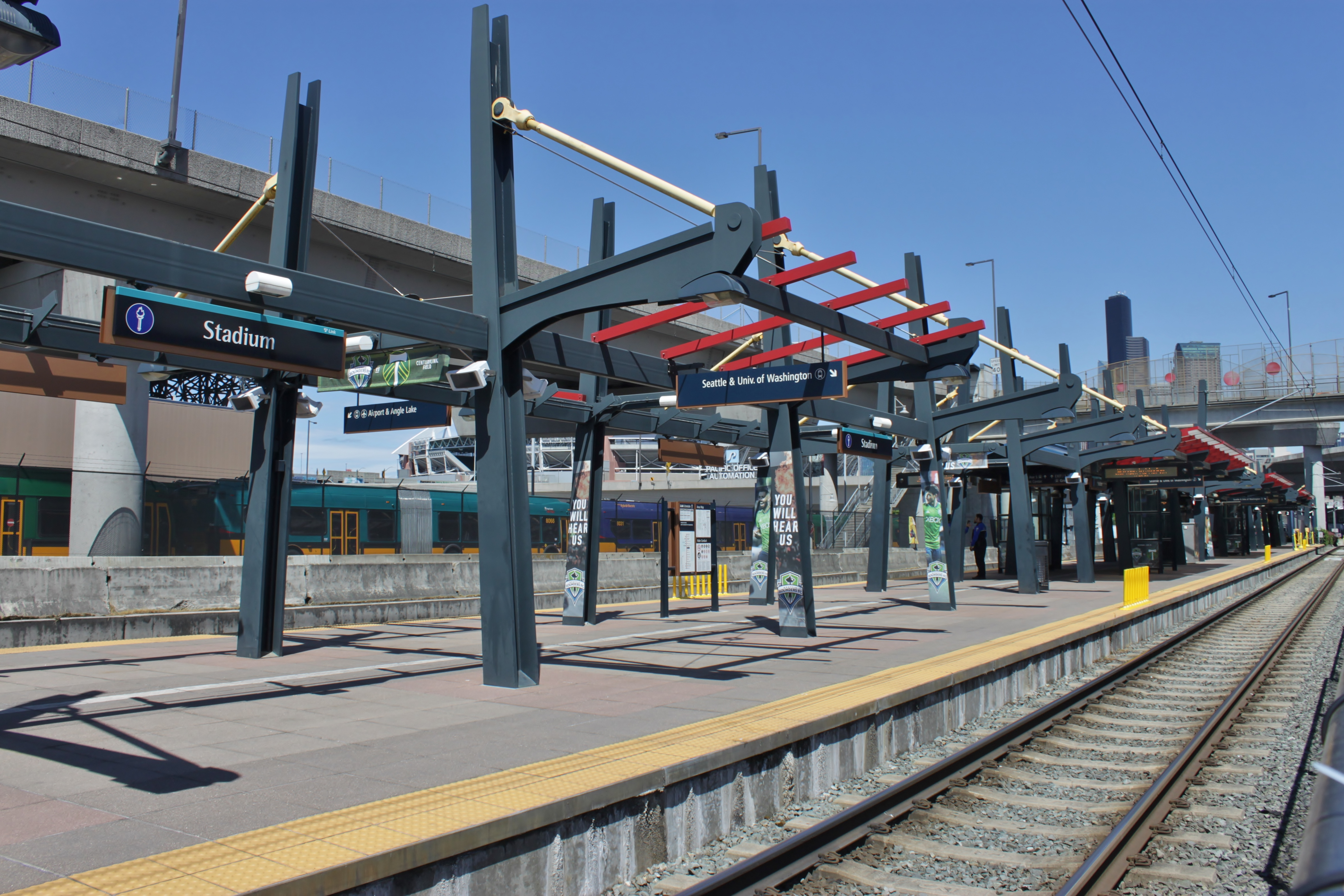
Stadium station from the SODO Trail

Stadium station was not part of the initial Link light rail route approved in 1996, but was created as part of "Route C1" added to Central Link (now the 1 Line) by the Sound Transit Board in 1998. The routing included an at-grade section parallel to the SODO Busway and a tunnel under Beacon Hill, with stations at South Royal Brougham Way, South Lander Street and under Beacon Hill. While "Route C1" was selected as the final Central Link route in 1999, the station at South Royal Brougham Way was deferred, except for the construction of the platform and supports required for an infill station. The Sound Transit Board began studying the re-addition of a station at Royal Brougham Way in late 2004 and approved construction of the newly renamed Stadium station on January 13, 2005, using $3.7 million in surplus funds after bids for the construction of Link Light Rail were lower than budgeted.

Construction of Stadium station began with the laying of the first rails for Central Link, between Holgate and Lander streets, in August 2005. The station itself was built by Kiewit Pacific in less than a year, with opening ceremonies for Stadium and SODO stations held on May 30, 2006, celebrating the completion of the first two Central Link stations. Light rail testing on the 1.3-mile-long (2.1 km), at-grade SoDo segment began in March 2007, and ended in February 2008. Regular Link service from Seattle to Tukwila began on July 18, 2009, including the use of its pocket track to store extra trains serving a sellout friendly match between Seattle Sounders FC and Chelsea at Qwest Field.

The tracks crossing Royal Brougham Way sank by 3 inches (7.6 cm) due to ground settling and caused Link trains to be limited to 5 to 10 miles per hour (8.0 to 16.1 km/h). A track replacement began in August 2023 with trains on the 1 Line suspended for one weekend and single-tracking for several days afterward.

== Station layout ==
Stadium station consists of a single 400-foot-long (120 m), at-grade island platform accessible via an entrance at its north end, 130 feet (40 m) from South Royal Brougham Way. The platform itself has a width of 30 feet (9.1 m) to accommodate event crowds at Lumen Field (formerly CenturyLink Field) and T-Mobile Park (formerly Safeco Field). A pocket track located south of the station was built to store extra trains that are deployed after major sporting events.

The station's former pictogram, which depicts the Olympic Torch

The station's former pictogram was a depiction of the Olympic Torch, a representation of sporting culture. It was created by Christian French as part of the Stellar Connections series and its points represented nearby destinations, including the two stadiums. The pictogram series was retired in 2024 and replaced by station numbers.

== Services ==
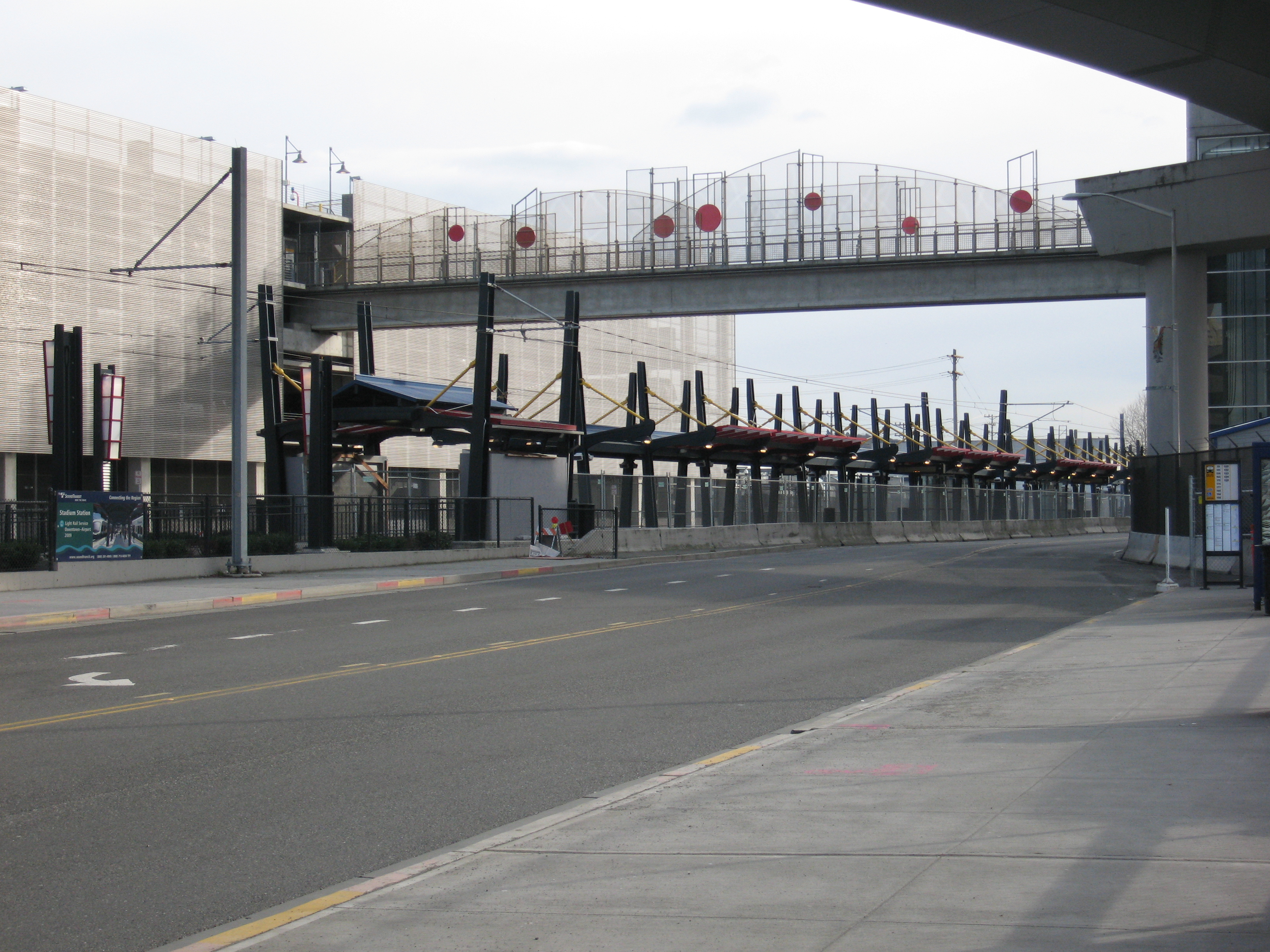
Stadium station, as viewed from its southbound SODO Busway stop served by ST Express and King County Metro buses.

Stadium station is part of Sound Transit's 1 Line, which runs from between Lynnwood, the University of Washington campus, Downtown Seattle, the Rainier Valley, Seattle–Tacoma International Airport, and Federal Way. It is the thirteenth southbound station from Lynnwood City Center and twelfth northbound station from Federal Way Downtown; Stadium is situated between SODO and International District/Chinatown stations. Trains serve the station twenty hours a day on weekdays and Saturdays, from 5:00 am to 1:00 am, and eighteen hours on Sundays, from 6:00 am to 12:00 am; during regular weekday service, trains operate roughly every eight to ten minutes during rush hour and midday operation, respectively, with longer headways of twelve to fifteen minutes in the early morning and at night. During weekends, Link trains arrive at Stadium station every ten minutes during midday hours and every twelve to fifteen minutes during mornings and evenings. The station is approximately 39 minutes from Lynnwood City Center station, 7 minutes from Westlake station in Downtown Seattle, and 29 minutes from SeaTac/Airport station. In 2025, an average of 2,003 passengers boarded Link trains at Stadium station on weekdays.

Stadium station is also served by several bus routes on the SODO Busway, which runs parallel to the 1 Line, at a pair of bus stops west of the station platform at Royal Brougham Way. Three Sound Transit Express routes stop at the station on their way to Tacoma, Lakewood, and Gig Harbor. King County Metro operates two all-day routes through the SODO Busway that serve Renton, Tukwila, and Kent. Metro also runs four peak-direction routes through the SODO Busway towards Renton, Fairwood, Federal Way, and Redondo Heights.

The station was the former terminus of the final northbound trips of the service day to allow for overnight maintenance in Downtown Seattle to begin sooner. Several "night owl" buses also stop the station and connect with the first southbound light rail departure of the service day. In addition to regular bus service, Metro also runs the Route 97 Link Shuttle, a shuttle service serving Link stations along surface streets during Link service disruptions.
