= Michael Davis (artist) =

American artist (born 1948)

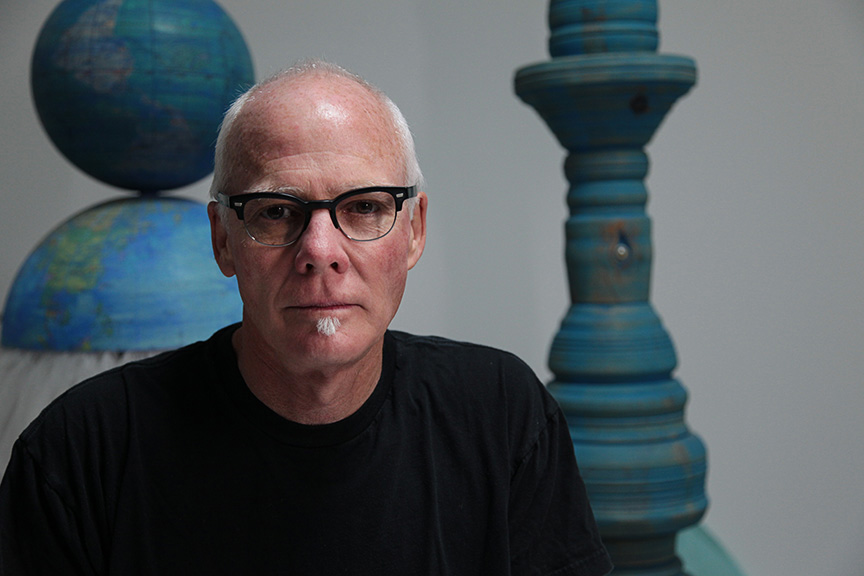
- Born: 1948 (age 77–78); Los Angeles, California
- Known for: Art
- Spouse: Susan Groetsch Davis
- Website: https://mad-art.com/

Michael Davis is a Los Angeles-based artist, working in drawing, sculpture, installation art, and public art. He maintains a studio in San Pedro, California. He received a master's degree in Fine Art from California State University, Fullerton, and has received grants including the National Endowment for the Arts. His work is in museums and galleries across the United States. His significant body of public art is in rail stations, public parks, and civic buildings across the United States and in Japan. He is the co-author and subject of Progress: In Search of the American Esthetic, an exhibition that featured photographs, video projections, audio, and ephemera documenting the cross-country round trip via car by artists Michael Davis and Stephen Moore from California to New York and back in 1970.

== Influences ==
Davis had early influence from Downey High School art teacher Ray White. He was a graduate of Chouinard Art Institute, the influential school and incubator for early Los Angeles contemporary artists. White introduced Davis to the work of Italian abstract expressionist Rico Lebrun, and to the German Bauhaus School of Art, that combined crafts and fine arts.

Davis grew up in Cold War America, and was highly influenced by the ever-present threat of communism and nuclear war.

American installation artist Robert Irwin influenced Davis in the relationship of separation of public and private space. Irwin's public art maintains a focus in creating subtle, at times vanishing environments with plain materials.

== Reception ==
Davis was included in a compilation of Los Angeles artists called L.A. Rising: SoCal Artists Before 1980. The compilation by Lynn Kienholz documented the work of 500 important artists working in Los Angeles during the growth of the seminal art scene. In that book, Walter Hopps wrote: "Davis's works have a strong iconographic content...not only is there an interest in architectural form, but also a kind of mythology...It's crafted and put together like something on the fringes of urban society."

Christopher Miles said of Davis: "Davis's practice is clearly informed by a long personal history on the part of the artist with direct engagement in the discourses of conceptual art practice, situational aesthetics, semiotics, deconstruction, and the critique of representation.... Though in ways elegiac, but not sentimental or nostalgic, Davis's work aspires to be art of his epoch, and perhaps even for his epoch–an art that engages with shared experience and endeavor, shared excitement and shared angst."

Art critic Howard N. Fox, in the catalogue essay "Road Trip/Road Show", described Progress, In Search of the American Esthetic by Michael Davis and Stephen Moore as a contemporary example of a cross-country artistic project, undertaken in 1970 and revisited in 2005. He noted that the work engages with themes of American culture, landscape, and artistic traditions, reflecting on the country's visual and cultural identity.

== Public Art ==
=== Partial List ===
- Design of Studio/Art Lab, Laguna Art Museum, Laguna Beach, California, 2020
- California Street Bridge Project, Ventura, California, 2019
- Hats, in collaboration with Eugene Daub, Lincoln Park Sculpture Garden, Burbank, California, 2018
- View Finders, San Francisco Exploratorium, Pier 15, San Francisco, California, 2015
- Travellers, Long Beach ARRA Transit Project, Long Beach, 2011
- SALUTE, Kansas City Police Station, Kansas City, 2010
- Re-Creation, Homage to the Urban Amateur, in collaboration with Susan Schwartzenberg, Harvey Milk Recreation Center, San Francisco, California, 2009
- Counter/Balance, Fire Station 36, San Pedro, California, 2006
- Made in the USA, Lander Station Rail Project, Seattle, Washington, 2006
- Equilibrium, Bronx Courthouse, New York, New York, 2006
- Grantville Station Art, Grantville Station, San Diego, California, 2005
- Rainbow Fountain, Long Beach, California, 2004
- Occurrence, Santa Monica Police, Fire, and Emergency Facility, Santa Monica, California, 2003
- WE THE PEOPLE, West San Fernando Valley Courthouse, Chatsworth, California, 2003
- The Water Screen, Main Street Square, Houston, Texas, 2003
- The Golden Section, Washington State University, Vancouver, Washington, 2003
- The Big Frame 2, Sarasota, Florida, 2002
- Chandelier Fall, Hollywood & Highland Project, Hollywood, California, 2001
- Ecliptic/Illume, Sunset/Vermont Metro Station, Los Angeles, California, 1999
- Heritage Park Sculpture Garden, sculpture garden design and five public art installations, Santa Fe Springs, California, 1999
  - Lanterns, Heritage Springs Sculpture Garden, Santa Fe Springs, California, 1999
  - Wicker Parlor, Heritage Springs Sculpture Garden, Santa Fe Springs, California, 1999
  - Derrick and Steel, Heritage Springs Sculpture Garden, Santa Fe Springs, California, 1999
  - Fossil Fountain, Heritage Springs Sculpture Garden, Santa Fe Springs, California, 1999
  - Snake Basket Fountain, Heritage Springs Sculpture Garden, Santa Fe Springs, California, 1999
