= SODO Busway =

Busway corridor in Seattle, Washington

- E-3 Busway
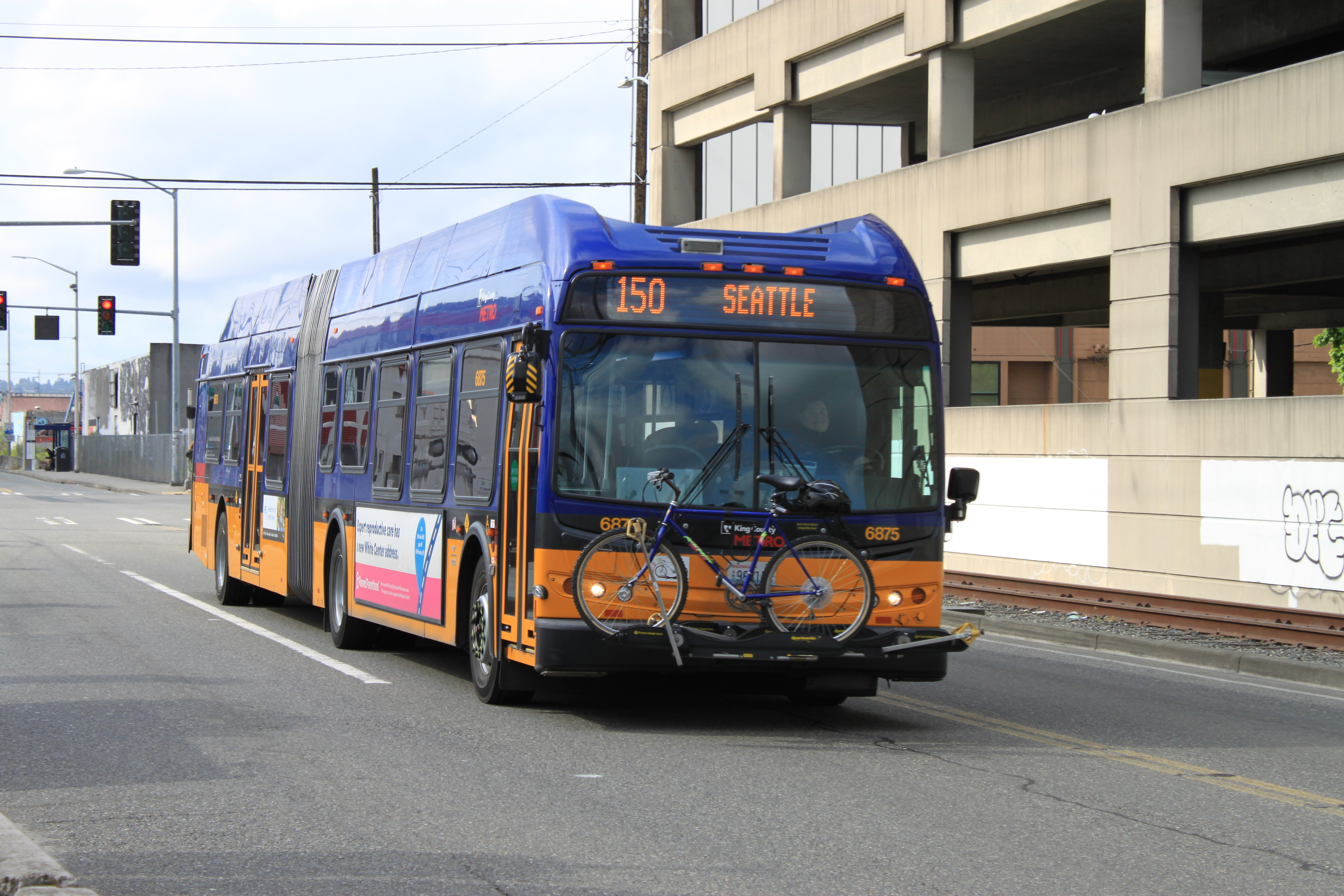
- King County Metro route 150 bus operating on the SODO Busway.
- Part of: 5th Avenue South
- Type: Busway
- Maintained by: Seattle Department of Transportation, King County Metro
- Length: 1.5 mi (2.4 km)
- Location: SoDo, Seattle
- South end: South Spokane Street
- North end: Royal Brougham Way

Construction
- Completed: December 8, 1991

The SODO Busway, also referred to as the E-3 Busway, is a 1.5-mile-long (2.4 km) busway in the SoDo neighborhood of Seattle, Washington. It has four stops, including two that connect to Link light rail stations, and functions as an extension of the Downtown Seattle Transit Tunnel, which was formerly used by buses. The busway is served by ten bus routes—seven King County Metro routes from southern King County and three Sound Transit Express routes from Pierce County.

== Route ==
The busway begins at an intersection with S Spokane Street, which is split into a couplet underneath the elevated Spokane Street Viaduct. The entrance is located about two blocks away from ramps to Interstate 5, which most routes utilize to travel between Downtown Seattle and their southern terminal.

The busway follows the 5th Avenue S corridor, which was a railroad right of way that once ran to Union Station. Buses share the corridor with freight trains (between S Spokane Street and S Forest Street), Central Link light rail trains (between S Forest Street and the Downtown Seattle Transit Tunnel portal), and the SODO Trail (between S Forest Street and S Royal Brougham Way). The busway ends at S Royal Brougham Way at the southern portal of the Downtown Seattle Transit Tunnel. Buses continue into downtown using 4th Avenue or other nearby streets.

=== Stops ===
Mile	km	Location	Routes	Notes
0.0	0	South Spokane Street	50, 101, 102, 150, 177, 590, 594, 595	
0.6	0.97	South Lander Street	50 (southbound only), 101, 102, 150, 177, 590, 594, 595	Adjacent to SODO light rail station. Northbound trips on route 50 serve a nearby stop on S Lander Street.
1.0	1.6	South Holgate Street	101, 102, 150, 177, 590, 594, 595	
1.4	2.3	South Royal Brougham Way	101, 102, 150, 177, 590, 594, 595	Adjacent to Stadium light rail station. Adjacent to Greyhound station. Also served by southbound night owl routes 5, 11, D Line, and E Line that connect with 4:42am light rail departure.

== Services ==
Approximately 43,000 passengers use services on the SODO Busway on an average weekday.

Operator	Route	Service type	Destinations served	Notes
King County Metro	50 (partial)	all-day	West Seattle (westbound); Othello Station (eastbound)	Only serves stops at S Spokane St & S Lander St (eastbound)
King County Metro	101	all-day	Renton	
King County Metro	102	peak-only	Fairwood via Renton	
King County Metro	150	frequent	Kent via Tukwila, Southcenter	
Sound Transit Express	590	peak-only	Tacoma	
Sound Transit Express	594	all-day	Lakewood via Tacoma	
Sound Transit Express	595	peak-only	Gig Harbor	
Sound Transit Express	597	night-only	Lakewood via Tacoma, Sea-Tac Airport	Only serves stops at S Royal Brougham Way & S Lander St

== History ==
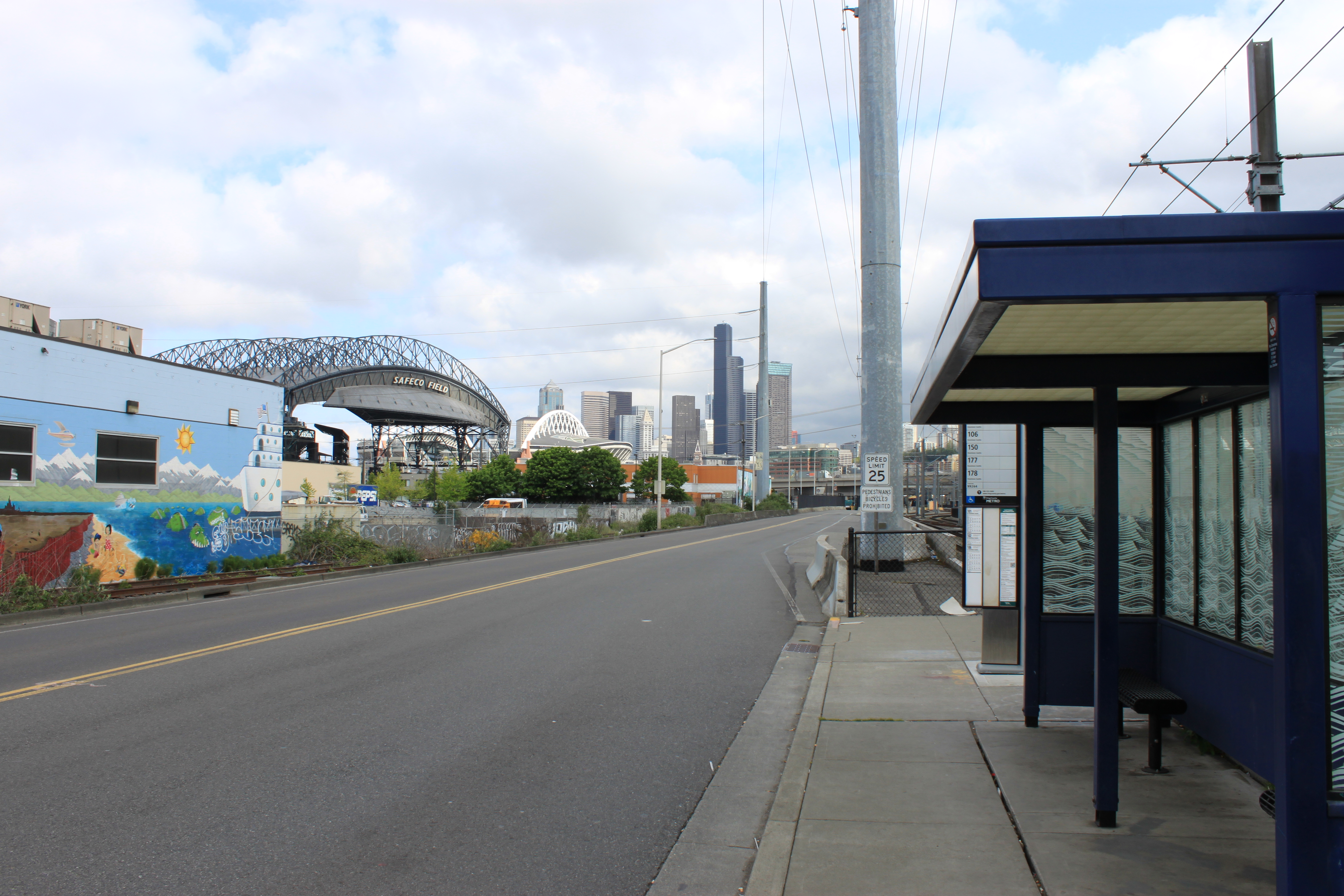
SODO Busway stop at South Holgate Street with Downtown Seattle in the background.

The SODO Busway runs through the SODO area of Seattle that has historically been used for industrial purposes, and today remains largely zoned for industry. The right-of-way was originally used by Milwaukee Road and Union Pacific trains to access Union Station. Milwaukee Road discontinued passenger service to the station in 1961, followed by Union Pacific in 1971. Freight railway spurs still serve industrial customers in the area.

The busway was built by the Washington State Department of Transportation in the late 1980s at total cost of $4.5 million, as part of a package of improvements to Interstate 90, that also included the addition of significant bus transit infrastructure on the freeway. During planning and construction the busway was named "E3 Busway" after the final selected option (Alternative E, Option 3).

The busway would have four stops, one at each street that intersected the busway: South Spokane Street, South Lander Street, South Holgate Street and South Royal Brougham Way. The busway also has electronic sensors buried in the roadway, triggering transit signal priority as buses approach intersections.

The SODO busway opened for bus traffic on December 8, 1991 and was initially used by 350 daily trips by King County Metro routes, serving 10,000 passengers and 43 daily trips by Pierce Transit express routes, serving 1,500 passengers. The busway shortened travel times by at least three minutes and even more during traffic on Interstate 5.

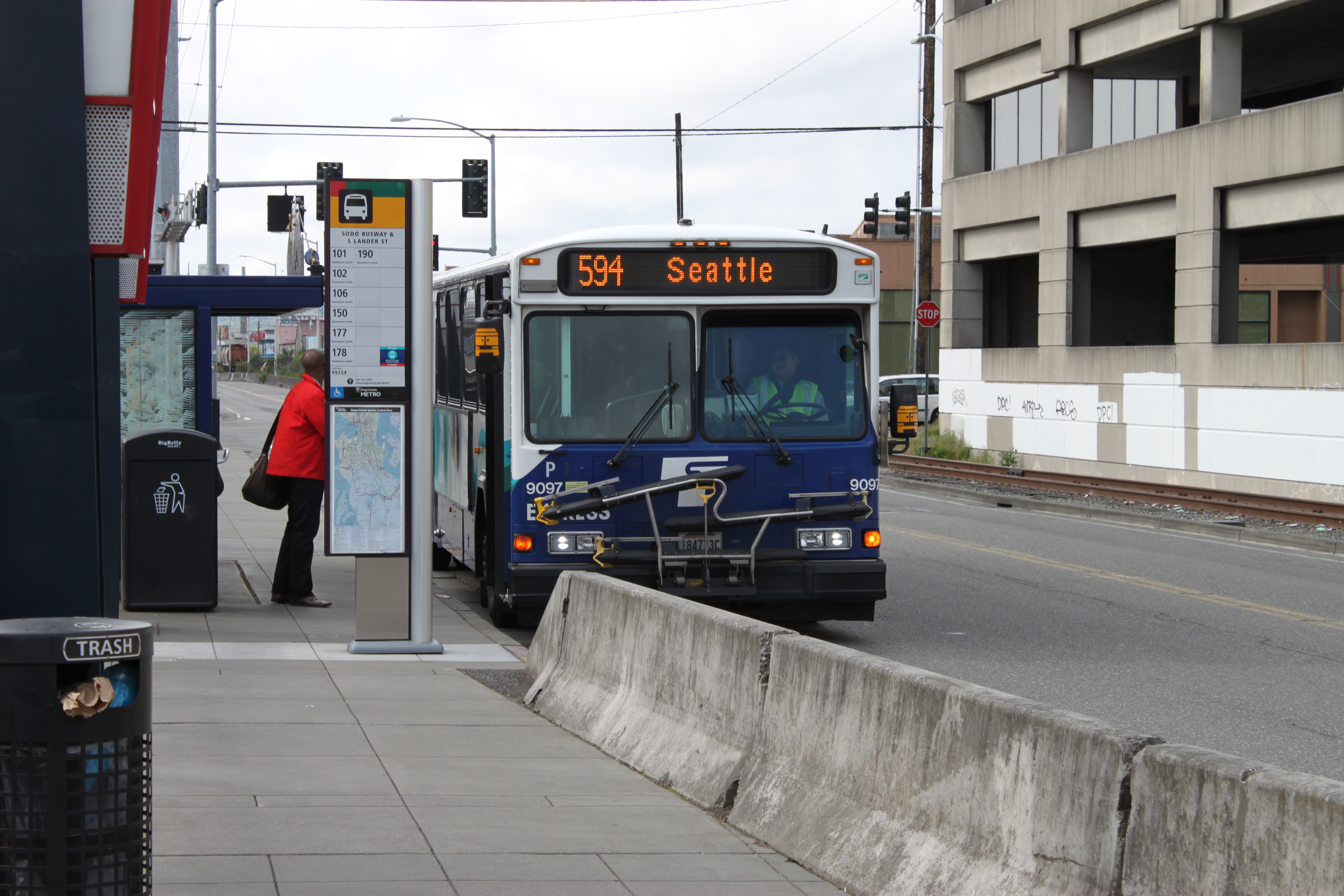
Sound Transit Express route 594 at SODO Busway stop at South Lander Street, next to the SODO light rail station.

In September 1999, the Pierce Transit express routes were replaced by Sound Transit Express routes, including on the busway.

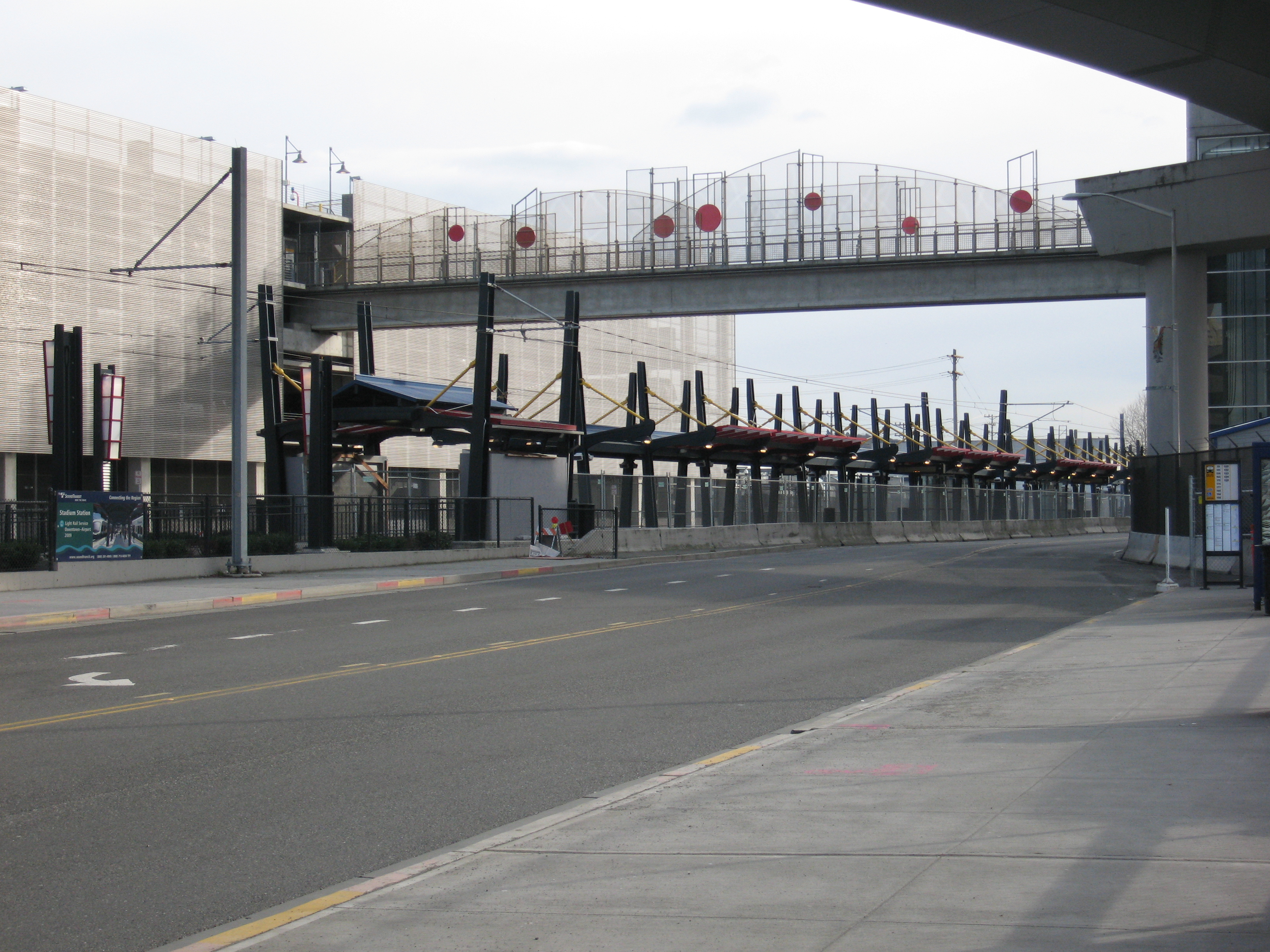
SODO Busway stop at South Royal Brougham Way with the Stadium light rail station in the background.

In November 2003, Sound Transit began construction of the Central Link light rail line, which included relocating utilities along the busway. In August 2005, the first rails were laid adjacent to busway from Holgate to Lander. Construction of SODO and Stadium stations was completed in May 2006, and opened along with the rest of the line on July 18, 2009.

== Future ==
Sound Transit plans to use some or all of the busway to build a light rail corridor between West Seattle and Downtown Seattle as part of the voter approved Sound Transit 3 package. It is scheduled to open in 2032.

One of the challenges faced by buses using the SODO Busway is that drivers are forced to exit the high-occupancy vehicle lanes of Interstate 5 miles before they reach Downtown Seattle, cross all lanes of traffic to reach the busway at the Spokane Street exit. In heavy traffic, this maneuver slows buses, often negating the time savings achieved by using the SODO Busway. As part of the 2007 Roads & Transit package, the Regional Transportation Investment District proposed building a direct connection from the Interstate 5 high-occupancy vehicle lanes to the SODO Busway at a cost of $83 million (2006 dollars). The plan was rejected by voters.

The SODO Busway was studied in 2012 as a possible route for buses to West Seattle after the demolition of the Alaskan Way Viaduct. Ramps would be built between the busway and 5th Avenue at the current site of the entrance to the Downtown Seattle Transit Tunnel and between the busway and the West Seattle Bridge. King County Metro instead chose to route buses to West Seattle via transit only lanes on Columbia Street and a new Alaskan Way surface street.

== Public art ==
Many of the buildings surrounding the busway are industrial in nature and have entrances facing towards other streets. The backsides, which faced the busway, became blighted with graffiti and inspired a campaign to cleanup the area. In fall 1995, the Sodo Business Association created the ArtWorks program to clean up the area. With a $15,000 grant from Seattle Public Utilities, a volunteer crew was able to cover over graffiti and hauled away some 300 tons of trash.

In an effort to keep the area clean in the long term, ArtWorks received an $80,000 matching grant from the city to help create the Sodo Urban Art Corridor project, a mural-painting and cleanup effort. The project also received contributions from SoDo businesses, including $5,000 from Starbucks, which has its corporate headquarters nearby, and in-kind donations of paint from Sears, Home Depot and the city of Seattle.

On July 25, 2016, work began on the SODO Track mural corridor which added to and replaced some of the volunteer murals with works commissioned from professional artists from around the world. The project was completed in July 2018, featuring 62 artists with 50 works on 32 walls.
