= Starbucks Center =

World headquarters of coffee chain Starbucks in Seattle, Washington

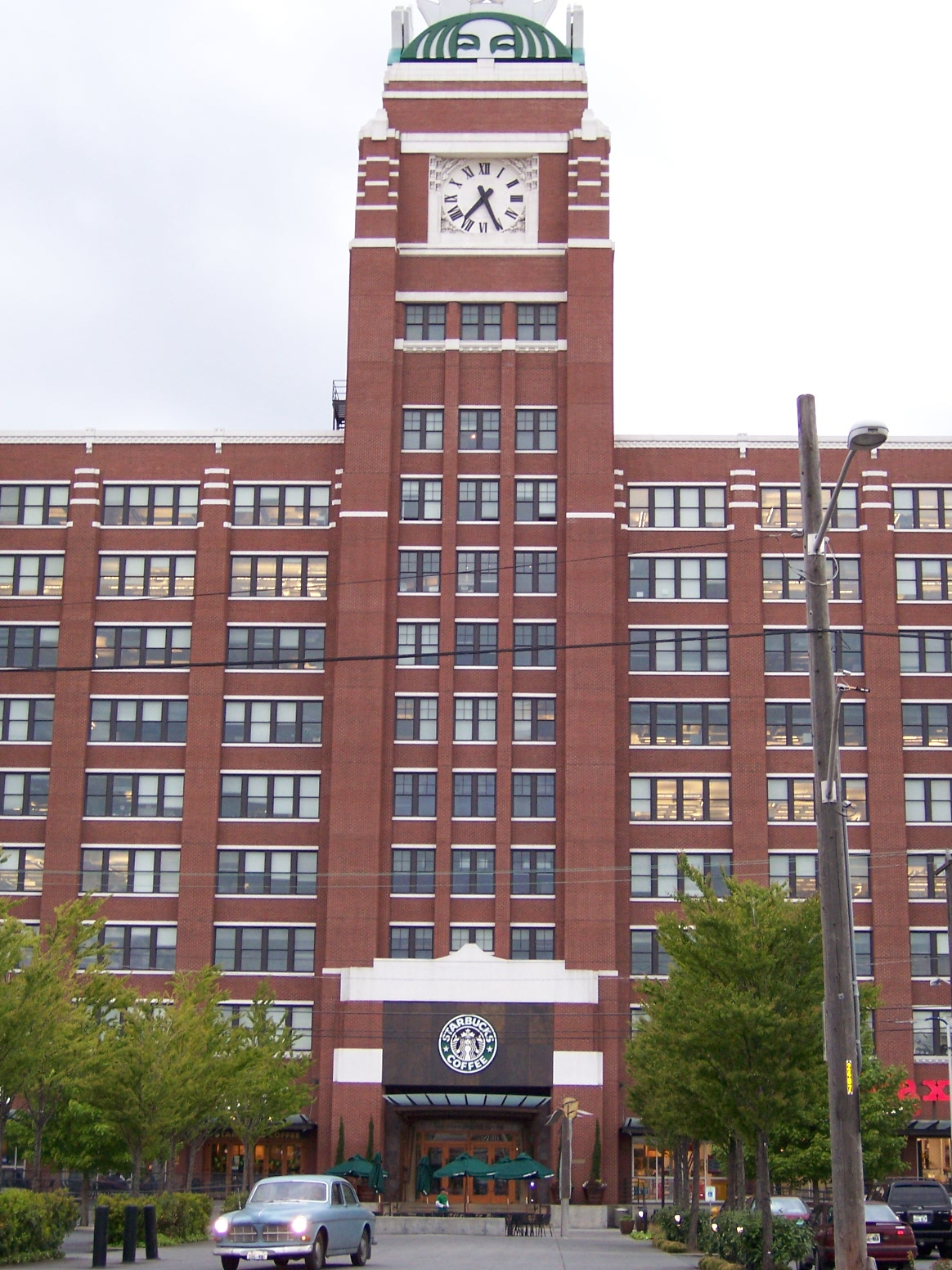
- Front of the building pictured in 2006
- Former names: Sears, Roebuck and Co. Building; SODO Center; SBC

General information
- Location: cor. 1st Avenue South & South Lander Street, 2401 Utah Avenue South; Seattle, Washington; 98134
- Coordinates: 47°34′51″N 122°20′8″W
- Current tenants: Starbucks; US Bank; SODO Kitchen; AmazonFresh Pickup
- Inaugurated: 1912
- Owner: Nitze-Stagen

Technical details
- Floor area: 1,800,000 sq ft (170,000 m^{2})

Design and construction
- Architect: George C. Nimmons

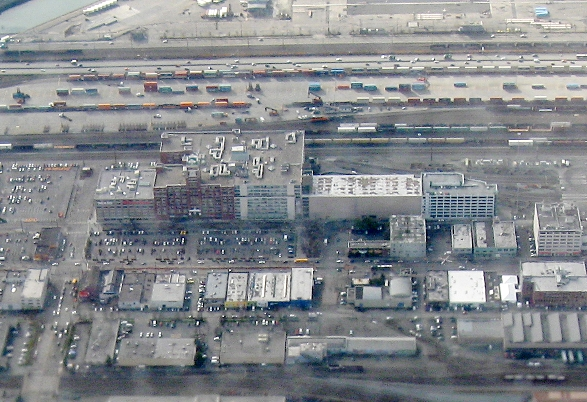
Aerial view of Starbucks Center

The Starbucks Center (formerly the SODO Center) is the world headquarters of the coffeehouse chain Starbucks. It is located in the SoDo neighborhood of Seattle, Washington; the area is part of the city's large industrial district. Starbucks Center is the largest multi-tenant building by floor space in Seattle, with over 1.8 million square feet (170,000 m^{2}). It is both the largest and oldest building in the country to earn a national green certification.

== History ==
In 1915, the building was constructed by Sears, Roebuck and Co. to fulfill the Sears Catalog in the Western United States. It was added on the north side of an original 1912 building. Sears opened their retail store at this location in 1925. According to the owner, this was the world's oldest continuously operated Sears store (though the Sears store on Lawrence Ave in Chicago opened in the same year and operated until 2016).

The building was repeatedly expanded during the 20th century. After the Sears catalog business was closed, the building was sold in 1990, and eventually redeveloped as the SoDo Center. Starbucks began moving its administrative offices to the old Sears building in 1993. On June 20, 1997, the coffeehouse chain moved its headquarters to the SoDo Center, became the building's primary tenant, and secured the naming rights. Accordingly, the building's name was duly changed from the SoDo Center to the Starbucks Center.

The building underwent significant renovation following severe damage caused by the 2001 Nisqually earthquake. The Sears department store closed in June 2014 along with its nearby Sears Auto Center. In the first quarter of 2017, Amazon Fresh's newest service, AmazonFresh Pickup, began operating out of the location.
