= SoDo, Seattle =

Neighborhood in Seattle, Washington, United States

- Seattle neighborhood
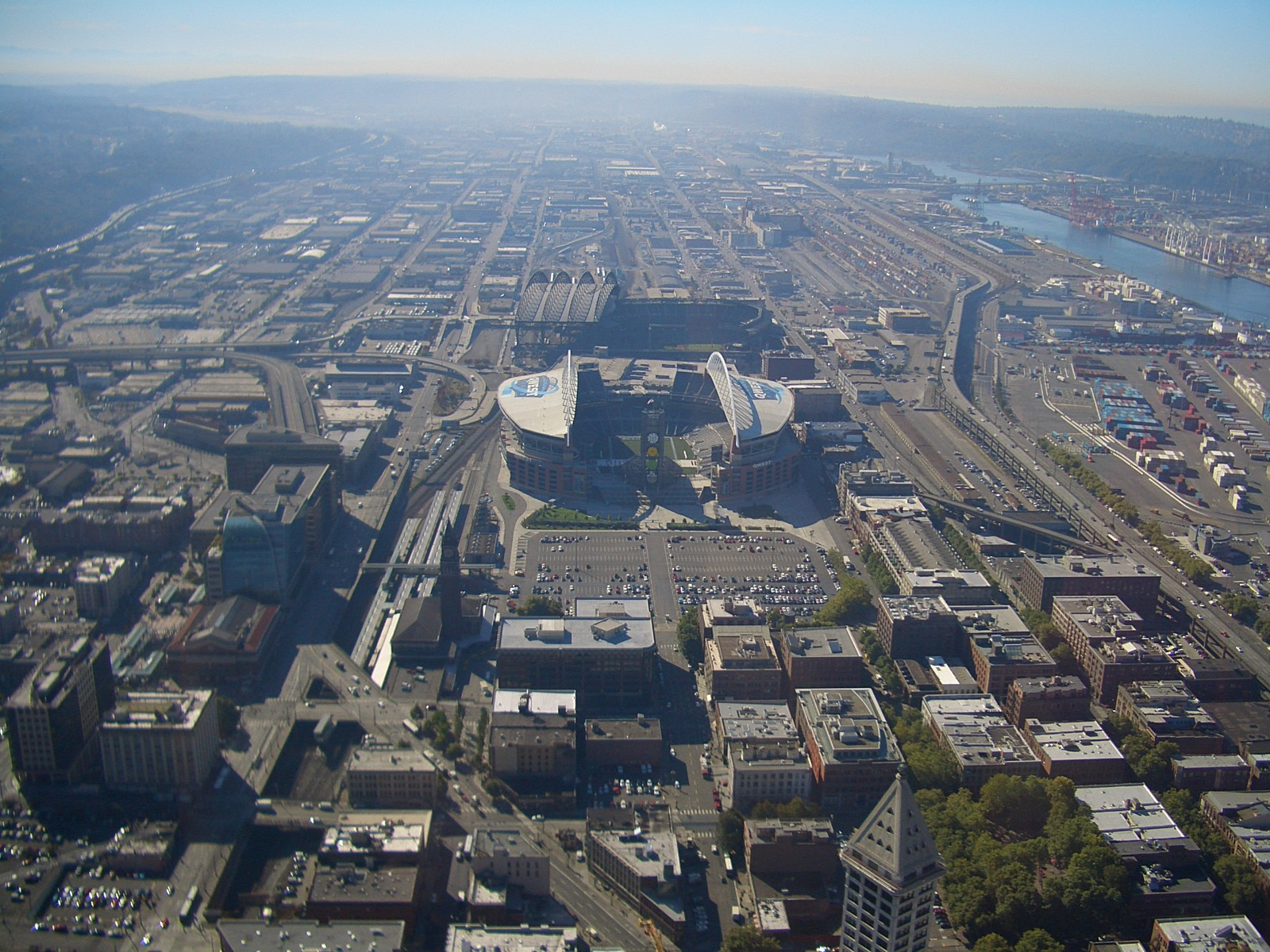
- View of SoDo from the Columbia Center

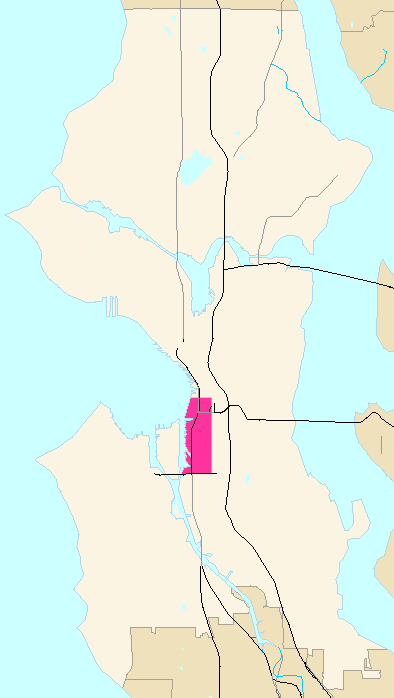
- SoDo highlighted in pink
- Coordinates: 47°35′20″N 122°19′57″W
- Country: United States
- State: Washington
- County: King
- City: Seattle
- Named for: South of the Dome; South of Downtown
- Time zone: UTC−8 (PST)
  - Summer (DST): UTC−7 (PDT)
- ZIP Code: 98154
- Area code: 206, 564

SoDo (alternatively SODO) is a neighborhood in Seattle, Washington, that makes up part of the city's Industrial District. It is bounded on the north by South King Street, beyond which is Pioneer Square; on the south by South Spokane Street, beyond which is more of the Industrial District; on the west by the Duwamish River, across which is West Seattle; and on the east by Metro Transit's Downtown Seattle Transit Tunnel and SoDo Busway, beyond which is the International District and the rest of the Industrial District.

SoDo was originally named for being located "South of the Dome", but since the Kingdome's demolition in 2000 the name has been taken to mean "South of Downtown". The moniker was adopted in the 1990s after the renaming of the Sears building to the SODO Center (now the Starbucks Center). It includes Seattle's downtown stadium district with two venues: T-Mobile Park, a baseball stadium and home to the Seattle Mariners of Major League Baseball; and Lumen Field, which was built on the site of the Kingdome and is home to the Seattle Seahawks of the National Football League, Seattle Sounders FC of Major League Soccer, and Seattle Reign FC of the National Women's Soccer League. The Mariners' popular marketing campaign in the early 2000s used the SoDo moniker in the catchphrase "SoDo Mojo". Per an agreement between the teams to avoid scheduling conflicts, the Mariners have priority for kickoff times.

SoDo deliberately echoes SoHo in New York City, where, during the 1970s, cheap spaces vacated by departing factories were converted by artists into lofts and studios.

SoDo has undergone a similar process but has not experienced much of the gentrification experienced by its putative model. Some of SoDo's warehouse buildings remain in their original use; others have been carved up for artists' lofts, art galleries, and an assortment of other businesses. As one travels farther south along First Avenue S., these conversions peter out, and light manufacturing, warehouses, and warehouse-style retail stores predominate.

== Demographics ==
As of the 2000 United States census, SoDo had a population of 2,602, with a median age of 41.2, in 458 owner-occupied residences and 536 rentals. The average annual household income was $42,208. The racial breakdown was 41% White, 28% Asian, 14% Black, 9% Hispanic/Latino, 3% American Indian/Alaska Native, and 5% other.

== Transportation ==
SoDo main thoroughfares are First and Fourth Avenues S. and Alaskan Way S. (north- and south-bound) and S. Lander and Holgate Streets, Edgar Martínez Drive S., and S. Royal Brougham Way (east- and west-bound). The western terminus of Interstate 90, which travels 3,020 miles (4,860 km) east towards Boston, Massachusetts, is in SoDo.

The neighborhood is also served by public transit service. Sound Transit operates the 1 Line light rail service through the neighborhood, stopping at two stations: SODO at Lander Street, and Stadium at Royal Brougham Way. The SODO Busway runs along 5th Avenue South and carries bus routes from King County Metro and Sound Transit Express.
