= Washington State Fair =

Annual state fair in Puyallup, Washington, U.S.

Coordinates: 47.182°N 122.297°W

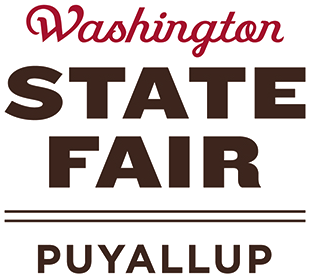

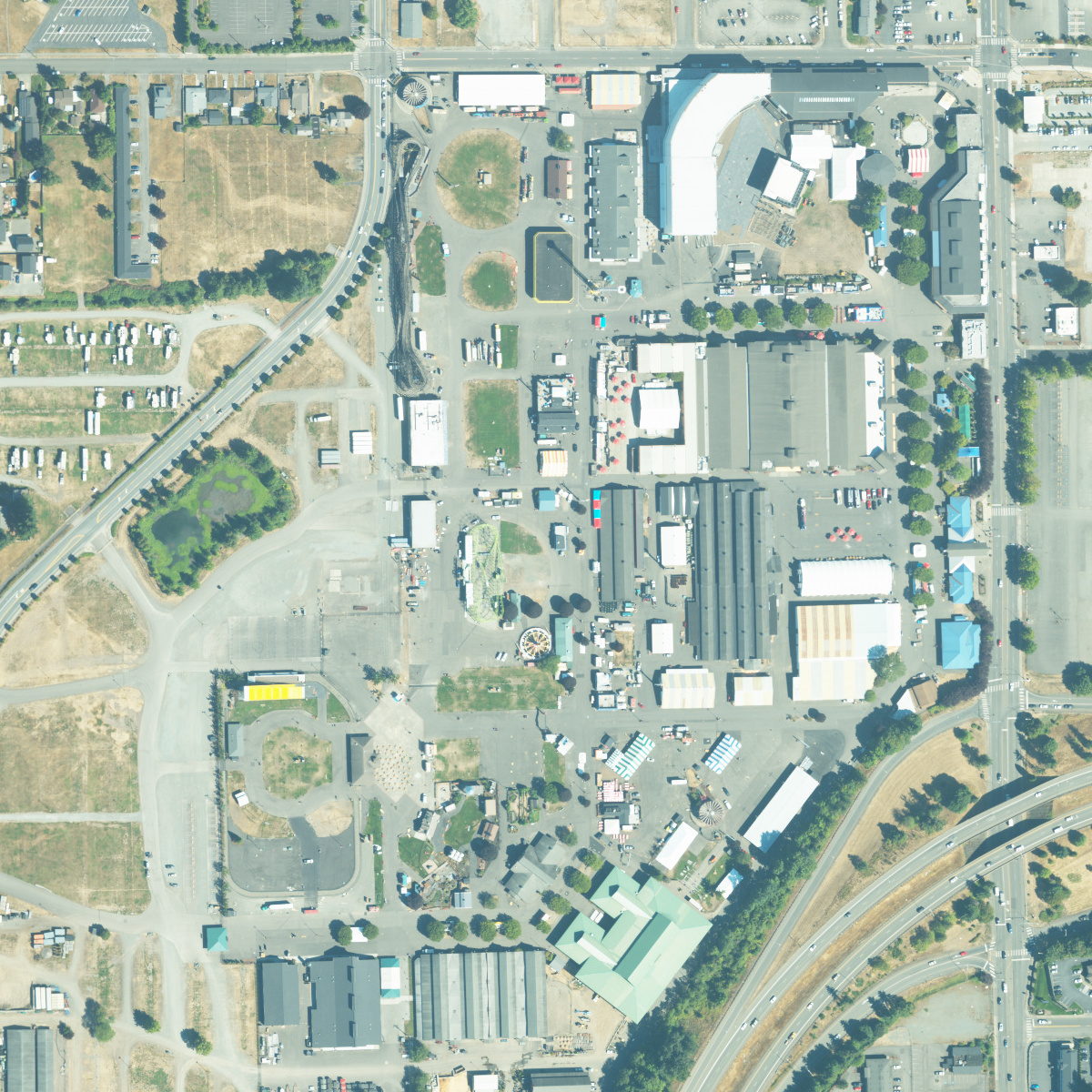
- Aerial view of the fairgrounds in August 2023
- Genre: State fair
- Dates: Main fair: August – September; Spring fair: April
- Locations: 110 9th Ave Southwest; Puyallup, Washington, U.S.
- Next event: August 28 through September 20, 2026 (closed on Tuesdays and September 2)
- Attendance: 912,000 (2024)
- Budget: $50 million (2024)
- People: Renee McClain (CEO)
- Website: www.thefair.com

The Washington State Fair, formerly the Puyallup Fair, is the largest single attraction held annually in the U.S. state of Washington. It continually ranks in the top ten largest fairs in the United States and includes agricultural and pastoral displays and shows, amusement rides, and concert series. The Washington State Fair hosts two annual events: the 21-day Washington State Fair in September, and the four-day two weekend Washington State Spring Fair in April. The land and facilities are also leased to independent events and conventions throughout the year.

Situated in the city of Puyallup, 35 miles (56 km) south of Seattle and 10 miles (16 km) east of Tacoma, the fairgrounds cover an area of 176 acres (0.71 km^{2}). It comprises venue buildings, an amusement park, parking lots, and other uses. The facilities are available for rent throughout the year, making the grounds a valuable community resource. The fairgrounds also hosts various seasonal festivals such as the Victorian Country Christmas, as well as races, concerts, car shows, and sporting expositions, including the International Sportsman's Exposition. The site employs 55 year-round staff members. Over 7,500 employees are hired each September during the Fair.

According to event organizers, 912,000 visitors attended the fair in 2024.

== History ==
The fair started out under the name "Puyallup Valley Fair", with the first event taking place October 4–6, 1900. In 1913, it was renamed "The Western Washington Fair", but remained primarily known as the "Puyallup Fair" until the early 1980s. In 2006, the name was changed again to "The Puyallup Fair", and the venue became known as "The Puyallup Fair and Events Center." In 2013 the fair received its current name, the "Washington State Fair"; however, the marketing tagline "Do the Puyallup" was retained and many local people continue to refer to the fair by its previous name.

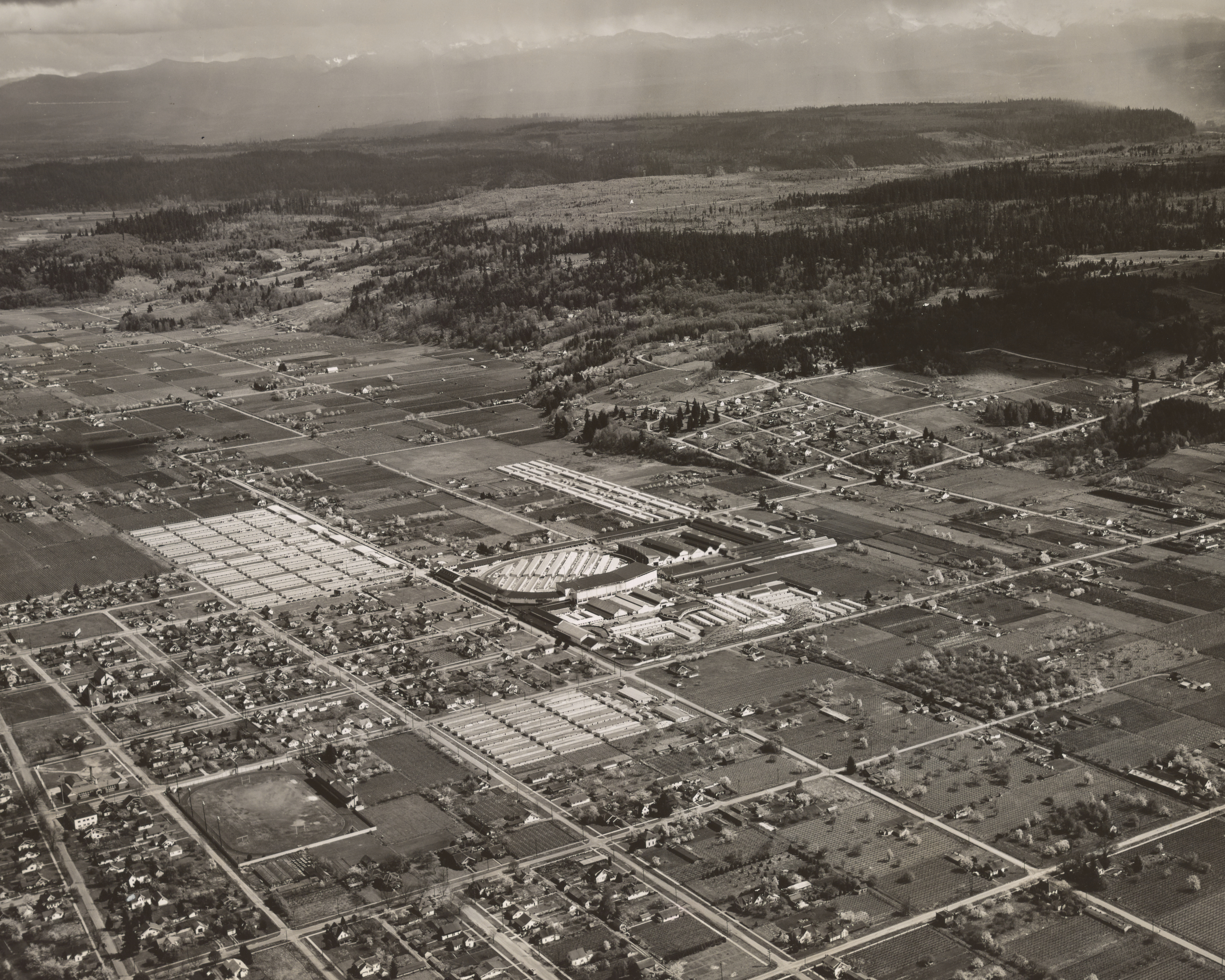
Fair Grounds in April 1942

During World War II, the fair did not take place. The fairgrounds closed after the 1941 fair and were occupied by the army, which set up Camp Harmony, a temporary assembly center within the system of concentration camps for Japanese Americans. A total of 7,390 Japanese Americans from the Seattle-Tacoma area and Alaska were confined in converted horse stables and barracks constructed on adjacent parking lots, the racing track and under the grandstand. In September 1942, the Japanese Americans were sent to other locations and the camp was torn down. The fairgrounds were briefly occupied by the U.S. Army 943rd Signal Service Battalion until they were transferred to Fort Lewis, then closed until 1946, when the fair set an attendance record of 100,000 people on opening day.

The cancellation of the Fair's 2020 season was announced on July 8, 2020, due to the COVID-19 pandemic. It was the first edition of the Fair to be cancelled since World War II. The fair returned in 2021 with masking requirements and limited capacity, drawing 816,000 total attendees—a 20 percent decrease.

== Transportation ==
The fair is served by special Sounder commuter trains from Seattle and Everett that are operated on select weekends by Sound Transit. Pierce Transit operates fare-free express buses from Lakewood station to the Blue Gate during the duration of the fair.

== See also ==
- Pacific National Exhibition in Vancouver, B.C., whose grounds were also a Japanese Internment Center during World War II
- Central Washington State Fair in Yakima, designated as the original location of the Washington State Fair
- Evergreen State Fair in Snohomish County, an annual summer county fair
- Lakefair in Olympia, an annual summer festival
