= Mukilteo station =

Commuter train station in Mukilteo, Washington

Mukilteo
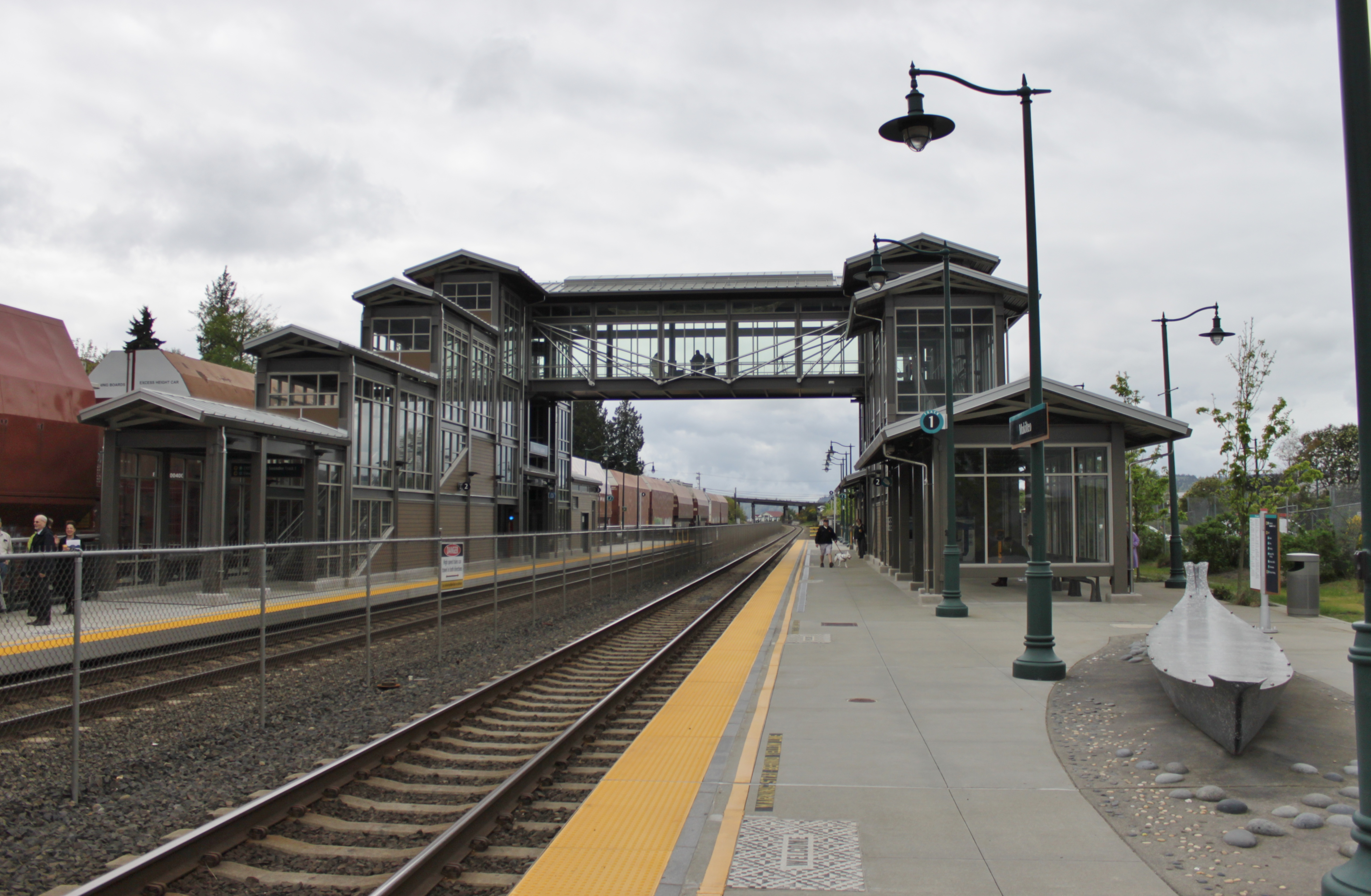

General information
- Location: 920 First Street; Mukilteo, Washington; United States
- Coordinates: 47°56′57″N 122°17′55″W
- Owner: Sound Transit
- Line: BNSF Railway Scenic Subdivision
- Platforms: 2 side platforms
- Tracks: 2
- Connections: Washington State Ferries, Community Transit, Everett Transit

Construction
- Parking: 63 spaces
- Cycle facilities: Racks; Lockers (annual fee)
- Accessible: Yes

History
- Opened: May 31, 2008

Passengers
- 47 daily weekday boardings (2025); 11,999 total boardings (2025)

Services
Preceding station	Sound Transit	Following station
Sounder
Edmonds toward Seattle	N Line	Everett Terminus
Location

Mukilteo station is a train station serving the city of Mukilteo, Washington. It is owned by Sound Transit, who runs the N Line of the Sounder commuter rail service through the station from Everett to King Street Station in Seattle. The station includes a parking lot with 63 spaces, as well as connections to nearby Washington State Ferries, Community Transit, and Everett Transit service on State Route 525. Mukilteo station opened in 2008 with a single side platform, later supplemented with a second platform and pedestrian overpass in 2016.

== Description ==
Mukilteo station consists of a two side platforms, connected by a covered pedestrian overpass, sited along the BNSF Railway's Scenic Subdivision between Seattle and Everett. The station, located one block east of the Mukilteo ferry terminal on State Route 525, contains a 63-space park and ride lot with a drop-off area that is accessible through an entrance/exit from Front Street; the platform also houses a ticket vending machine and ORCA card readers.

Mukilteo is served by the eight daily Sounder trains on weekdays, running on the N Line along the Puget Sound between Everett Station and King Street Station in Seattle. The runs are split between four morning and four afternoon runs, with a single round-trip gameday service provided for weekend events at Lumen Field and T-Mobile Park. Train service on the corridor, which includes BNSF freight traffic and Amtrak passenger service, is frequently disrupted and canceled during the autumn and winter seasons because of landslides from unstable slopes above the tracks. During the 2012–2013 winter season, a record-high of 206 passenger trains between Everett and Seattle were canceled, prompting the Washington State Department of Transportation to begin a three-year landslide mitigation project in 2013 that will stabilize slopes above the railroad between Seattle and Everett.

The station is located near Mukilteo's Washington State Ferries terminal, serving the Whidbey Island Ferry, which also functions as a transfer point for buses operated by Community Transit and Everett Transit. All-day local buses connect the station to Everett Station and the terminus of the 1 Line at Lynnwood City Center station. Mukilteo station was formerly the terminus of express buses serving the Boeing Everett Factory, Downtown Seattle, and the University of Washington that were eliminated in service restructures in the 2020s. Mukilteo station has three pieces of artwork, collectively named "As Above So Below", from sculptor Linda Beaumont and commissioned by Sound Transit. The sculptures depict canoes—two on the platform encased in concrete and terrazzo; and a fiberglass canoe hanging from the pedestrian bridge.

== History ==
The Great Northern Railway had served Mukilteo between 1891 and 1970, including a major depot opened on November 1, 1903.

A commuter rail station in Mukilteo had been part of the original Sound Transit proposal rejected in 1995 and adopted the following year, as part of a Seattle–Everett line on the existing BNSF corridor. The agency selected the station site in 1999, choosing a platform east of State Route 525 and the Washington State Ferries terminal over one at Mukilteo Lighthouse Park because of concerns arising from existing parking and traffic issues in the area. Work on the station was put on hold until the completion of a second track through the area, though Sound Transit did consider building a temporary platform to boost ridership on the North Line. A groundbreaking ceremony was held in August 2007 for the initial phase of the project, the northern side platform, as part of a multimodal transit hub built in conjunction with a new Mukilteo ferry terminal. The $19.2 million project, including preparations for a second phase to open in 2009, was funded by Sound Transit with a grant from the Federal Transit Administration. Sounder service from Mukilteo Station began on May 31, 2008, with a special weekend round-trip run to a Seattle Mariners game. The project was praised by local politicians for its multi-agency cooperation, especially between Sound Transit and Washington State Ferries.

Construction on the second platform, an island platform connected via a pedestrian overpass, began in January 2014 with the closure of Mukilteo Lane near the station. Part of the existing North Platform was closed for use as a staging area in March 2014, expanding and contracting before and after rush hour, respectively. The $11 million project, designed by AECOM and HNTB in 2012, was originally scheduled to be completed in 2015. Delays in construction, including state approval of the new elevators, pushed back the completion date to April 2016. As part of the STart program, a percentage of construction funds went towards installing art made by Whidbey Island resident Linda Beaumont at the station.

As part of the Mukilteo Multimodal Project, Sound Transit and the Washington State Department of Transportation planned to build a new ferry terminal in Mukilteo with upgraded transit connections. The new terminal opened in December 2020 and is located closer to the Sounder platforms and includes a new bus station.
