= South Tacoma station =

Commuter train station in Tacoma, Washington

South Tacoma
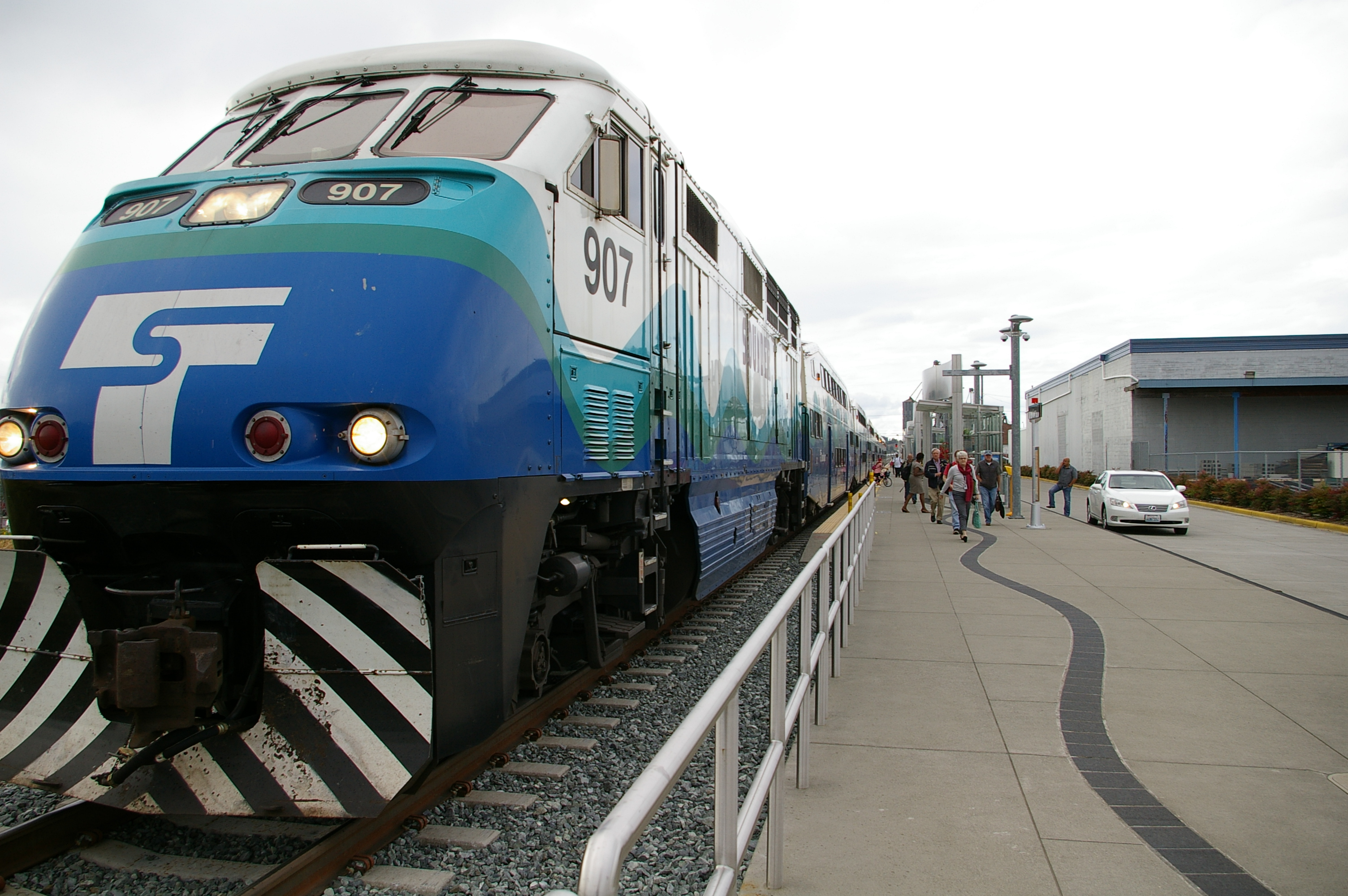
- A southbound Sounder train at the station

General information
- Location: 5650 South Washington Street; Tacoma, Washington; United States
- Coordinates: 47°12′13″N 122°29′08″W
- Owner: Sound Transit
- Line: Sound Transit Lakeview Subdivision
- Platforms: 1 side platform
- Tracks: 1
- Connections: Pierce Transit

Construction
- Structure type: At-grade
- Parking: 220 parking spaces
- Cycle facilities: Bicycle lockers and racks
- Accessible: yes

History
- Opened: February 9, 2009

Passengers
- 101 daily weekday boardings (2025); 25,793 total boardings (2025)

Services
Preceding station	Sound Transit	Following station
Sounder
Lakewood Terminus	S Line	Tacoma Dome toward Seattle
Location

South Tacoma station is a commuter rail station in Tacoma, Washington, United States, served by the S Line of the Sounder commuter rail network. It is located near the Tacoma Mall along South Tacoma Way at South 56th Street and consists of a single platform and a 220-stall park-and-ride lot. Construction on the station began in early 2008 and the park-and-ride lot opened in February 2009, with service from a temporary express bus that operated until Sounder service began in October 2012.

== Description ==
South Tacoma station is located southwest of South Tacoma Way at its intersection with South 56th Street in southern Tacoma. The station's platform runs along a 1,200-foot-long (370 m) section of Washington Street between 56th and 60th streets and includes five passenger shelters, bicycle racks, and four bicycle lockers. The southern portion of the platform is also a one-way drop-off zone for vehicles and buses and is adjacent to a 220-stall parking lot for commuters on the west side of the track, at South 60th Street and South Adams Street. South Tacoma station is located southwest of the Tacoma Mall and is in a major heavy industrial area, with some mixed commercial and residential land uses.

The station has two sculptures by New York artist Ilan Averbuch, who was commissioned by Sound Transit through their public art program. At the north end of the platform is Landmark, a pair of upturned, 18-foot-tall (5.5 m) cor-ten steel and granite arches that were inspired by the shape of train wheels and the dome of Union Station in downtown Tacoma. The End of the Line runs along most of the platform as a granite ribbon that emerges from the pavement in the shape of a railroad spike near the south end.

== History ==
A commuter rail station in southern Tacoma was proposed in 1994 by the regional transit authority (later Sound Transit) as part of a line between Lakewood and Seattle. It was included in the unsuccessful 1995 ballot measure to fund regional transit and returned in the Sound Move referendum that was passed by voters in November 1996. Sound Move allocated $7 million in funding for the South Tacoma station, tentatively located at South 56th Street.

The scheduled opening of the Lakewood extension, including South Tacoma's station, was originally set for 2001, but was delayed eleven years due to planning and funding issues in the early 2000s. Sound Transit named three potential sites for South Tacoma's commuter rail station and parking lot in 2000: South 58th and Adams street, South 50th Street and Burlington Way at the site of an old Northern Pacific depot, and the intersection of South 56th and Adams streets, preferred by Sound Transit and attendees of public hearings for its proximity to the street. The South 56th and Adam site, which extended south towards 60th Street, remained the agency's preferred location and was adopted by the transit board in December 2002.

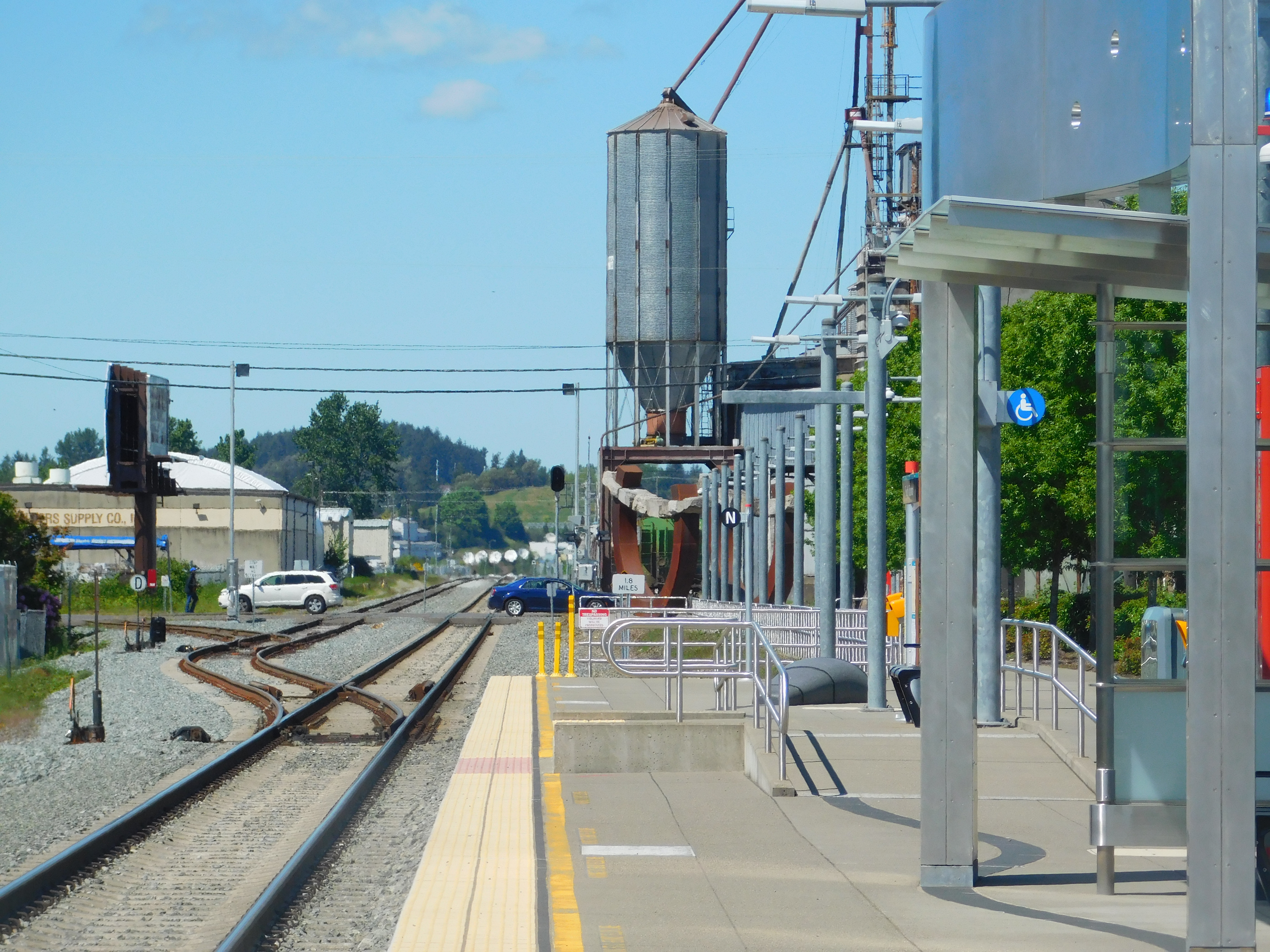
Looking north towards South 56th Street from the platform

The site of the station was shifted to the southern alternative at South 58th Street to avoid longer delays for vehicles traveling across 56th Street. Sound Transit began acquiring properties at the station in late 2003, but ran into resistance from the owners of a century-old home at the proposed site for the park-and-ride lot. After an initial offer from the transit agency was rejected, the eminent domain case was heard by the Pierce County Superior Court and state Supreme Court, who both ruled in Sound Transit's favor by early 2006. The ruling sparked public outcry over the use of online-only meeting notices and inspired the state legislature to pass a bill requiring a certified letter to affected property owners and a newspaper notice. The landowners were eventually paid $500,000 for the property after a separate court case settled by a county jury.

Construction of the $16.5 million South Tacoma station began in January 2008, with plans to prepare for commuter rail service in 2012. A temporary express bus from the station to Tacoma Dome Station and Downtown Seattle began on February 9, 2009, after the completion of station's park-and-ride lot. Sounder service to Lakewood and South Tacoma began on October 8, 2012, following a weekend celebration that drew hundreds of people to the new South Tacoma station for free rides and festivities. By 2030, Sound Transit plans to construct new bicycle lanes to South Tacoma station and improve sidewalks in the area as part of a $56 million project. It was funded by allocations in the Sound Transit 2 program that were originally meant for expanding parking at the station.

== Services ==
South Tacoma station is served by eight daily round-trips on the Sounder S Line, which travel north to King Street Station in Downtown Seattle and south to Lakewood station on weekdays. Sounder trains travel from South Tacoma to Seattle in approximately 71 minutes. The station is indirectly served by Pierce Transit route 3, which travels primarily on South Tacoma Way between Lakewood Towne Center, Tacoma Mall, and Downtown Tacoma. Pierce Transit formerly served South Tacoma station with several routes, including a local bus on South 56th Street that was removed in a 2017 restructure. The agency also experimented with a custom express bus from the station to University Place and Olympia that debuted in late 2013, but the program was eliminated in 2014 after a spell of low ridership.
