= Sounder commuter rail =

Commuter train system in the Seattle area

Sounder

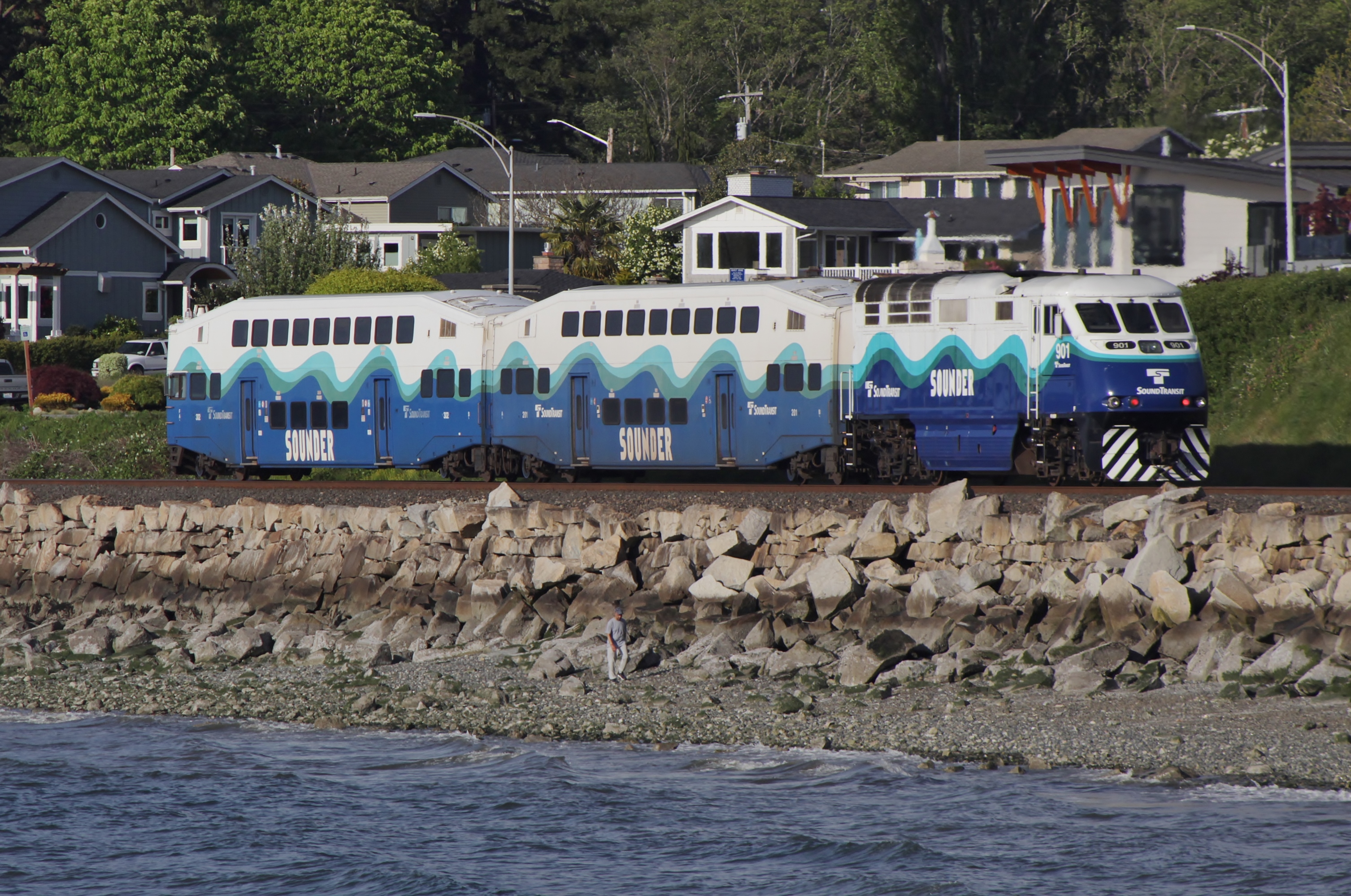
- A Sounder trainset on the N Line in Edmonds

Overview
- Owner: Sound Transit
- Locale: Seattle metropolitan area
- Transit type: Commuter rail
- Number of lines: 2
- Number of stations: 12
- Daily ridership: 7,827 (2025)
- Annual ridership: 2,090,709 (2025)
- Website: soundtransit.org

Operation
- Began operation: September 18, 2000; 26 years ago
- Operator: BNSF Railway
- Reporting marks: SDRX
- Number of vehicles: 14 locomotives, 78 cars
- Train length: 2–7 passenger cars

Technical
- System length: 81.8 miles (131.6 km)
- Track gauge: 4 ft 8 1/2 in (1,435 mm) (standard gauge)
- Top speed: 79 mph (127 km/h)
System map
Map of the central Seattle metropolitan area with Sounder highlighted in black

Sounder (reporting mark SDRX) is a commuter rail system that serves the Seattle metropolitan area in the U.S. state of Washington. Managed by Sound Transit, it uses 82 miles (132 km) of tracks, primarily owned by operator BNSF Railway, and runs with equipment maintained by Amtrak. Sounder is split into two lines that intersect at King Street Station in Seattle: the N Line to Everett and the S Line to Tacoma and Lakewood.

Trains typically operate during peak periods, with morning trips to Seattle and afternoon trips to outlying suburbs. Limited mid-day service is offered on the S Line, and both lines offer special weekend trips for sporting events and other major events. Sounder has 12 stations that connect with Link light rail as well as local and regional bus systems. Most also provide park-and-ride facilities, bicycle lockers, and other amenities. Fares are paid using ORCA cards, paper tickets, and mobile ticketing apps, and validated through proof-of-payment checks. In 2025, the system carried more than 2 million total passengers, or an average of 7,827 on weekdays.

The commuter rail system was preceded by mainline passenger railroad services that began in the late 19th century and two interurban railways that connected Seattle to Everett and Tacoma in the early 20th century. The Municipality of Metropolitan Seattle (now King County Metro) led studies into a modern commuter rail system in the 1980s that were later transferred to the Regional Transit Authority (now Sound Transit), created in 1993. A demonstration service from Everett to Tacoma ran in early 1995, ahead of an unsuccessful ballot measure to fund a regional transit system. A second ballot measure, Sound Move, was passed by voters in November 1996.

Sounder was among the first Sound Transit projects to be launched and construction on its stations began in 1998. The South Line (now the S Line) entered service on September 18, 2000, and was followed by the North Line (now the N Line) on December 26, 2003. Additional trips on both lines were launched in the 2000s after a series of signal and track improvements were completed by Sound Transit and BNSF. The South Line was extended from Tacoma to Lakewood in October 2012 and debuted the first mid-day Sounder trips in 2016. Both lines were rebranded in 2021. An extension of the S Line to DuPont was funded by the Sound Transit 3 package in 2016 and is expected to open in 2045.

== Lines ==
The Sounder commuter rail system comprises two lines that total 81.8 miles (131.6 km) in length and serve twelve stations. King Street Station in Downtown Seattle is the system's central hub and the terminus of both lines. The N Line (formerly the North Line) serves three stations and terminates in Everett; the S Line (formerly the South Line) serves eight stations and terminates in Lakewood, with some trips ending in Tacoma. The two lines carried a total of 2 million passengers in 2025, of which nearly 94 percent were on the S Line; Sounder was the 13th-busiest commuter rail system in the United States by ridership that year.

Train service is primarily operated during weekday rush hours, with trips inbound to Seattle during the morning and outbound to the suburbs in the afternoon. Other services, including reverse commute and mid-day trips, are offered on the S Line while both lines have occasional weekend service for special events. Most of the Sounder system uses tracks owned by BNSF Railway, which is also contracted to operate the trains. Amtrak provides fleet maintenance and storage of trains at their Seattle facility. The Lakewood–Tacoma segment of the S Line, part of the Point Defiance Bypass, uses tracks that are owned by Sound Transit.

=== N Line ===
The icon for the N Line

The N Line begins in Seattle and travels north for 34.2 miles (55.0 km) on the BNSF Scenic Subdivision towards Snohomish County, where it serves three stations and terminates in Everett. It typically uses short trainsets with two or three passenger cars during its normal four round-trips on weekdays; for special event services, the N Line has five-car trainsets. Trains leave King Street Station and cross beneath Downtown Seattle in the Great Northern Tunnel. The tracks emerge under Pike Place Market and travel through four at-grade crossings along Alaskan Way on the city's waterfront. The N Line continues northwest past Myrtle Edwards Park and under the Magnolia Bridge to traverse the Balmer Yard, a major BNSF railyard in the Interbay neighborhood.

The tracks cross over the Lake Washington Ship Canal on the Salmon Bay Bridge, a movable bascule bridge near the Ballard Locks, and pass through Golden Gardens Park. The N Line continues north along the shore of Puget Sound and passes under overpasses at Carkeek Park in Seattle and Richmond Beach in Shoreline. The coastline tracks run under steep bluffs to the east that range from 80 to 100 feet (24 to 30 m) in height and are prone to landslides during the winter season. The line enters Snohomish County at Woodway and turns northeast at Edwards Point to reach the Edmonds waterfront. Its first outbound station is Edmonds station, located adjacent to the city's ferry terminal and downtown.

The N Line continues north along Puget Sound until it reaches Mukilteo Lighthouse Park, where the tracks turn east and cross under State Route 525. Trains then stop at Mukilteo station, a two-platform station near a ferry terminal that serves the Whidbey Island ferry. The tracks continue northeast along Possession Sound and pass several public beaches before they reach Everett. The N Line travels east under Downtown Everett in a short tunnel and turns south to reach its terminus at Everett Station, a multimodal hub with bus and Amtrak connections. Trains take approximately 53 minutes to travel from Seattle to Everett and have views of Puget Sound, the Olympic Mountains, and Mount Baker.

=== S Line ===
The icon for the S Line

The S Line is 47.6 miles (76.6 km) long and travels south along the State Route 167 corridor from Seattle to Pierce County, where trips terminate in either Tacoma or Lakewood. It follows portions of the BNSF Seattle Subdivision from Seattle to Tacoma, a Tacoma Rail spur, and Sound Transit's Lakewood Subdivision from Tacoma to Lakewood. The S Line uses longer trainsets in five-car and seven-car configurations and has 13 round trips on weekdays—including reverse direction trips and limited mid-day service. Trains begin at King Street Station and travel south along the east side of Lumen Field and T-Mobile Park, passing under the retractable roof of the latter, in the industrial SoDo neighborhood. The tracks pass the Sounder and Amtrak maintenance facility near South Holgate Street and continue under the Spokane Street Viaduct; they then turn southeast at Union Pacific's Argo Yard.

The line travels southeast through Georgetown and runs between Boeing Field to the west and Interstate 5 to the east. The S Line crosses under the tracks for the 1 Line of the Link light rail system near South Boeing Access Road and continues into Tukwila. The tracks cross under Interstate 5 and begin to follow the Duwamish River and later the Green River near Fort Dent Park and the Starfire Sports complex. Trains then pass under Interstate 405 near the former Longacres horse racing track and arrive at the first outbound station, Tukwila, which is shared with Amtrak Cascades. The S Line continues south through the industrial Green River Valley into Kent, where it crosses under State Route 167 and stops at Kent station. The tracks traverse eight at-grade crossings in Kent before crossing the Green River at the city's southern boundary.

The S Line passes Auburn Municipal Airport and the Emerald Downs horse racing track in northern Auburn. It then stops to serve Auburn station in the city's downtown near an interchange with State Route 18. Trains pass through a large railyard and cross over the White River before leaving King County to enter Pierce County near Pacific. The tracks turn southwest in Sumner and serve the city's train station near its downtown. The S Line then crosses over State Route 410 and the Puyallup River before it turns northwest to enter Puyallup. The line crosses under State Route 512 and stops at Puyallup station near the Washington State Fairgrounds; it also traverses a series of at-grade crossings in the city.

The tracks continue northwest to follow the Puyallup River and make a series of turns along the western edge of the rural valley as it approaches Tacoma. The S Line crosses under State Route 167 and Interstate 5 and leaves the BNSF Seattle Subdivision and onto a section of track owned by Tacoma Rail that includes a 1,600-foot (490 m) trestle. The S Line reaches Tacoma Dome Station, a major intermodal hub near the Tacoma Dome with connections to the T Line streetcar, buses, and Amtrak trains. The line moves to the Sound Transit-owned Lakewood Subdivision on a single track that crosses west under Interstate 705 and State Route 16 as it traverses a grade of 2.85 percent—among the steepest of any passenger railway in the United States. The S Line curves south and passes through South Tacoma station before it enters the city of Lakewood. The tracks pass an auxiliary railyard for Sounder trains and turn southwest near McChord Field to reach the southern terminus of the S Line at Lakewood station. S Line trains from Seattle to Tacoma Dome Station take a scheduled 62 minutes, while Seattle to Lakewood is approximately 76 minutes.

== Stations ==
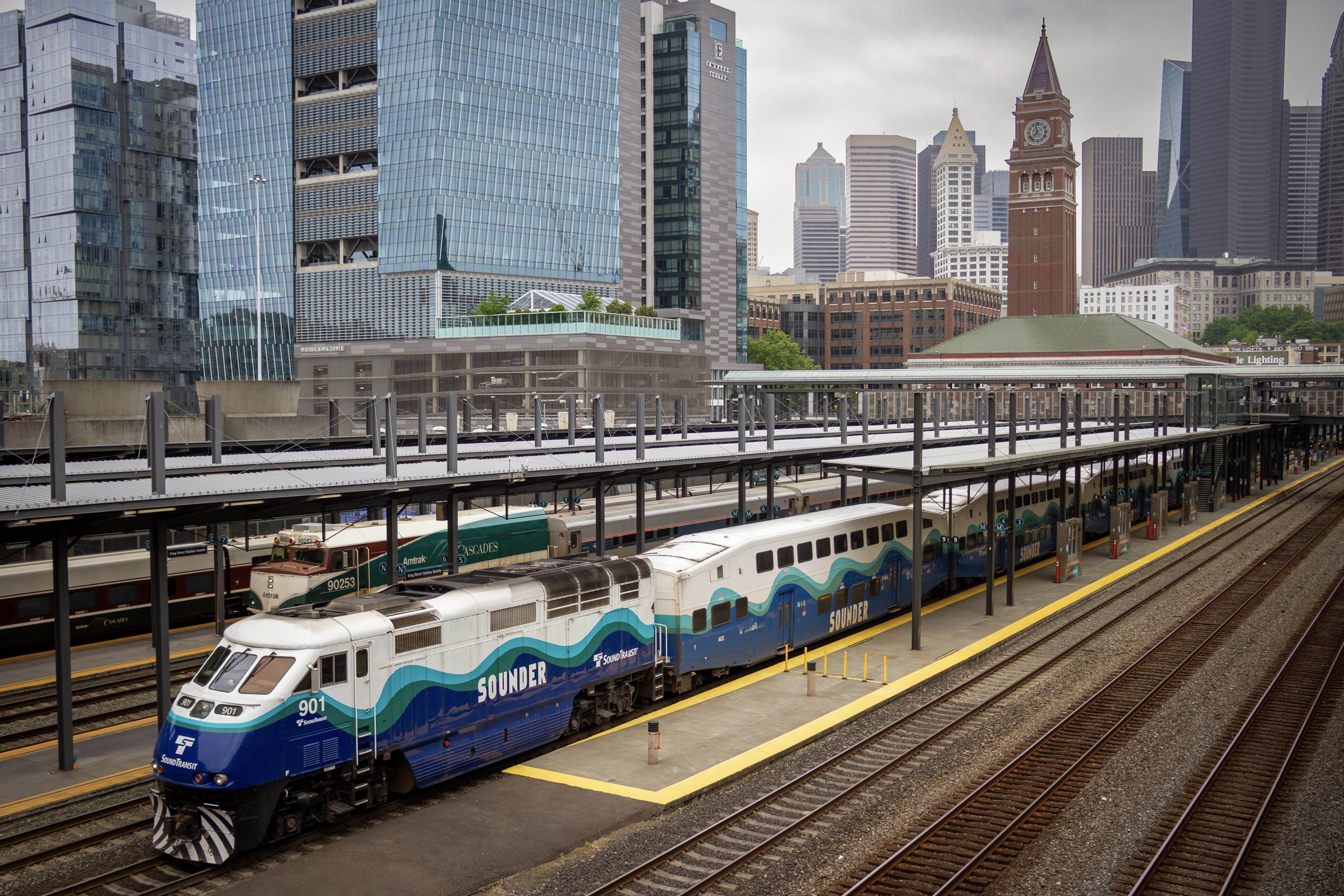
King Street Station in Seattle is the hub of the Sounder system

The Sounder commuter rail system has 12 stations that are spaced several miles apart to allow for faster average speeds than local systems such as Link light rail. Each station has at least one platform that is 500 to 600 feet (150 to 180 m) long and can accommodate a seven-car trainset. The platforms include shelters, ticket vending machines, ORCA card readers, and a raised "mini-high" platform for level boarding onto trains; the raised portion is setback from the tracks to accommodate wider freight train clearances. The edge of the platform is marked with tactile paving and patterned tiles named "welcome mats" that mark where train doors are expected to open. The latter is part of Sound Transit's public art program, which also encompasses sculptures and design elements at stations.

All 12 stations have facilities that connect with other modes of transportation that provide local and regional service, including intercity Amtrak trains and the Washington State Ferries system. Local and express buses, including Sound Transit Express routes, also connect with Sounder trains. Most stations also have park-and-ride lots, with over 1,200 stalls on the N Line and 6,200 stalls on the S Line, and bicycle lockers. Most Sounder stations are at street level with direct access to adjacent streets, with the exception of King Street Station and Tukwila station; several have bridges for pedestrian crossings that separate them from train traffic.

Sounder stations
Station	County	Began service	Annual ridership (2025)	Transfers and connections
Lakewood	Pierce	October 8, 2012	53,139	
South Tacoma	Pierce	October 8, 2012	25,793	
Tacoma Dome	Pierce	September 18, 2000	171,123	Link light rail: T Line; Amtrak: Cascades, Coast Starlight
Puyallup	Pierce	February 5, 2001	131,673	
Sumner	Pierce	September 18, 2000	78,754	
Auburn	King	September 18, 2000	96,995	
Kent	King	February 5, 2001	100,817	
Tukwila	King	March 12, 2001	20,904	Amtrak: Cascades
King Street–Seattle	King	September 18, 2000	824,565	Link light rail: 1 Line, 2 Line; Amtrak: Cascades, Coast Starlight, Empire Builder
Edmonds	Snohomish	December 23, 2003	21,108	Amtrak: Cascades, Empire Builder; Washington State Ferries
Mukilteo	Snohomish	May 31, 2008	11,999	Washington State Ferries
Everett	Snohomish	December 23, 2003	23,782	Amtrak: Cascades, Empire Builder

== History ==
=== Predecessors ===
The first railroad to reach the Puget Sound region was the Northern Pacific Railway, a transcontinental route that began construction with a section from the Columbia River at Kalama in May 1871. Several communities on Puget Sound competed to become the terminus of the Northern Pacific and offered land and other incentives; Tacoma on Commencement Bay was chosen in July 1873 ahead of Seattle and Olympia. The railroad to Tacoma was completed in December to meet a deadline imposed by the United States Congress and scheduled passenger and freight service began on January 5, 1874. Prominent Seattle residents and businessmen organized the Seattle and Walla Walla Railroad to begin construction in May 1874 with the goal of connecting to the Northern Pacific, which would later construct a line across Stampede Pass. It began passenger service from Seattle to Renton in 1877 and was reorganized as the Puget Sound Shore Railroad as it was extended south to Stuck Junction near modern-day Auburn in 1883.

Northern Pacific briefly ran passenger trains between Tacoma and Seattle from July to August 1884 on the Puget Sound Shore Railroad, which had been upgraded to standard gauge but lacked track ballast. Trips took 3 hours and 25 minutes on the mainline railroad between the two cities, which primarily traversed the Duwamish Valley (now the Green River Valley). The line was nicknamed the "Orphan Road" after it had been abandoned by Northern Pacific; service resumed on October 26, 1885, with two daily trains. Northern Pacific acquired the line and gradually improved access to Seattle by building new tracks and running more frequent service on the line. The Great Northern Railway built its own transcontinental route to Seattle that included a waterfront route along Puget Sound from Everett that opened for passenger service in June 1893. The two railroads agreed to build a union station, which opened on May 10, 1906, and was later named King Street Station. Great Northern had moved their services to a new tunnel under Downtown Seattle that was the tallest and widest tunnel in the United States at the time of completion.

Both railroads operated daily local passenger trains in the Puget Sound region, including a dozen trips to Tacoma and eight to Everett by 1911; most had onward intercity service to Portland, Oregon, and Vancouver, British Columbia. A set of electric interurban railways were operated by private utility Stone & Webster in the early 20th century to provide more frequent passenger service from Everett and Tacoma to Seattle. The Puget Sound Electric Railway from Seattle to Tacoma began service on September 25, 1902, with 22 stops on local trains and express runs that reached 60 miles per hour (97 km/h); it had a peak ridership of 3 million in 1919. The Seattle–Everett Interurban Railway opened on April 30, 1910, and took 70 minutes to serve 30 stations on its 29-mile (47 km) inland route. Both services were faster than other trains and the "mosquito fleet" of steamships on Puget Sound, but were not profitable and faced increasing competition from automobiles and buses on the expanding highway system. The Tacoma line ceased operations in December 1928 and was followed by the Everett line in February 1939; their rights-of-way were later converted to other uses, including multi-use trails.

=== Proposals and studies ===
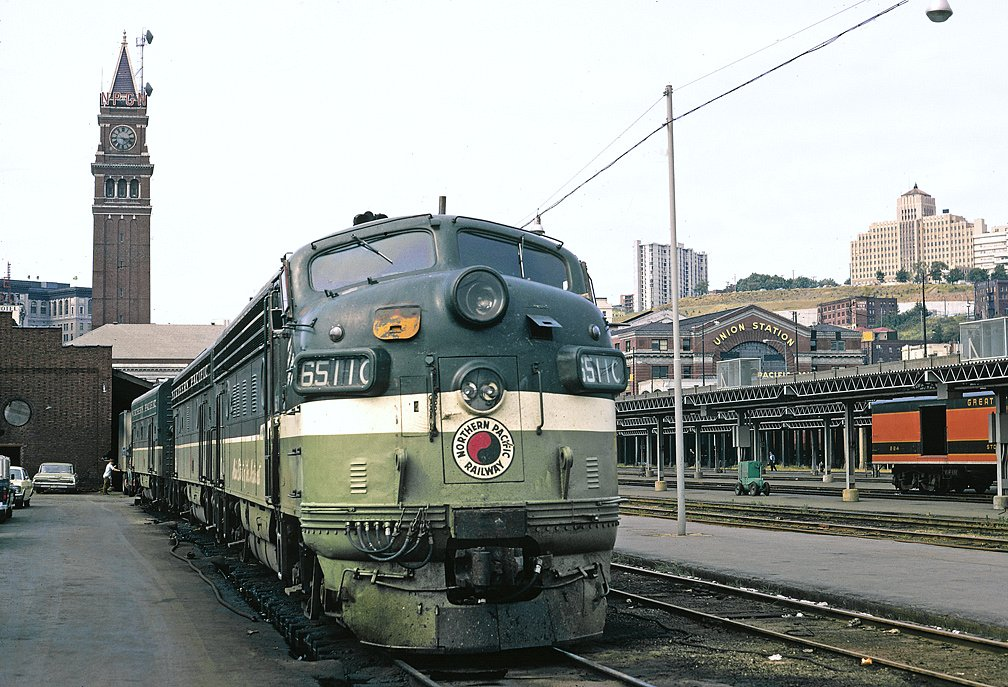
A Northern Pacific passenger train at King Street Station, 1970

Proposals to develop a commuter rail system on the existing Great Northern and Northern Pacific tracks in the Seattle area date back to the 1960s, when highway congestion had also spurred plans for a separate rapid transit system. The two railroads had discontinued most of their passenger trains; by 1966, Great Northern operated four daily Seattle–Everett trips and Northern Pacific had three Seattle–Tacoma trains. The companies, which merged into the Burlington Northern Railroad in 1970, had seen financial losses in operating passenger service and requested federal subsidies to continue them. Amtrak took over the passenger trains on May 1, 1971, and retained the Seattle–Tacoma schedule of up to three daily round trips. The Seattle–Everett corridor was initially excluded from the Amtrak network until intercity service to Vancouver was restored in 1972. The 1976 opening of the Kingdome in Seattle brought new interest to local trains in the region, as the stadium was built next to King Street Station and had limited parking. Amtrak adjusted its southbound schedule to account for stadium events and suggested that they would be able to add passenger cars for future football, baseball, and soccer games. An independent entrepreneur also proposed $3 million in financing (equivalent to $13.2 million in 2025 dollars) to run leased double-decker trains from eight park-and-ride stations to the stadium and envisioned further expansion to the Eastside.

In 1986, the Municipality of Metropolitan Seattle (Metro Transit; now King County Metro), the operator of King County's bus system, began a feasibility study for a five-year commuter rail demonstration project that would connect Seattle to the Green River Valley. It would use existing Burlington Northern tracks and be operated by Amtrak with six stations in Auburn, Kent, and Tukwila. A permanent commuter rail system would complement a regional light rail system studied by Metro Transit and the Puget Sound Council of Governments that would use different corridors. A request for funds to continue the commuter rail study was denied by the Washington State Rail Development Commission, which had been created in 1987 by the state legislature and sought to expand its scope to also include Pierce and Snohomish counties. An extension to Tacoma was dropped from the scope of the study, but would be considered for a future expansion that could reach as far south as Olympia. Metro Transit's study determined that the demonstration project would cost $117 million to launch with service as early as 1992 and would attract an estimated 7,600 daily passengers.

Burlington Northern agreed to share technical information with Metro Transit for their studies and stated that they were interested in operating the trains, which they could accommodate with the construction of a parallel track should demand warrant it. The company rejected a proposal from U.S. Senator Brock Adams to run temporary commuter trains during the 1990 Goodwill Games, a sports event hosted in the Seattle area. The revised plan for the commuter rail project included six daily round trips, including reverse commute runs, from King Street Station in Seattle to Union Station in Tacoma with five intermediate stops. It would cost $99.8 million (equivalent to $210 million in 2025 dollars) with one-fourth of its financing provided by a federal grant and the rest from a sales tax increase that would require voter approval. Metro Transit received $25 million (equivalent to $52.6 million in 2025 dollars) in federal appropriations in 1991 for the demonstration project, which would take three years to develop and launch, and additional funds to plan a permanent system with Pierce and Snohomish counties. The Union Pacific Railroad, which also operates a Seattle–Tacoma freight mainline, expressed interest in hosting the commuter rail system. Burlington Northern commissioned a study for a Seattle–Everett commuter rail line in late 1992 after discussions with local governments and Community Transit, the bus operator in Snohomish County.

The state legislature authorized the creation of a regional transit authority to plan several projects, including the permanent commuter rail system. The Central Puget Sound Regional Transit Authority (RTA) was approved by the King, Pierce, and Snohomish county councils and was formally created in September 1993. Earlier that year, Burlington Northern had operated a demonstration ride from Seattle for local elected officials and employees and submitted a simulated schedule that would allow 32 daily passenger trains to run without disrupting existing freight traffic to the Port of Seattle. The RTA inherited an earlier regional transit plan that included 76 miles (122 km) of commuter rail on two lines from Everett and Tacoma to Seattle, estimated to cost up to $460 million (equivalent to $905 million in 2025 dollars). A spur line to serve Renton and Bellevue was also studied, but rejected due to its low projected ridership and high costs. In October 1994, the RTA adopted its master plan for regional transit that would be submitted as a ballot measure in March 1995. The plan included commuter rail from Seattle to Everett in the north and Tacoma and Lakewood to the south, which would take three years to launch upon approval.

=== Demonstration project and votes ===
In early 1995, the RTA and Burlington Northern operated "Try Rail", a two-month fare-free demonstration of commuter rail service to Seattle from Everett and Tacoma, to promote the ballot measure. The $2.5 million project (equivalent to $4.82 million in 2025 dollars) was funded by a federal grant and the state's settlement in an antitrust lawsuit against several oil companies. It used a set of 14 bilevel cars, each able to carry 150 passengers, from GO Transit in Toronto that had previously been leased to Metrolink in Southern California to provide additional service after the 1994 Northridge earthquake. The program was originally scheduled to launch as the "Sonics Express" at the beginning of the 1994–95 basketball season for the Seattle SuperSonics, who had been temporarily relocated to the Tacoma Dome.

The demonstration was delayed due to issues securing financing and was renamed to reflect its expanded scope, which included rush hour service to Seattle that began from Everett on January 28. Two daily round trips ran on weekdays on the Seattle–Everett corridor, serving the existing Edmonds station and a temporary stop in Everett; select days had runs that began in Everett and continued beyond Seattle to Tacoma for Seattle SuperSonics games, which charged $10 for a round-trip ticket. The demonstration moved to the Seattle–Tacoma corridor on February 20 with two weekday round trips that stopped at the Tacoma Amtrak station and a temporary platform in Kent. Try Rail was originally scheduled to end on March 3, but was extended to March 11—three days before the special election on the RTA plan. It operated a total of 122 trips and drew 69,200 boardings, including 47,900 on its 32 mid-day and weekend excursions; the Sonics service did not perform as well as expected due to limited marketing and the delay in starting the service until the middle of the season.

The 1995 RTA plan was estimated to cost $6.7 billion (equivalent to $12.9 billion in 2025 dollars) and included 81 miles (130 km) of commuter rail that served 17 stations from Lakewood and Tacoma in the south to Everett in the north. The system would initially have 30 daily trips and eventually grow to 55 trips, with limited mid-day and weekend service; trains would depart every 30 minutes during peak hours and would take an hour to reach Everett and Tacoma from Seattle with a maximum speed of 79 miles per hour (127 km/h). The plan and its local sales tax to finance the projects were rejected by 53.5 percent of voters in the RTA's district during the special election on March 14, 1995. Amid discussions of a second RTA ballot measure, King County Executive Gary Locke proposed a smaller package that excluded the commuter rail system in favor of funding highway improvements. The state government was also proposed as the temporary operator of a commuter rail system using $9 million in federal funding that had already been appropriated for the system.

A smaller and less expensive plan from the RTA, which would be used in a second ballot measure, was announced in January 1996. The commuter rail system's extension to Lakewood was initially removed, along with service outside of peak hours. The RTA restored service to Lakewood in the final plan adopted in May, which allocated $669 million to the commuter rail system with fifteen daily trains during peak hours. The system would have two lines that used existing Burlington Northern tracks and served 14 stations with three provisional stations that could be constructed with additional funding. The modified plan, named Sound Move, was approved by 56.5 percent of voters on the November 5, 1996, with a majority in all three counties. The RTA's preliminary schedule for the projects in Sound Move was adopted early the following year with plans to begin construction on commuter rail stations in 1998. The Seattle–Tacoma commuter rail line would be operational by 2000 and followed by the Seattle–Everett line in early 2001 and an extension to Lakewood at a later date.

=== Planning and South Line launch ===
"Sounder" was adopted as the name for the commuter rail system on August 15, 1997, by the RTA, which renamed itself to Sound Transit. Another finalist was "Commuter Link", which would have been paired with "Rail Link" for the light rail system (instead named Link light rail) and "Bus Link" for the regional bus network. Earlier in the year, former North County Transit District acting director Paul Price, who had overseen the launch of the Coaster rail line, was selected as the director of commuter rail operations for the RTA. Pierce Transit opened Tacoma Dome Station, a multimodal hub for transit in Tacoma, in October 1997 with plans for a second phase that would include a Sounder station. A series of open houses on the designs for new commuter rail stations on the Seattle–Tacoma line were held during the same month. Property acquisition began with the Auburn station area in early 1998.

The Federal Transit Administration (FTA) issued its finding of no significant impact for the Seattle–Tacoma commuter rail project in June 1998 based on an environmental assessment submitted by Sound Transit. During the same month, the $74.7 million contract (equivalent to $137 million in 2025 dollars) to manufacture the first order of 38 passenger cars was awarded to Canadian firm Bombardier Transportation. The company had been the only bidder for the order, which also included an option to purchase 20 additional BiLevel Coach cars for later expansion after the initial start of service scheduled for December 1999. Electro-Motive Division, part of General Motors, won the bid to manufacture the system's locomotives ahead of Boise Locomotive. Sound Transit also awarded contracts to several architect teams to design the six new Sounder stations; a separate agreement was reached with the Washington State Department of Transportation (WSDOT) to accommodate commuter rail service at King Street Station after it underwent renovations. Design work was completed in February 1999, but property acquisition costs in Puyallup and Sumner led to several modifications to the "depot-like" shelters.

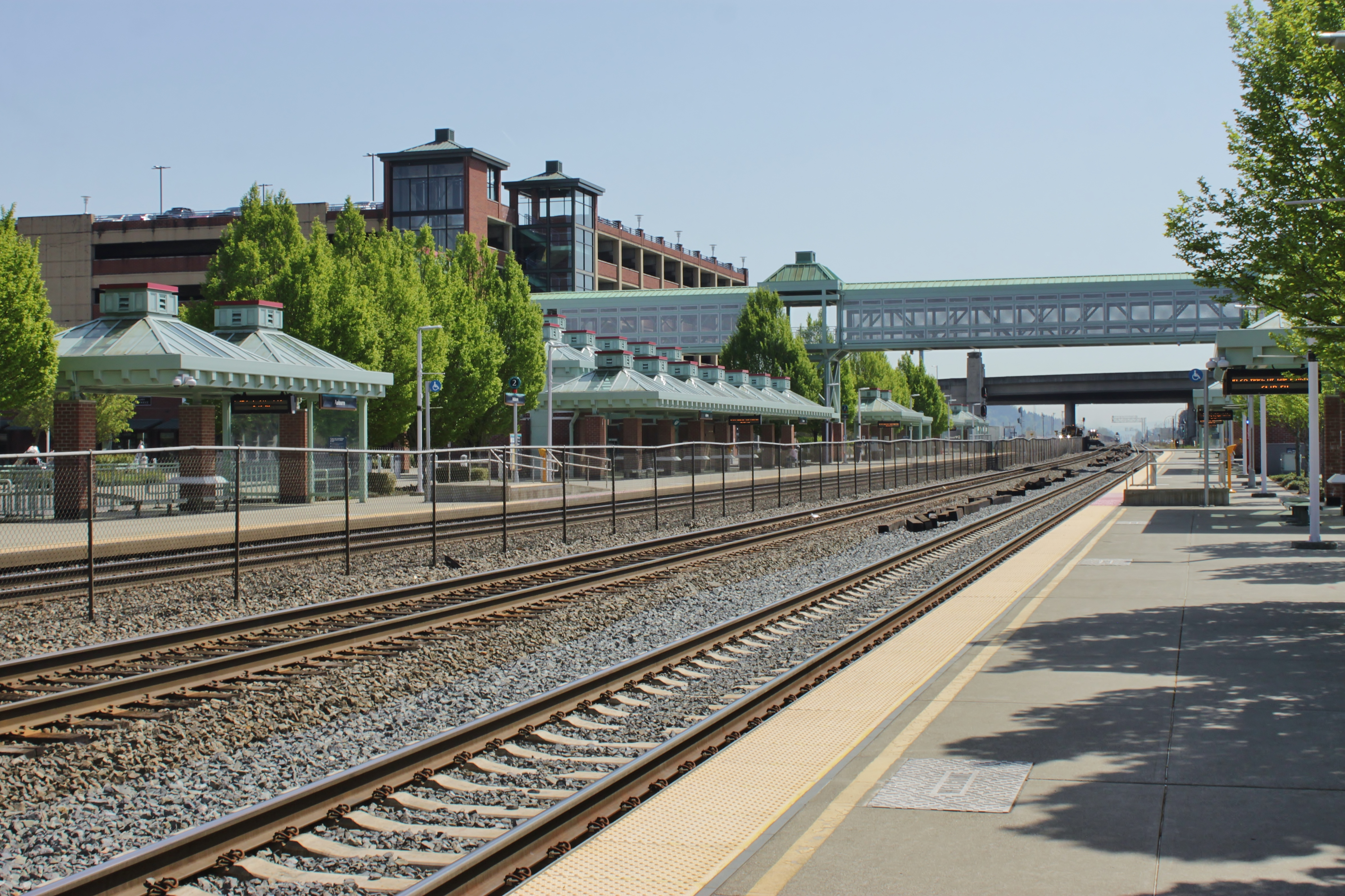
Auburn station, the first Sounder project to begin construction

In April 1999, Sound Transit, WSDOT, BNSF (formerly Burlington Northern), and Union Pacific announced a preliminary agreement to operate Sounder's Seattle–Tacoma line. A total of $319 million (equivalent to $579 million in 2025 dollars) in improvement projects—of which $200 million (equivalent to $363 million in 2025 dollars) would be funded by Sound Transit—was part of the agreement, which was overseen by U.S. Senator Slade Gorton at the request of local officials during an impasse in negotiations. Two months later, Sound Transit signed a ten-year agreement with Amtrak to maintain the Sounder trains at a new operating base in Seattle that would be partially funded by the agency. Construction of the Sounder stations and track improvements formally began with the groundbreaking of Auburn station on August 12, which was followed by another ceremony at King Street Station a week later. BNSF temporarily withdrew from the preliminary agreement in August after it found additional costs for track improvements, but signed an operating contract with Sound Transit by the end of the month. The extended negotiations with BNSF and expanded scope of the track improvements led Sound Transit to delay the launch of regular Sounder service to September 2000.

Initiative 695 (I-695), a statewide referendum to eliminate a motor vehicle excise tax that funded transportation projects, was approved by voters in November 1999. It resulted in reduced funding for WSDOT, including their $47 million share (equivalent to $85.3 million in 2025 dollars) of the Seattle–Tacoma track improvements and the Amtrak maintenance facility in Seattle. Additional stations in Seattle's Georgetown neighborhood and at Boeing Access Road in Tukwila, which had been listed as preliminary options in the Sound Move plan, were deferred by Sound Transit. The Puget Sound Regional Council allocated $60 million (equivalent to $109 million in 2025 dollars) from its federal transportation grants in February 2000 to backfill the tax revenue eliminated by I-695. A final agreement with BNSF was approved by Sound Transit in April after the agency agreed to cover the state government's withdrawn $25 million contribution (equivalent to $45.4 million in 2025 dollars) for track improvements. The first demonstration ride on Sounder for elected officials and journalists took place on December 9, 1999, two weeks after the first trainsets from Bombardier were delivered. The first public demonstration was a one-way trip from Seattle to Tacoma on February 29, 2000, which was followed by three round-trip trains for Seattle Mariners games in April and May. The Mariners service traveled from the existing Tacoma Amtrak station to King Street Station making no intermediate stops; the second trip was sold out and carried 1,020 passengers.

Sounder entered regular service on September 18, 2000, with two daily round trips between a temporary station in Tacoma, Sumner station, Auburn station, and King Street Station in Seattle. A total of 657 passengers rode on the inaugural morning trains, while evening trains carried 452 passengers; ridership did not immediately increase due in part to the limited schedule and temporary Tacoma platform implemented while awaiting negotiations with Tacoma Rail. Further design changes, cost overruns, and construction issues led Sound Transit to delay the opening of several stations, leaving Sounder to debut with only four stations. The Puyallup and Kent stations opened on February 5, 2001, and were followed a month later by Tukwila station and the permanent platform at Sumner station. By then, over 1,800 daily passengers were using the two daily round trips on Sounder. In 2001, Sound Transit added weekend event trains with extra capacity for Seattle Mariners and Seattle Seahawks home games as well as the Washington State Fair in Puyallup. BNSF began construction of the Seattle–Tacoma track improvements that year, which allowed for a third daily round trip to be added to Sounder in September 2002, ahead of the original April 2003 estimate. The temporary Tacoma station was replaced by a dedicated platform at Tacoma Dome Station's Freighthouse Square in September 2003.

=== North Line service begins ===
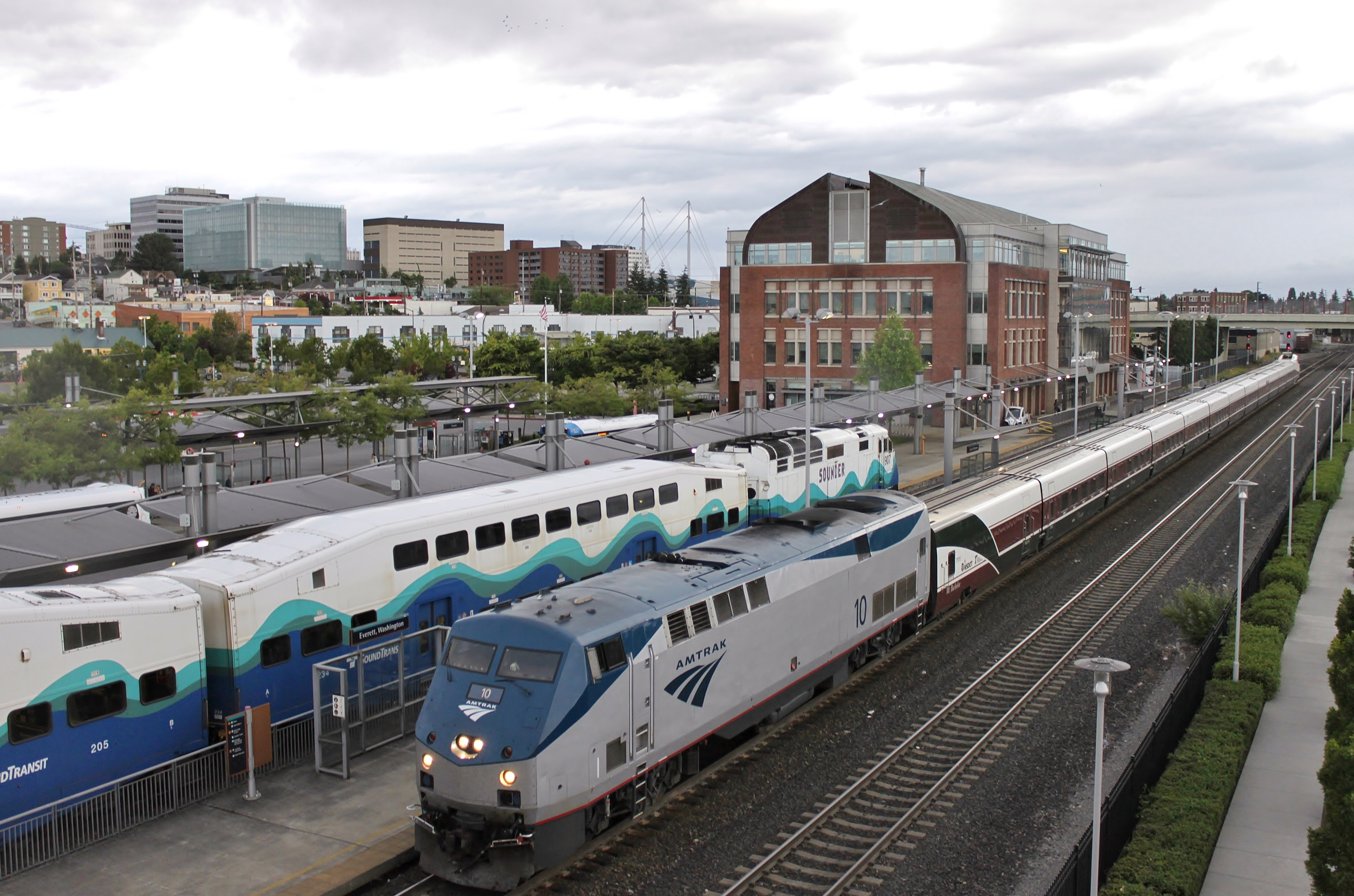
An Amtrak Cascades train (right) passing through Everett Station, the northern terminus of the Sounder system

By early 2002, the estimated cost of the Sounder program had increased 32 percent to $1.02 billion (equivalent to $1.74 billion in 2025 dollars) from the original 1996 budget due to high property costs and unexpected planning issues. These included additional environmental mitigation required on the North Line due to railroad construction along the Puget Sound coastline's habitats for chinook salmon and bull trout, which were added to the federal endangered species list in 2000. Sound Transit had initially proposed 35 acres (14 ha) of fill near Mukilteo and Edmonds to carry a second track, which was later reduced by 90 percent through the use of additional trestle bridges after a review by the Environmental Protection Agency. The coastline work was also criticized by a local group that sought to preserve beachfront land for a future trail and filed a lawsuit against Sound Transit that was dismissed by a King County Superior Court judge. In March 2003, the U.S. Fish and Wildlife Service and National Marine Fisheries Service approved the fill plan, which included funding to restore fish and bald eagle habitats in the Snohomish River estuary.

The Seattle–Everett project's final environmental impact statement had been approved by the FTA in December 1999 and was followed a month later by the selection of station locations. The plan had three provisional stations that were not funded by Sound Move and remained deferred: Broad Street in Downtown Seattle, Ballard, and Richmond Beach in Shoreline. The existing Amtrak station in Everett was removed from consideration by Sound Transit in June 2001 in favor of consolidated multimodal service at the new Everett Station to the east, which opened in February 2002. The negotiations with BNSF missed its original March 2003 deadline set by the FTA to qualify for $25 million (equivalent to $41.9 million in 2025 dollars) in federal contributions, but were allowed to continue until a preliminary agreement was reached two months later, on May 28. The terms allowed for use of the 34-mile (55 km) Everett–Seattle corridor over a 97-year period as well as an option for Sound Transit to purchase a Tacoma–Lakewood branch for a future expansion. The agency agreed to fund $250 million (equivalent to $419 million in 2025 dollars) in track improvements and pay an annual fee to operate four daily round trips on the North Line rather than the original plan of six trips. The announcement by local officials was followed immediately by a ceremonial ride from Everett Station to Seattle on a Sounder train. The lease agreement between Sound Transit and BNSF was finalized on December 17 with a perpetual easement that replaced the original 97-year term and a total cost of $385 million (equivalent to $645 million in 2025 dollars) for the North Line program.

The North Line entered service for a Seattle Seahawks gameday train on December 21, 2003, with departures from Everett and Edmonds stations that carried a total of 710 passengers; the third station in Mukilteo was planned to be built by 2008. Regular service began the following day with one daily round trip and free fares through the end of the month; a total of 213 passengers rode the inaugural morning train. The North Line averaged 315 daily boardings on weekdays in its first year of operation, about half of what Sound Transit had projected, while plans for a second round trip were negotiated with BNSF. The second daily trip debuted on June 6, 2005, and ridership from Everett and Edmonds increased to a weekday average of over 700 daily passengers by October. The remaining two trips were delayed under the terms of the agreement with BNSF, which required environmental permits for projects to be approved two years before service changes. A third round trip was added in September 2007 and was followed by the fourth a year later in response to higher demand amid an increase in gas prices. The first platform at Mukilteo station opened on May 31, 2008, after a year of construction, with a 68-stall park-and-ride lot.

=== ST2 votes and Lakewood extension ===
BNSF completed the first phase of Seattle–Tacoma improvements in February 2004, but the addition of six more planned Sounder runs was delayed due to an overpass project and construction issues with new tracks in Tacoma. The full project, completed in July 2008 at a cost of $350 million (equivalent to $513 million in 2025 dollars), included the construction of nine new crossovers able to handle trains higher speeds and a full replacement of the signal system with centralized traffic control. A fourth round trip was added to the South Line in September 2005 as daily ridership increased to 5,800 on weekdays on the line by the following year. Sound Transit added a temporary fifth train from Puyallup to Seattle in August 2007 to accommodate higher demand during a partial closure of Interstate 5 in Seattle. The expected traffic congestion from the Seattle project drew 12,000 passengers on the first day and an average of 9,480 daily riders over the three-week period. At the end of the following month, two more permanent round trips were added to the South Line with temporary financing from WSDOT and Amtrak that was requested by BNSF. One of the trips was the system's first reverse commute train, named the "City of Density" for Tacoma's nickname, that traveled southbound from Seattle in the morning and northbound from Tacoma in the evening.

The Sound Transit 2 (ST2) plan, initially part of the 2007 Roads and Transit ballot measure, included $280 million (equivalent to $418 million in 2025 dollars) allocated to expanding parking at existing Sounder stations and building new platforms at Edmonds and Tukwila stations. A provisional station near Lakeland Hills or in North Sumner to relieve parking demand on the existing Sumner station and a future extension from Lakewood to Thurston County were both part of the plan but remained unfunded. After the Roads and Transit ballot measure was rejected by 56 percent of voters, Sound Transit approved a transit-only package for the November 2008 election with fewer projects and a 15-year timeline. The revised plan earmarked $1.3 billion (equivalent to $1.91 billion in 2025 dollars) for Sounder projects, retaining the previous proposal's parking and platform improvements, and also funded four additional round trips on the South Line with extended eight-car trains. The unfunded portions were changed to add provisional North Line stations in Ballard and at Broad Street near Downtown Seattle. The standalone ST2 ballot measure was approved by voters and enacted an increase to the regional sales tax and motor vehicle excise tax.

A ninth round trip was added to the South Line in June 2009; it was the last under the 1996 Sound Move ballot measure and original BNSF agreement. Sound Move also funded the construction of a South Line extension 8.5 miles (13.7 km) beyond Tacoma to Lakewood that had originally been scheduled for 2001 but was delayed by over a decade. The extension's two stations, Lakewood and South Tacoma, began construction in 2007 and 2008, respectively. The route through Tacoma and Lakewood would use the Lakeview Subdivision, a former freight line that had been acquired from BNSF in 2004, and be shared with Amtrak Cascades passenger trains on the Point Defiance Bypass. The corridor was connected to Tacoma Dome Station by 1.2 miles (1.9 km) of new tracks in Tacoma, where a planned at-grade crossing of Pacific Avenue was replaced by an overpass to abide by federal rules on daily crossings. The design change was among several factors that delayed the launch of service to Lakewood and increased the total cost of the project to $325 million (equivalent to $450 million in 2025 dollars). On October 8, 2012, the South Line was extended to South Tacoma and Lakewood stations with service on five of the nine daily round trips during peak hours. The total capital cost of the Sounder program from 2000 to 2011 was $1.26 billion (equivalent to $1.78 billion in 2025 dollars), an 88 percent increase from the original estimate.

=== Added trips and 2010s improvements ===
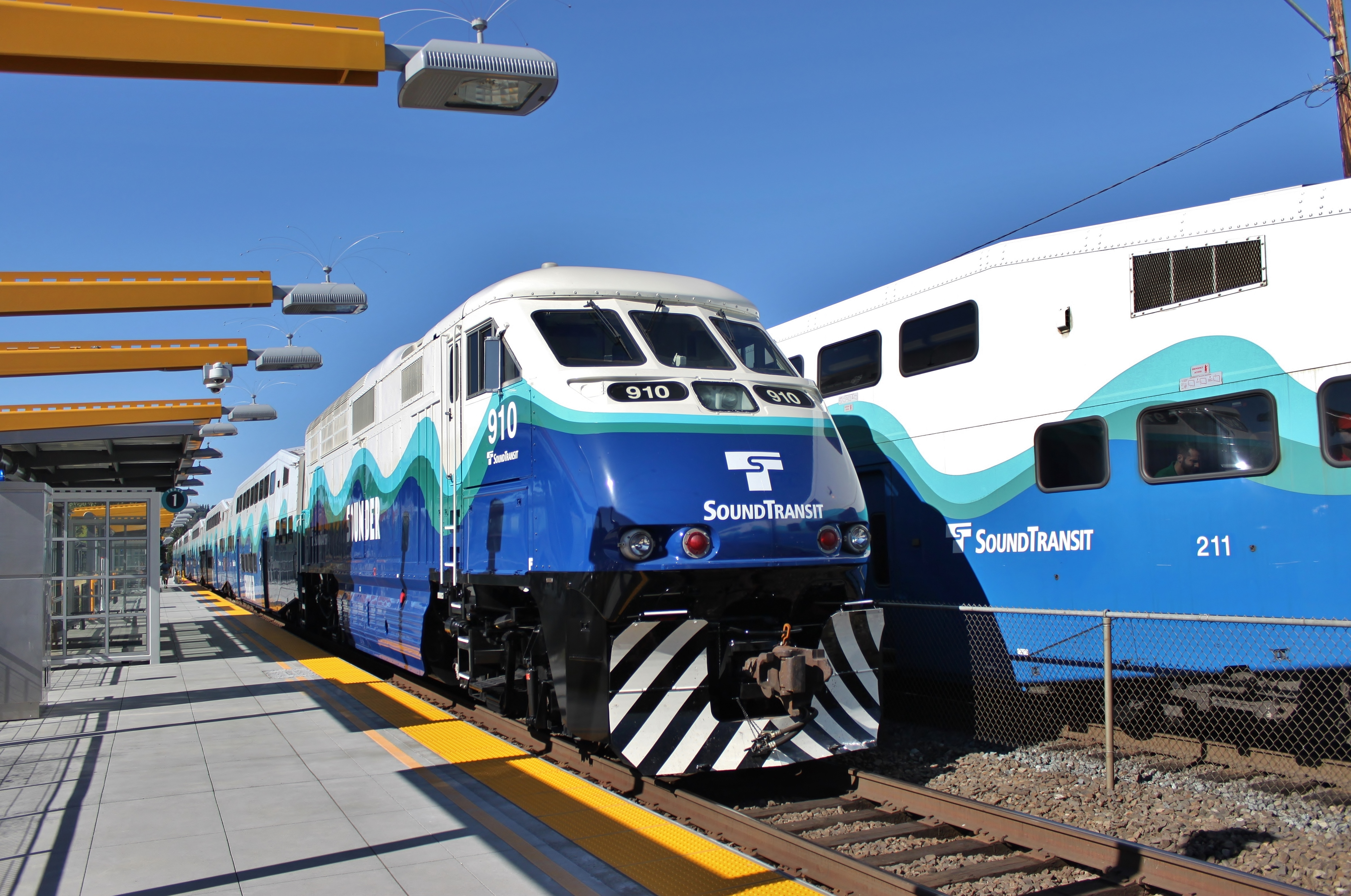
Two Sounder trains at Tukwila station, which was expanded with permanent platforms in 2015

In July 2010, Sound Transit approved a new agreement with BNSF to purchase four permanent easements on the South Line corridor for $185 million (equivalent to $266 million in 2025 dollars) that would be used on additional round trips. The new easements, which could be used for mid-day and reverse commute trips, would be staggered between 2012 and 2016 under the agreement and funded by the ST2 program. The implementation of the new round trips was initially delayed by a year as part of cuts to the ST2 budget due to lower sales tax revenue during the Great Recession and subsequent years. The cuts also delayed the construction of new parking garages at several Sounder stations by several years. Planning and construction proceeded on improvements to North Line stations, beginning with the renovation of Edmonds station in 2011 and the addition of a south platform and pedestrian overpass at Mukilteo station that was completed in March 2016. Two permanent platforms at Tukwila station were completed in 2015 using remaining funds from the Sound Move program and federal grants.

Three new locomotives were acquired by Sound Transit in 2013 to prepare for service expansion and allow for the original fleet to be rehabilitated and retrofitted to meet updated emission standards. The agency loaned a spare Sounder trainset to Amtrak from May 31 to June 20 of that year to operate additional Cascades service from Seattle to Bellingham following the collapse of an Interstate 5 bridge over the Skagit River near Burlington. The loan ceased after a temporary bridge was installed at the site and allowed Interstate 5 to reopen. Sound Transit redistributed its existing passenger cars from the North Line to the South Line in September 2013 to add two additional cars to trips on the busier Seattle–Tacoma corridor. The first new round trip on the South Line to be funded under ST2 debuted that same month and was followed by the system's first regular mid-day trips in September 2016. Two more round trips were added to the line the following year—a peak direction train from Lakewood and a third reverse commute trip from Tacoma. Sound Transit began its replacement of a wooden trestle bridge east of Tacoma Dome Station in June 2016 using funds from ST2 and the federal government. Sounder trains were moved to a new, double-tracked bridge in February 2017 at a cost of $161 million (equivalent to $208 million in 2025 dollars).

Service on the North Line was frequently disrupted by seasonal mudslides that covered or damaged tracks along the coastline section and required passenger trains to be suspended for a minimum of 48 hours after each incident. A record 170 trips on the line were cancelled from September 2012 to March 2013, including several consecutive weeks in late December; the previous record had been 72 cancellations in 2010–2011. WSDOT began work on a major mudslide mitigation project in August 2013 with $16.1 million (equivalent to $21.9 million in 2025 dollars) in federal funding to install barriers, construct retaining walls, and stabilize slopes above the tracks. By late 2016, six projects along the Everett–Seattle corridor had been completed by WSDOT and BNSF to prevent further mudslides.

=== Service reductions and restoration ===
Sound Transit announced major reductions to its services in response to the outbreak of the COVID-19 pandemic and a large decline in ridership. Beginning on March 23, 2020, the South Line was reduced to eight round trips and the North Line only had two round trips—both halved from their normal schedules. Due to staffing issues, another South Line trip was cancelled in April; by then, commuter rail ridership had declined by 92 percent. Fare collection and enforcement was suspended during the first months of the pandemic, but resumed on June 1 with a temporary "recovery fare" for the month. South Line service was increased to nine round trips in September 2020 and was fully restored to its thirteen-trip schedule in September 2022. Trains were temporarily shortened to five cars in 2022 and 2023 due to staffing shortages at Amtrak that prevented longer trainsets from being fully maintained.

A new naming scheme for Sound Transit rail services was introduced in September 2021, with the North Line and South Line becoming the N Line and S Line, respectively. Sounder ridership on weekdays remained low compared to its pre-pandemic performance, especially on the N Line, due to reduced demand for commuting into Downtown Seattle. The N Line remained at its reduced, two-trip schedule until service was restored in September 2024. 8 of 34 daily Sounder trips were cancelled for several weeks in February 2025 due to a shortage of available equipment after discrepancies in Amtrak's inspection reports were discovered. A total of 16 railcars were pulled from service due to insufficient time to be fully inspected, which was expected to take up to six weeks. In the interim, the remaining trips ran with shorter trains and Sounder passengers were allowed to use Amtrak Cascades trains with their original payment method.

== Service and operations ==
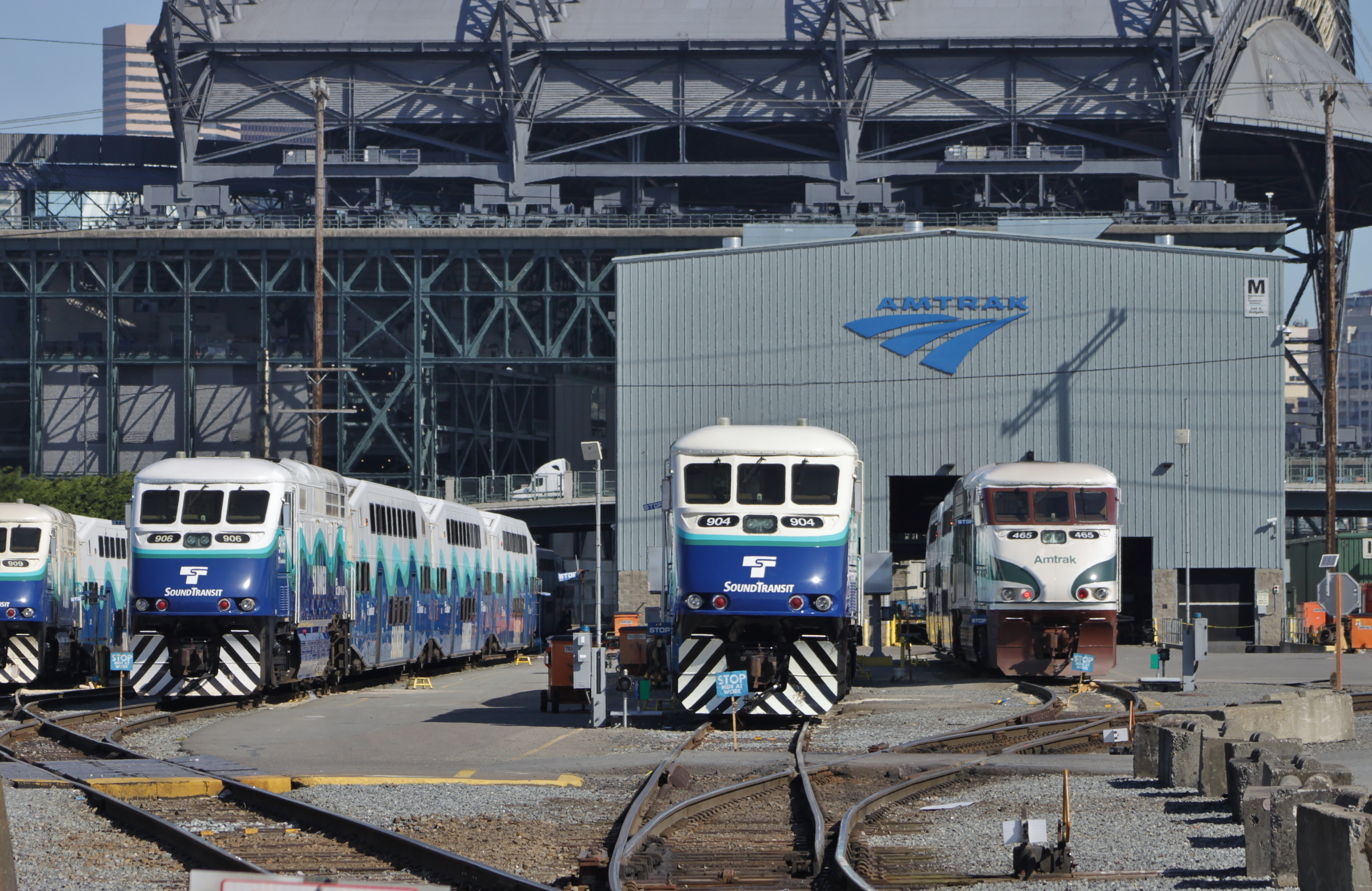
Trains in the Sounder (left) and Amtrak (right) liveries at their shared maintenance facility in Seattle

Sounder generally serves rush hour commuters and runs almost entirely on weekdays, with most trains traveling inbound to Seattle in the morning and outbound to the suburbs in the afternoon and evening. Service is also suspended for major holidays and a reduced schedule is used for certain days before or after holidays. Sound Transit also runs occasional weekend trains for special events at Lumen Field and T-Mobile Park in Seattle. These include home games for the Mariners, Seahawks, and Sounders, as well as large concerts. Weekday event service for Lumen Field was introduced for five of the six matches during the 2025 FIFA Club World Cup and all six matches during the 2026 FIFA World Cup. Sounder trains also operate from Everett to Puyallup on select September weekends for the annual Washington State Fair.

The N Line has four daily round trips that depart Everett from 6:15 a.m. to 7:45 a.m. and depart from Seattle from 4:05 p.m. to 5:41 p.m.; trains take 59 minutes to travel the full length of the line. The S Line has thirteen daily round trips, of which three are reverse commute trips that travel outbound to the suburbs in the morning and inbound to Seattle in the afternoon. The peak-direction trips have an approximate frequency of 20 minutes; only eight of the ten peak-direction trips serve Lakewood and South Tacoma stations, while the rest terminate at Tacoma Dome Station due to capacity limits on the single-track section. There is one mid-day trip that provides service between the rush hour schedules for the line, which is generally paused from 9 a.m. to 2:30 p.m. Sounder trips are numbered from 1500 to 1525 on the S Line and 1700 to 1707 on the N Line.

Sound Transit contracts with BNSF Railway for dispatching and staffing of conductors and engineers who operate Sounder trains, which primarily use tracks owned by the company. BNSF charges a per-mile fee to operate the trains on behalf of Sound Transit. Sounder trains are maintained and serviced by Amtrak, primarily at their Seattle facility in the SoDo neighborhood near King Street Station. Maintenance work is also conducted at two overnight layover facilities near the outbound termini—Everett Station and the Century Yard in Lakewood. A 40-year lease of the commuter rail fleet to Amtrak was approved by Sound Transit in 2000; Amtrak also signed a sub-lease with BNSF for operations of the fleet during the same term. Security personnel and fare enforcement on trains and at stations are provided by other contracted companies. In 2024, the operations and maintenance costs of Sounder totaled $91.3 million.

=== Fares ===
Sounder operates under a proof-of-payment system in which passenger fares are checked by Sound Transit employees; passengers enter the fare control area without passing through turnstile barriers. Adult passenger fares are calculated based on distance traveled and range from $3.25 to $5.75; the base fare is $3.05 and the distance rate is 5.5 cents per mile, rounded to the nearest 25-cent increment. A flat rate of $1 is charged for senior citizens and passengers with disabilities enrolled in the Regional Reduced Fare Permit program, or low-income passengers enrolled in the ORCA Lift program. The distance-based fare system was introduced in June 2007 to replace a three-zone fare structure that ranged from $2 to $4 for a one-way adult ticket. Since September 2022, all fares for passengers under the age of 19 have been free as part of a statewide program.

Fares can be purchased as paper tickets at the stations' ticket vending machines, credit or passes loaded on an ORCA card, or through a mobile ticketing app. ORCA card users are required to tap their card or device at a card reader before boarding and after arriving at their destination station to calculate the fare, or pay the highest maximum fare by default; the card also provides free transfers to other eligible transit systems within a two-hour window. The card readers also accept other forms of contactless payment, including credit and debit cards. Sounder fares on the N Line corridor are able to be used on select weekday Amtrak Cascades trains serving Everett, Edmonds, and Seattle as part of the RailPlus program. The system, introduced in October 2004 by Sound Transit and Amtrak, allows Sounder riders with monthly passes to redeem Amtrak tickets for Cascades trips, which do not serve Mukilteo station; the Empire Builder is excluded from the program. Sound Transit also accepts Amtrak tickets between the three stations as part of the program.

Fares are enforced by uniformed "fare ambassadors" who board random trains and check all passengers for valid proof-of-payment. Passengers without valid proof-of-payment are given up to two warnings before being issued a $50 or $75 citation; after the fourth violation, a civil infraction is issued with an additional fine. The fare ambassadors program was introduced in 2023 after a three-year pause in fare enforcement that began with the outbreak of the COVID-19 pandemic; fare enforcement was previously conducted in a similar manner by security officers, which was found to disproportionally affect Black passengers. From March to June 2020, all fares on Sound Transit services were completely suspended due to the inability to enforce fares. Fares were reintroduced on June 1 with a discounted rate of $2 for non-ORCA users on Sounder until the end of the month. A flat fare of $1.50 for youth passengers and low-income passengers enrolled in the ORCA Lift program debuted in March 2021; the ORCA Lift rate was reduced to $1 in September 2022 as part of a demonstration project that was made permanent the following year.

=== Ridership ===
Total ridership on Sounder by year
Year	Ridership	%±
2000	89,552	—
2001	562,386	528.3%
2002	672,495	19.6%
2003	751,200	11.7%
2004	955,298	27.2%
2005	1,268,291	32.8%
2006	1,692,971	33.5%
2007	2,156,652	27.4%
2008	2,668,623	23.7%
2009	2,492,362	-6.6%
2010	2,364,290	-5.1%
2011	2,543,955	7.6%
2012	2,811,891	10.5%
2013	3,035,735	8%
2014	3,361,317	10.7%
2015	3,851,888	14.6%
2016	4,162,641	8.1%
2017	4,445,568	6.8%
2018	4,646,271	4.5%
2019	4,616,656	-0.6%
2020	1,274,219	-72.4%
2021	734,481	-42.4%
2022	1,269,923	72.9%
2023	1,755,751	38.3%
2024	1,916,429	9.2%
2025	2,090,709	9.1%

In 2025, the two Sounder lines carried a total of 2,090,709 passengers and averaged 7,827 boardings on weekdays. The system generated $6.8 million in fares, which covered 8 percent of operating expenses. Approximately 93.6 percent of trips on the Sounder system were carried by the S Line; the N Line accounted for 0.5 percent of weekday boardings but 16 percent of special event boardings during 34 dates in 2025. In June 2024, the N Line had an average of 362 weekday passengers, while the S Line averaged 6,948 passengers. Ridership is measured by on-board infrared automated passenger counters that are installed on every Sounder car; they record the number of people entering and leaving the train. The data is collected for use in annual reports to the Federal Transit Administration's National Transit Database.

Sounder ridership relies heavily on commuters to Downtown Seattle and has fluctuated based on economic factors and the addition of new trips. The 2007–2008 financial crisis and a rise in the cost of gasoline drew new riders to the commuter rail system, which had a 32 percent increase in S Line ridership and 45 percent on the N Line. Ridership declined slightly in 2009 but recovered within the following two years. The N Line's ridership declined from its peak in June 2008, with daily boardings decreasing from 1,200 to 700 by December 2010; the limited schedule of four daily round-trips, seasonal closures due to mudslides, lack of parking at stations, and indirect routing along the coast were cited as factors. The N Line had a projected ridership of 2,400 to 3,200 daily passengers, while the overall system would carry 30,000 daily passengers by 2025.

From 2000 to 2010, Sounder carried a total of 14.7 million passengers and had ridership increase by an average of 21 percent annually. The S Line had further growth in ridership in the 2010s and doubled its boardings to over 16,000 daily passengers by 2019 after additional round-trips on the line were launched by Sound Transit. The system reached its peak of 4.6 million passengers in 2019, with a weekday average of 1,574 passengers on the N Line and 16,419 on the S Line. The effects of the COVID-19 pandemic in 2020 reduced demand on many commuter rail systems, including Sounder, as remote work was adopted by downtown employers. By late 2022, daily Sounder ridership had recovered to 32 percent of the 2019 average and increased by 38.4 percent in 2023 due to "return to office" policies. The S Line is predicted to lose riders with the opening of new Link light rail extensions to Federal Way and Tacoma by the 2030s, reaching approximately 5.95 million annual riders by 2042.

== Rolling stock ==
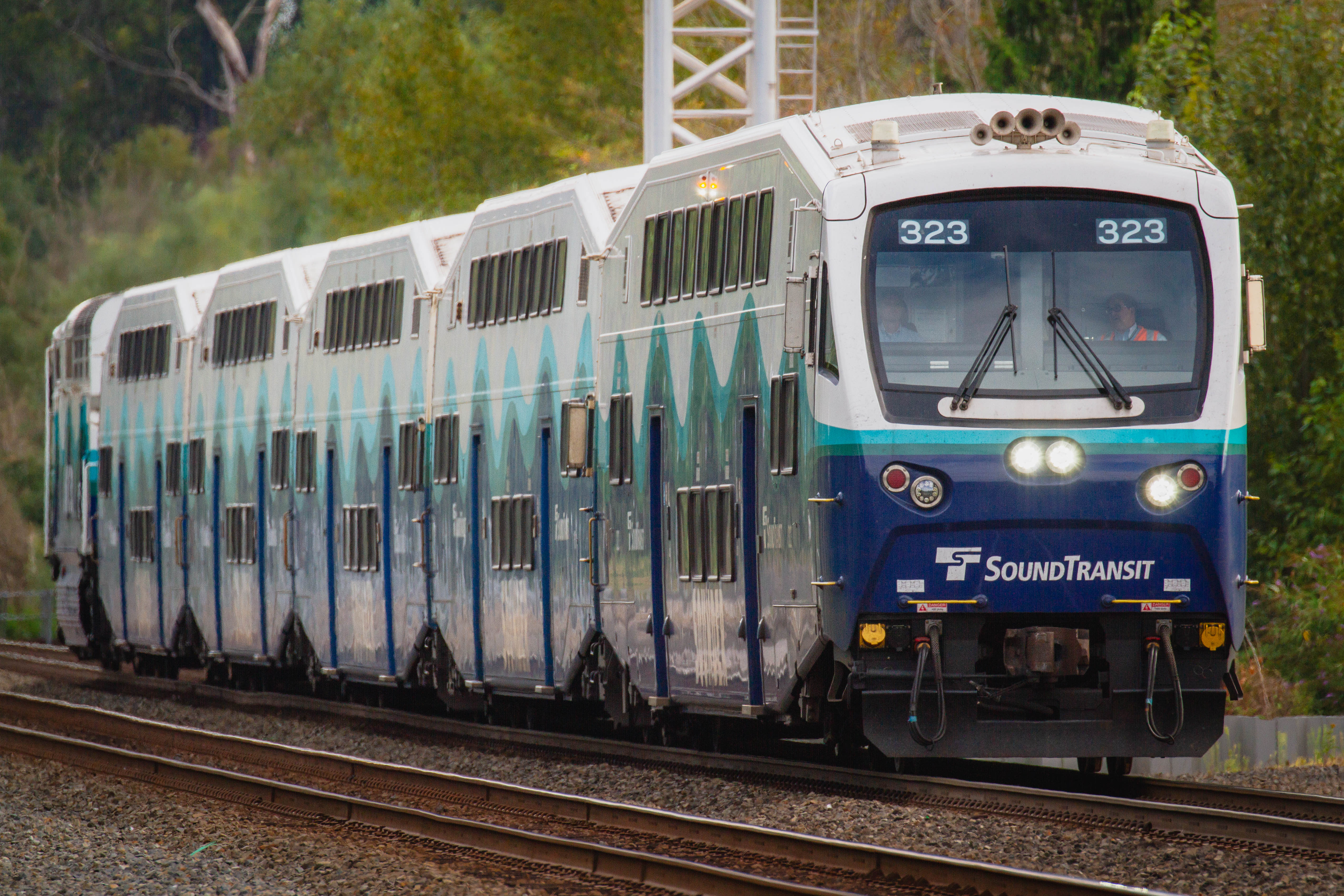
A five-car trainset on the S Line, led by a cab car, near Tukwila station

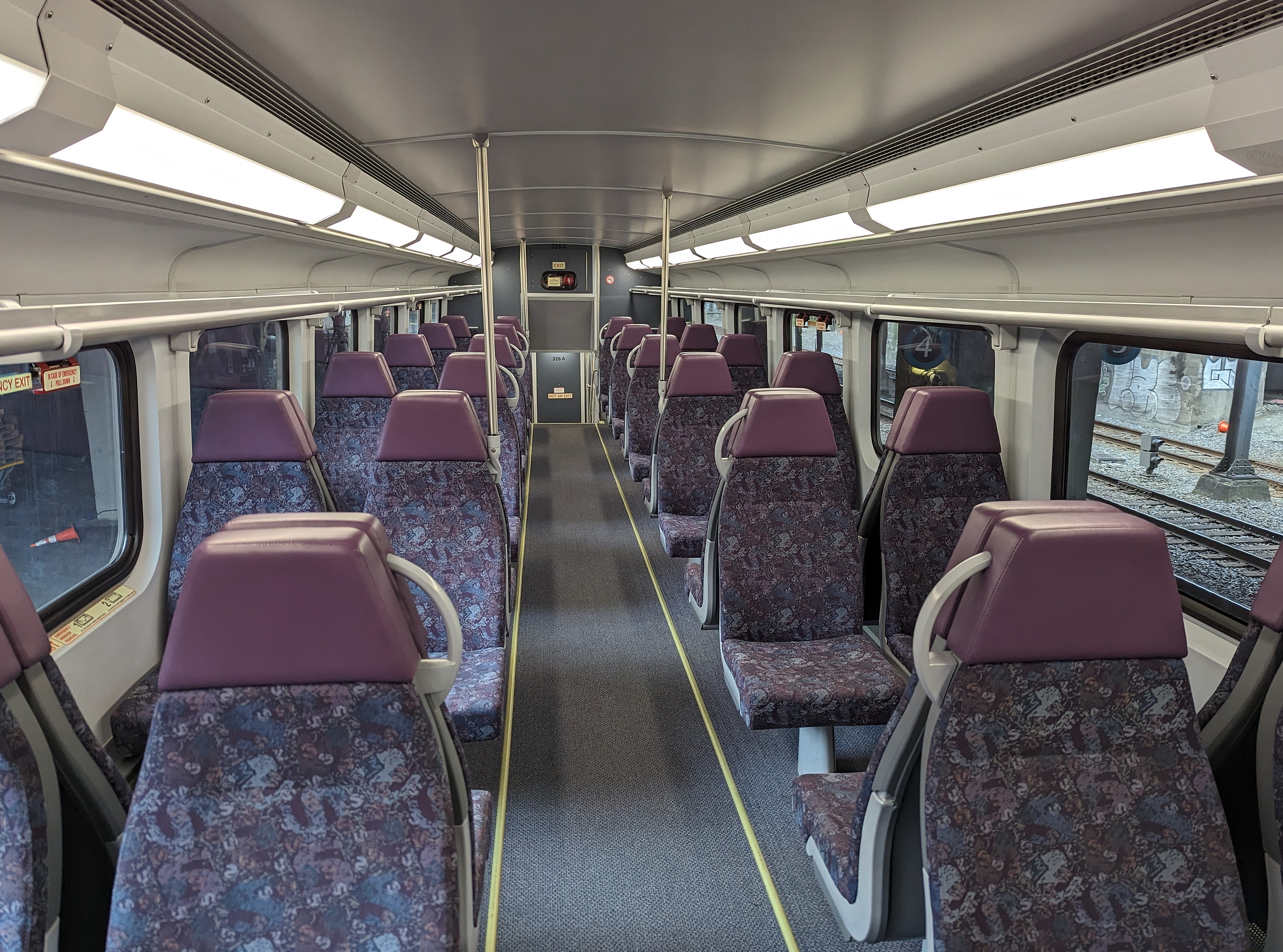
The upper deck of a Bombardier BiLevel Coach passenger car used on Sounder

Sound Transit owns a fleet of 14 diesel locomotives and 78 bilevel passenger cars that are used on both Sounder lines. The Bombardier BiLevel Coach passenger cars comprise 48 conventional coach cars and 30 cab cars that can be used to operate trains from the opposite end of the locomotive. Each passenger car has 130 to 148 upholstered seats arranged in pairs, air conditioning, and one on-board restroom that is designed to be fully accessible. The cars also have a designated space for four wheelchairs, seats with cupholders, and tables with power outlets. Most cars have two spaces for bicycles, while cab cars can carry up to six. The trains also have on-board Wi-Fi that is provided for free by Sound Transit; the service began in 2009 as a pilot project and expanded to all passenger cars in the fleet by 2016. Sounder trains have a maximum speed of 79 miles per hour (127 km/h) and have been fully equipped with satellite-based positive train control since 2018.

The locomotives are 58 feet 7 inches (17.86 m) long and 15 feet 11 inches (4.85 m) tall, while the passenger cars are 85 feet (26 m) long and 15 feet 11 inches (4.85 m) tall. The first eleven locomotives were manufactured by the Electro-Motive Diesel (EMD) division of General Motors and delivered from 1999 to 2001; they were followed by three MotivePower MP40PH-3C locomotives delivered in 2012 to replace EMD locomotives during rebuilding to meet updated emissions standards. A 2010 proposal to use diesel multiple unit trains on the N Line, which carries fewer passengers, was considered by Sound Transit but ultimately rejected.

Several surplus Sounder trainsets were leased to other U.S. commuter railroads in the 2000s due to delays in expanding service in the Seattle area. Virginia Railway Express leased three locomotives and eighteen bilevel passenger cars from Sound Transit from 2001 to 2008; a locomotive and 12 cars were leased in 2004 to Metrolink, a commuter rail system in Southern California, and returned in 2009. Caltrain in the San Francisco Bay Area purchased 5 locomotives and 17 passenger cars in 2001 after Sound Transit delayed the launch of additional round-trips on Sounder.

Active Sounder rolling stock
Type	Model	No.	Qty.	Year	Image	Notes
Locomotives	EMD F59PHI	901–911	11	1999–2001	A large locomotive in the Sounder livery with "905" painted on the side	Engines were rebuilt to meet updated fuel emissions standards
Locomotives	MotivePower MP40PH-3C	921–923	3	2012	A streamlined locomotive in the Sounder livery with "922" painted on the side	
Cab cars	Bombardier BiLevel cab car	101–111	11	1999–2001	A double-decker passenger car in the Sounder livery with "111" displayed on two signs at its rear	
Cab cars	Bombardier BiLevel cab car	301–307	7	2003	A double-decker passenger car in the Sounder livery with "111" displayed on two signs at its rear	
Cab cars	Bombardier BiLevel cab car	321–329	9	2017	A double-decker passenger car in the Sounder livery with a large windshield in the operator's cab	
Cab cars	Bombardier BiLevel cab car	330–332	3	2022	A double-decker passenger car in the Sounder livery with a large windshield in the operator's cab	
Coaches	Bombardier BiLevel Coach	201–240	30	1999–2003	A double-decker passenger car in the Sounder livery	Passenger cars 219–226 and 229–230 were sold to Caltrain in 2001.
Coaches	Bombardier BiLevel Coach	401–410	10	2003	A double-decker passenger car in the Sounder livery	
Coaches	Bombardier BiLevel Coach	411–418	8	2022	A double-decker passenger car in the Sounder livery	

== Future plans ==
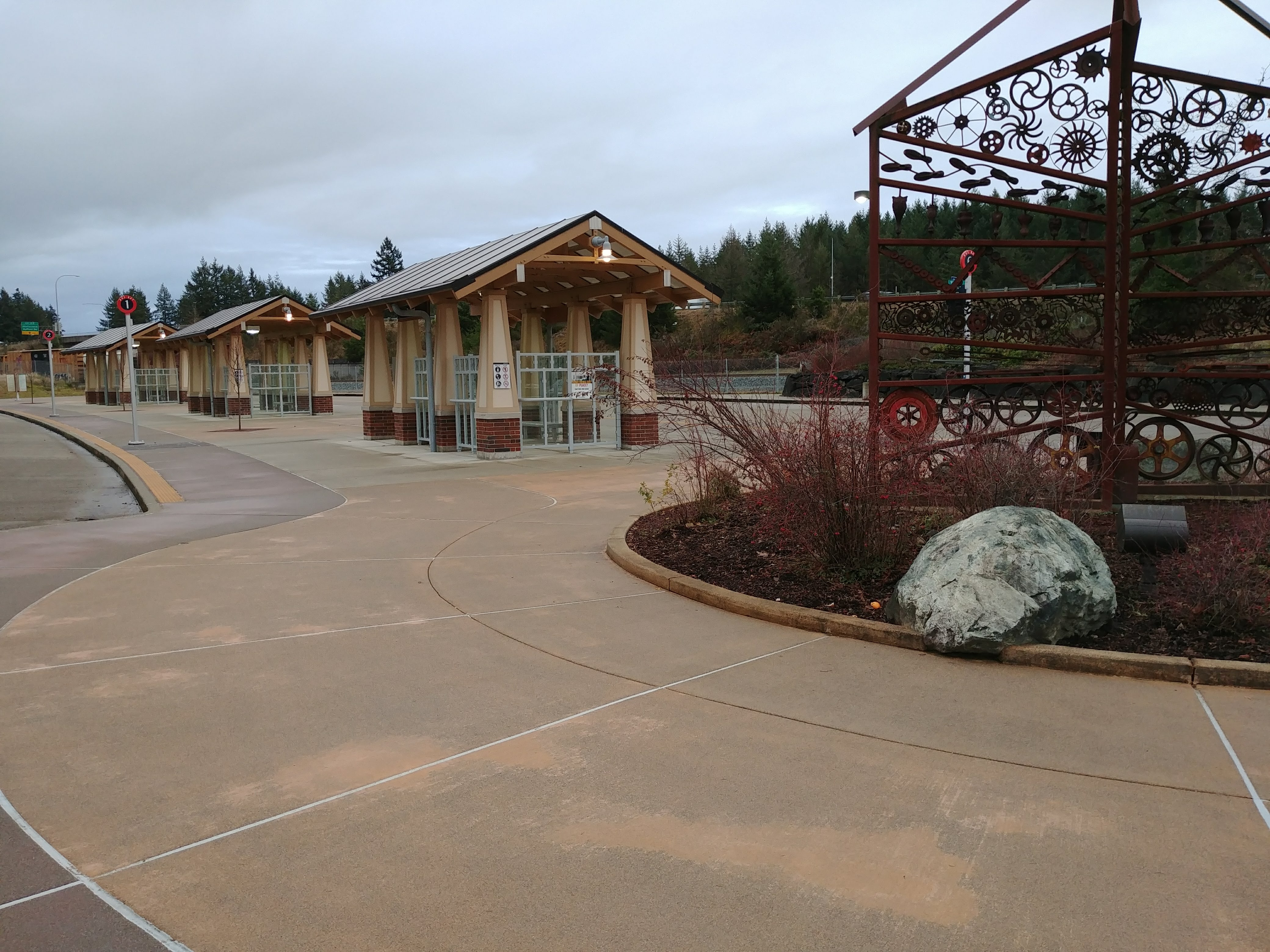
The DuPont transit center, the planned terminus of the S Line following expansion in 2045

The ST2 ballot measure, approved by voters in 2008, included funding for additional parking garages at four S Line stations that would open in the 2020s. The project was originally set to add 2,000 parking stalls to the existing inventory of 3,741 stalls along the line, which regularly filled on weekdays prior to the COVID-19 pandemic. By 2023, the cost of the garages increased to $359 million—an average of $200,000 per stall—despite cuts to the scope. The first new garage, at Puyallup station with 510 stalls, opened in 2023; it is scheduled to be followed by the remaining three garages by 2027. Two S Line stations, Lakewood and South Tacoma, will instead have improvements to pedestrian and cycling infrastructure funded under the same program.

Several potential long-term improvements to the S Line were included in the Sound Transit 3 ballot measure, which was passed by voters in 2016 and allocated $1.2 billion for the corridor. Among the proposals are additional trips, including mid-day and regular weekend service, that would require negotiations with BNSF. Plans to extend the existing station platforms to accommodate ten-car trains, a capacity increase of 40 percent from the seven-car maximum, were originally scheduled to be completed by 2028. The platform extensions were delayed to 2036 after a realignment of project schedules in 2021 due to a funding shortfall caused by the COVID-19 pandemic. The additional trips were delayed to 2046 under the same realignment plan. A new maintenance base at the Century Yard in Lakewood is planned to be completed in 2034.

In 2026, Sound Transit proposed ending service on the N Line by 2033 to address a funding gap in the Sound Transit 3 plan, which would instead extend Link light rail service to Everett. The plan was approved in May 2026.

=== DuPont extension ===
Sound Transit 3 also funded a 7.8-mile (12.6 km) extension of the S Line from Lakewood to new stations at Tillicum and DuPont. The extension would use the existing Point Defiance Bypass constructed by Sound Transit, with a second track added in some sections, and generally follow the Interstate 5 corridor near Joint Base Lewis–McChord. Both stations would include park-and-ride lots, while the terminus at DuPont station would be adjacent to an existing transit center that was opened in 2003. The extension was originally scheduled to open in 2036, but was delayed to 2045 during the 2021 project realignment process. As of 2024, the project has an estimated cost of $480 million.

=== Other proposals ===
Various proposals to study or construct extensions of the Sounder system beyond the Everett–Lakewood corridor have been included in preliminary project lists for Sound Transit's expansion packages. The Snohomish County cities of Arlington and Marysville, along with the Tulalip Tribes, proposed an annexation into the Sound Transit district to allow for the North Line to be extended through the area. A preliminary study into commuter rail service from Everett to Blaine at the Canada–United States border was commissioned by the state government in 2001 and concluded that an extension of Sounder could serve a viable market should congestion on Interstate 5 continue to worsen. An extension to Olympia was included in the Roads and Transit package and studied by the Thurston County government, but would require annexation or a special agreement with Sound Transit to operate beyond its boundaries.

The early ST2 projects list included two spur routes in southern Pierce County that would cost an estimated $350 million to construct and operate: an eleven-mile (18 km) line to the Frederickson industrial area; and a four-mile (6.4 km) route from Puyallup to McMillin. An extended version of the McMillin spur with service to Orting was revived as an early candidate in ST3, but was not selected for further study and development.
