= Point Defiance Bypass =

Rail line in Pierce County, Washington, United States

Overview
- Stations: 3

Service
- Services: Cascades, Coast Starlight, Sounder S Line

History
- Completed: 1891

Technical
- Line length: 14.5 mi (23.3 km)
- Track gauge: 1,435 mm (4 ft 8 1/2 in) standard gauge

The Point Defiance Bypass (officially the Lakewood Subdivision) is a 14.5-mile-long (23.3 km) rail line between the cities of DuPont and Tacoma in Pierce County, Washington. It was originally built by the Northern Pacific Railway – the Tacoma–Lakewood segment in 1874 as part of the Prairie Line, and the Lakewood–DuPont section in 1891. Passenger service on the lines declined after the 1914 completion of a flatter route along Puget Sound, and ended entirely in 1956.

The route was identified as a passenger rail bypass in 1992. Sounder commuter rail service to Lakewood began in 2012. The $181.1 million improvement of the remaining section began construction in 2015 as part of general improvements to the Amtrak Cascades corridor to eliminate the slow and winding route along the Puget Sound shoreline that included single-track tunnels. It was opened for Amtrak service on December 18, 2017, but the first Cascades train derailed at speed on a bridge over Interstate 5 while traveling southbound near DuPont. Amtrak service was rerouted to the old line until passenger service resumed on November 18, 2021.

== Route ==
The Point Defiance Bypass begins at a junction with the BNSF mainline near the Nisqually River bridge, east of Lacey. The railway crosses over Interstate 5 and travels along the freeway's north side through DuPont and Joint Base Lewis–McChord (JBLM). In Lakewood, it stops at a train station and turns north, merging with the Tacoma Rail mainline. Trains continue north through South Tacoma station and follow South Tacoma Way as it makes a gradual turn to the east. The bypass passes under State Route 16 and over Pacific Avenue while approaching Tacoma Dome Station. The railway travels over the Dome District area of Tacoma along a high trestle bridge and rejoins the BNSF mainline near the Puyallup River bridge.

The project included the construction of five upgraded at-grade crossings and several grade-separated overpasses and underpasses along Interstate 5 in Dupont and near JBLM.

== History ==
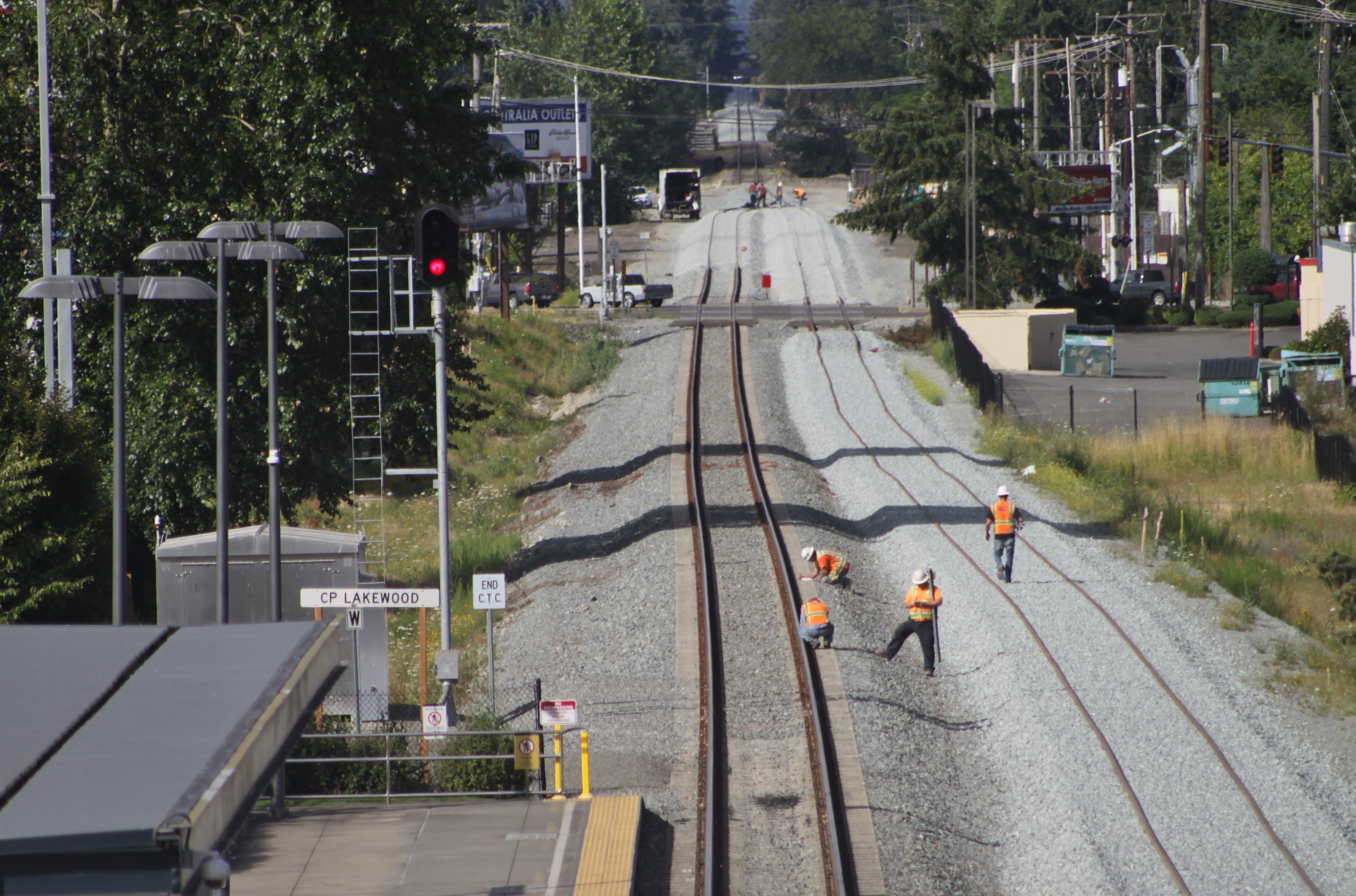
A section of the Point Defiance Bypass in Lakewood, seen from Lakewood station

The Northern Pacific Railway (NP) opened the Prairie Line – part of its planned transcontinental mainline – through Yelm and Lakewood on January 5, 1874. On May 1, 1891, the NP-owned Tacoma, Olympia & Grays Harbor Railroad completed a 24.7-mile-long (39.8 km) branch of the Northern Pacific between Lakeview (near modern Lakewood) and Lacey, passing through the Fort Lewis military base. By 1914, the NP (plus the GN and UP under trackage rights) operated 11 daily round trips over the Prairie Line, plus 3 daily round trips to Grays Harbor over the newer branch.

Just south of Tacoma, the Prairie Line had a 2.2-mile (3.5 km) section of difficult 2.2% grade. In 1914, the NP opened the Point Defiance Line along the coast of Puget Sound and around Point Defiance. Part of the line to Grays Harbor was used by the new line; the section between DuPont and Lakewood became the American Lake Branch. Most NP and UP passenger and freight service moved to the newer, flatter line. On August 8, 1943, the GN moved its remaining Seattle–Portland round trip to the Point Defiance Line, leaving only NP trains to Grays Harbor on the old line. Those trains were discontinued in February 1956, leaving the American Lake Branch and the Tacoma–Tenino section of the Prairie Line used only by freight service. The GN and NP were merged into the Burlington Northern Railway (BN) in 1970. In 1973, the BN increased clearances on the Point Defiance Line, allowing trains carrying Boeing aircraft parts to use that line. Long-distance freight service was removed from the Prairie Line, and it was abandoned south of Yelm in 1986.

The Point Defiance Line, however, proved not to be ideal for Amtrak passenger service. Mudslides frequently closed the line, and the 1988 conversion of two tunnels to single track to further increase freight clearances limited capacity. In 1992, the Washington State Department of Transportation (WSDOT) identified the American Lake Branch and the northern section of the Prairie Line as a potential alignment for a new Amtrak bypass of Point Defiance. In April 2003, the BNSF Railway (the successor to the BN) removed the remaining 2.1 miles (3.4 km) of the Prairie Line in Tacoma from service, thus allowing Sound Transit to build the Tacoma Link without an expensive level crossing. In return, Sound Transit funded repairs to the American Lake Branch for continued BNSF freight service to Fort Lewis, while Tacoma Rail took over freight service on the line in Tacoma. BNSF sold the Tacoma–Lakewood section to Sound Transit for commuter rail use in 2004 for $13.4 million, with BNSF retaining a freight easement. This sale was part of a larger, $32 million purchase of 21 miles of BNSF track between Tacoma and the Nisqually River (at the border between Pierce County and Thurston County).

WSDOT published a long-range plan for the Amtrak Cascades corridor in 2006, outlining a series of projects needed before reactivating passenger rail service on the line. The projects, known collectively as the Point Defiance Bypass, included rebuilding of tracks and ties, a new signal system, improvements to at-grade crossings, and a $230 million bridge to replace a viaduct crossing Interstate 5 on a tight curve near the Nisqually River. The project ultimately did not include the Nisqually bridge, which became the site of the 2017 derailment.

The Point Defiance Bypass project underwent environmental review in 2006 and started final design in 2007. The $181 million project was funded through transportation packages previously approved by the state legislature, as well as the federal stimulus package of 2009. Officials from Lakewood and DuPont voiced their concerns about safety and increased traffic congestion resulting from the bypass's construction, leading to concessions in the final design by the state. Construction began in 2009, with the northern end connecting to the former Milwaukee Road main line at Tacoma Dome Station, and Sounder commuter rail service to Lakewood began in October 2012. Construction on the Nisqually–Lakewood segment began in 2015 and was completed in late 2016. Testing of trains at speeds of up to 79 miles per hour (127 km/h) was conducted from January 2017 to December 2017. The final element of the Bypass was the replacement of the aging Milwaukee Road trestle in Tacoma, with a modern two-track concrete viaduct replacing the wooden trestle in 2018.

The bypass is planned to carry twelve daily Amtrak trains on the Cascades and Coast Starlight. Sound Transit purchased 1.4 miles (2.3 km) of the track from the City of Tacoma in 2026 for $10 million as part of an agreement to address drainage issues near Tacoma Dome Station. The agency plans to extend Sounder commuter rail service to DuPont in 2036, with an additional station at Berkeley Street.

=== 2017 derailment ===
On December 18, 2017, during the inaugural southbound run of the Cascades on the Point Defiance Bypass, the train derailed while crossing Interstate 5 near the Nisqually River. Resulting train wreckage smashed into eight road vehicles below the overpass and of the 84 people (77 passengers and 7 employees) on board, three were killed.

After the accident, which closed the bypass to Amtrak service, WSDOT announced that it would not resume service until the full implementation of positive train control (PTC). (Sounder service to Lakewood continued to operate.) Service was then scheduled to restart in early 2019. The PTC system was fully installed by late 2018 and activated on the Point Defiance Bypass in March 2019. The National Transportation Safety Board presented its final report on the accident on May 21, 2019, with WSDOT issuing a subsequent statement that they would need time to analyze the report before resuming service on the line. The restoration of Amtrak service on the Point Defiance Bypass was then tentatively scheduled for 2020, after agreements with local officials and the arrival of new Talgo trainsets.

Passenger service on the bypass resumed on November 18, 2021, following delays due to the COVID-19 pandemic.

== See also ==
Media related to Point Defiance Bypass at Wikimedia Commons
