= Lakewood station =

Commuter train station in Lakewood, Washington

Lakewood
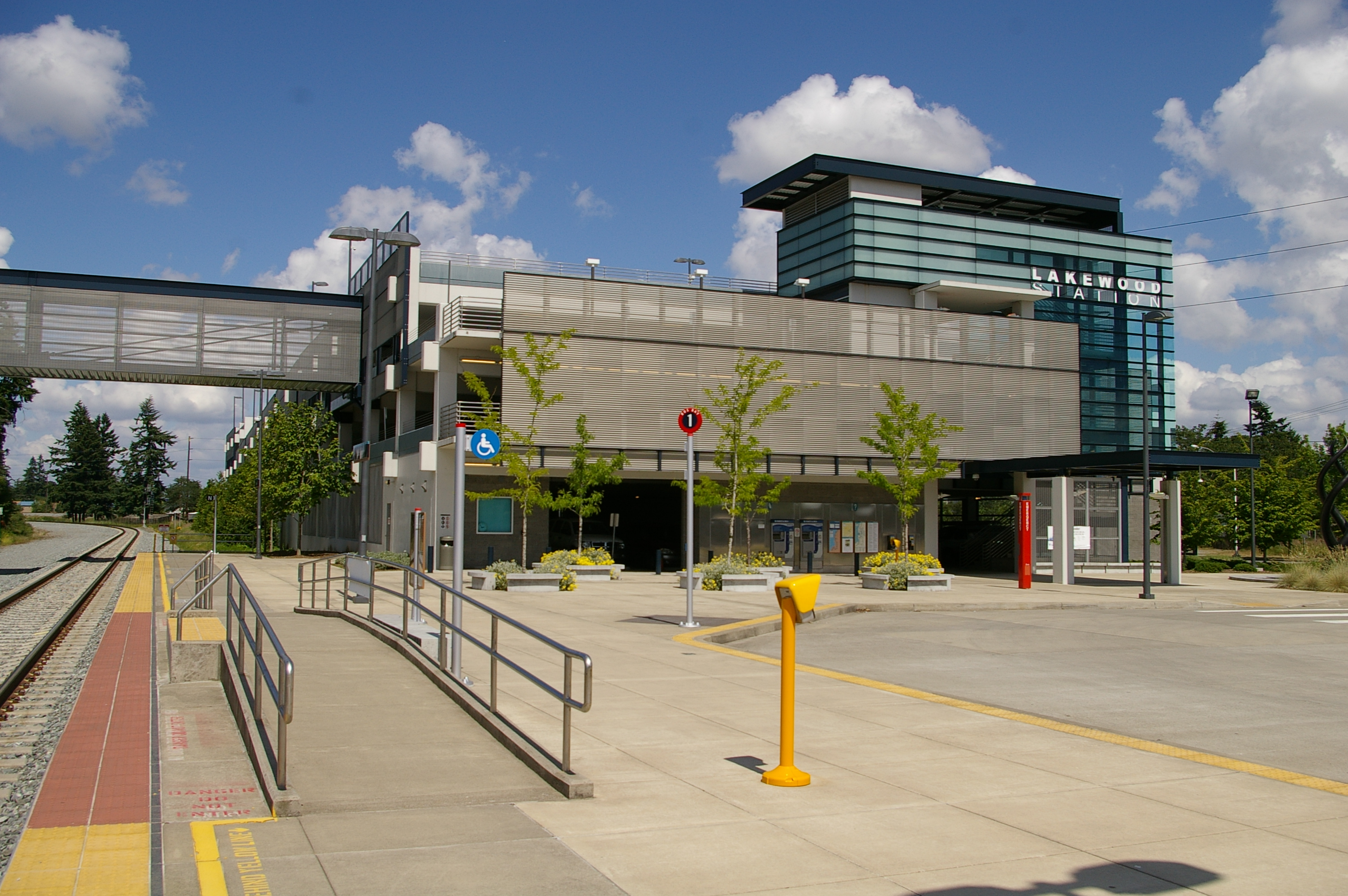
- Parking garage and train platform at Lakewood station

General information
- Location: 11424 Pacific Highway Southwest; Lakewood, Washington; United States
- Coordinates: 47°09′11″N 122°29′57″W
- Owner: Sound Transit
- Line: Sound Transit Lakeview Subdivision
- Platforms: 1 side platform
- Tracks: 2
- Connections: Intercity Transit, Sound Transit Express

Construction
- Structure type: At-grade
- Parking: 620 parking spaces
- Cycle facilities: Bicycle lockers and racks
- Accessible: yes

History
- Opened: September 21, 2008

Passengers
- 209 daily weekday boardings (2025); 53,139 total boardings (2025)

Services
Preceding station	Sound Transit	Following station
Sounder
Terminus	S Line	South Tacoma toward Seattle
Future services
Preceding station	Sound Transit	Following station
Sounder
Tillikum toward DuPont	S Line DuPont Extension 2045	South Tacoma toward Seattle
Location

Lakewood station is a commuter rail station in Lakewood, Washington, United States. It is the terminus of the S Line of the Sounder commuter rail network, operated by Sound Transit in the Seattle metropolitan area. The station, located along Pacific Highway Southwest, includes a 620-stall parking garage and several bus bays served by Intercity Transit and Sound Transit Express. Lakewood station was originally scheduled to open in 2002 as part of a Sounder extension, but plans were delayed due to funding issues and the state government's work on the Point Defiance Bypass project. Construction on the $33 million station and garage began in March 2007 and it opened for use by buses on September 18, 2008. Sounder service to Lakewood began in October 2012 and the pedestrian bridge opened a few months later.

== Description ==
Lakewood station is located along Pacific Highway near its intersection with 47th Avenue Southwest, to the east of central Lakewood. The station consists of a single side platform along the double-tracked Point Defiance Bypass, and an adjacent bus station with six bays. A four-story parking garage with 620 parking spaces is north of the bus station and includes a pedestrian bridge over the tracks to Kendrick Street Southwest, near St. Clare Hospital. The garage also has 18 covered parking spaces for bicycles.

The station was designed by Hewitt Architects and includes one piece of public art commissioned by Sound Transit, Transpire, a cast bronze sculpture by Mark Calderon that depicts a campfire with intertwined spires. The original design of the sculpture attracted controversy for being phallic in nature, which conflicted with the city's stance against prostitution and sex businesses that had historically operated along Pacific Highway.

== History ==
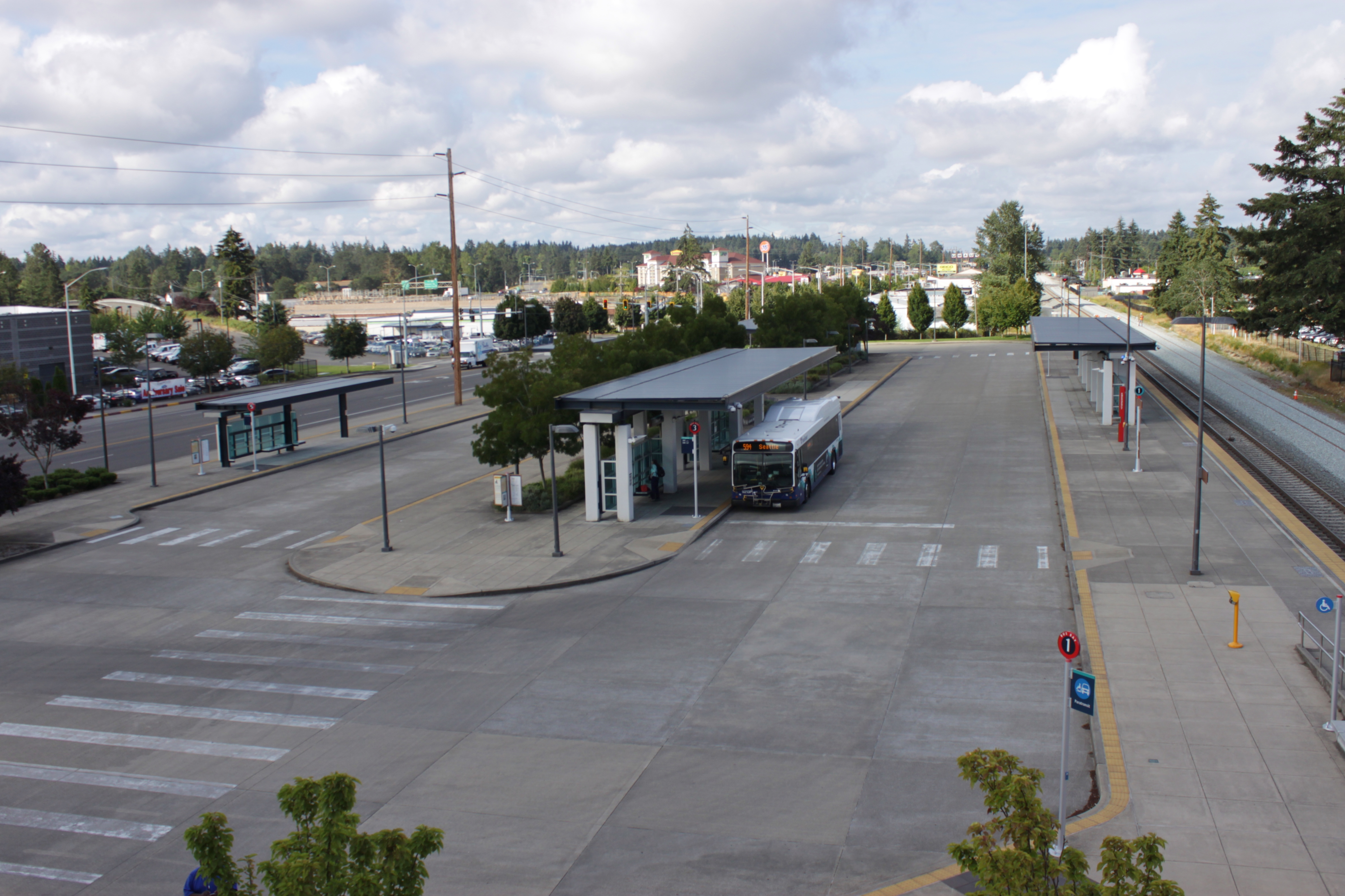
Bus bays at Lakewood station, seen from the parking garage

A commuter rail line serving Pierce County was first considered in the late 1980s by Metro Transit, but were limited to proposals that terminated in Tacoma. The regional transit plan published in 1993 initially excluded Lakewood, but a new regional transit authority (which would later become Sound Transit) added the city to its commuter rail studies in late 1993. The Lakewood–Seattle commuter rail line was included in a 1995 ballot measure, along with a feasibility study for an extension to DuPont, but it was defeated by suburban voters. The transit plan returned on the November 1996 ballot and was passed by voters, allocating $9 million in funding to the Lakewood commuter rail station.

The Lakewood segment of the commuter rail system was originally scheduled to open in 2002, shortly after the start of service from Tacoma to Seattle in 2000. Insufficient sales tax revenue, increased construction costs, design changes requested by Tacoma officials, and the state government's delays in planning the Point Defiance Bypass moved the projected opening date to 2007 and later 2012. Lakewood's city government selected a site on Pacific Highway Southwest near Bridgeport Way as its preferred location for the commuter rail station in 1998, and it was adopted by Sound Transit after the completion of an environmental assessment in 2002. Sound Transit's preferred design included a 1,000-stall surface park and ride lot, but Lakewood's concerns about pedestrian safety and impacts to potential development led to the addition of a parking garage, costing up to $7 million more.

Construction of Lakewood station's bus bays and parking garage began on March 26, 2007, under the direction of contractor PCL Construction, who were awarded the $18.8 million construction contract in February. Major construction was completed in June 2008 and the $33 million station opened for use by bus passengers on September 21, 2008. The station was initially served by Sound Transit Express routes to Tacoma and Seattle, as well as local routes operated by Pierce Transit and Intercity Transit. Construction of the Lakewood segment, which included new street crossings and signals, began in March 2010 and reached substantial completion by December; work on the Tacoma segment, which included a new overpass over Pacific Avenue near Tacoma Dome Station, was completed in March 2012 and testing along the 8-mile (13 km) extension began in August. Sounder service to Lakewood began on October 8, 2012, marking the completion of the original 82-mile (132 km) network, and was preceded by a ribbon-cutting celebration and inaugural rides to and from Tacoma Dome Station two days prior. The pedestrian bridge to Kendrick Street was completed in July 2013. As part of the state's construction of the Point Defiance Bypass, a second track was built in 2016 through Lakewood station to allow Amtrak trains to bypass Sounder trains at the platform.

The 2008 Sound Transit 2 ballot measure included approximately $54 million in funding for projects to improve access to Lakewood station, including expanded sidewalks and 5 miles (8.0 km) of new bicycle lanes. The projects are scheduled to be completed by 2030. In 2016, voters approved the Sound Transit 3 package, which included an extension of Sounder from Lakewood to Tillicum and DuPont that is scheduled to open in 2045.

== Services ==
The S Line has 13 daily round-trips between Pierce County and Seattle, of which eight terminate at Lakewood station. Late morning, early afternoon, and reverse-peak trains do not serve Lakewood, with the exception of a mid-day train added in 2016. Sounder trains travel from Lakewood to Tacoma in 21 minutes and to Seattle in 76 minutes. Lakewood station is also served by Sound Transit Express routes connecting to Puyallup station, DuPont, Tacoma, and Seattle. This includes a night bus to Downtown Seattle during hours without normal service. Intercity Transit operates buses between Tacoma and Olympia that stop at the station.
