= Sumner station =

Commuter train station in Sumner, Washington

Sumner
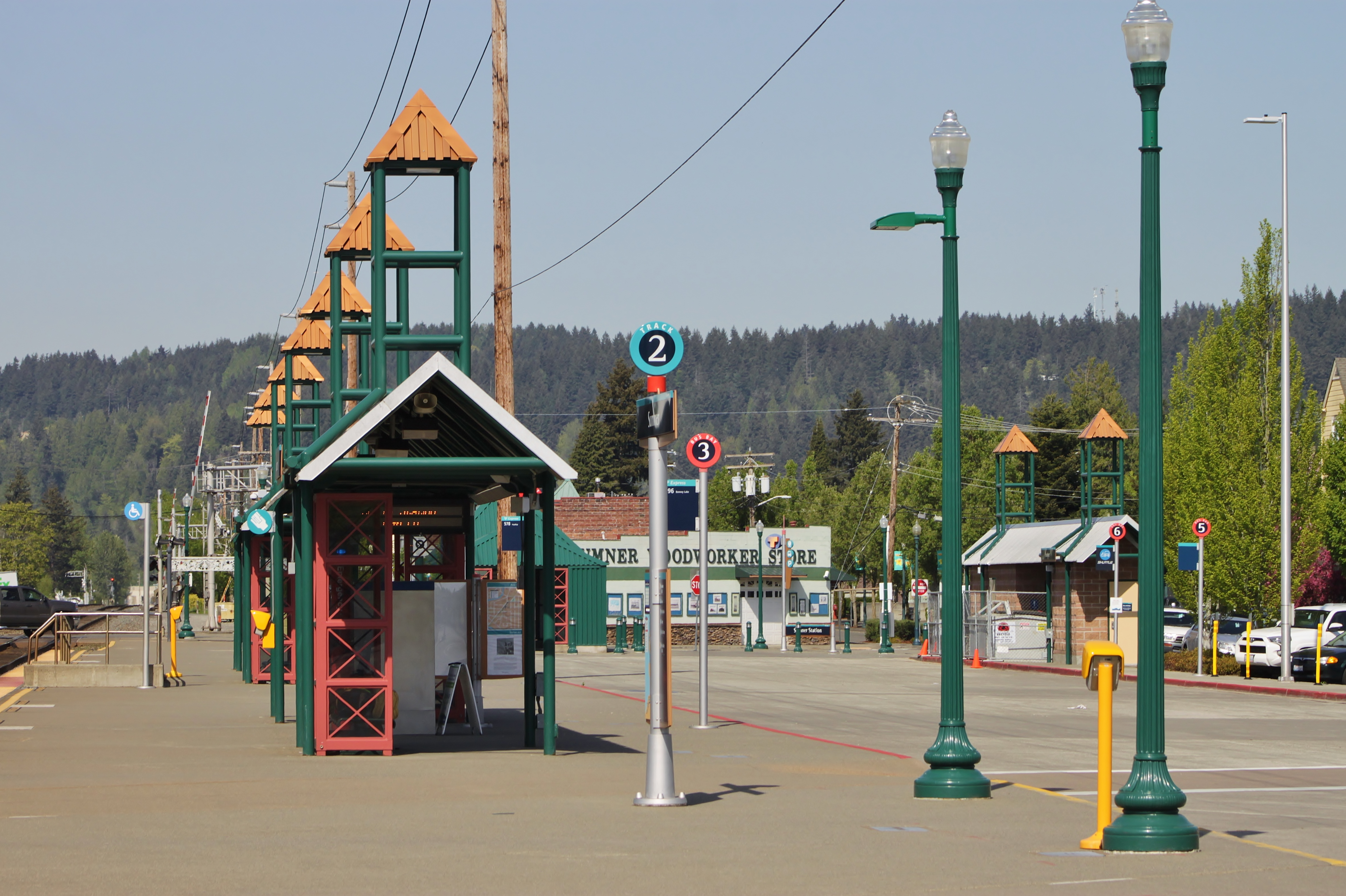
- East platform and bus bays at Sumner station

General information
- Location: 810 Maple Street; Sumner, Washington; United States
- Coordinates: 47°12′06″N 122°14′40″W
- Owner: Sound Transit
- Line: BNSF Railway Seattle Subdivision
- Platforms: 2 side platforms
- Tracks: 2
- Connections: Sound Transit Express

Construction
- Structure type: At-grade
- Parking: 302 parking spaces
- Cycle facilities: Bicycle lockers
- Accessible: Yes

History
- Opened: March 10, 2001

Passengers
- 310 daily weekday boardings (2025); 78,754 total boardings (2025)

Services
Preceding station	Sound Transit	Following station
Sounder
Puyallup toward Lakewood	S Line	Auburn toward Seattle
Location

Sumner station is a train station in the city of Sumner, Washington, United States. It is served by the S Line, a Sounder commuter rail line operated by Sound Transit. The station is located to the southwest of downtown Sumner and includes two platforms, a bus station, and 302 parking spaces. Commuter train service to Sumner began in September 2000 at a temporary station, while the permanent facility opened on March 10, 2001. Parking at the station is expected to expand to over 600 stalls in 2026, after the completion of a new parking garage and pedestrian bridge.

== Description ==
Sumner station is located southwest of downtown Sumner along Narrow and Traffic streets between Maple and Academy streets. It consists of two side platforms along a dual-track segment of the Seattle Subdivision, owned by BNSF Railway. The two platforms measure 600 feet (180 m) in length and are connected by a level crossing along Maple Street on the north side of the station. The platforms have three canopies that resemble hop kilns, reflecting Sumner's agricultural history, and act as waiting rooms for passengers. The east platform also has a clocktower, public restrooms, and several bus bays that serve Sound Transit Express buses. The north end of each platform is home to "Shadow Caster", a piece of public art by Ellen Sollod that uses a trellis-like structure with inlaid patterns to cast shadows resembling hops vines onto the sidewalk.

Sumner station has 302 parking spaces in two lots, two bicycle racks with ten spaces, and seven bicycle lockers with a capacity of 14 bicycles. The main parking lots are located on Narrow Street south of the station and between Main and Maple streets on the west side of the tracks. An overflow lot at a former Red Apple grocery store is located three blocks east of the station on Academy Street, requiring a paid reservation during weekdays. The park-and-ride serves residents of Sumner, Puyallup, Bonney Lake, and other nearby communities.

== History ==
Sumner mayor George Ryan built the city's first train station in 1883, shortly after the completion of the Puget Sound Shore Railroad, a branch of the Northern Pacific Railway between Tacoma and Seattle. Sumner's train depot, located near the site of the current Sounder station, was replaced several times and demolished in 1976.

Proposals for a modern commuter rail system between Seattle and Tacoma date back to the 1980s and included a potential stop in Sumner using either the Burlington Northern (later BNSF) or Union Pacific railroads. The 1993 regional transit plan developed by the Regional Transit Authority (RTA; later Sound Transit) recommended a commuter rail station in Sumner, which carried over into the RTA's failed 1995 ballot measure. During development of the 1995 plan, a joint Puyallup–Sumner station with a large park-and-ride facility was proposed and later rejected in favor of separate downtown stations. The commuter rail system was approved by voters in 1996 and the project moved into engineering and design under Sound Transit.

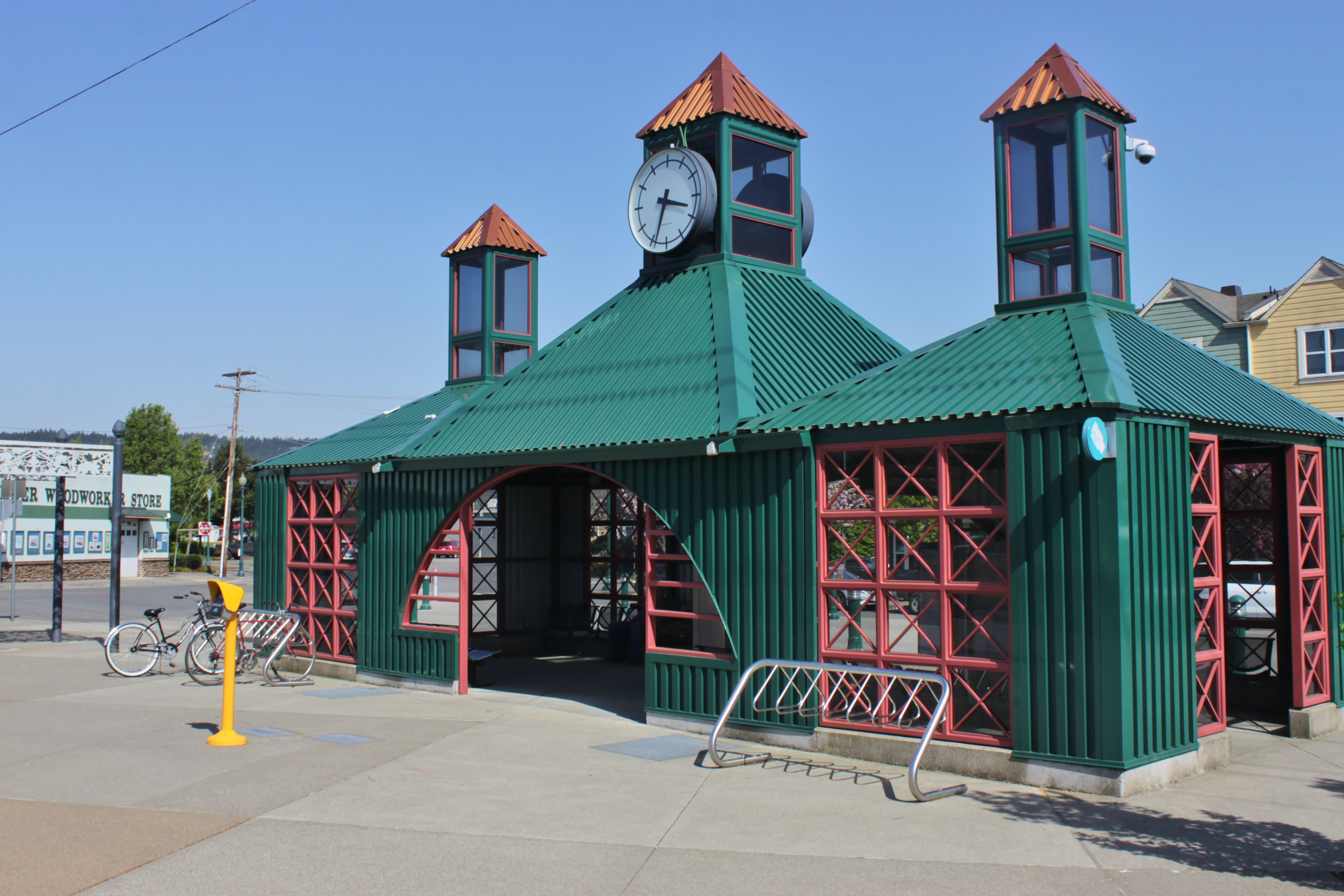
The passenger waiting shelter at Sumner station, shaped like a hop kiln

A block-long section of Narrow Street south of Maple Street, home to the city's maintenance shops, was proposed as the site for the commuter rail station in 1997. The Narrow Street site was formally adopted as the preferred alternative in early 1998 and a contract to design the station was awarded to Tacoma-based architecture firm Merritt Pardini. The station's depot, reflecting the area's historical hops industry, was originally slated to be scaled back due to rising project costs, but protests from Sumner residents prompted Sound Transit to fund its construction separately. Design work on the station was completed in July 1999 and the $3.9 million construction contract was awarded to Lumpkin General Contractor in September.

Construction of Sumner station began on October 5, 1999, with a ceremonial groundbreaking attended by local officials and community members. The city's maintenance shops and recycling center were moved to new facilities to make way for the station's park and ride lots. The platforms were graded in July 2000 and a temporary station opened for Sounder service on September 18, 2000. Sumner station officially opened on March 10, 2001, coinciding with the introduction of Sound Transit Express routes to the city.

=== Parking expansion ===
Parking demands at the station spurred the creation of a restricted parking zone on nearby streets, as the park and ride lot filled quickly in the mornings by 2006. In its 2005 long-range plan, Sound Transit considered two proposals to alleviate demand at the station: construction of a parking garage at the current station, or construction of an auxiliary station on city-owned land to the north of downtown Sumner. The parking garage was favored by the Sumner city council, but councilmembers disagreed on whether to site it adjacent to the station or elsewhere in Sumner or Bonney Lake. The garage project and a provisional station in North Sumner (reliant on third party funding) were included in the Roads and Transit ballot measure in 2007, which combined transit projects with road improvements. The ballot measure was rejected by voters and a revised, transit-only plan known as Sound Transit 2 was passed the following year. Sound Transit 2 dropped the provisional North Sumner station and allocated $40 million to the garage project.

The 400-stall parking garage on the south side of the station was approved in 2014 alongside improvements to nearby sidewalks and a pedestrian overpass connecting the two platforms. The garage's four-story height and its effects on Sumner's historic downtown generated concerns from the city council, who also requested 623 parking stalls (a net increase of 505 stalls) before endorsing the project in 2016. The 602-stall garage and pedestrian overpass were scheduled to begin construction in 2019 and open by 2021, at a cost of $52 million, but will be delayed due to the COVID-19 pandemic. Construction of the garage began with a groundbreaking ceremony on August 6, 2024, and is planned to cost $49 million. It is planned to be completed in early 2026, while the pedestrian bridge is deferred. During construction, approximately 190 stalls will be closed and a city-run shuttle service is planned to run to offset the loss of parking capacity.

== Services ==
Sumner station is served by 13 daily round-trips on the Sounder S Line, which travel north to King Street Station in Downtown Seattle and south to Tacoma Dome Station or Lakewood station on weekdays. Two Sound Transit Express bus routes also stop at the station: Route 578, with all-day connections to Puyallup station, Auburn station, Federal Way Transit Center, and Downtown Seattle; and Route 596, a peak-only shuttle to Bonney Lake's park and ride. The station was served by local Pierce Transit service until Sumner withdrew from the district in 2012, in part due to declining service. Pierce County operates a separate dial-a-ride service between Sumner station, downtown Sumner, and Bonney Lake on weekdays. In 2022, the Sumner city government contracted BusUp to provide shuttle service between the station and industrial businesses; the service began in January 2023.
