= Bonney Lake, Washington =

- City
- Location of Bonney Lake, Washington
- Coordinates: 47°10′18″N 122°09′52″W
- Country: United States
- State: Washington
- County: Pierce
- Incorporated (town): February 28, 1949
- Founder: Kenneth Simmons

Government
  - Type: Mayor–council
  - Mayor: Terry Carter

Area
  - Total: 8.29 sq mi (21.46 km^{2})
  - Land: 8.22 sq mi (21.28 km^{2})
  - Water: 0.066 sq mi (0.17 km^{2})
- Elevation: 591 ft (180 m)

Population (2020)
  - Total: 22,487
  - Estimate (2024): 22,145
  - Density: 2,573.3/sq mi (993.57/km^{2})
- Time zone: UTC-8 (PST)
  - Summer (DST): UTC-7 (PDT)
- ZIP code: 98391
- Area code: 253
- FIPS code: 53-07170
- GNIS feature ID: 2409880
- Website: www.bonneylake.gov

Bonney Lake is a city in Pierce County, Washington named for William P. Bonney. The population was 22,487 at the time of the 2020 census.

== History ==
Bonney Lake was named after William P. Bonney due to his contributions to preserving the history of settlers' in the area.

Bonney Lake was incorporated as a town on February 28, 1949, after the establishment of a co-op venture to bring electricity and tap water service to local residents. Several unsuccessful attempts were made to disincorporate the town from 1952 to 1972.

The City of Bonney Lake and the Greater Bonney Lake Historical Society placed in 13 historical markers between 2009 and 2015, including one for the Naches Trail, which was a well-used immigrant and military trail during the later half of the 1800s.

The 2020 Washington Labor Day fires forced the evacuation of an estimated 2,500 residences. The fire spread across 500 acres, and the evacuation lasted from Tuesday, September 8 until the following Sunday, September 13.

== Geography ==
According to the United States Census Bureau, the city has a total area of 8.01 square miles (20.75 km^{2}), of which, 7.94 square miles (20.56 km^{2}) is land and 0.07 square miles (0.18 km^{2}) is water.

== Demographics ==
Historical population
Census	Pop.	Note	%±
1950	275		—
1960	645		134.5%
1970	2,700		318.6%
1980	5,328		97.3%
1990	7,494		40.7%
2000	9,687		29.3%
2010	17,374		79.4%
2020	22,487		29.4%
2024 (est.)	22,145		−1.5%
U.S. Decennial Census; 2020 Census

=== 2020 census ===
As of the 2020 census, Bonney Lake had a population of 22,487. The median age was 36.8 years. 26.5% of residents were under the age of 18 and 10.5% of residents were 65 years of age or older. For every 100 females there were 99.2 males, and for every 100 females age 18 and over there were 99.9 males age 18 and over.

99.9% of residents lived in urban areas, while 0.1% lived in rural areas.

There were 7,364 households in Bonney Lake, of which 42.7% had children under the age of 18 living in them. Of all households, 60.9% were married-couple households, 14.4% were households with a male householder and no spouse or partner present, and 15.9% were households with a female householder and no spouse or partner present. About 14.6% of all households were made up of individuals and 5.0% had someone living alone who was 65 years of age or older.

There were 7,605 housing units, of which 3.2% were vacant. The homeowner vacancy rate was 1.0% and the rental vacancy rate was 2.9%.

Racial composition as of the 2020 census
Race	Number	Percent
White	17,362	77.2%
Black or African American	480	2.1%
American Indian and Alaska Native	310	1.4%
Asian	761	3.4%
Native Hawaiian and Other Pacific Islander	153	0.7%
Some other race	670	3.0%
Two or more races	2,751	12.2%
Hispanic or Latino (of any race)	1,991	8.9%

=== 2010 census ===
As of the 2010 census, there were 17,374 people living in Bonney Lake. There were 5,989 households and 4,632 families living in the city. The population density was 2,188.2 inhabitants per square mile (844.9/km^{2}). There were 6,394 housing units at an average density of 805.3 per square mile (310.9/km^{2}). The racial makeup of the city was 88.6% White, 1.1% African American, .8% Native American, 2.4% Asian, 0.5% Pacific Islander, 1.8% from other races, and 4.5% from two or more races. Hispanic or Latino of any race were 6.1% of the population.

There were 5,989 households, of which 44.5% had children under the age of 18 living with them, 61.0% were married couples living together, 10.1% had a female householder with no husband present, 6.3% had a male householder with no wife present, and 22.7% were non-families. 15.4% of all households were made up of individuals, and 4.1% had someone living alone who was 65 years of age or older. The average household size was 2.89 and the average family size was 3.20.

The median age in the city was 34.6 years. 27.2% of residents were under the age of 18; 7.8% were between the ages of 18 and 24; 30.8% were from 25 to 44; 26.5% were from 45 to 64; and 8.2% were 65 years of age or older. The gender makeup of the city was 49.4% male and 50.6% female.

=== 2000 census ===
As of the 2000 census, there were 9,687 people, 3,266 households, and 2,583 families living in the city. The population density was 1,780.9 people per square mile (687.5/km^{2}). There were 3,404 housing units at an average density of 625.8 per square mile (241.6/km^{2}). The racial makeup of the city was 94.08% White, 0.60% African American, 1.02% Native American, 1.27% Asian, 0.07% Pacific Islander, 0.62% from other races, and 2.33% from two or more races. Hispanic or Latino of any race were 3.08% of the population.

There were 3,266 households, out of which 47.3% had children under the age of 18 living with them, 63.7% were married couples living together, 9.2% had a female householder with no husband present, and 20.9% were non-families. 13.6% of all households were made up of individuals, and 2.4% had someone living alone who was 65 years of age or older. The average household size was 2.96 and the average family size was 3.26.

In the city, the population was spread out, with 32.0% under the age of 18, 7.3% from 18 to 24, 35.7% from 25 to 44, 20.3% from 45 to 64, and 4.6% who were 65 years of age or older. The median age was 33 years. For every 100 females, there were 106.5 males. For every 100 females age 18 and over, there were 107.0 males.

The median income for a household in the city was $60,282, and the median income for a family was $62,644. Males had a median income of $46,813 versus $31,837 for females. The per capita income for the city was $21,371. About 3.0% of families and 4.0% of the population were below the poverty line, including 3.8% of those under age 18 and 5.3% of those age 65 or over.

== Culture ==
The Bonney Lake Historical Society formed in 2001 and operates a small museum and archive in the former city hall near Allan Yorke Park. It has 5,500 cataloged items.

== Transportation ==
Bonney Lake is bisected by State Route 410, which has connections to the rest of the Seattle metropolitan area as well as the northeast side of Mount Rainier. Public transportation service within the city was provided by Pierce Transit until 2012, when Bonney Lake left the transit agency's public transportation benefit area. The city's local bus service had been cut due to earlier funding shortages and the failure of a countywide sales tax measure to fund operations. A peak-only route that connects to Sumner station, with onward Sounder commuter rail service to Seattle, was discontinued by Pierce Transit in June 2012 and transferred to Sound Transit. Bonney Lake continued to be within the Sound Transit district boundaries; its Pierce Transit-owned park-and-ride lot was acquired by Sound Transit in 2014.

== Notable people ==
- Jordin Andrade, Olympic track and field athlete who competed at the 2016 Summer Olympics
- Dylan Gambrell, NHL player for the Ottawa Senators
- Megan Jendrick, Olympic swimming gold medalist
- Dallas Jenkins, film and television director
- Melanie Roach, Olympic weightlifter
- Kyle J. White, Medal of Honor recipient
