= Sound Transit Express =

Express bus system in Seattle, Washington

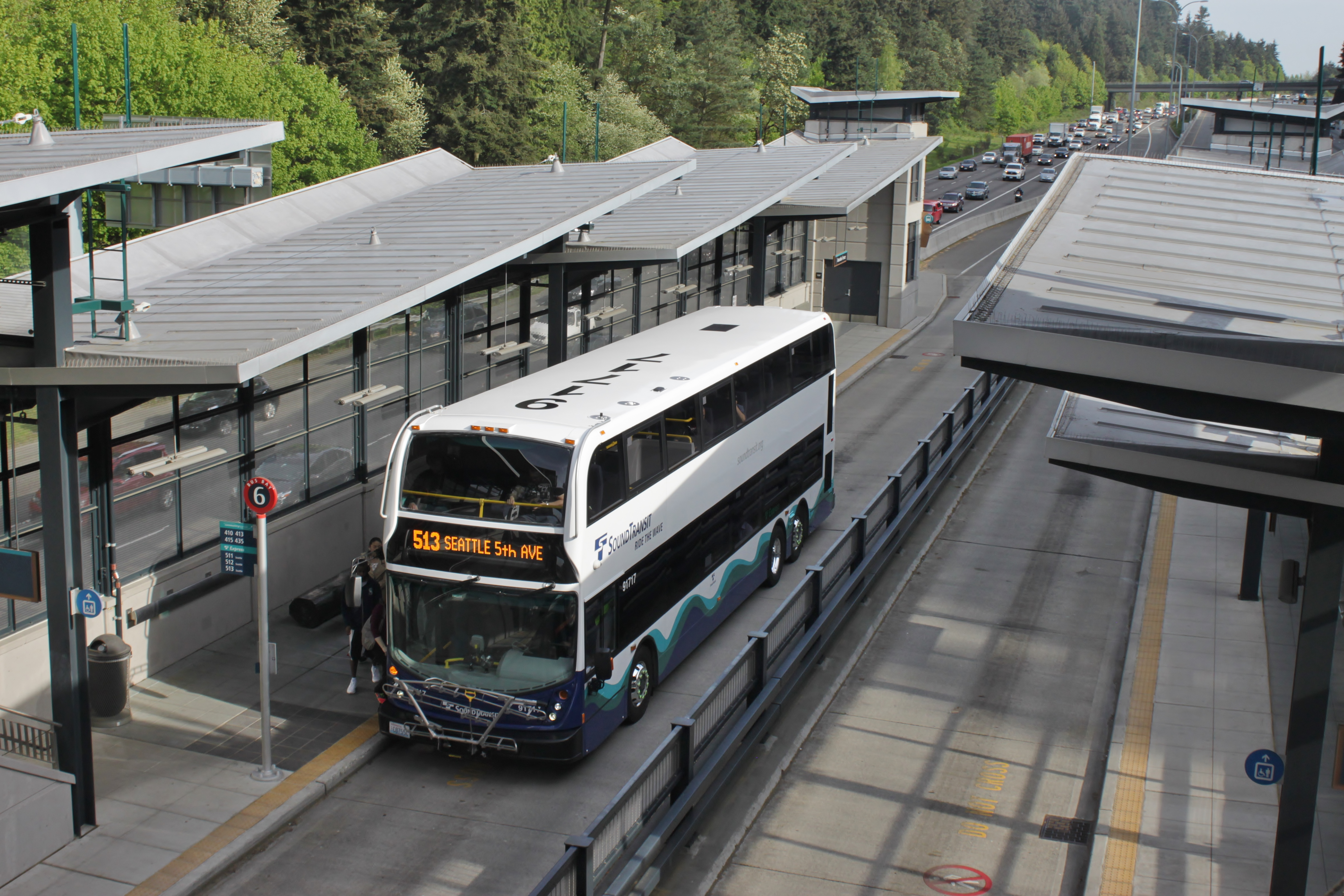
- A double-decker Sound Transit Express bus on Route 513 at Mountlake Terrace Freeway Station
- Parent: Sound Transit
- Founded: 1996
- Headquarters: Seattle, Washington
- Locale: Puget Sound region
- Service area: King, Pierce, and Snohomish
- Service type: Express bus service
- Routes: 25
- Hubs: 8
- Fleet: 240 buses (details)
- Daily ridership: 25,600 (weekdays, Q2 2026)
- Annual ridership: 9,809,600 (2025)
- Fuel type: CNG, Diesel, and Diesel-electric hybrid
- Operator: Community Transit, King County Metro, and Pierce Transit
- Website: www.soundtransit.org

Sound Transit Express (ST Express) is a network of regional express buses operated by the multi-county transit agency Sound Transit. The routes connect major regional hubs throughout 53 cities in three counties (King, Pierce, and Snohomish) in the Puget Sound region. Sound Transit Express ranks first in the nation in the number of commuter bus passengers carried and in vehicle miles driven. The first nine routes and 114 buses began carrying passengers on September 19, 1999. In 2025, the system had a ridership of 9,809,600, or about 25,600 per weekday as of the second quarter of 2026.

Unlike a typical transit bus service, Sound Transit Express routes typically make limited stops as they travel longer distances on the freeways. Most routes operate seven days a week, with runs throughout the day. Where available, buses use transit-only lanes, high-occupancy vehicle lanes, high-occupancy toll lanes, express lanes, bus bypass shoulders, and direct access ramps to speed travel times. The enabling legislation for Sound Transit requires the eventual replacement of interim express bus routes with forms of high-capacity transit, including Link light rail and bus rapid transit. As a result, many routes have been truncated or discontinued to accommodate expansions of the regional transit system.

While Sound Transit oversees, plans, and funds the service, operation and maintenance of the buses is contracted out to Community Transit, King County Metro and Pierce Transit. There are 240 buses in the system's fleet.

== Fares ==
ST Express uses a flat fare system, where each ride costs the same regardless of distance.

The fares are as follows:

Fare type	All
Adult	$3.00
Senior (65+) / Disabled / Medicare (Regional Reduced Fare Permit required)	$1.00
Low-income (ORCA LIFT card required)	$1.00
Youth (6–18 years)	Free
Children (0–5 years, with fare paying passenger)	Free

Paper transfers are not accepted or issued on Sound Transit routes. Passengers who use ORCA may transfer between ST routes or routes operated by most other agencies within two hours of initial payment. If the fare for the second route is higher, the difference will be charged.

Sound Transit reduced the base fare to match the Link light rail's flat $3 fare in March 2025.

== Routes ==
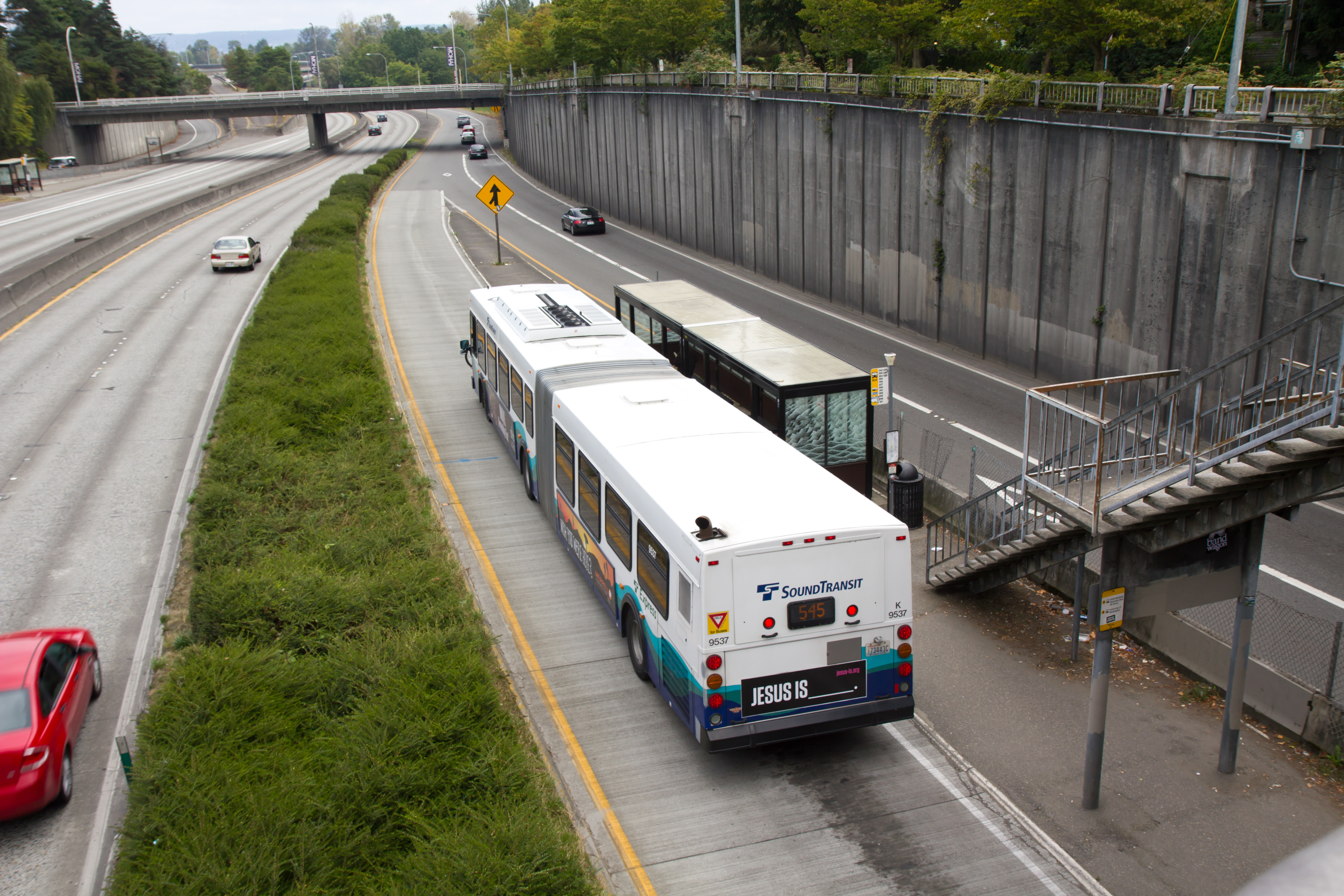
Sound Transit Express route 545 serving the Montlake Freeway Station

21 Sound Transit Express bus routes are overseen by the agency. Buses are operated under contract by King County Metro, Pierce Transit and Community Transit. When Sound Transit implements a new bus route, changes are frequently made to existing routes that serve the area to avoid overlapping.

The ST Express routes and operators as of August 2026 are:

Route	Off-peak service	Weekend service	Start	Via	End	Operator
510	No (use route 512)	No (use route 512)	Downtown Seattle	I-5, South Everett Freeway Station, Mountlake Terrace Freeway Station	Everett Station Downtown Everett (select trips only)	Community Transit
512	Yes	Yes	Lynnwood City Center Station	Ash Way Park & Ride, South Everett Freeway Station	Everett Station Downtown Everett (select trips only)	Community Transit
513	No	No	Lynnwood City Center Station	Ash Way Park & Ride	Seaway Transit Center	Community Transit
522	Yes	Yes	Shoreline South/148th Station	145th Street, Lake City Way, Bothell Way NE, Ballinger Way, Kenmore Park & Ride	University of Washington, Bothell/Cascadia College Woodinville Park & Ride (select trips only)	King County Metro
532	No (use routes 535 & 512)	No	Downtown Bellevue	Bellevue Transit Center, Totem Lake Freeway Station, Canyon Park Park & Ride, Ash Way Park & Ride, South Everett Freeway Station	Everett Station	Community Transit
535	Yes	Yes	Downtown Bellevue	Bellevue Transit Center, Totem Lake Freeway Station, Brickyard Freeway Station, Bothell Park & Ride, University of Washington, Bothell/Cascadia College, Canyon Park Park & Ride, Alderwood Mall	Lynnwood Transit Center	Community Transit
542	Yes	Yes	U District Station	University of Washington, University of Washington Station, Evergreen Point Freeway Station, Yarrow Point Freeway Station, Overlake Transit Center, SR 520 & NE 51st Freeway Station, Downtown Redmond	Redmond Transit Center	King County Metro
545	Yes	Yes	Downtown Seattle	Capitol Hill (select trips), Montlake Freeway Station (closed since 2019), Evergreen Point Freeway Station, Yarrow Point Freeway Station, Overlake Transit Center, SR 520 & NE 51st Freeway Station, Downtown Redmond, Redmond Transit Center	Bear Creek Park & Ride	King County Metro
547 (night route)	Yes (night only)	Yes (night only)	Downtown Seattle	Mercer Island Station, South Bellevue Station, Bellevue Transit Center, Spring District Station, Redmond Technology Station, Downtown Redmond Station	Marymoor Village Station	King County Metro
556	Yes	Yes	Downtown Bellevue	Bellevue Transit Center, South Bellevue Park & Ride, Eastgate Freeway Station, Issaquah Transit Center	Issaquah Highlands Park & Ride	King County Metro
560	Yes	Yes	Bellevue Transit Center	Newport Hills Park & Ride, Kennydale Freeway Station, Renton, Renton Transit Center, Sea-Tac Airport, SeaTac/Airport Station, Burien Transit Center	Westwood Village	Pierce Transit
566	Yes	No	Redmond Technology Station (select trips) State Route 520 & NE 40th St (select trips)	Bellevue Transit Center, Renton, Renton Transit Center, Kent Station (select trips), Auburn Park & Ride (select trips)	Kent Station (select trips) Auburn Transit Center	King County Metro
574	Yes	Yes	Federal Way Downtown Station	Tacoma Dome Station, SR 512 Park & Ride	Lakewood Transit Center	Pierce Transit
577	Yes	Yes	Downtown Seattle	I-5	Federal Way Transit Center	Pierce Transit
578	Yes	Yes	Downtown Seattle	Federal Way Transit Center, Auburn Station, Sumner Station	Puyallup Station	Pierce Transit
590	No (use route 594)	No (use route 594)	Downtown Seattle	SODO Busway, Tacoma Dome Station	Tacoma Dome Station (Select trips only) Downtown Tacoma	Pierce Transit
592	No	No	Downtown Seattle	SR 512 Park & Ride, Lakewood Station	DuPont Station	Pierce Transit
594	Yes	Yes	Downtown Seattle	SODO Busway, Tacoma Dome Station, University of Washington Tacoma, Downtown Tacoma, SR 512 Park & Ride	Lakewood Station DuPont Station (select trips only)	Pierce Transit
595	No	No	Downtown Seattle	SODO Busway, Tacoma Community College Transit Center, Narrows Park & Ride, Kimball Drive Park & Ride	Gig Harbor (Purdy Park & Ride)	Pierce Transit
596	No	No	Sumner Station	SR 410	Bonney Lake Park & Ride	Pierce Transit
597 (night route)	Yes (night only)	Yes (night only)	Downtown Seattle	Tukwila International Boulevard Station, SeaTac/Airport Station, Federal Way Downtown Station, Tacoma Dome Station	Lakewood Station	Pierce Transit

== Fleet ==
Sound Transit owns a fleet of 240 buses operated by three different local transit agencies: Community Transit, King County Metro, and Pierce Transit. These buses are maintained at the respective bases for the agencies in Everett, Bellevue, and Lakewood. The fleet includes articulated, double-decker, and high-floor coach buses. Sound Transit buses are painted white with aqua, turquoise, and blue waves along the sides, representing the Puget Sound region ST Express serves, and most feature a freely-adapted representation of the Sound Transit bus and train system map on the seating fabric.

Occasionally, vehicles that are not in Sound Transit livery are used on Sound Transit routes by the operating agencies. Also, Sound Transit vehicles may also be used by the local agencies for other commuter routes.

Sound Transit Express buses

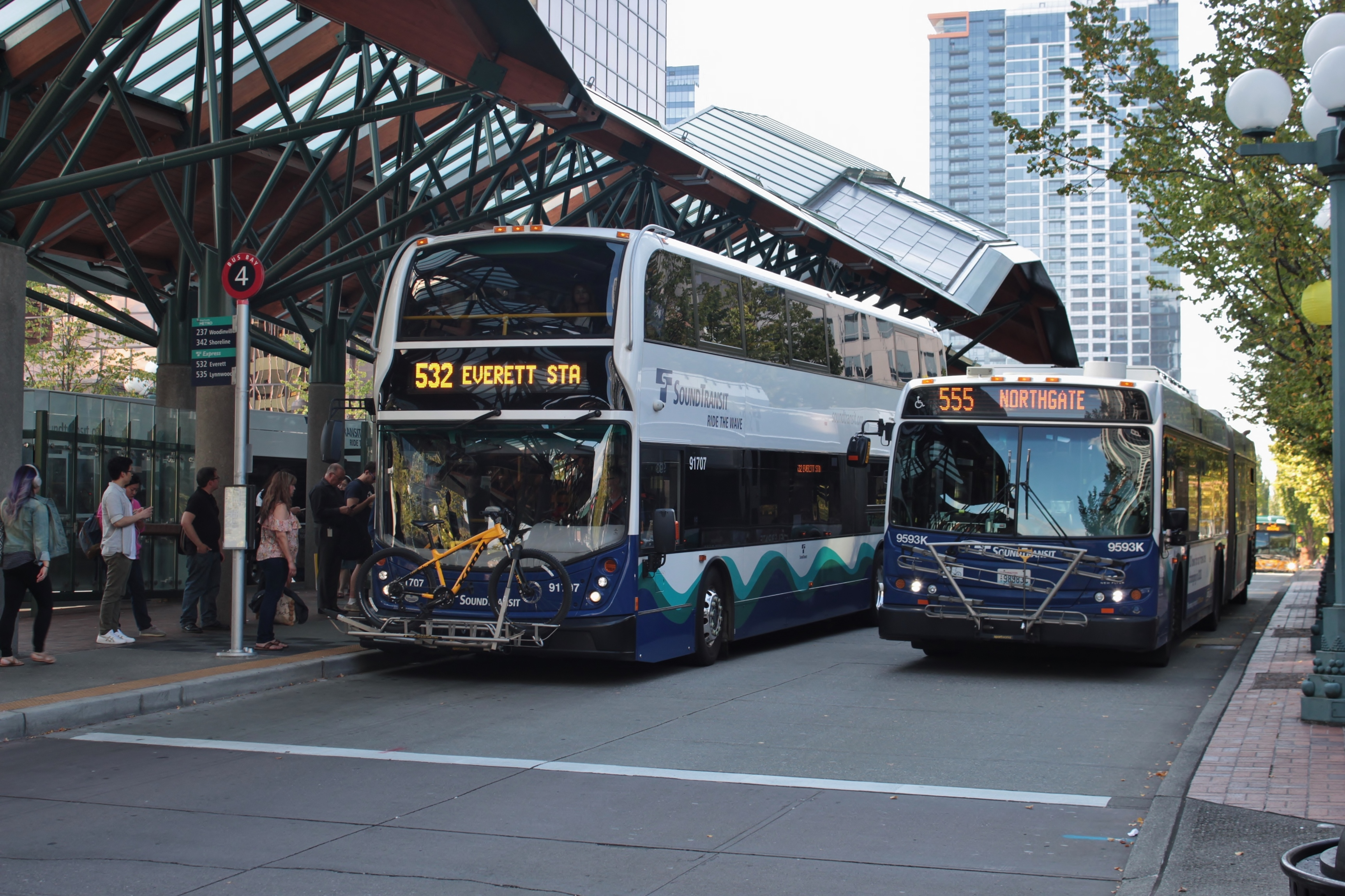
Double-decker and articulated buses at Bellevue Transit Center

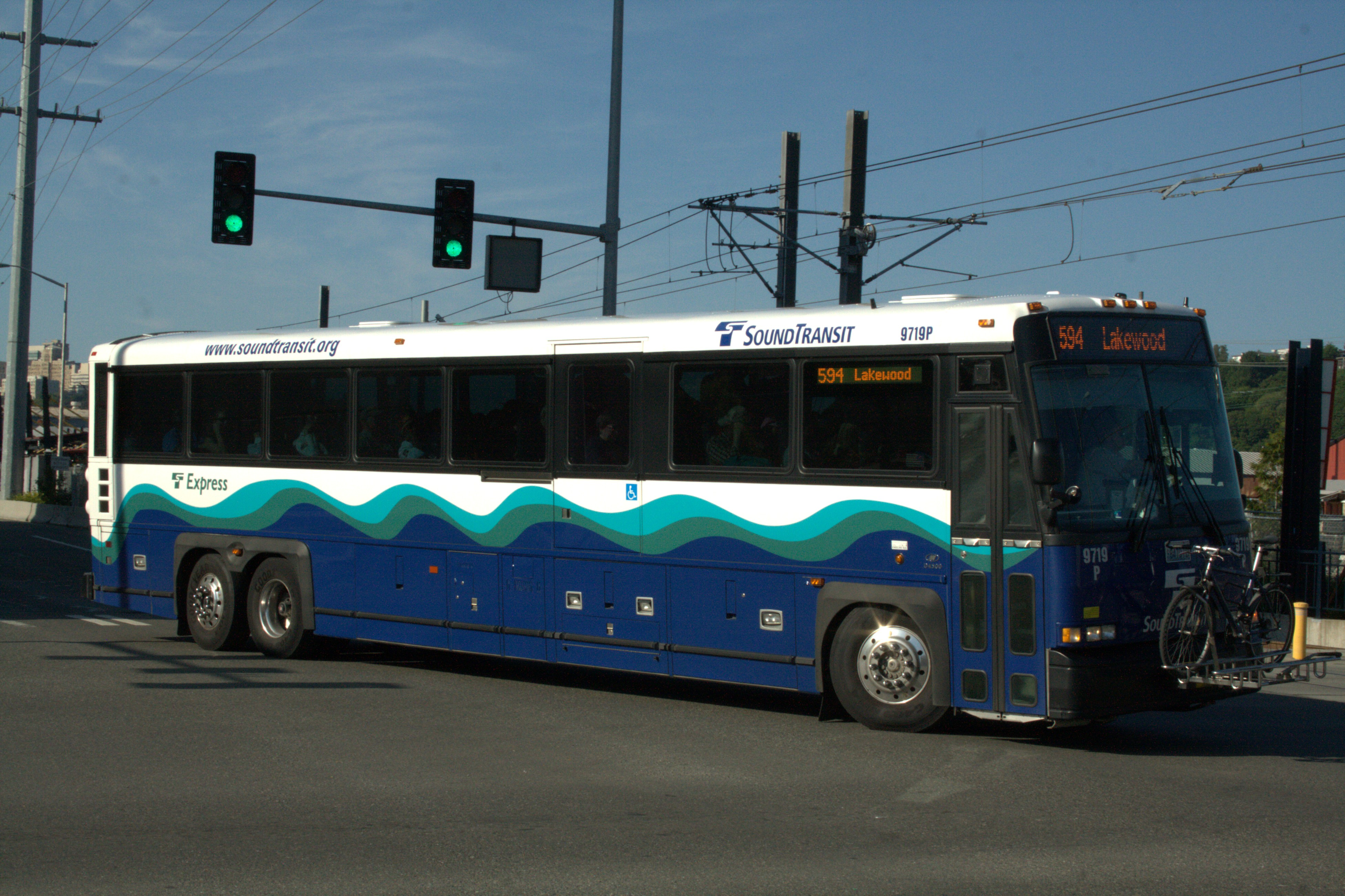
Coach bus on route 594 in SoDo

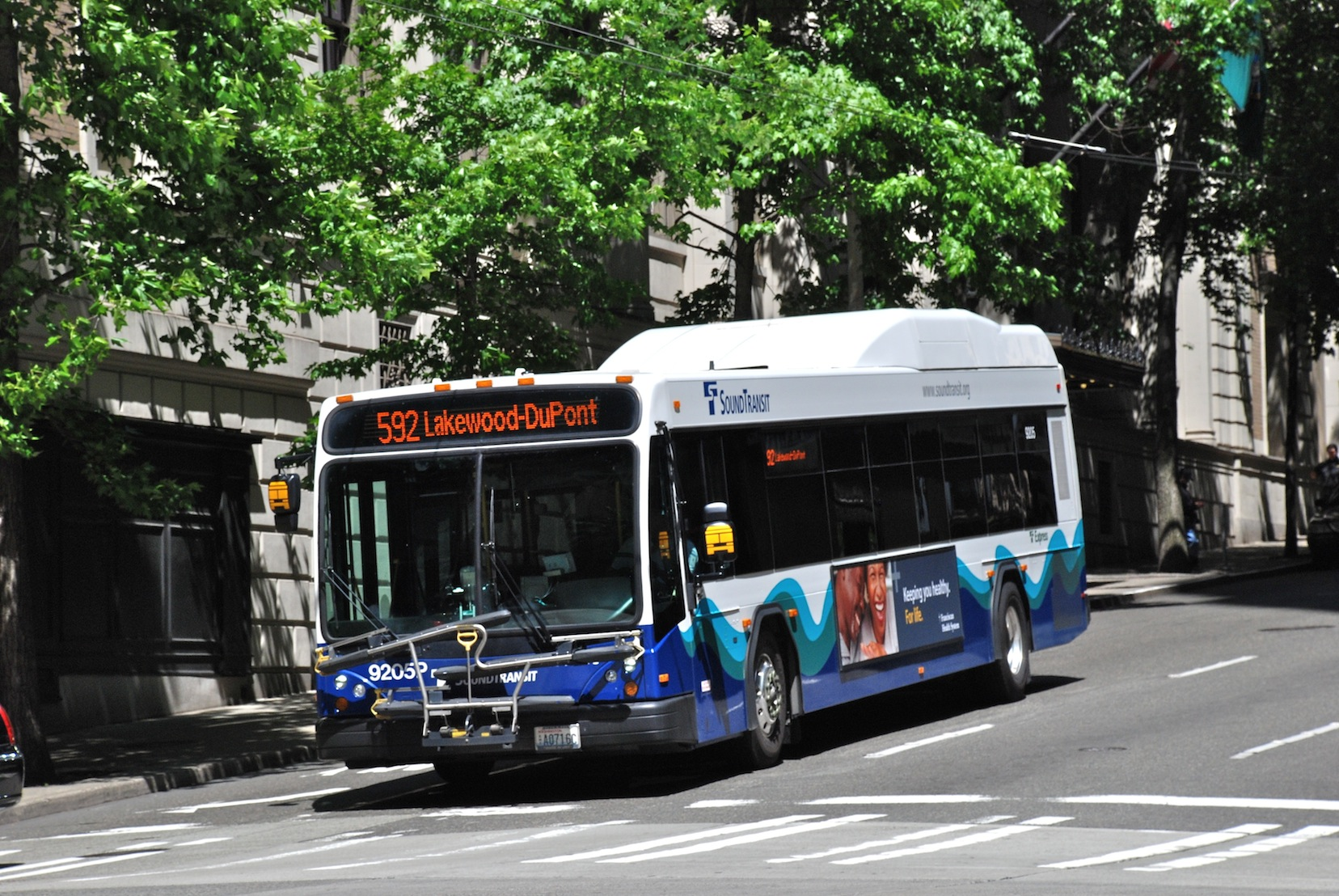
Bus on route 592 in Downtown Seattle

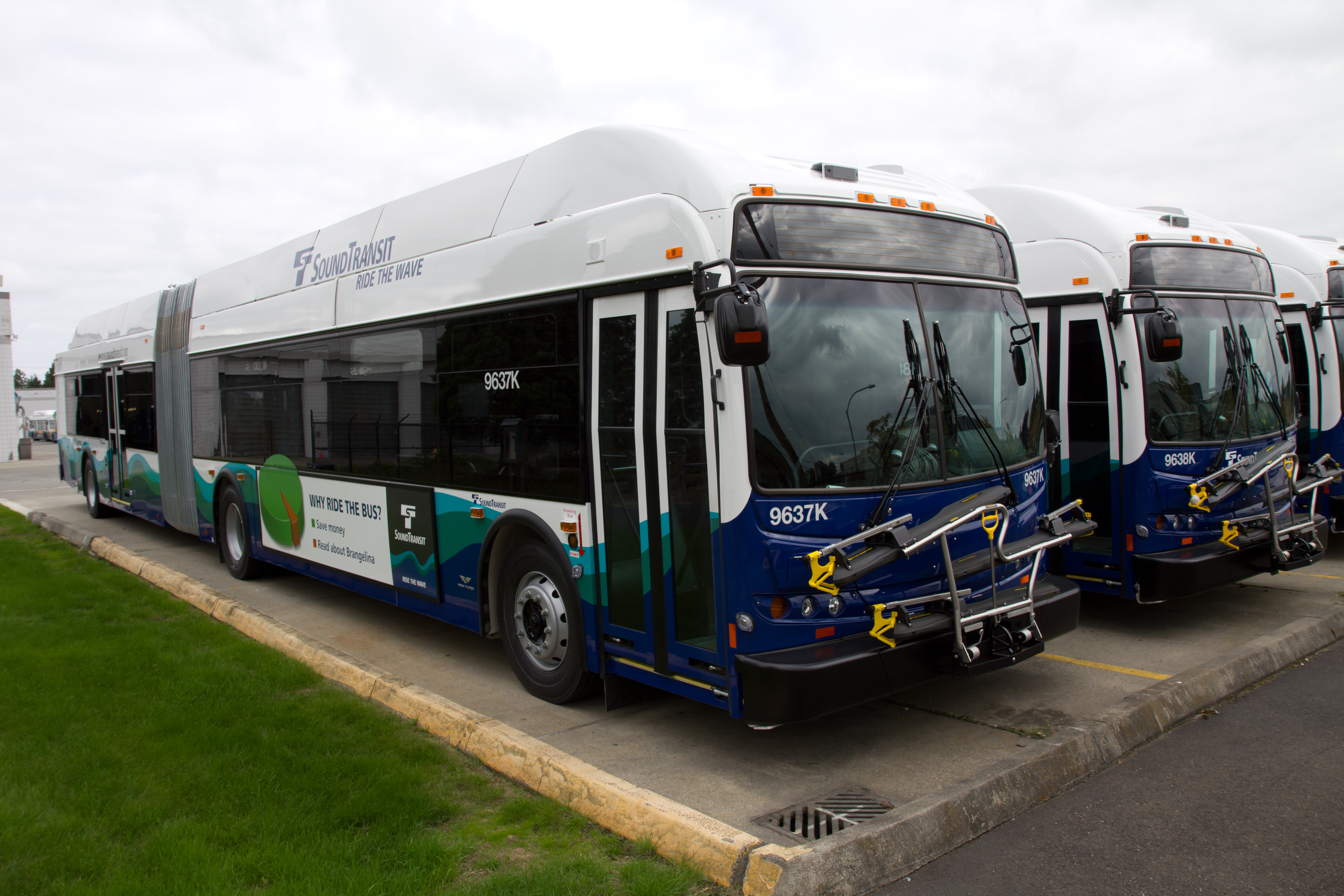
Articulated bus at the Pierce Transit base in Lakewood
