= Auburn station (Sound Transit) =

Commuter train station in Auburn, Washington

Auburn
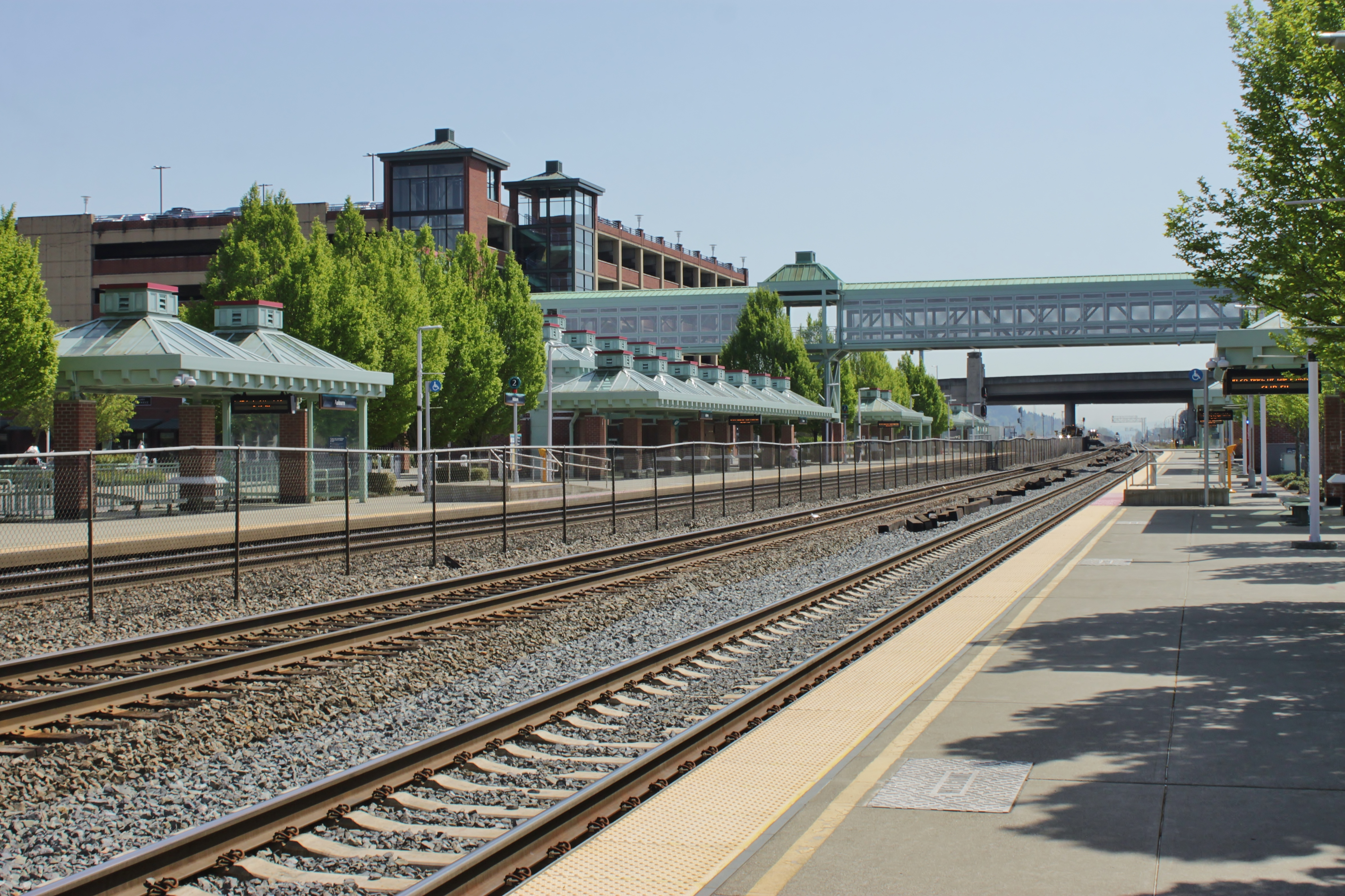
- The station's parking garage and bridge from the west platform

General information
- Location: 23 A Street Southwest; Auburn, Washington; United States
- Coordinates: 47°18′24″N 122°13′56″W
- Owner: Sound Transit
- Line: BNSF Railway Seattle Subdivision
- Platforms: 2 side platforms
- Tracks: 3
- Connections: King County Metro, Sound Transit Express, Pierce Transit

Construction
- Structure type: At-grade
- Parking: 633 parking spaces
- Cycle facilities: Bicycle lockers
- Accessible: Yes

History
- Opened: September 17, 2000

Passengers
- 382 daily weekday boardings (2025); 96,995 total boardings (2025)

Services
Preceding station	Sound Transit	Following station
Sounder
Sumner toward Lakewood	S Line	Kent toward Seattle
Former services
Preceding station	Great Northern Railway	Following station
Sumner toward Portland	Portland–Seattle Line	Kent toward Seattle
Preceding station	Northern Pacific Railway	Following station
Kent toward Seattle	Main Line	East Auburn toward St. Paul
Sumner toward Tacoma	Main Line	East Auburn toward St. Paul
Dieringer toward Portland	Portland–Seattle Line	Kent toward Seattle
Preceding station	Amtrak	Following station
At East Auburn (pre-1981)
Seattle Terminus	Empire Builder	Ellensburg toward Chicago
Location

Auburn station is a train station in the city of Auburn, Washington, United States, served by S Line of the Sounder commuter rail network. It is located southwest of downtown Auburn and consists of two train platforms, a bus station, a parking garage, a public plaza, and a pedestrian bridge. The station has 633 parking spaces and is also served by Sound Transit Express, King County Metro, and Pierce Transit buses. Auburn station opened in 2000 and was built on the site of a former railroad station that was demolished in 1979. The parking garage and pedestrian bridge opened in 2003, and a second parking garage is planned to be built by 2027.

== Description ==
Auburn station is located at the intersection of Main Street and B Street in the southwestern part of downtown Auburn. The station's two side platforms run north–south along a triple-track segment of the BNSF Railway's Seattle Subdivision and are connected by an at-grade crossing on Main Street. Adjacent to the east platform are several bus bays and a public plaza, which includes seating areas, a clock tower, and public art. The station's canopies and clock tower were designed to match buildings on Auburn's Main Street using brick pillars, painted steel canopies, and glass rooftops. Since 2009, the plaza has also served as the venue for the city's farmers' market, which runs seasonally from June to September.

The station has 633 parking spaces, including a parking garage with 520 spaces that is shared with the City of Auburn, and 113 surface stalls on the west side of the station. The six-story parking garage, located east of the platform and bus bays, also includes retail spaces and a pedestrian bridge that connects the two Sounder platforms. The station also has a drop-off area for 37 vehicles, 32 bicycle rack spaces, and 26 bicycle lockers.

Sound Transit commissioned three pieces of art for the station through their public art program: Bruce West's sculptures Standing Pear & Friends and Strawberry Duo in the plaza represent the city's agricultural history through halved pears and strawberries; and a series of metal vines by Jean Whitesavage and Nick Lyle hang on the corner of the parking garage and personify "luxuriant growth". The City of Auburn also commissioned a separate art installation, Paul Sorey's Running Figures, which consists of eleven stainless steel figures between the station and the downtown core.

== History ==
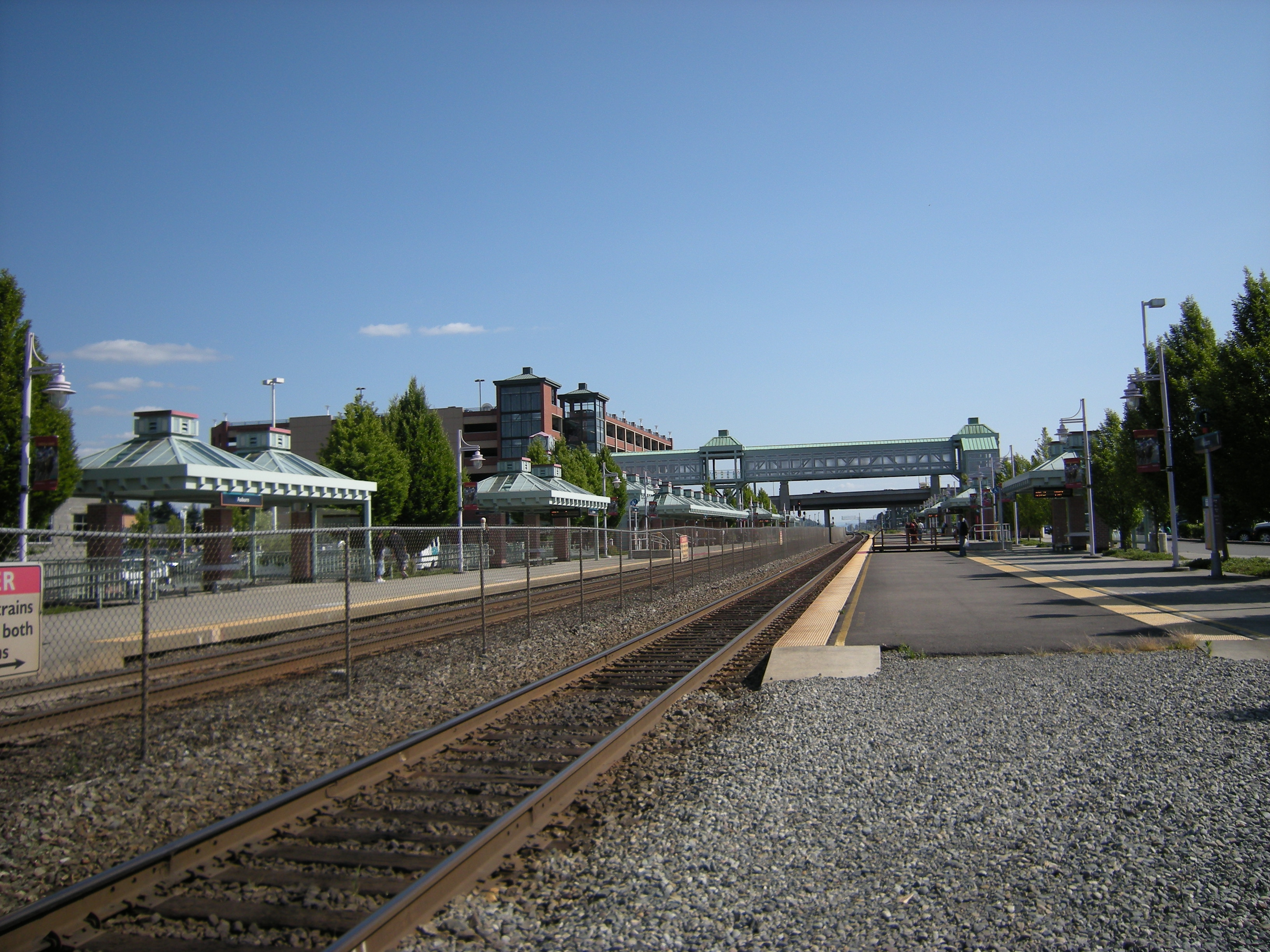
Auburn station's west platform, prior to the construction of a third track

Auburn, initially named Slaughter, received its first staffed train station in October 1889 on the Puget Sound Shore Railroad, part of the Northern Pacific Railway. A large station was built in 1902, near the intersection of C Street and Main Street to the north of the current Sounder platforms. Auburn served as the Northern Pacific's main junction in the Puget Sound region, with trains diverting to either Seattle or Tacoma from Stampede Pass, and a large railyard was built in 1913 for freight operations south of downtown Auburn. The wooden station was nearly destroyed in 1969 by a fire that was started by a passing train's burning soot, creating a 5-foot (1.5 m) hole in the roof. Passenger service at Auburn station continued under Burlington Northern in 1970 and later Amtrak until May 1978, when the depot was vacated. Despite discussions with local business groups to preserve the building by moving it to another site, Burlington Northern demolished the depot in February 1979. Amtrak also stopped transcontinental trains at a separate East Auburn station until the Empire Builder was rerouted away from Stampede Pass in 1981.

In the late 1980s, officials in King County proposed a modern commuter rail system running 22 miles (35 km) between King Street Station in Downtown Seattle and Auburn, where it would terminate near Ellingson Road south of downtown. Metro Transit, the countywide transit operator, began preliminary studies for the commuter rail system in 1987 and identified a site on West Main Street as a potential alternative to the Ellingson Road terminus. The 1993 regional transit plan published by Metro and other transit agencies proposed an extended version of the commuter rail line to Tacoma, with up to three stations in the city of Auburn.

The Downtown Auburn site near Main Street was identified in 1994 as the city's preferred location for a commuter rail station, along with an alternative on the Union Pacific Railroad near the Supermall. The station was included in the rejected 1995 ballot measure and successful 1996 ballot measure that would fund a commuter rail system managed by Sound Transit. The location of Auburn station was approved by the Sound Transit Board in March 1998 and a design contract with Anil Verma Associates was signed in August. On August 12, 1999, Sound Transit broke ground on Auburn station, marking the beginning of Sounder commuter rail construction. Construction of the station was delayed for several months while Sound Transit negotiated a long-term track lease with BNSF Railway, causing Auburn station's cost to exceed its budget by $3.2 million.

The station was opened on September 17, 2000, with a ceremonial inaugural ride to Seattle, and regular Sounder service began the following day. Auburn station had the highest ridership among the three early Sounder stations, which initially had two daily round trips to Seattle; the city government also rebuilt several streets around the station to prepare for future commercial development. The parking garage and pedestrian bridge were opened in March 2003, as part of the second phase of station construction. The $30 million garage was designed with input and funding from the City of Auburn, who signed a 99-year lease on its retail spaces and several parking stalls that were later converted to paid commuter parking.

In 2009, the state legislature funded a Washington State Department of Transportation (WSDOT) study on the feasibility of a short commuter rail service connecting Auburn station to Covington and Maple Valley. A separate WSDOT study in 2013 proposed adding Auburn station to Amtrak Cascades, the region's intercity passenger train, as a replacement for Tukwila station. The study concluded that Auburn would not be a desirable intercity rail stop and recommended against adding it to Cascades service. In 2017, part of the station's west platform was removed for the installation of a third track by BNSF Railway, as part of improvements to the rail corridor.

In response to high demand at Auburn station's parking garage, where stalls are filled before late-morning trains, a second garage was proposed as part of transit ballot measures in 2007 and 2008. The 2008 measure was passed by voters and allocated $30 million for a new garage, but the project was deferred in 2010 due to a decline in sales tax revenue collected by Sound Transit. Funding for the project was restored in early 2016, along with funding for pedestrian and bicycle improvements in downtown Auburn. In late 2017, Sound Transit and the City of Auburn selected a former lumber store two blocks west of city hall as the preferred location for the parking garage. The 500-stall garage and other improvements were expected to cost $60 million and be completed by 2024, but the garage's opening was later delayed to 2027.

== Services ==
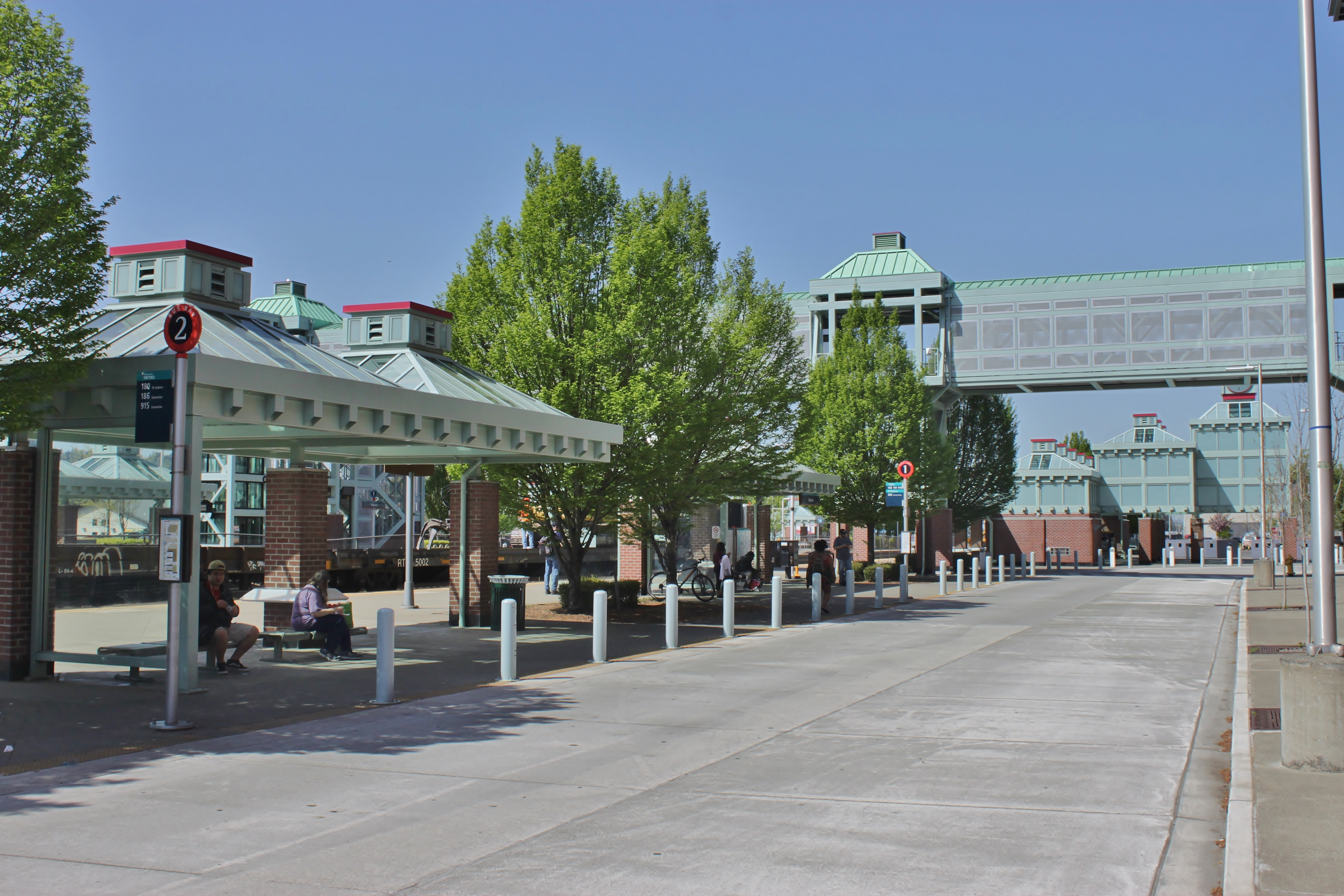
Bus bays at Auburn station

Auburn station is served by 13 daily round-trips on the Sounder S Line, which travel north to King Street Station in Downtown Seattle and south to Tacoma Dome Station or Lakewood station on weekdays. Sounder trains travel from Auburn to Seattle in approximately 35 minutes and to Tacoma in 28 minutes. The station is also a major transit hub for South King County and has six bus bays that are served by Sound Transit Express, King County Metro, and Pierce Transit. Sound Transit Express route 566 begins in Auburn and travels north on State Route 167 to Kent station, Renton, Bellevue Transit Center, and Overlake Transit Center; Auburn is an intermediate stop for route 578, which connects Puyallup station to Downtown Seattle, via Sumner station and Federal Way Transit Center. King County Metro's routes 180, 181, and 186 connect the station to Green River College, Enumclaw, Federal Way, Kent, and Seattle–Tacoma International Airport. King County Metro also runs several dial-a-ride routes from the station to Algona, Pacific, Enumclaw, northern Auburn, and The Outlet Collection Seattle (formerly the Supermall). Pierce Transit's Route 497 is a shuttle between the station and a park and ride in the Lakeland Hills neighborhood, with timed connections to Sounder trains. During horse racing season at Emerald Downs, Sound Transit also operates the Pony Express shuttle from Auburn station.
