= Puyallup station =

Commuter train station in Puyallup, Washington

Puyallup
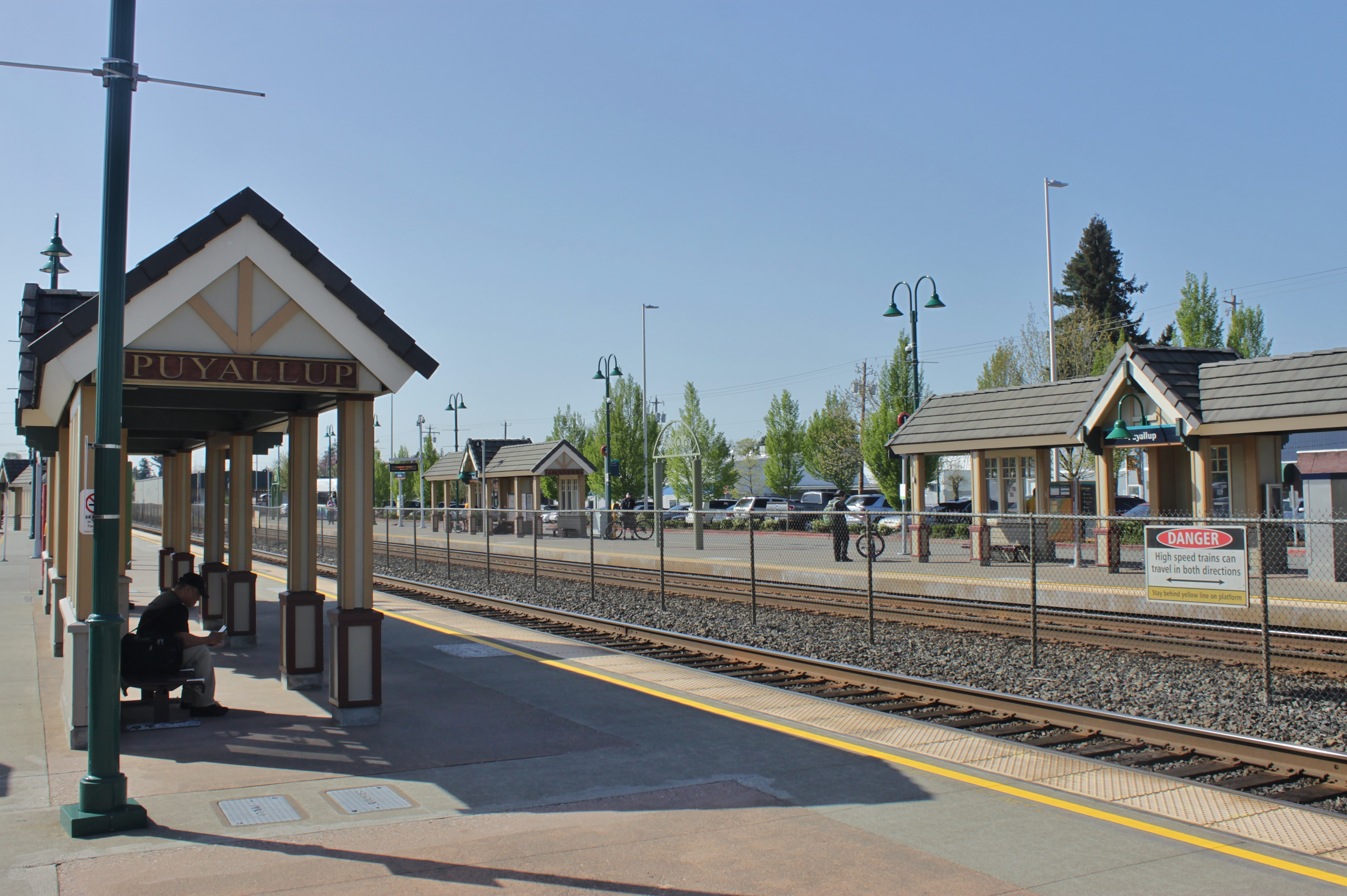
- Looking west from the south platform

General information
- Location: 131 West Main Avenue; Puyallup, Washington; United States
- Coordinates: 47°11′34″N 122°17′46″W
- Owner: Sound Transit
- Line: BNSF Railway Seattle Subdivision
- Platforms: 2 side platforms
- Tracks: 2
- Connections: Sound Transit Express, Pierce Transit

Construction
- Structure type: At-grade
- Parking: 1,044 parking spaces
- Cycle facilities: Bicycle lockers
- Accessible: Yes

History
- Opened: February 5, 2001

Passengers
- 518 daily weekday boardings (2025); 131,673 total boardings (2025)

Services
| Preceding station | Sound Transit | Following station |
Sounder
| Tacoma Dome toward Lakewood | S Line | Sumner toward Seattle |
Location

Puyallup station is a train station in the city of Puyallup, Washington, United States. It is served by the S Line, a Sounder commuter rail line operated by Sound Transit that runs from Pierce County to Seattle. The station is located northwest of downtown Puyallup and includes two platforms, several bus bays, and 640 parking spaces. Puyallup station opened on February 5, 2001, on the site of the city's original train depot, which was built in 1877 and demolished in 1974. The station's park and ride was expanded to 1,044 stalls in 2023 with the opening of a new parking garage. In addition to train service, the station is also served by Sound Transit Express and Pierce Transit buses that connect Puyallup to nearby cities.

== Description ==
Puyallup station is located on the north side of Main Avenue in downtown Puyallup, between 5th Street and Meridian Street. It consists of two 600-foot (183 m) side platforms on the north and south sides of the two railroad tracks, along with several platform shelters that are shared with four bus bays, primarily on the north side, and a drop-off area. The station has 1,044 parking stalls available through several park and ride lots and a five-story parking garage with 510 stalls and a pedestrian bridge over 5th Street Northwest. Additional park and ride spaces are available at two lots in downtown Puyallup that are leased by Sound Transit. Puyallup station also has five bicycle racks and 28 bicycle lockers located on the platform and in the garage.

The station is connected to downtown Puyallup via two walkways along the tracks that run west to 5th Street and east to Meridian Avenue. Its shelters were designed to resemble Puyallup's historic train depot and incorporate elements of the Craftsman architectural style. Sound Transit commissioned one piece of public art for Puyallup station, Speed the Plow by Gloria Bornstein, which consists of seven decorative arches that reference Puyallup's geologic and agricultural history with depictions of farming tools.

== History ==
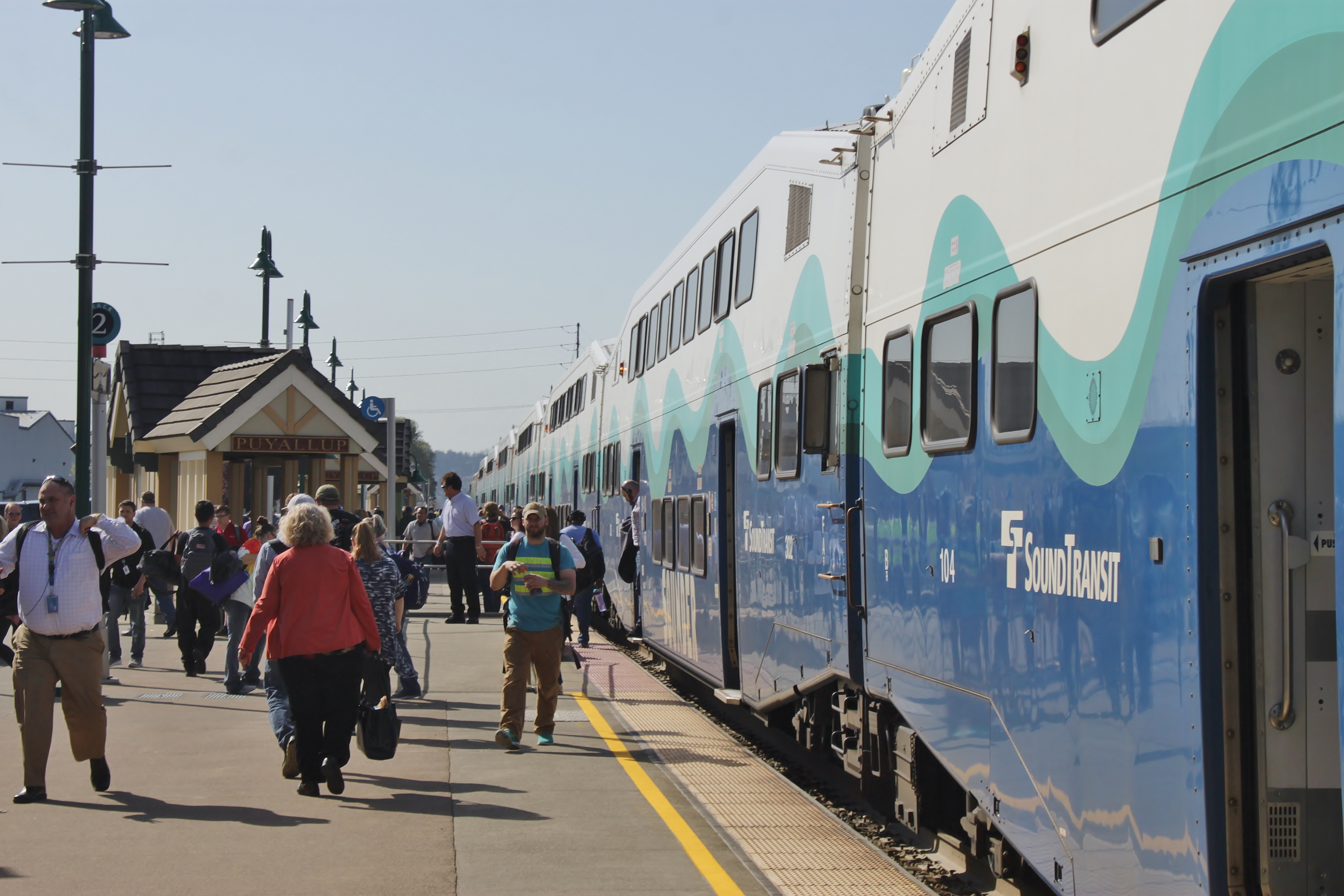
Passengers disembarking from a Sounder train at Puyallup station

Puyallup's first train station was built in 1877 for the Northern Pacific Railway, shortly after the town was platted by founder Ezra Meeker. The original depot buildings were replaced in 1930 by a new facility, shortly before the cancellation of passenger service to downtown Puyallup. The Northern Pacific depot was abandoned in the 1960s and finally dismantled in October 1974 after being bought by a railroad worker. During the 1980s, Amtrak ran limited passenger service from Tacoma to Puyallup for the Western Washington Fair.

Puyallup was chosen a potential commuter rail stop during early studies into a Seattle–Tacoma line in the late 1980s. The 1993 regional transit plan published by the region's transit agencies proposed Puyallup as a commuter rail stop, deferring to the local government to choose a final site for the station. The city developed a shortlist of seven locations for the station in early 1994, along both the Union Pacific and BNSF railroads, and began a series of public hearings to determine which to endorse. Business leaders voiced their support for a downtown station along the BNSF route, as part of a larger revitalization of the city's downtown, and a mail survey of residents voted in favor of a downtown station at Stewart Avenue and 3rd Street, followed by a station in eastern Puyallup at Shaw Road. In October 1994, the Puyallup city council endorsed the downtown site as its preferred location for a commuter rail station on the BNSF route.

The commuter rail system was part of the rejected 1995 ballot measure and successful 1996 transit plan that funded a regional system managed by Sound Transit. The Downtown Puyallup site was chosen by Sound Transit in early 1998 and a $688,000 contract was awarded to Merritt + Pardini Architects to design the station. The station's design, based on the "Craftsman" style of the old Northern Pacific depot, was scaled back in early 1999 due to a shortfall in the project's $10.6 million budget. A supplemental budget was approved later in the year, restoring the planned design of Puyallup station, and additional property acquisitions were undertaken by Sound Transit to accommodate the change. Lugo Construction won the $3.7 million contract to build Puyallup station in March 2000 and construction began two months later. Construction on the station began months later than other stations, due to changes in the final design process, and Puyallup was skipped by Sounder trains during the first months of service in late 2000.

Sounder service at Kent and Puyallup stations began on February 5, 2001. The opening dates for both stations were consolidated together, with Puyallup opening a month earlier than originally planned. A formal grand opening for Puyallup station was celebrated on May 5, including the full opening of the station's 300 parking stalls. The opening of the station was credited with attracting new businesses and development to downtown Puyallup, as part of the city's desired revitalization plan that also included a new public library, central park, and city hall. The station's park and ride was expanded in 2010 with an additional 219 parking spaces at a satellite lot adjacent to the Washington State Fairgrounds.

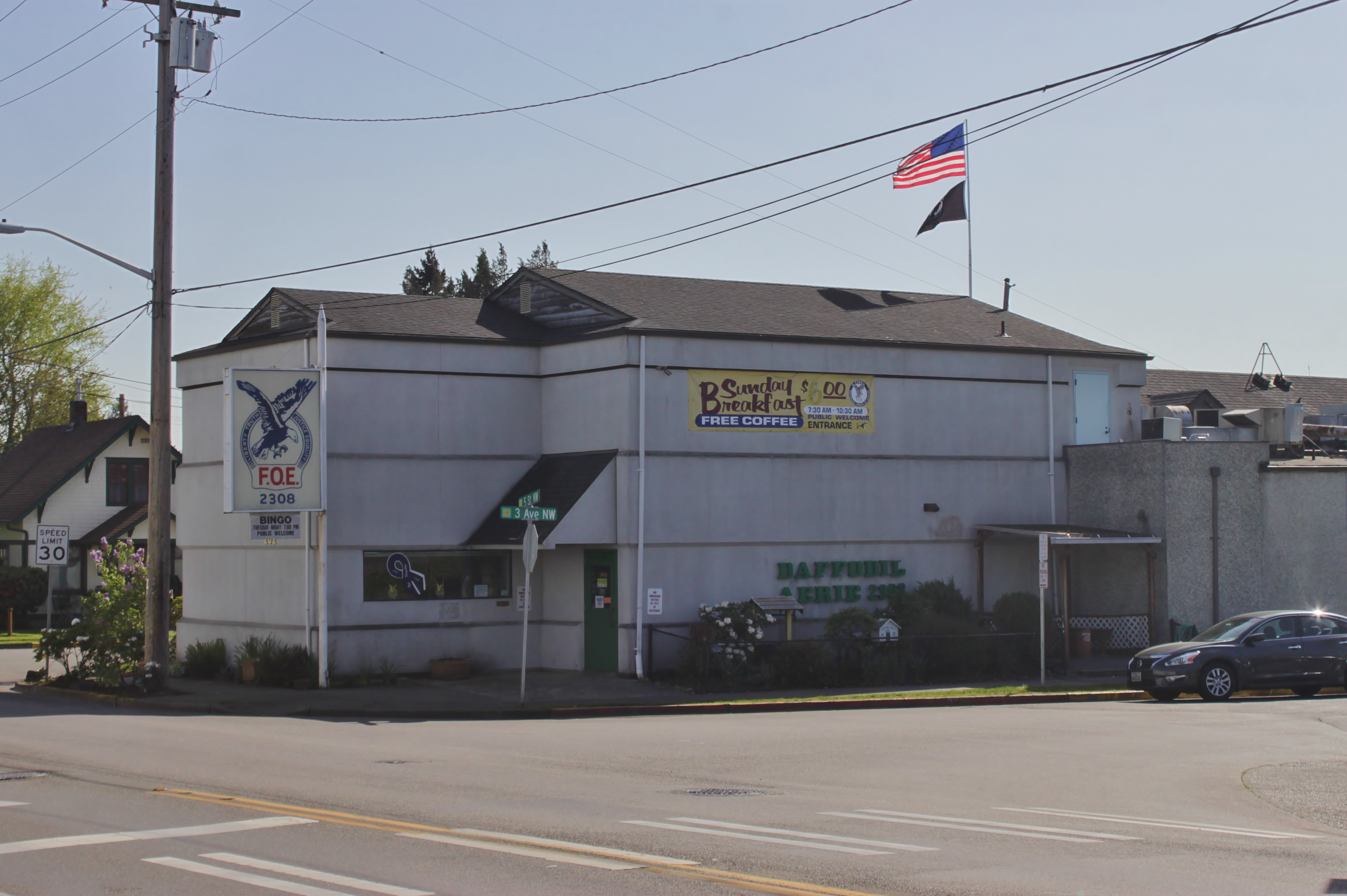
The Puyallup lodge of the Fraternal Order of Eagles, which was demolished for Puyallup station's parking garage

The need for expanded parking at Puyallup station led to formal proposals by the city and Sound Transit to build a parking garage for commuters. The garage was first considered in 2007 and approved the following year in the Sound Transit 2 ballot measure, as part of a station access project. In 2014, Sound Transit approved a preliminary plan to build a 420-stall parking garage on property owned by the Puyallup Fraternal Order of Eagles, located west of the station's platforms, along with potential pedestrian overpasses crossing 5th Avenue and the railroad tracks. The garage project was stalled in early 2016 by the discovery of unstable soil at the site and the Eagles chapter declining to negotiate a land sale.

Despite the issues, Sound Transit approved construction on the $60 million garage and access project in 2016, including a 500-stall parking garage at the Eagles site and a 165-stall parking lot on 3rd Avenue. Sound Transit began eminent domain procedures against the Eagles and their property in July 2017, prompting protests from Eagles members to the Puyallup city council. A settlement between Sound Transit and the Eagles was reached in 2018. Construction on the parking garage began in November 2020 and was originally scheduled to open by early 2022, but was delayed by several months due while awaiting safety improvements at the adjacent track crossing. The garage and pedestrian bridge opened on March 27, 2023, at a cost of $82.4 million. A related project to improve bicycle and pedestrian access, including 50 curb ramps and bicycle lanes, is planned to be completed in 2024.

== Services ==
Puyallup station is served by 13 daily round-trips on the Sounder S Line, which travel north to King Street Station in Downtown Seattle and south to Tacoma Dome Station or Lakewood station on weekdays. Sounder trains travel from Puyallup to Seattle in approximately 49 minutes and to Tacoma in 13 minutes. In addition to regular Sounder service, Sound Transit runs special weekend trains from Everett and Seattle to Puyallup station for the annual Washington State Fair, with free shuttle buses from the station to the fairgrounds.

The station is also served by Sound Transit Express and Pierce Transit buses, which stop at several bus bays on the north platform. Sound Transit Express route 578 begins in Puyallup and travels north to Downtown Seattle via Sumner station, Auburn station, and Federal Way Transit Center. Pierce Transit's routes connect Puyallup station to South Hill Mall, the South Hill area, Tacoma, Milton, and Federal Way. Since 2023, the agency had also operated a microtransit zone within Puyallup that includes the station in its service area.
