= Pierce Transit =

Local public transit operator in Washington, United States

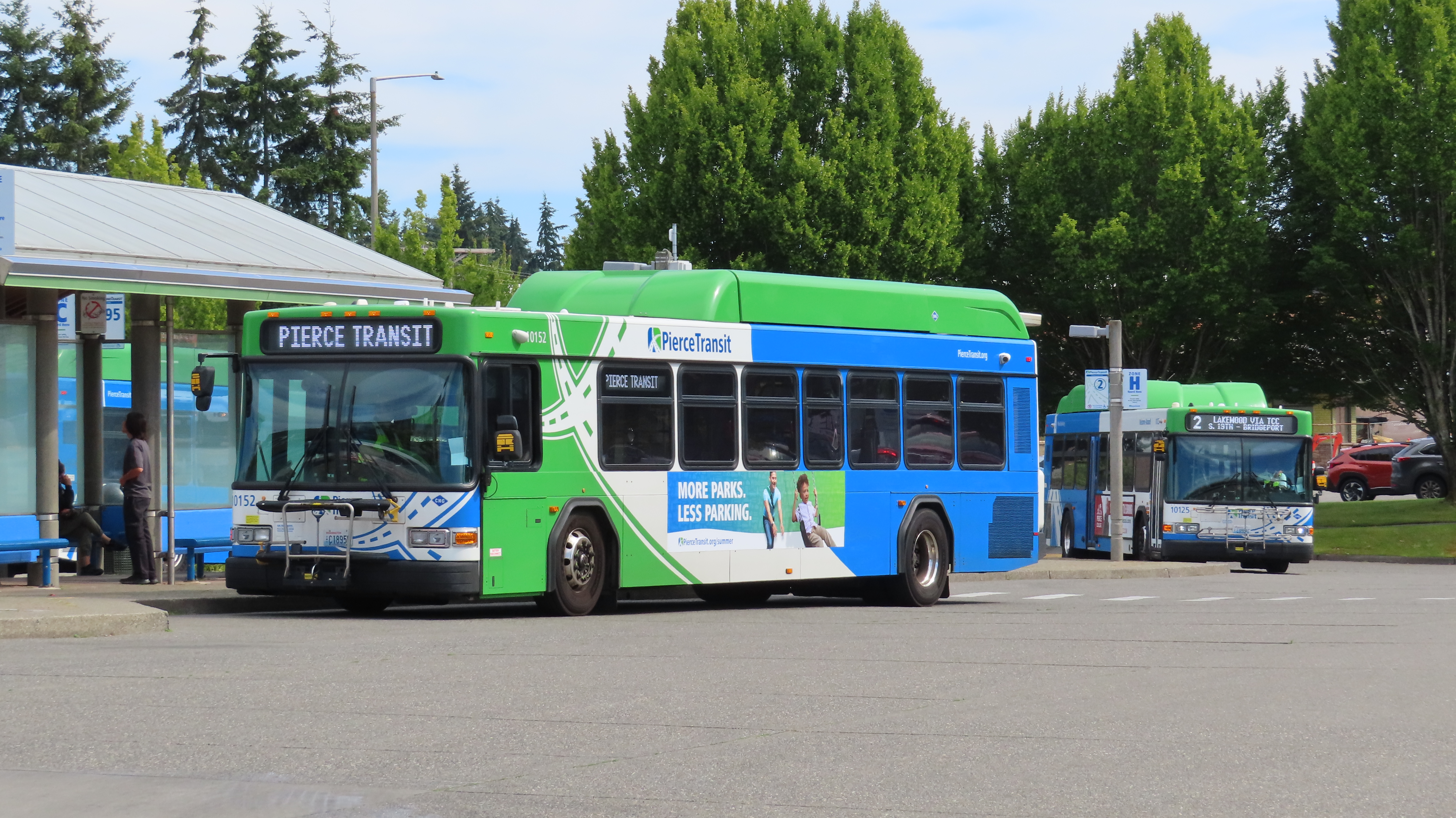
- Pierce Transit buses at Tacoma Community College
- Founded: 1979
- Commenced operation: January 1, 1980
- Headquarters: 3701 96th Street Southwest; Lakewood, Washington
- Locale: Pierce County, Washington
- Service type: Bus, microtransit, paratransit, vanpool
- Routes: 29
- Stops: 1,981
- Fleet: 168 buses, 100 paratransit vans, 298 vanpool vehicles
- Daily ridership: 29,700 (weekdays, Q2 2026)
- Annual ridership: 7,833,600 (2025)
- Fuel type: Diesel, compressed natural gas, diesel–electric hybrid, battery electric
- Chief executive: Mike Griffus
- Employees: 967 (2026)
- Website: piercetransit.org

Pierce Transit (officially the Pierce County Public Transportation Benefit Area Corporation) is the primary public transit operator in Pierce County, Washington, United States. It serves the urbanized areas of the county, including the city of Tacoma, and connects with other transit systems in the Seattle metropolitan area. Pierce Transit operates fixed-route buses, on-demand microtransit, and dial-a-ride trips, and also manages a vanpool fleet. The system has 29 routes, 7 microtransit zones, and other services that cover its service area that spans 292 square miles (760 km^{2}). In 2025, Pierce Transit had a ridership of 7,833,600, or about 29,700 per weekday as of the second quarter of 2026. The agency has a fleet of 168 buses that are primarily powered by compressed natural gas. It also operates several Sound Transit Express routes under contract with Sound Transit, the regional transit authority of the Seattle metropolitan area.

The public transportation benefit area was established in 1979 and began service as Pierce Transit in 1980, when it took over the existing Tacoma Transit system that had been run by the city government since 1961. The agency expanded beyond Tacoma in the 1980s and began to operate direct express buses to Seattle in 1990. Several of its major facilities, including a Downtown Tacoma hub at Commerce Street Station and a regional hub at Tacoma Dome Station, were constructed later in the decade. Pierce Transit lost a significant source of its revenue, the motor vehicle excise tax, in 2000 and cut services as a result.

The agency is primarily funded by a sales tax that was increased in 2002 through a voter-approved referendum. A similar sales tax increase was unsuccessfully proposed in 2011 to offset depleted reserves during the Great Recession. Several cities withdrew from the public transportation benefit area after their routes were cut; a second attempt to raise the sales tax failed in 2012. Pierce Transit's sales tax rate was increased after a 2026 ballot measure was approved by voters.

== History ==
=== Predecessors and formation ===
A streetcar operated by the Tacoma Railway and Power Company in Downtown Tacoma, 1925

The first streetcar in Tacoma was a horse-drawn line that began service in May 1888 and was replaced by an electric line that opened on February 10, 1890. The lines were built by private companies and most were consolidated into the Tacoma Railway and Power Company, which controlled a 76-mile (122 km) network with 21 streetcars by the late 1930s. A single cable car ran east–west on 11th and 13th streets to connect the streetcar lines separated by Tacoma's large hills. A municipal streetcar, later folded into the Tacoma Municipal Belt Line system, operated from 1917 to 1938, served the industrial tideflats around the Port of Tacoma. Tacoma Railway and Power ended streetcar service in the city on June 11, 1938, and replaced them with a fleet of 85 motor buses that entered service over the following months. The company was renamed to the Tacoma Transit Company in 1941 and acquired the bus operations of the Municipal Belt Line on January 1, 1947. Tacoma Transit became an employee-owned company in 1954 through a sale of stock that would be financed by profits in a six-year period. The company earned a gas tax break from the state government but were unable to arrange for a direct subsidy from the city government, leading to a potential foreclosure if stockholders were not repaid at the end of the six-year period in October 1960. The employees petitioned the city government for a full acquisition funded by a bond issue, which was approved by voters on November 8, 1960. The system carried 7.5 million total passengers in 1960.

Tacoma Transit became a city department on February 1, 1961, after the acquisition of the company was completed. The city government paid $450,000 to the company's stockholders, $300,000 to the employees as reimbursement for their purchase, and $100,000 to cover the costs of the transition of operations. The fleet of 103 buses was retained and the company's employees received a pay raise to compensate for their former contribution to paying down debt. Tacoma Transit was funded directly from the city government's general fund and subsidized at a $14,000 monthly loss by 1964. The department laid off 30 drivers and raised fares to compensate for the system's financial issues. The city council endorsed a dedicated tax for transit that was set at 75 cents per month for households and added to utility bills. The system carried an average of 25,000 daily passengers by January 1967, when the tax was approved by city voters. By 1973, Tacoma Transit served 90 percent of homes and businesses in the city with buses that typically ran on an hourly schedule and increased to a maximum of every 10 minutes during peak periods. Other areas of Pierce County were served by various private companies that connected to Tacoma Transit routes at transfer points and also provided service as far north as Federal Way.

In 1975, the Pierce County government commissioned a study into a potential countywide transit system that would be established as a public transportation benefit area (PTBA), a new type of authority in Washington state. A conference of local governments was convened in 1978 to develop the transit system plan. Tacoma Transit presented a preliminary boundary for the PTBA that covered its existing service area and expanded to Steilacoom, Puyallup, and Sumner. The Pierce County Public Transit Benefit Area Authority was created by the county commission in April 1979 with the goal of establishing a countywide bus system that would be funded by a 0.3 percent sales tax. Under the plan, Tacoma Transit would be acquired and expanded to serve most of Pierce County, with the exception of Gig Harbor and cities in the eastern part of the county. On November 6, 1979, voters within the PTBA boundaries approved the sales tax to fund the new transit system.

=== First years as Pierce Transit ===
The former logo of Pierce Transit, adopted in 1981

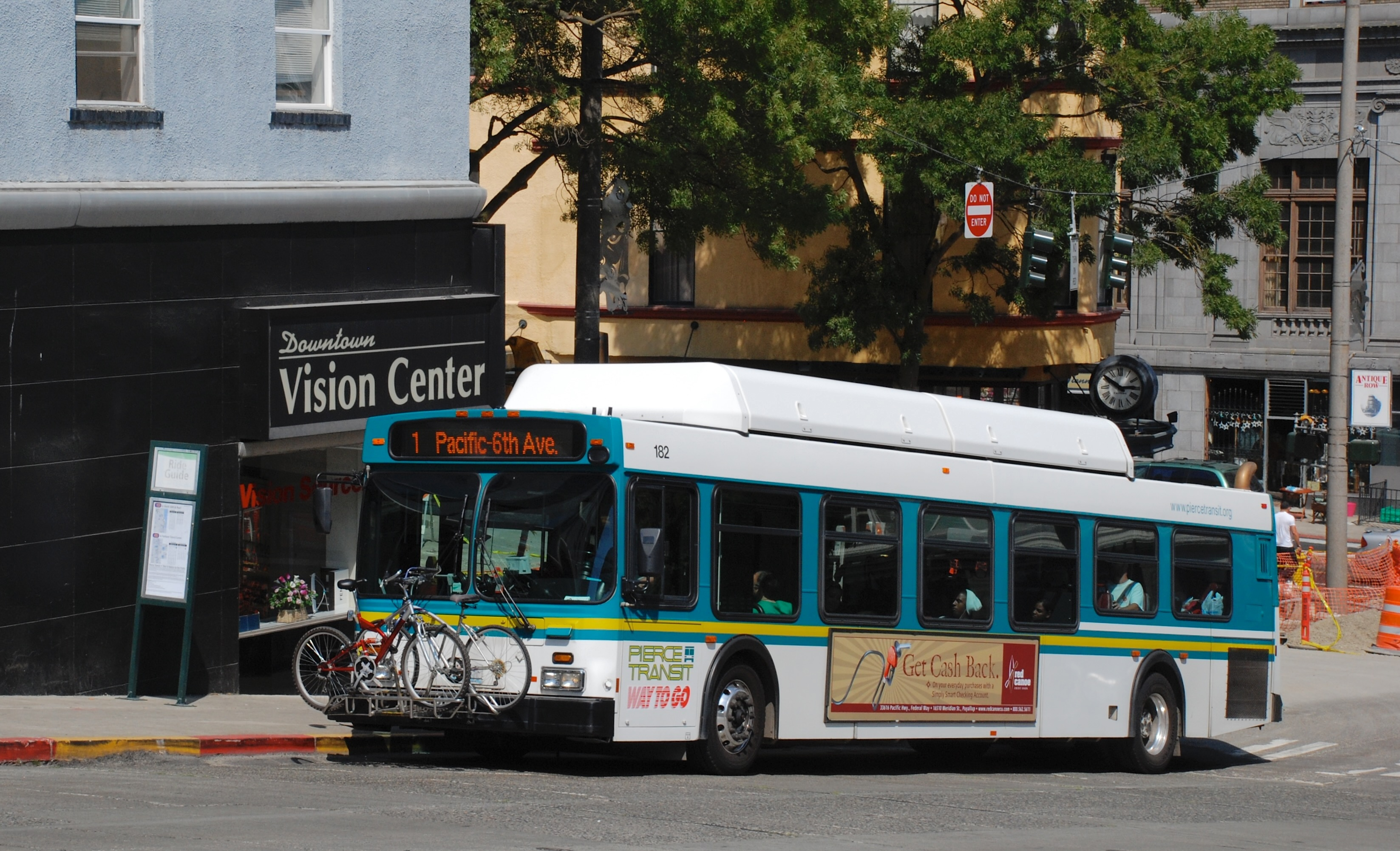
A CNG bus painted in the former Pierce Transit livery

The Pierce County PBTA began operations on January 1, 1980, taking over Tacoma Transit routes in the city and a section of Pacific Avenue towards Spanaway. The agency inherited 115 buses from Tacoma Transit and an order of 33 new buses that had already been placed and awaited delivery; 22 used buses were acquired from other cities to supplement the Tacoma fleet. A temporary agreement was in place until the final $3 million cost for their assets was reached with the city government in February 1982 after two years of negotiations. The PTBA also took over routes in Lakewood and Steilacoom, operated by private carrier Lakewood Bayshore Stage Lines, on February 1. Pierce Transit was adopted as the official name of the system in June 1980 after two rounds of voting; the name "Tahoma Transit" was favored by staff, while board members proposed "The Bus" and "GO" ("Grand Omnibus").

Pierce Transit began expanding outside of Tacoma on July 1, 1980, with new routes to Federal Way, Fife, Milton, Puyallup, Sumner, Fort Lewis, and McChord Air Force Base. The system grew from 20 routes under Tacoma Transit to 36 and replaced much of the original fleet, including Twin Coach buses that had been in service since 1948. The Federal Way route was created through an agreement with Metro Transit, King County's system, to provide a seamless transfer to an existing express route to Downtown Seattle. These new routes competed with Tacoma Suburban Lines and other private companies under management of Paul Harmon, who filed a lawsuit to continue operating within the Pierce Transit service area. Harmon and the agency had not reached an agreement on operations or a sale, which led to the lawsuit. Under threat of a potential injunction from the Pierce County Superior Court, a tentative agreement was reached between Pierce Transit and Harmon, whose companies would operate the new routes under a contract with the agency. Pierce Transit was obligated to buy out the system and filed a condemnation suit after negotiations with Harmon stalled; a final price of $550,000 in compensation and damages was awarded in the superior court.

In 1981, the system had 39 routes with a combined length of 683 miles (1,099 km), 7 transit centers, and 179 buses that covered its service area of 275 square miles (710 km^{2}). Pierce Transit carried 12.4 million total passengers that year. The agency adopted its logo, a simplified bus drawing, and began repainting buses in a new white livery with orange and brown stripes. Fares were increased in January 1982 from the original 25-cent rate used by Tacoma Transit and left unchanged for 25 years. The original headquarters and bus base on Sprague Avenue west of downtown Tacoma, inherited from Tacoma Transit, was acquired outright from the city government in 1985. Pierce Transit had already approved construction of a new headquarters facility and chose a site on South Tacoma Way in modern-day Lakewood after an earlier option in western Tacoma drew opposition from local residents. Construction of the $14 million facility, which included four buildings on 20 acres (8.1 ha) with capacity for up to 200 buses, began in 1986 and was completed in late 1987. A direct express bus service from Lakewood and Tacoma to Downtown Seattle began service on September 17, 1990, with twelve converted buses operated by Metro under a contract with Pierce Transit. The routes were later converted into Sound Transit Express routes, funded by the regional transit authority and operated by Pierce Transit, in 1999.

On June 14, 1993, Pierce Transit opened a major transit center on Commerce Street in Downtown Tacoma that would serve 1,300 buses on a typical weekday. Commerce Street Station includes a garage with layover space for 24 buses, an office, and plaza space; it cost $23.3 million to construct. It was closed for several months during construction of Tacoma Link, a light rail line that would share the street, from 2002 to 2003. Pierce Transit began planning a regional transit center near the Tacoma Dome in the mid-1990s in anticipation of future commuter rail service. The first phase of Tacoma Dome Station opened on October 25, 1997, for use by local and express buses. Sounder commuter rail service to Tacoma began in 2000 and was followed by the opening of Tacoma Link, the state's first modern light rail service, in August 2003.

=== Service cuts and ballot measures ===
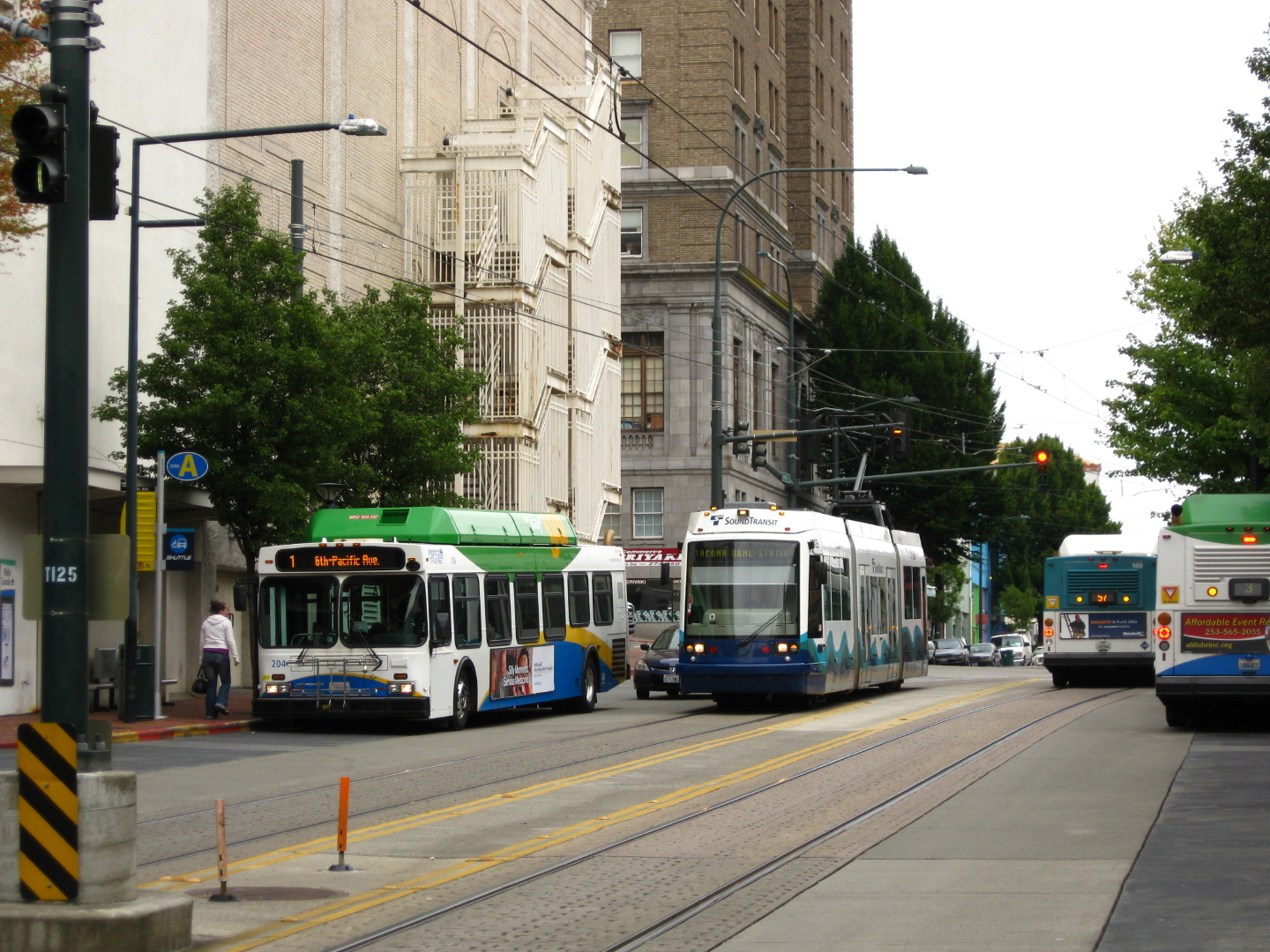
Pierce Transit buses and a Tacoma Link streetcar on Commerce Street, 2009

The passage of Initiative 695 in 1999 eliminated the use of motor vehicle excise tax, a funding source for local transit throughout the state; the initiative had been ruled unconstitutional by the Washington Supreme Court, but the tax cut was passed by the state legislature. In February 2000, Pierce Transit cut 14 percent of its service and increased its fares to temporarily make up for revenue from the tax, which made up 38 percent of the agency's operating budget. A 0.3 percent sales tax increase to replace lost revenue and fund new transit service was approved by 54 percent of voters during a special election on February 5, 2002. The tax increase came into effect at the beginning of July and prevented a potential cut of up to 45 percent for bus service, including all service on weekends, and 25 percent for paratransit. Service was expanded in September and was followed by new routes in eastern Pierce County to serve portions of South Hill, Sumner, and Bonney Lake. Daily ridership reached over 46,000 passengers in May 2003. The tax increase also funded the purchase of new compressed natural gas buses, 400 shelters at bus stops, and the construction three park-and-ride lots. Pierce Transit set a one-day ridership record on July 15, 2007, during the opening ceremonies of the eastbound Tacoma Narrows Bridge. The agency carried 56,000 trips across all buses, including three event shuttle routes from Tacoma Community College, Tacoma Narrows Airport, and Gig Harbor High School.

Amid a global oil shortage and high fuel prices, Pierce Transit carried an average of 49,000 passengers on weekdays in April 2008—a 12 percent increase from the previous year and a new agency record. Fares were increased by 25 cents in January 2009 to compensate for a 9 percent decline in sales tax revenue attributed to the economic recession. The system expanded further into King County in February 2009 with the launch of a shuttle route in Auburn between the city's Sounder station and the Lakeland Hills neighborhood, which straddles the county line. The route was partially funded by King County Metro and Sound Transit. Pierce Transit completed the rollout of an accessible passenger information system the following month that included on-board visual and audio announcements for bus stops and GPS tracking for dispatch. The agency began to use its reserve funds to continue operations and raised its fares by 25 cents but were unable to avoid a 5 percent service cut in July 2009 alongside the eliminiation of 51 employee positions. A larger service reduction that would consolidate Pierce Transit from 51 routes to 23 and largely remove service from outlying areas was proposed in early 2010 in the event that new revenue could not be raised. The board of commissioners scheduled a vote on a 0.3 percent sales tax increase for the upcoming February 2011 elections and raised adult fares by 25 cents.

The ballot measure, named Proposition 1, was defeated by 54 percent of voters on February 8, 2011. The plan drew opposition due to its lack of service increases and a perception that the agency had not found more efficient uses of its existing funding. Pierce Transit announced plans to decrease service by 35 percent by the following year to save $30 million in annual costs that would have been covered by the increased sales tax. A cut of 20 percent was implemented on February 28 after a compressed natural gas fueling station at the Lakewood bus base exploded and was rendered unusable. Much of the fleet uses compressed natural gas as its fuel source and required refueling at a station in Sea-Tac. The temporary service reduction, which mostly affected rural areas and the county's eastern cities, was then made permanent in June as part of the first round of service cuts after the failure of Proposition 1. The second round of cuts, made in early October, eliminated 16 bus routes to complete the 35 percent service reduction and was followed by layoffs for 200 employees.

=== City withdrawals and service recovery ===
Commerce Street Station in Downtown Tacoma, a major hub of Pierce Transit service

A special committee was convened by the Pierce Transit board in November 2011 to study the agency's service area boundaries at the request of several cities that sought to withdraw from the public transportation benefit area. The withdrawals had been discussed by political leaders in eastern Pierce County a year earlier in response to proposed service cuts in the event that Proposition 1 failed. These cuts would have removed all local service in several cities and leave them with limited routes that primarily served commuters during peak periods. The committee, composed of representatives from the county government and municipalities across the county, voted unanimously to approve a redrawn public transportation benefit area boundary on March 8, 2012. The Pierce Transit service area, which had previously covered 530 square miles (1,400 km^{2}), was shrunk to 292 square miles (760 km^{2}). The cities of Bonney Lake, Buckley, DuPont, Orting, and Sumner were removed from the service area alongside some unincorporated areas effective May 8. An existing route between Sumner and Bonney Lake was transferred in June to Sound Transit, which continued to collect taxes from both cities.

Pierce Transit reorganized its board of commissioners to remove the withdrawn areas and capped representation from Tacoma at four members to increase participation from small cities. In June, the agency proposed a second version of Proposition 1 with the same 0.3 percent sales tax increase that would restore bus routes within the smaller service area and prevent further cuts. The ballot measure was opposed by the Tacoma–Pierce County chamber of commerce, who cited the 9.8 percent sales tax rate in Tacoma that would result from the increase, and critics of Pierce Transit who blamed cuts on employee wages. Pierce Transit signed a new collective bargaining agreement with their employees prior to the vote that paused wage increases and lowered health insurance premiums to save costs for the agency. On November 6, 2012, Proposition 1 was rejected by a narrow margin of 704 votes out of over 200,000 ballots cast from within the public transportation benefit area; a recount was not funded by the supporters' campaign. Four cities in eastern Pierce County—Edgewood, Fife, Milton, and Puyallup—considered a proposal to leave Pierce Transit and form their own agency in protest of planned service cuts.

The agency reduced its workforce by 10 percent in May 2013 through layoffs and eliminated positions to prepare for its upcoming service cuts in September. The scheduled 28 percent reduction in bus service, which had reached 399,000 service hours, was deferred after sales tax returns earlier in the year exceeded revenue projections. In June 2015, Pierce Transit restored some of the weekend and high-frequency service it had cut in prior years. The agency had accrued additional reserve funds that were used to renovate some of its older transit centers and restore 35,000 service hours in March 2017. Pierce Transit partnered with Lyft in 2018 to subsidize ride-hailing trips within areas four with limited transit service. The program was funded by a grant from the Federal Transit Administration to expand access to transit service by transporting passengers to transit centers. The agency also published plans for a bus rapid transit line on Pacific Avenue between Tacoma and Spanaway that would use bus lanes and dedicated stations. It would require funding from the federal government and other sources to cover an estimated $150 million in planning and construction costs.

=== Pandemic cuts and microtransit ===
In March 2020, Pierce Transit suspended fare collection aboard buses and instructed passengers to use the rear door to limit contact with drivers as part of precautionary measures during the COVID-19 pandemic. After the state government issued stay-at-home orders to reduce the spread of COVID-19, the agency reduced its bus service and carried 64 percent fewer passengers compared to the following year. Pierce Transit reduced its bus service by 38 percent by using a modified version of their normal Sunday schedules for all days and limited capacity to 15 passengers. A demand-response service was opened for essential workers to arrange transportation on weekdays. Revenue declined by $47 million due to the pandemic's affect on retail sales and fares; 63 employees were furloughed and 25 bus drivers were laid off as a result. Pierce Transit also deployed several buses to serve as Wi-Fi access points for areas with poor internet connectivity. Bus service returned to normal service on most routes in May and fare collection resumed the following month.

A microtransit service, named Runner, launched in August 2020 to serve the Tacoma waterfront and Ruston after the suspension of seasonal bus service in the area. Several low-ridership routes were replaced by Runner microtransit zones as the system expanded in the 2020s. The bus system was restored to 95 percent of its normal levels in March 2021 with the reintroduction of Sunday trips on several routes, but was cut temporarily due to a shortage of drivers. Capacity restrictions were lifted in July on all services after the state government's stay-at-home orders were reduced. The agency also removed a total of 214 bus stops—which comprised 10 percent of the system—as part of speed improvements for routes implemented in early 2022. The planned bus rapid transit system was deferred amid high construction costs and disputes with property owners along the route. It was replaced by the Stream Community Line, a limited-stop route on the corridor between Downtown Tacoma and Spanaway that began service on April 1, 2024. The route's southern terminus, Spanaway Transit Center, opened in August 2025 as the first new Pierce Transit facility in 27 years.

A third ballot measure to raise the sales tax rate within the public transportation benefit area to 0.9 percent was approved by the Pierce Transit board of commissioners in July 2026. The agency had projected that their reserves would drop below their minimum threshold of $50 million by 2032 while current service levels were maintained. The sales tax increase was anticipated to contribute $64 million in annual revenue that would be primarily used on a 47 percent service expansion that creates new routes and improves service on weekends. The agency also proposes fare-free service for passengers over the age of 65. The additional revenue would also prevent a series of service cuts proposed from 2029 to 2031 as the remaining reserve funds were depleted and spent on operational needs. The sales tax measure, named Proposition 1, was approved by 58 percent of voters on November 3, 2026.

== Services ==
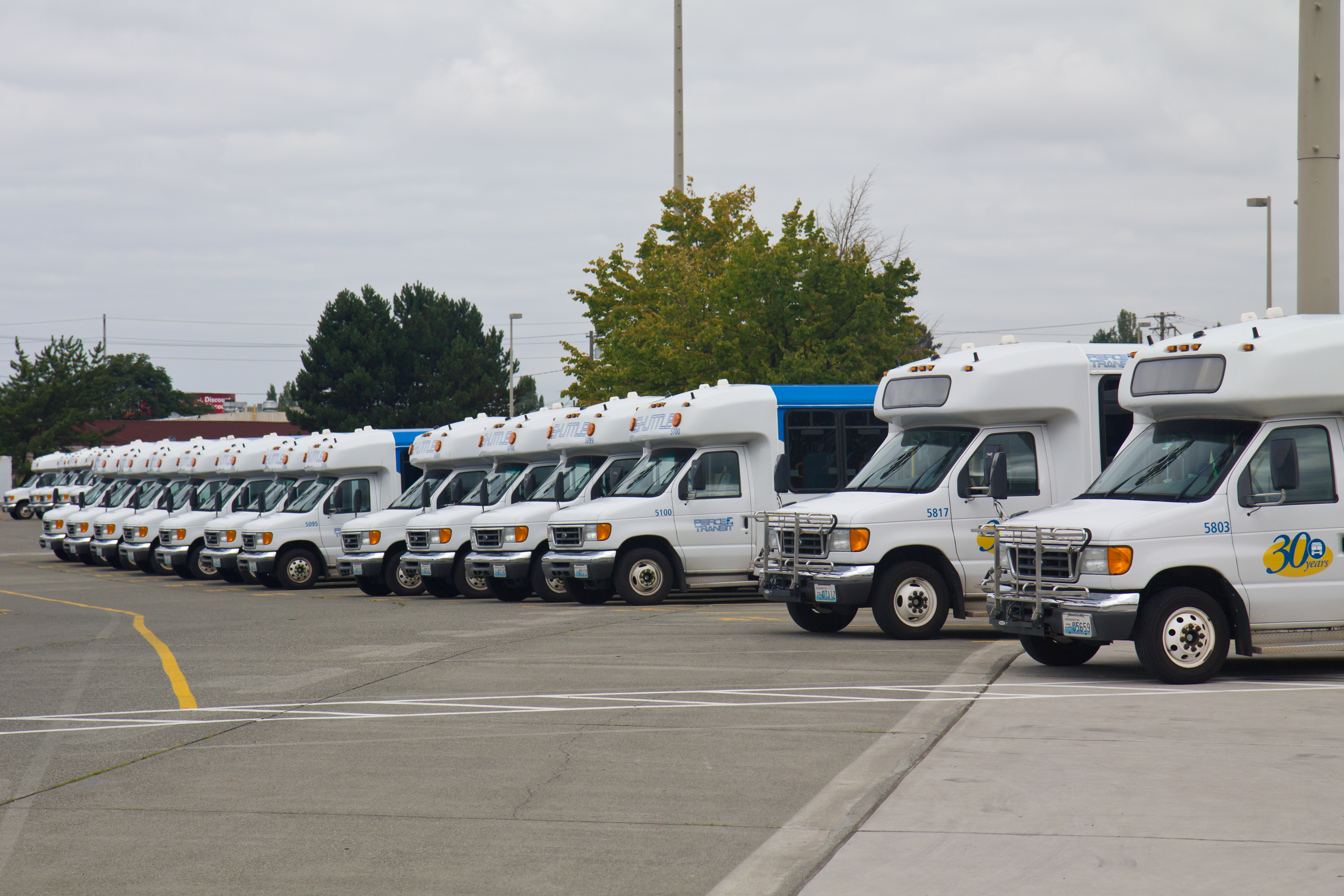
A fleet of vans used for "Shuttle" paratransit service

As of 2026, Pierce Transit has 29 bus routes to cover its service area. They range from frequent routes on corridors in urban areas that run seven days per week to express routes that only operate on weekdays. There were 7.8 million total boardings on all services in 2025 with a weekday average of 25,656 passengers. Fixed route buses carried 7.04 million of those trips—an increase of 4 percent from the previous year. The busiest corridor was Route 1, which had 1.25 million trips.

The agency has an on-demand microtransit service, named "Runner", that serves seven zones and requires passengers to book their trip through a mobile app or phone call. The service was launched in 2020 to serve the Ruston Way corridor and was subsequently expanded to other areas with fewer fixed-route options; it also replaced some low-ridership bus routes. Runner carried 86,000 total passengers in 2025 across six zones. The agency operates the "Shuttle" dial-a-ride service, also known as paratransit, for customers with disabilities who qualify under the Americans with Disabilities Act of 1990. The system provides door-to-door trips within 3/4 mile (1.2 km) of a bus route and carried 316,391 total boardings in 2025. Pierce Transit's vanpool fleet, named "Rideshare", is available to commuters who travel in organized groups of three or more people. It carried 388,511 total trips in 2025 with 224 active groups that commute to worksites in eight counties.

Pierce Transit also operates seasonal circulator routes and event buses. The Waterfront Connector in Gig Harbor runs on Thursdays and weekends from June to August. The service previously used replica trolley buses with a special red-and-yellow livery. Another summer trolley route operated from Downtown Tacoma to Ruston and Point Defiance Park via a waterfront route from 2017 to 2018. During the annual Washington State Fair in Puyallup, Pierce Transit operates express buses from Lakewood station and South Hill Mall; the service was paused during the COVID-19 pandemic and returned in 2026.

=== Fares ===
The one-way trip fare for Pierce Transit is $2 for adults, $1 for passengers eligible for discounted fares, and free for passengers under the age of 19 years old. The discounted fare applies to passengers over the age of 65 years old, have a Medicare card and regional reduced fare permit, or are enrolled in the ORCA Lift program for low-income households. Pierce Transit accepts payment through cash, the Transit smartphone app, and the regional ORCA card system, which also allows for transfers between different operators. The agency also offers a day pass in the form of a ticket with a magnetic stripe that is $5 for adults and $2 at the discounted rate. Fares for youth passengers (under the age of 19) were made free in September 2022 as part of a statewide program funded by the Climate Commitment Act. Pierce Transit previously offered a "summer pass" for youth passengers at a fixed rate for unlimited rides within the system from June to September.

== Stream bus rapid transit ==
The logo of Stream, a bus rapid transit brand operated by Pierce Transit

Stream is a bus rapid transit system that has been under development by Pierce Transit since 2018. The first corridor, the Community Line, follows a 14.4-mile (23.2 km) section of Route 1 on Pacific Avenue between Tacoma and Spanaway. The Community Line began service on April 1, 2024, as a limited-stop variant of Route 1 from Tacoma Dome Station to Spanaway that only operates on weekdays. It uses 14 total stops, compared to 58 on Route 1, and runs every 20 minutes on weekdays during peak periods. In March 2026, the Community Line was extended to Commerce Street Station in Downtown Tacoma.

The Community Line was originally planned to have 32 total stations, including curb-side and median stations, and 3.6 miles (5.8 km) of dedicated bus lanes. The project was scheduled to begin construction in 2021 and open by 2024 at a cost of $95 million, with funds from Sound Transit 3 and the federal government. In August 2023, the board of commissioners voted to defer work on the bus rapid transit project due to its six-year delay and $150 million cost increase. In its place, Pierce Transit announced plans to improve Route 1 service on Pacific Avenue in 2024 with an "enhanced" express route that serves 14 stops and uses transit signal priority. The service retains the "Stream Community Line" moniker and a 28-year naming rights sponsorship with health system MultiCare valued at $9.3 million.

Pierce Transit has also studied several four additional routes for future expansion of the Stream bus rapid transit system to serve Lakewood, South Tacoma, and Puyallup. The Puyallup city government proposed its own bus rapid transit line on Meridian Avenue between Puyallup station and South Hill Mall. A long-range plan published in 2025 includes Stream lines on Route 2 and Route 3 that converge in Lakewood and serve Tacoma Community College and Tacoma Mall.

== Facilities ==
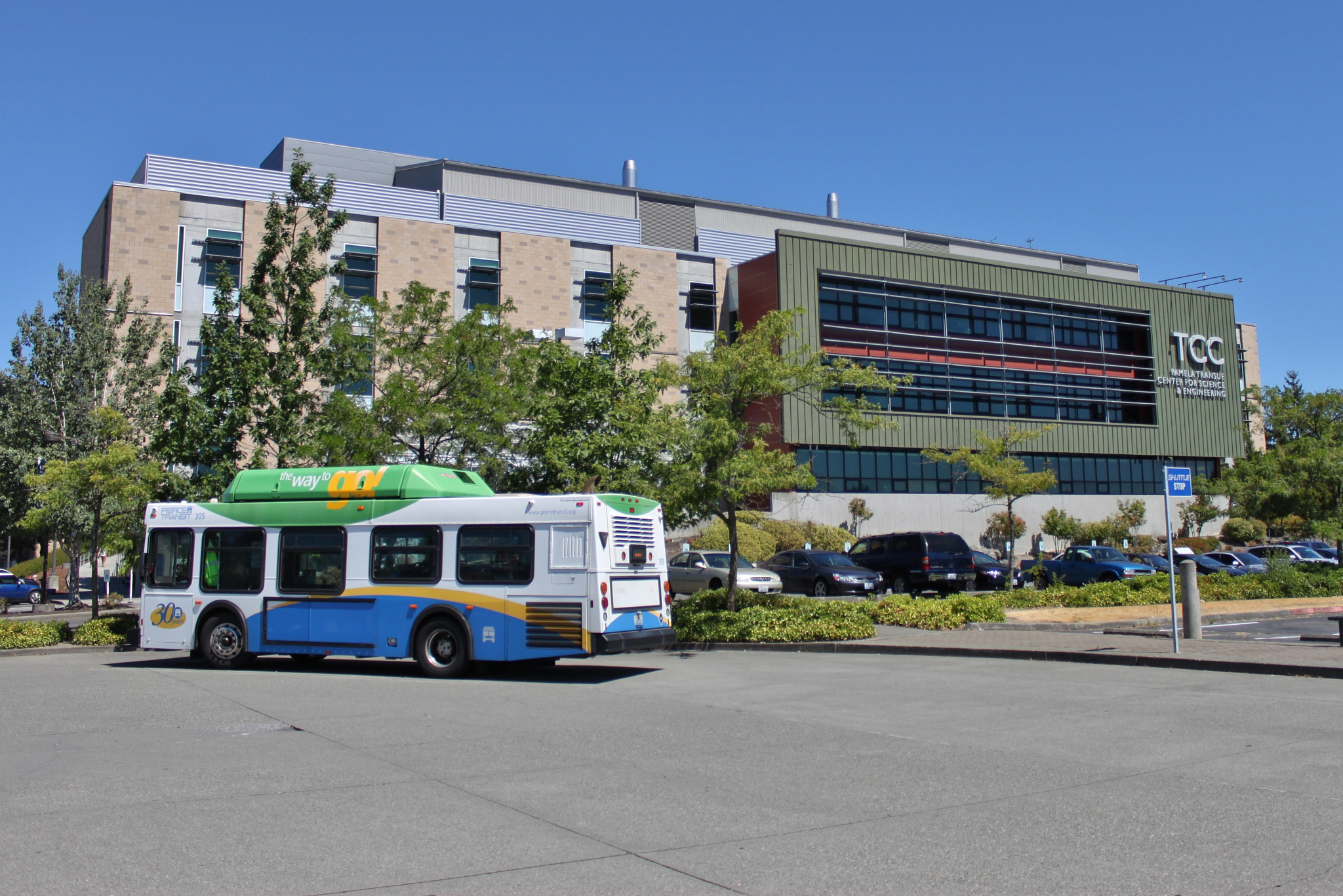
A Pierce Transit bus at Tacoma Community College in 2015

Pierce Transit serves a total of 1,981 bus stops, of which 94 percent are directly managed by the agency. These stops include 547 bus shelters, 950 benches, and 31 bicycle racks. The bus stops are generally furnished with a sign and a paved standing area adjacent to a set of red and yellow markings on the curb; they are generally placed on the far side of intersections, with some exceptions for operational reasons, and spaced 660 to 1,320 feet (200 to 400 m) apart. The agency's headquarters in Lakewood covers 31.5 acres (12.7 ha) and comprises several buildings for administrative offices, operations functions, and a maintenance base for buses. It was built in 1987 and expanded in 2005. The base also has a compressed natural gas fueling station for its buses; in February 2011, an explosion at the station caused no injuries but resulted in temporary service disruptions as buses refueled instead at a Port of Seattle station in SeaTac.

The agency has ten transit centers that function as local and regional hubs with connections to other services, including Sound Transit Express and Intercity Transit. Free park-and-ride lots are provided for commuters at several transit centers as well as 18 standalone sites that are maintained by Pierce Transit or other agencies. The main hub in Downtown Tacoma is Commerce Street Station, which opened in 1993 and was expanded in 2003 to accommodate 1,200 daily bus trips. The station has an indoor layover facility in a cut-and-cover tunnel that allows drivers to turn their buses around. The tunnel is covered by a public plaza on Broadway. Pierce Transit's largest parking facility is at Tacoma Dome Station, a major multimodal hub that is also served by Amtrak and Sounder commuter rail. It has two parking garages with a total of 2,337 stalls that are also used as paid parking during events at the nearby Tacoma Dome. The facility also has a customer service office for Pierce Transit.

Pierce Transit maintains a 300-foot (91 m) radio tower on Indian Hill in Northeast Tacoma near Dash Point State Park. The radio tower is used for communications between the administrative office and vehicles in the service area. It was constructed in 2017 to replace an earlier tower that was 450 feet (140 m) tall.

Pierce Transit hubs
| Name | Location | Bays | Parking | Opened | Connections and notes |
|---|---|---|---|---|---|
| 72nd Street Transit Center | Tacoma | 8 | 68 stalls | 1995 | |
| Commerce Street Station | Tacoma | 7 | —N/a | 1992 | T Line, Sound Transit Express |
| Lakewood Transit Center | Lakewood | 13 | —N/a | 1992 | Sound Transit Express |
| Parkland Transit Center | Parkland | 6 | 62 stalls | 1984 | |
| South Hill Mall Transit Center | Puyallup | 10 | —N/a | 1998 | |
| Spanaway Transit Center | Spanaway | 2 | 38 stalls | 2025 | |
| SR 512 Park and Ride | Lakewood | 9 | 493 stalls | 1988 | Sound Transit Express, Intercity Transit |
| Tacoma Dome Station | Tacoma | 8 | 2,337 stalls | 1997 | Amtrak, Sounder commuter rail, T Line, Sound Transit Express |
| Tacoma Community College Transit Center | Tacoma | 13 | 95 stalls | 1984 | Sound Transit Express |
| Tacoma Mall Transit Center | Tacoma | 11 | —N/a | 1985 | |

== Administration ==
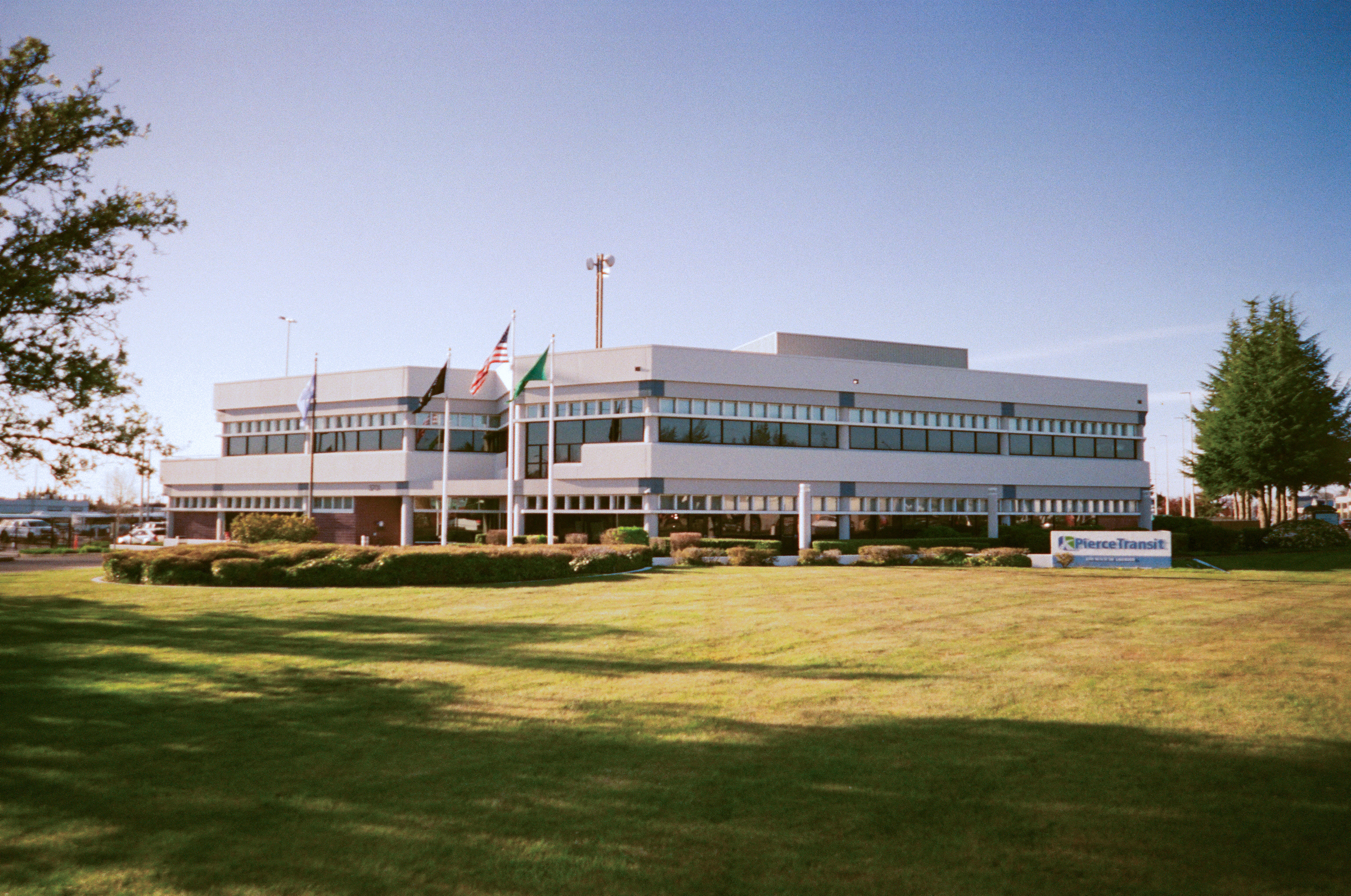
Pierce Transit's headquarters in Lakewood, Washington

Pierce Transit operates within a public transportation benefit area (PTBA) that covers 292 square miles (760 km^{2}) and comprises most populated areas of the county. The PTBA had an estimated population of 608,522 residents in 2024. The agency has a Board of Commissioners with nine elected officials from throughout the county and one non-voting member from a labor union. The board has three voting seats for representatives from Tacoma, two seats for members of the Pierce County Council, and four seats for other municipalities on a rotating basis.

The chief executive officer is appointed by the board; since 2021, this position has been held by Mike Griffus. As of 2026, Pierce Transit has 967 staff positions, of which 63 percent are in service delivery and support or are transit operators. Some of the paratransit services are contracted out to Transdev while Runner microtransit is operated by Via Transportation. The agency has $225 million in budgeted operating revenue for 2026, of which 52 percent is derived from a 0.6 percent sales tax levied within the PTBA. Another 29 percent is provided through a contract with Sound Transit to operate commuter routes in Pierce County as well as southern King County.

=== Police and security ===
The agency has a contract with the Pierce County Sheriff's Department to provide policing and emergency services onboard buses and at transit facilities. They are led by a chief, a sergeant patrol supervisor from the Sheriff's Department; the team also includes 17 peace officers that do not carry firearms and security guards from a contracted firm. Pierce Transit's contract with the Sheriff's Department began in 2007 and was temporarily left unrenewed in 2021 due to staffing shortages and a public dispute over the use of thin blue line stickers on patrol cars.

== Fleet ==
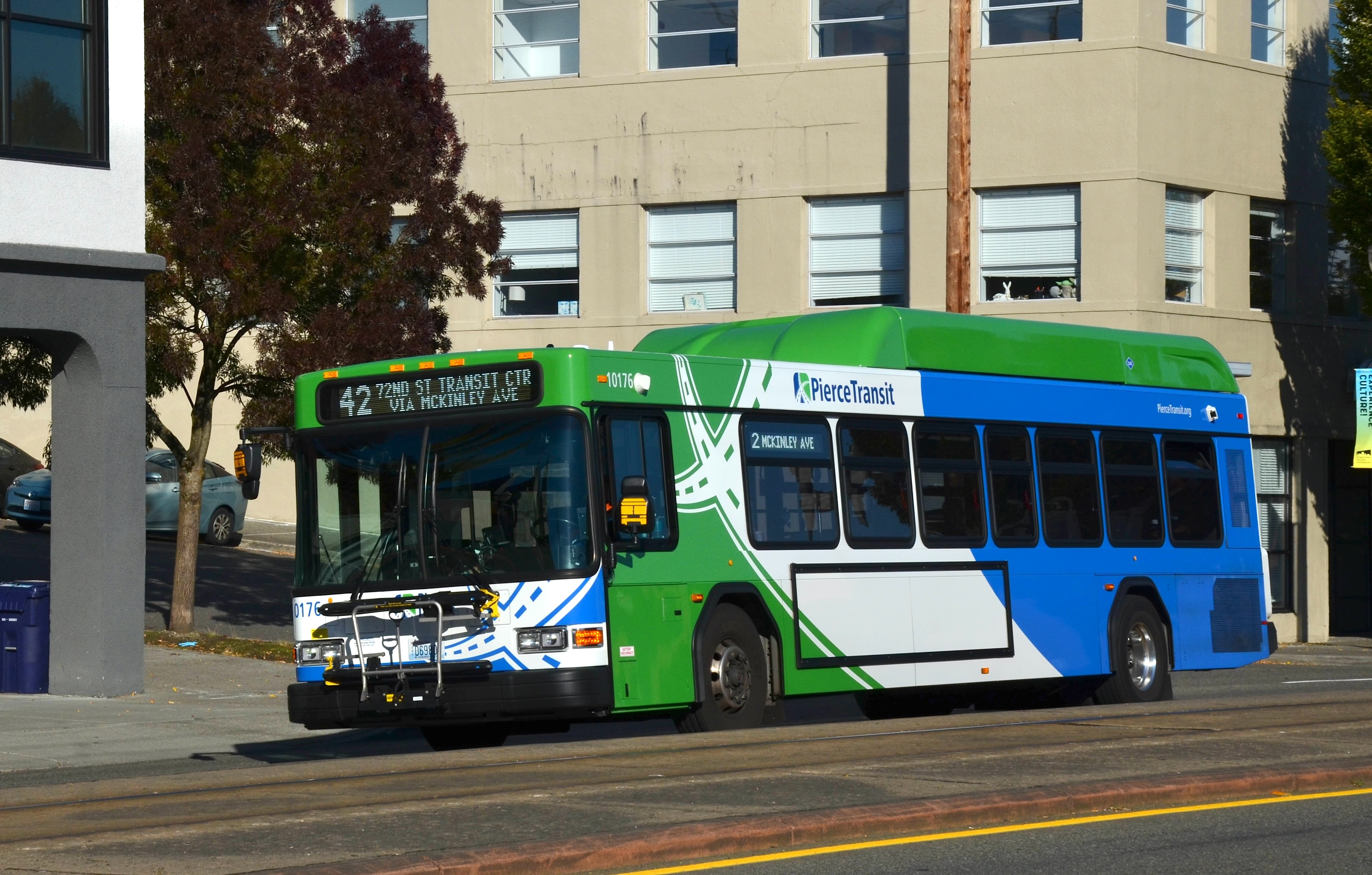
A CNG-powered bus in the modern Pierce Transit livery

As of August 2026, the agency has 168 total fixed-route buses, 110 cutaway vans for paratransit, 298 vanpool vehicles, and 128 non-revenue vehicles. The bus fleet is primarily the 40-foot (12 m) model of the Gillig Low Floor and several cutaway buses. About 81 percent of the buses use compressed natural gas as their fuel source, while others are electric hybrids or solely use electric batteries.

Pierce Transit began experimenting with compressed natural gas as a fuel source for its bus fleet in the 1980s by modifying two existing buses, becoming the first agency in the nation to do so. By 2018, 118 of the 249 buses in the agency's fleet ran on compressed natural gas, while other models were primarily diesel–electric hybrids. The compressed natural gas is delivered through a pipeline by Puget Sound Energy, which sources its supply from Enbridge in Canada. The first battery electric buses in the Pierce Transit fleet were three Proterra Catalyst E2s that debuted in October 2018 and were acquired with a $2.55 million grant from the Federal Transit Administration. The agency purchased additional battery electric buses and charging equipment for its maintenance base in 2024; it plans to have a fully electrified bus fleet by 2042. The first charging station at a transit center is planned for Tacoma Community College and was funded by a $14.8 million federal grant that was awarded in 2024.

The agency also maintains a historic Twin Coach bus, manufactured in 1948 by Fageol for the Tacoma Transit Company, for use in events. It was restored by Pierce Transit beginning in 2005 using parts acquired from various sources.

== See also ==
- Steilacoom–Anderson Island ferry
