= Tacoma Station =

Tacoma Station may refer to:

- Tacoma Dome Station, a train station in Tacoma, Washington, used by Amtrak, commuter rail, and light rail
- Tacoma station (1984), a former Amtrak station in Tacoma, Washington, opened in 1984
- Union Station (Tacoma, Washington), a former train station that closed in 1984
- Tacoma station (Milwaukee Road), a former Milwaukee Road train station

== See also ==
- Tacoma Link
- Takoma (WMATA station)
- Tecoma railway station, Victoria, Australia
