= Centennial Station =

Train station in Lacey, Washington, US

Olympia–Lacey, WA
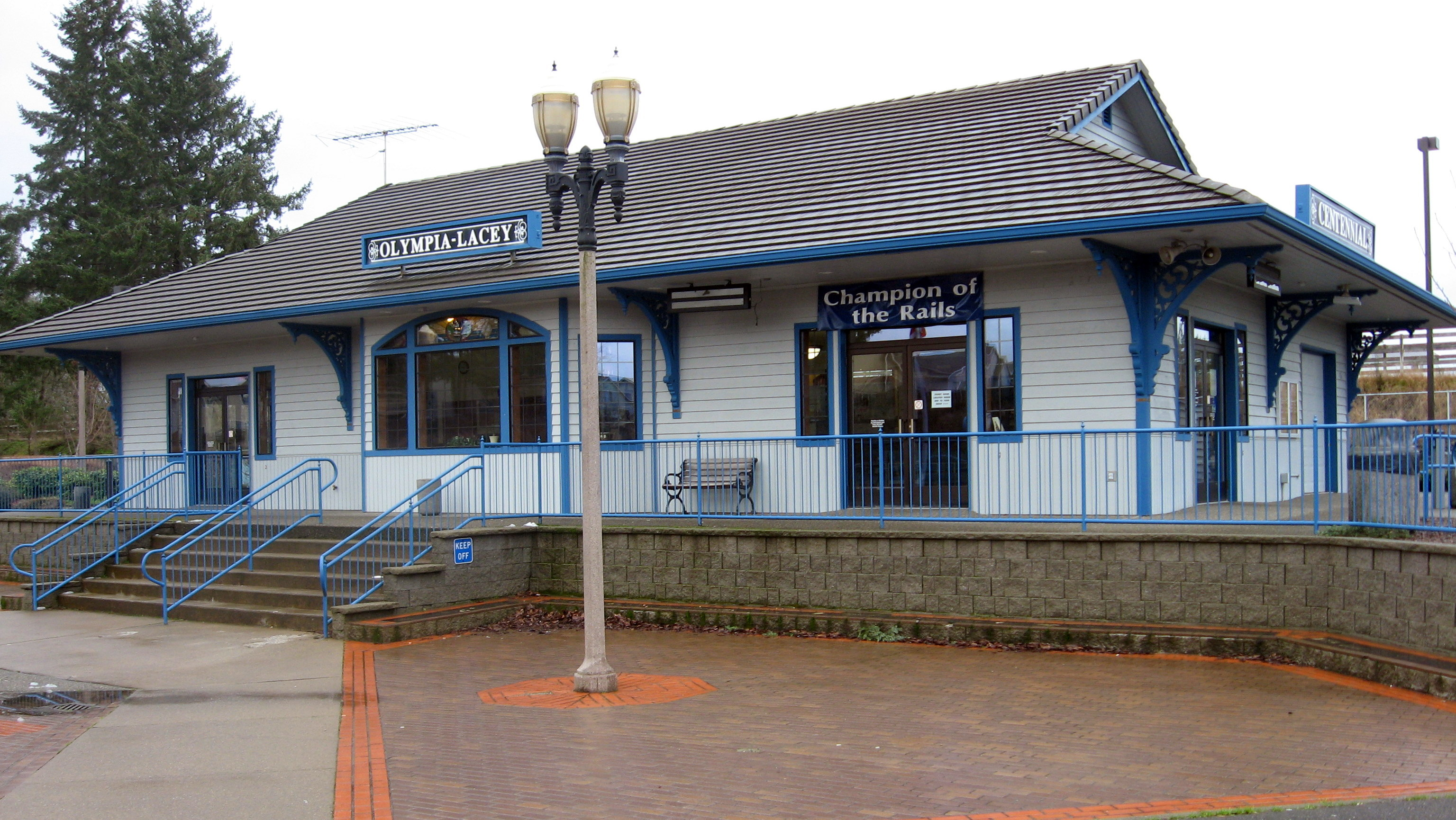
- Station house at Centennial Station

General information
- Location: 6600 Yelm Highway SE; Lacey, Washington; United States
- Coordinates: 46.99145°N 122.79403°W
- Owner: BNSF Railway and Intercity Transit
- Line: BNSF Seattle Subdivision
- Platforms: 1 side platform
- Tracks: 2
- Connections: Intercity Transit

Construction
- Parking: Yes
- Accessible: Yes

Other information
- Station code: Amtrak: OLW

History
- Opened: October 28, 1990; 36 years ago

Passengers
- FY 2025: 82,519 (Amtrak)

Services
Preceding station	Amtrak	Following station
Centralia toward Eugene	Amtrak Cascades	Tacoma Dome toward Vancouver, British Columbia
Centralia toward Los Angeles	Coast Starlight	Tacoma Dome toward Seattle
Former services
Preceding station	Amtrak	Following station
Centralia toward Los Angeles	Coast Starlight	Tacoma toward Seattle
Centralia toward Eugene	Amtrak Cascades	Tacoma toward Vancouver, British Columbia
Tacoma toward Seattle	Pioneer Discontinued in 1997	Centralia toward Chicago
Joint Great Northern/Northern Pacific/ Union Pacific service at East Olympia
Preceding station	Great Northern Railway	Following station
Plumb toward Portland	Portland–Seattle Line	Kyro toward Seattle
Preceding station	Northern Pacific Railway	Following station
Plumb toward Portland	Portland–Seattle Line	Kryo toward Seattle
Preceding station	Union Pacific Railroad	Following station
Plumb toward Portland	Portland–Seattle Line	Kryo toward Seattle
Location

The Centennial Station (also known as Olympia–Lacey) is a train station located immediately south of Lacey, Washington, United States, that also serves the capital city of Olympia. The station is served by Amtrak's (the National Railroad Passenger Corporation) Cascades and Coast Starlight.

Local transit connections are provided by Intercity Transit, which operates two routes with connections to transit hubs in Olympia, Lacey, and Yelm. The agency also assumes some operating and maintenance duties at the station, which is otherwise staffed by volunteers. Funding is provided by Amtrak and seven local jurisdictions, including Thurston County, Intercity Transit, the Port of Olympia, and nearby city governments.

== History ==
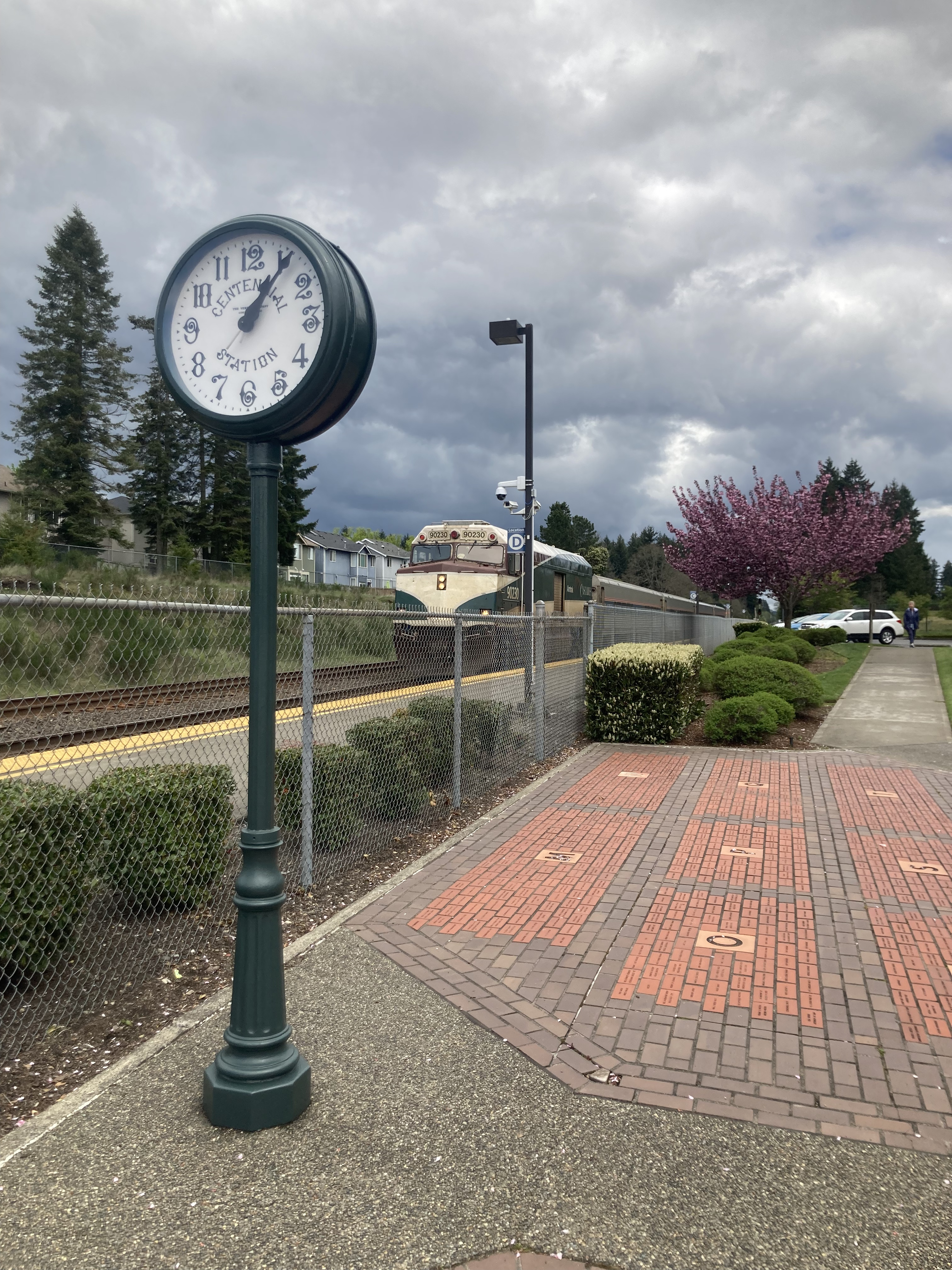
Station clock with approaching Amtrak Cascades

The Union Pacific Railroad opened its East Olympia depot (originally named Chambers Prairie) on January 16, 1916, as part of a new Tacoma–Portland main line that was shared with the Northern Pacific and Great Northern. Northern Pacific also had a station at Kyro, approximately 2 miles (3.2 km) northeast of the current station. Olympia had been bypassed by earlier railroads in favor of a more direct route between Tacoma and Portland, as well as property deed issues after the death of a local agent for a major landowner. A branch line from Tenino was instead constructed by local residents in to serve the city until a new Northern Pacific line opened in 1891. The Chambers Prairie depot was renamed to East Olympia station on July 1, 1933, and plans to launch a bus between the depot and downtown Olympia were announced.

The depot deteriorated over the next decade and, by 1944, had its windows boarded up and lacked a station agent. The last bus shuttle to downtown Olympia ceased operations on February 1, 1968, after Union Pacific canceled its contract with a local operator. A public payphone was installed in the waiting room shortly after the bus shuttle's discontinuation; the station's waiting room remained without reliable heat and a restroom, instead using an outhouse. Amtrak trains during the 1970s and 1980s used a wooden shelter as East Olympia's passenger train station instead of the depot. However, the station site was remote and had no public transport, no lighting and a pot-holed gravel parking lot with a public telephone that rarely worked.

A new Amtrak station to replace East Olympia was proposed in the late 1980s, to be located on county-owned land facing the Yelm Highway. Centennial Station opened on October 28, 1990, with temporary lighting for the 800-foot-long (240 m) platform and portable toilets, as well as a 36-space parking lot. The first phase of the project—installing permanent lighting and landscaping—was completed in December at a cost of $385,000. A 60 percent increase in ridership was reported for that month, with over 2,000 passengers using Centennial Station compared to 1,302 in December 1989 at the former East Olympia stop.

The station's depot was built by the non-profit Amtrak Depot Committee, which began raising funds in 1987 and aimed to open a permanent station in time for the state centennial in 1989. The committee raised $500,000 through government grants, business contributions, individual donations, and the sale of engraved bricks that were later laid in the station plaza. Centennial Station's depot and waiting area opened to the public on May 1, 1993, following the delayed installation of a sewer system.

It is believed to be the only Amtrak station in the nation both built and operated entirely by volunteers. The train station was sold to Intercity Transit for $1 in September 1993, while the Amtrak Depot Committee remained the main operators of the facility. The committee also raised $10,000 to install a 10-foot-tall (3.0 m) clocktower in the courtyard, which was dedicated on November 14, 1994, as part of a ceremony for the Talgo trainsets entering service on the Seattle–Portland corridor. Despite early proposals to bypass the Olympia area in favor of a shorter route via Roy, Amtrak's rebranded Cascades service with Talgo trainsets debuted at the station in 1999. The station's parking lot was expanded to 133 stalls as part of an improvement project that was completed in 2001. A second improvement project, completed in 2003, included a rebuilt train platform for accessibility and the installation of an electronic information kiosk.

The station is owned by Intercity Transit, who contributed towards the operation and maintenance costs alongside Amtrak, the Thurston County government, Port of Olympia, and four local cities. The Olympia city government withdrew from the agreement in 2011 due to cuts in their budget. The staffing of Centennial Station remained the responsibility of a volunteers' committee that had a waiting list beyond its 50 filled positions. A new maintenance and funding agreement was signed on January 1, 2014, with Olympia funding a portion.
