= Kent station (Sound Transit) =

Commuter train station in Kent, Washington

Kent
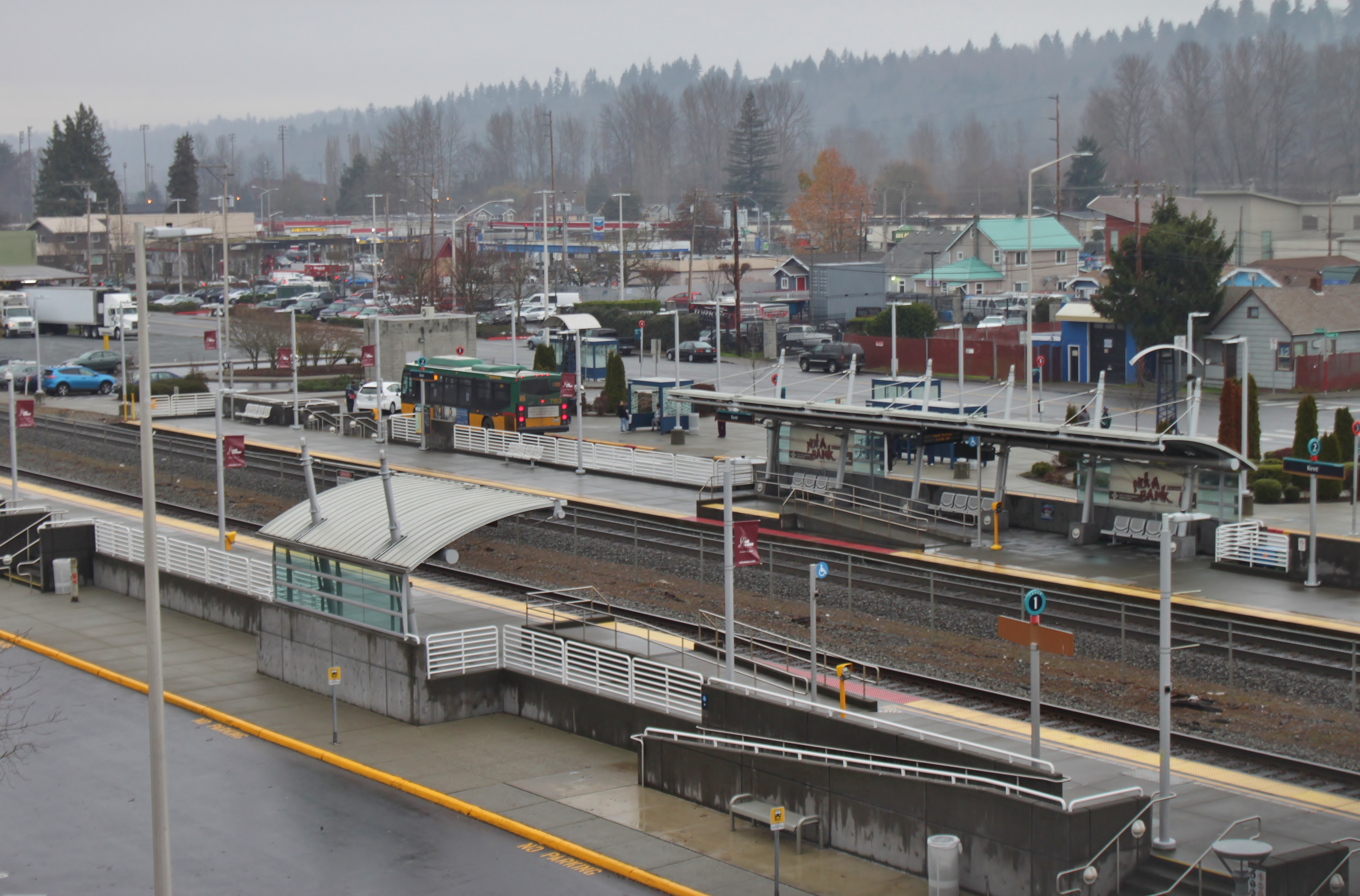
- Train platforms and bus bays at Kent station

General information
- Location: 301 Railroad Avenue North; Kent, Washington; United States
- Coordinates: 47°23′03″N 122°13′59″W
- Owner: Sound Transit
- Line: BNSF Railway Seattle Subdivision
- Platforms: 2 side platforms
- Tracks: 2
- Connections: King County Metro, Sound Transit Express

Construction
- Structure type: At-grade
- Parking: 996 parking spaces
- Cycle facilities: Bicycle lockers and racks
- Accessible: Yes

History
- Opened: February 5, 2001

Passengers
- 397 daily weekday boardings (2025); 100,817 total boardings (2025)

Services
Preceding station	Sound Transit	Following station
Sounder
Auburn toward Lakewood	S Line	Tukwila toward Seattle
Former services
Preceding station	Great Northern Railway	Following station
Auburn toward Portland	Portland–Seattle Line	Seattle Terminus
Preceding station	Northern Pacific Railway	Following station
Seattle Terminus	Main Line	Auburn toward St. Paul
Auburn toward Portland	Portland–Seattle Line	Seattle Terminus
Location

Kent station is a train station in the city of Kent, Washington, United States, served by the S Line of the Sounder commuter rail network. It is located in downtown Kent and consists of two train platforms connected via a pedestrian overpass, a parking garage, and several bus bays. The station also has 996 parking stalls and is served by King County Metro and Sound Transit Express buses. Train service to Kent began in 2001 and the station's garage opened the following year. King County Metro began service from the bus bays in 2005, after a third phase of construction. Sound Transit plans to build a second parking garage in 2027 to accommodate additional demand at the station.

== Description ==
Kent station is located in the northern part of downtown Kent, one block west of Central Avenue at the intersection of Smith Street and Railroad Avenue. It is located adjacent to the Kent Station shopping center, which includes a movie theater and auxiliary campus for Green River College. To the northwest is the city-run ShoWare Center arena and the county's Maleng Regional Justice Center. The area around the station consists primarily of commercial and office spaces, with some multifamily residential buildings.

The station consists of two side platforms that run between 1st Avenue to the west and Railroad Avenue to the east. The east platform includes a transit center with several bus bays arranged on a center island. To the southeast is a small plaza that leads to Burlington Green, a park along the railroad tracks between Smith and Meeker streets.

Kent station has a total of 996 parking spaces, divided between a parking garage and two small surface lots. The five-story parking garage, located southwest along Smith Street, holds 877 vehicles and includes a pedestrian overpass connecting it to both of the platforms. An auxiliary park and ride lot on James Street holds an additional 713 vehicles. The garage and plaza also house Cornucopia by Lydia Aldredge, a public art installation commissioned by Sound Transit and the city government that consists of several sculptures referencing Kent's agricultural history. These pieces include glass tile mosaics resembling a river, a "garden of measurement" with weather station tools, several trellises, and a clock shaped like a train whistle.

== History ==
=== Predecessors and planning ===
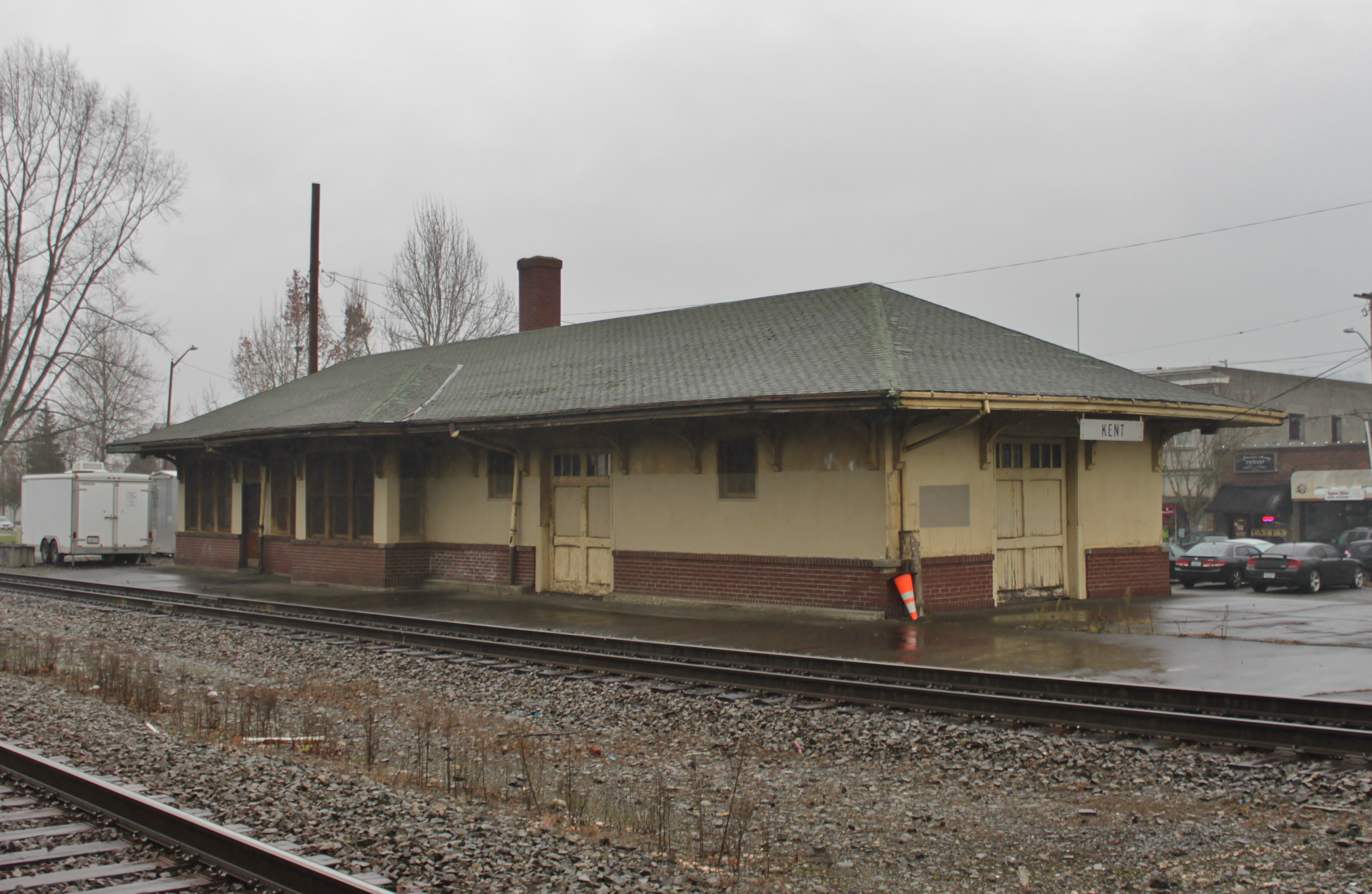
The historic Northern Pacific Railway depot, located two blocks south of the modern Kent station

Kent's first staffed train station was opened in October 1889 as part of the Puget Sound Shore Railroad, a subsidiary of the Northern Pacific Railway. The town was originally called Titusville but renamed itself after the English county of Kent, reflecting a shared dependence on the hops industry, after receiving the train station. Days after Kent's depot was opened, two would-be robbers were injured by the station agent using an iron poker. The depot was replaced in 1893 by a larger brick building, which was renovated extensively in 1927 and served passenger trains until the 1950s. It was used by the Burlington Northern Railroad (later BNSF Railway) as a maintenance shed and still stands two blocks south of the Sounder platforms. The city government proposed re-using the depot as a railroad museum or a downtown transit center in the 1980s, but neither were pursued.

In the late 1980s, officials in King County proposed a modern commuter rail system running 22 miles (35 km) between King Street Station in Downtown Seattle and Auburn, including a single stop in Kent. The city government produced a shortlist of three sites for the commuter rail station: at James Street in downtown, near a Boeing facility 2 miles (3.2 km) north of downtown, or the disused Burlington Northern depot. Although the Burlington Northern depot was favored by the mayor, Metro Transit selected the downtown Kent site at James Street for inclusion in the 1993 regional transit plan, intended to serve as a framework for a future ballot measure. The city government began preparing for a major redevelopment of areas around the future station in hopes of revitalizing the downtown area.

Ahead of a scheduled ballot measure to fund a regional transit system, including the Seattle–Tacoma commuter rail line, Kent was selected as a stop for a demonstration commuter rail service in February 1995. The temporary station, located between Meeker and Smith streets in downtown Kent, was served by daily trains to Tacoma and Seattle during peak periods and event trains for baseball and basketball games. The March 1995 ballot measure was rejected by voters, but a modified plan was approved in November 1996, including funds for a commuter rail system managed by Sound Transit.

Sound Transit's environmental assessment for the Seattle–Tacoma commuter rail project identified two potential sites for the station in downtown Kent, approximately 900 feet (270 m) apart: a northern site between James and Smith streets, and a southern site between Gowe and Willis streets adjacent to the historic depot. The debate over the station's location took months to settle, with Sound Transit and the mayor favoring the northern site because of its proximity to two major arterial streets serving the city's suburban neighborhood and the Kent city council recommending the southern site to promote downtown commerce and avoid property acquisition. In June 1998, the Sound Transit board selected the northern site with a promise to design the station in a way that would minimize the amount of property to be acquired, replacing a surface parking lot with a parking garage that would be partially funded using $4 million in city-issued bonds.

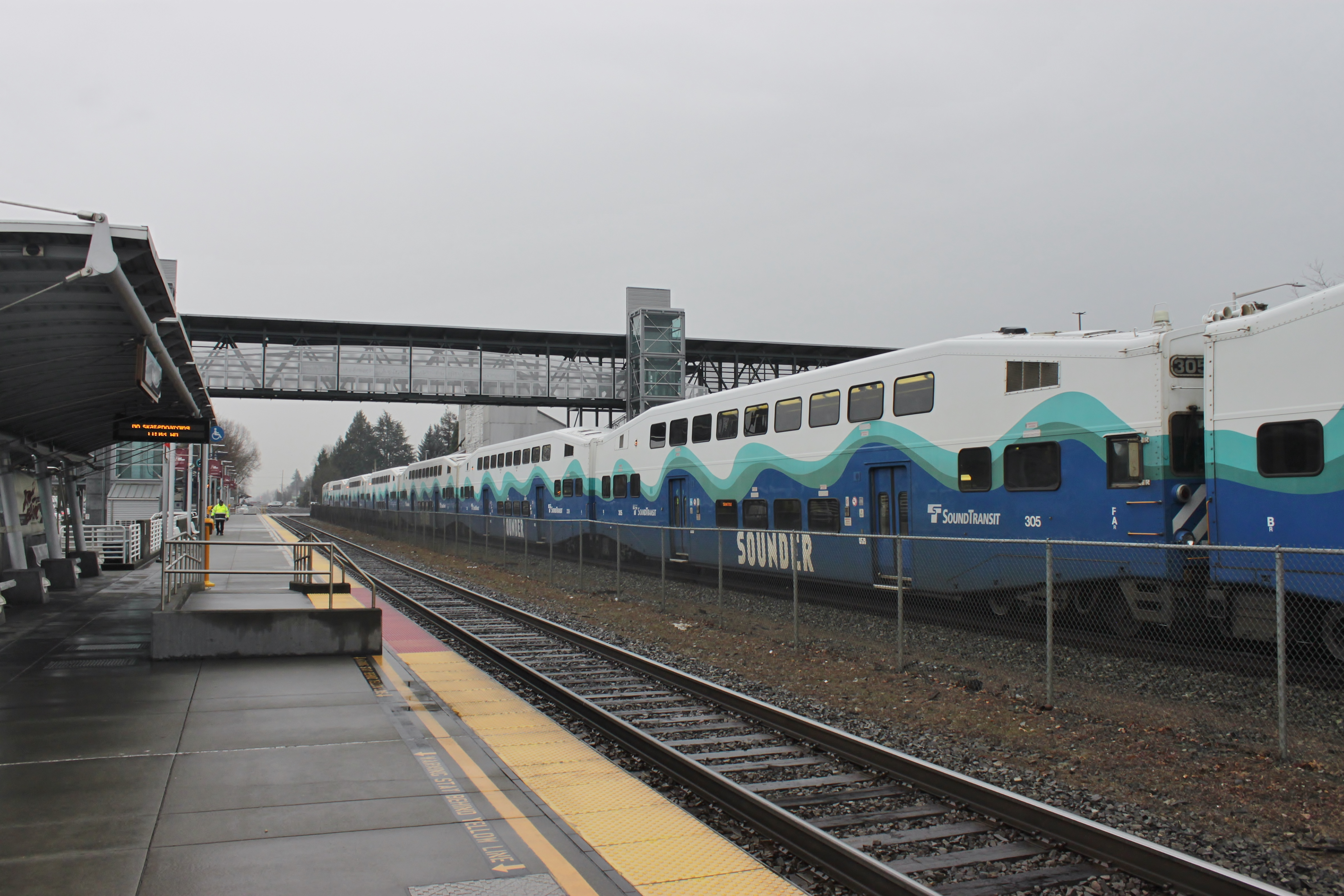
A northbound Sounder train towards Seattle King Street at Kent station

The budget for Kent station was originally set at $12 million, but was increased to $25 million in July 1999 to accommodate the proposed 680-stall parking garage. The station and garage site was occupied by a feed mill and hardware store, which were relocated after settling a condemnation lawsuit with Sound Transit for $1.85 million the following month. Gary Merlino Construction was awarded a $3.66 million contract to construct the station, leaving the garage and bus station to be completed in later project phases. Groundbreaking on Kent station was celebrated on October 20, 1999.

=== Opening and expansion ===
Kent station was dedicated by Sound Transit and local officials on February 3, 2001, and service began two days later on February 5. 200 people rode trains from Kent on the opening day, which also marked the beginning of service from Puyallup station. The second phase of construction, including the $10 million parking garage, pedestrian bridge, and bus bays, began in 2000 and was completed three months ahead of schedule in March 2002. King County Metro opened a new transit center at Kent station's completed bus bays in June 2005, replacing a park and ride northwest of downtown on James Street. The city government opened the Kent Station shopping center and mixed-use development in late 2005, using $16 million to cleanup 20 acres (8.1 ha) of a former resin chemical plant adjacent to the commuter rail station.

The parking garage and surface lots at Kent station are used by 51 percent of the station's 1,900 daily riders and reach capacity early in the morning. The Sound Transit 2 plan, approved by voters in 2008, allocated $35 million for a second parking garage at Kent station, but planning was suspended in 2010 due to a decline in sales tax revenue. The project was revived in 2016 and expanded to also include pedestrian and bicycle improvements in the vicinity of the station. A shortlist of four sites for the 450-stall parking garage was drafted by Sound Transit and the city government in March 2017, including a proposal for Kaibara Park that was withdrawn after it was discovered that the property was owned by BNSF Railway and leased to the city. The remaining three sites were located to the north of the station along James Street at its railroad crossing.

A site on the south side of James Street and east of Railroad Avenue was chosen by Sound Transit in November 2017 as the preferred site for the garage, following a recommendation from the city government. The parking garage was originally scheduled to open in 2023, but was later postponed to 2027 due to longer planning times and funding issues caused by the COVID-19 pandemic. The project originally had a budget of $35 million, but increased to $65 million after corrections based on similar garage projects at other Sounder stations as well as rising costs for real estate and contractors. The increase in costs, which reached $100,000 per parking stall, was criticized by the local Sierra Club, but defended by officials in Kent as a preventive measure against "hide-and-ride" parking by commuters in local neighborhoods. The proposed garage's construction would also require the realignment of Railroad Avenue, which the city government claimed would jeopardize the planned expansion of bus service to the station. Demolition of three buildings on the garage site began in August 2024. Construction of the 400-stall garage and a new bus layover facility with electric chargers began in October 2024.

== Services ==
Kent station is served by 13 daily round-trips on the Sounder S Line, which travel north to King Street Station in Downtown Seattle and south to Tacoma Dome Station or Lakewood station on weekdays. Sounder trains travel from Kent to Seattle in approximately 27 minutes and to Tacoma in 35 minutes. The station is also a major transit hub for King County Metro and Sound Transit Express, with nine bus bays served by several routes. Sound Transit Express routes 566 and 567 travel from the station to Auburn station, Renton, Downtown Bellevue, and Overlake Transit Center during peak periods. King County Metro operates all-day service from the station to eastern Kent, Tukwila, Downtown Seattle, Renton, Auburn, Maple Valley, Federal Way, SeaTac, Burien. The agency also has peak-only service to Downtown Seattle via Interstate 5 and the Boeing Everett Factory. In additional to traditional bus service, Metro provides dial-a-ride service to eastern Kent and areas northwest of downtown Kent.
