= Tukwila station =

Amtrak and commuter train station in Tukwila, Washington

Tukwila
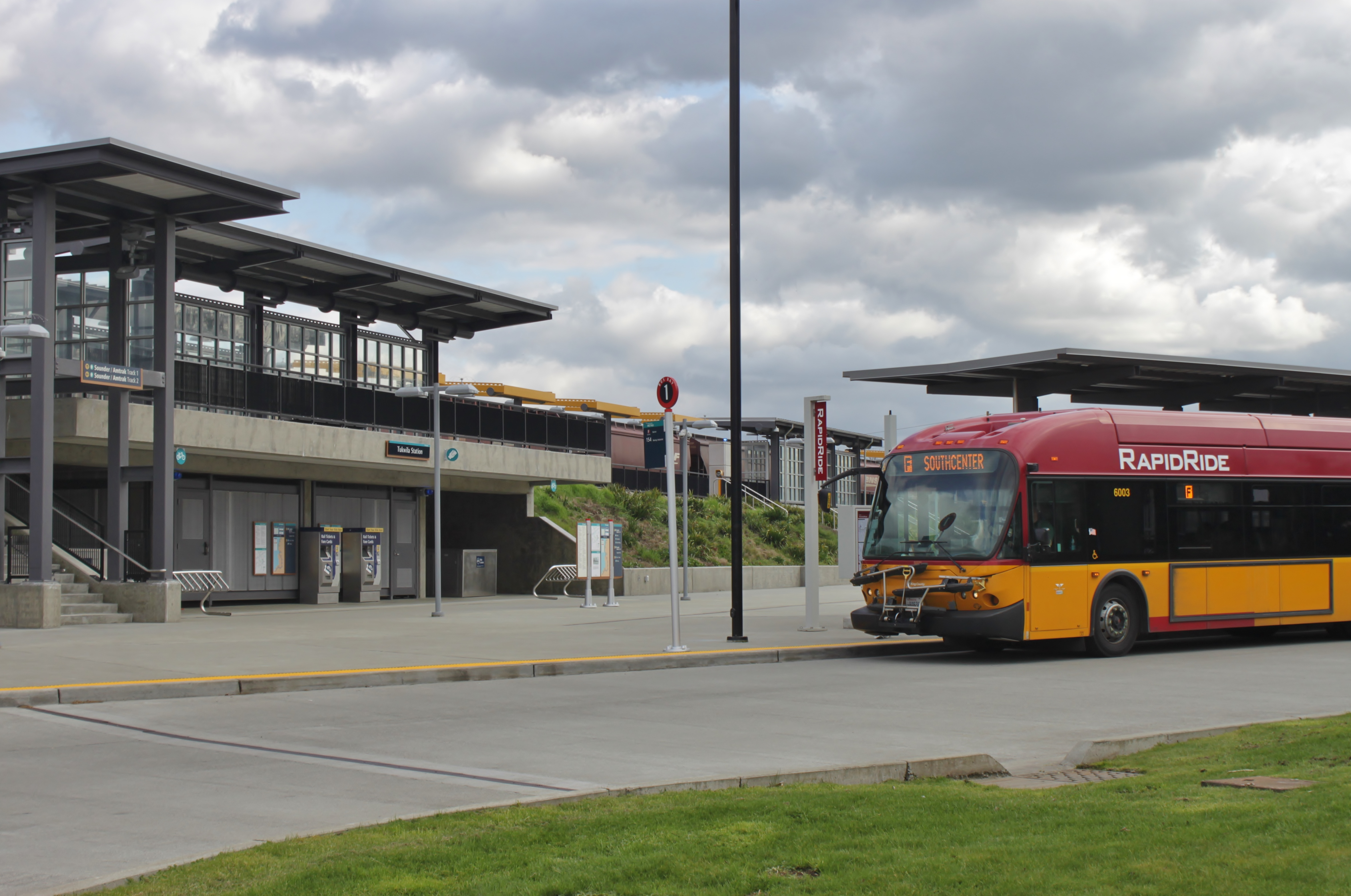
- Bus bay and plaza at Tukwila station

General information
- Location: 7301 Longacres Way; Tukwila, Washington; United States
- Coordinates: 47°27′38″N 122°14′26″W
- Owner: Sound Transit
- Line: BNSF Seattle Subdivision
- Platforms: 2 side platforms
- Tracks: 3
- Connections: King County Metro

Construction
- Structure type: Elevated
- Parking: 390 spaces
- Cycle facilities: Racks and lockers
- Accessible: Yes

Other information
- Station code: Amtrak: TUK

History
- Opened: March 12, 2001
- Rebuilt: 2013–2015

Passengers
- 48,064 total boardings (Amtrak, FY 2025); 20,904 total boardings (Sounder, 2025)

Services
Preceding station	Amtrak	Following station
Tacoma Dome toward Eugene	Amtrak Cascades	Seattle toward Vancouver, British Columbia
Coast Starlight does not stop here
Preceding station	Sound Transit	Following station
Sounder
Kent toward Lakewood	S Line	Seattle Terminus
Former services
Preceding station	Amtrak	Following station
Tacoma toward Eugene	Amtrak Cascades	Seattle toward Vancouver, British Columbia
Location

Tukwila station is a train station in Tukwila, Washington, United States. The station was built by Sound Transit to serve its Sounder commuter rail service on the S Line, as well as Amtrak's intercity Cascades line. It includes 390 parking spaces and a bus platform served by King County Metro's RapidRide F Line and other routes.

Tukwila station was approved for construction in 1996 and an interim station opened on March 12, 2001, using temporary platforms and a leased parking lot. Construction of a permanent station was delayed until additional funding was found and further design work was completed. The $46 million project was approved by the federal government in 2011 and began construction in 2013. It was dedicated on February 18, 2015, featuring new platforms, additional parking, bicycle amenities, and public art.

== Description ==
Tukwila station consists of two 600-foot-long (183 m) side platforms on an embanked, triple-tracked segment of the BNSF Seattle Subdivision. The platforms have several covered shelters and are connected to ground level by stairs and ramps that lead towards a pedestrian underpass along Longacres Way at the north end of the station. The station's ticket vending machines, bike lockers, and bus bays are located in a plaza west of the platforms. The plaza also includes a piece of public art, Sheila Klein's sculpture and garden Imaginary Landscape, located at the station's ancillary building. It consists of planted red-twig dogwood shrubs, painted steel panels, and a steel "crown" atop the building.

A 390-stall park and ride lot is located south of the plaza and includes four electric vehicle charging stations. The lot includes 40 parking spaces for Amtrak passengers, divided between short-term and long-term use, and reserved spaces for carpool vehicles, available for a monthly fee of $5. The station is accessed from the north via Longacres Way, connecting to Interstate 405 and the Southcenter Mall. The City of Tukwila has prepared the area around the station for transit-oriented development and plans to build a multi-use trail between Longacres Way and the Southcenter Mall. Southwest 27th Street travels south and east from the station to Boeing's Longacres Industrial Park, the Federal Reserve Bank, and offices for Kaiser Permanente. An undeveloped area north of the station was proposed in 2015 as the site of an indoor arena for a major-league basketball or hockey team.

== History ==
=== Early stations ===
The Puget Sound Shore Railroad, a branch of the Northern Pacific Railway, built the first railroad between Seattle and Tacoma in 1884, traveling through modern-day Tukwila on the current BNSF Seattle Subdivision. The railroad was sparsely used during its early years, earning the title "Orphan Road", but had several daily passenger trains stopping at Black River Junction (near Fort Dent) and Orillia (south of modern-day Tukwila station). An interurban railway, the Puget Sound Electric Railway, was built parallel to the Northern Pacific route in the Green River Valley in 1902. It connected Orillia to Tacoma and Seattle until it ceased operations in 1928. The tracks were removed and replaced in the 1980s by the Interurban Trail, a bicycle and pedestrian trail that runs from Tukwila to Pierce County.

The Longacres horse racetrack was built in 1933 to the northeast of Orillia, adjacent to the Northern Pacific tracks and the modern-day Tukwila station. The 215-acre (87 ha) racetrack site was targeted for redevelopment into offices by the City of Renton in the 1980s and acquired by the Boeing Company in 1990. Horse racing at Longacres ended in 1992 and construction of Boeing's Commercial Airplane Group headquarters began on the site in 1997. In 1991, Metro Transit recommended the Longacres redevelopment site as a station on a potential commuter rail line between Seattle and Tacoma.

=== Temporary commuter rail station ===
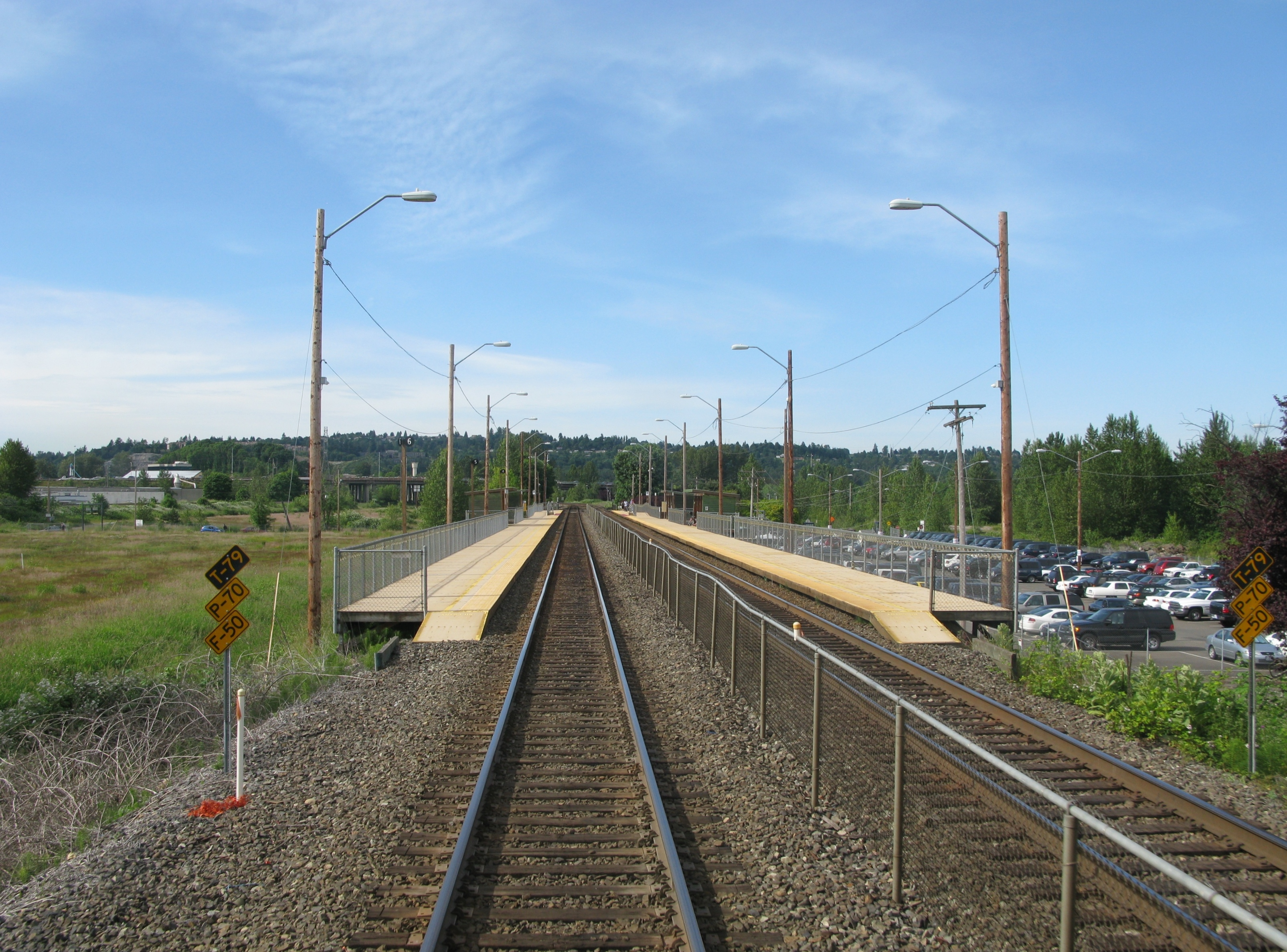
The interim platforms at Tukwila station, pictured from the tracks in 2008

The 1993 regional transit plan developed by the Regional Transit Authority (RTA; later Sound Transit) recommended Longacres as the transfer station between the north–south commuter rail line and a light rail line serving the Interstate 405 corridor. The RTA's March 1995 ballot measure included a Tukwila station for the Seattle–Tacoma commuter rail line, but was rejected by voters. A smaller version of the regional transit plan was re-submitted in November 1996 and approved by voters, allocating $13 million (equivalent to $24.6 million in 2025 dollars) in provisional funding for a commuter rail station at the Longacres site in Tukwila. The station would include two covered platforms, a bus station, bicycle lockers, and 800 to 1,000 parking spaces. The Tukwila station was also selected by Amtrak as a Cascades stop in January 1998, intended to serve all of southern King County as the lone stop between Seattle and Tacoma.

Sound Transit selected the Longacres site as its preferred station location for Tukwila on March 12, 1998, and approved the purchase of 13.8 acres (5.6 ha) from Boeing for the station in September. After receiving six design proposals for Tukwila station, Sound Transit selected MBT Architecture to lead the preliminary design team and later the final design team. Final design was suspended in early 1999 at the request of the Tukwila city council, who were seeking transit-oriented development proposals for the Longacres area from private developers. Construction of the full station was postponed in November 2000, and construction of an $587,000 interim station began immediately. The cost of the station was increased to $796,000 as a result of the rushed bidding and design process, which lasted five days and omitted a survey of underground utilities.

The interim Tukwila station opened on March 12, 2001, built with wooden platforms, chain-link fencing, and 250 parking spaces in the former Longacres lot on lease from Boeing. Tukwila was the seventh Sounder station to open, and was initially expected to open in September 2001; the opening date was moved up to February to coincide with the opening of stations in Kent and Puyallup, but delayed to complete additional construction. Amtrak began Cascades service to Tukwila on June 1, 2001, after contributing $1 million for the temporary station's construction. Sound Transit signed an agreement in 2002 to delay design work on the permanent station for up to ten years while the City of Tukwila revised its development plans and the City of Renton completed design of the Strander Boulevard crossing to the south of the station.

=== Permanent station ===
Alternatives analysis and preliminary engineering work for the permanent station was authorized by the Sound Transit Board in 2005. The remaining funds from the 1996 ballot measure were used to complete design work and real estate acquisition, but construction would need to be funded separately. Construction of a permanent Tukwila station with up to 400 parking spaces was included in the Roads and Transit ballot measure, which was rejected by voters in November 2007. The permanent station was part of the standalone Sound Transit 2 measure, which was approved by voters in November 2008.

Sound Transit completed 30 percent design and an environmental assessment of the project in January 2009, proposing a station with platforms 700 feet (210 m) south of Longacres Way, and the Federal Transit Administration (FTA) published a Finding of No Significant Impact in March. The south end of the new platforms would have conflicted with construction of the City of Renton's Strander Boulevard extension and delayed construction until late 2012; in response, Sound Transit moved the permanent station platforms north to the site of the temporary station and extended the final design phase of the project. The FTA and Federal Railroad Administration (FRA) approved the reevaluated design in 2011 and found no significantly different environmental impacts for the northern platforms. The $46 million project received $14.2 million in federal grants, including $4.6 million from the American Recovery and Reinvestment Act and $8 million from the FRA's High-Speed Intercity Passenger Rail Program.

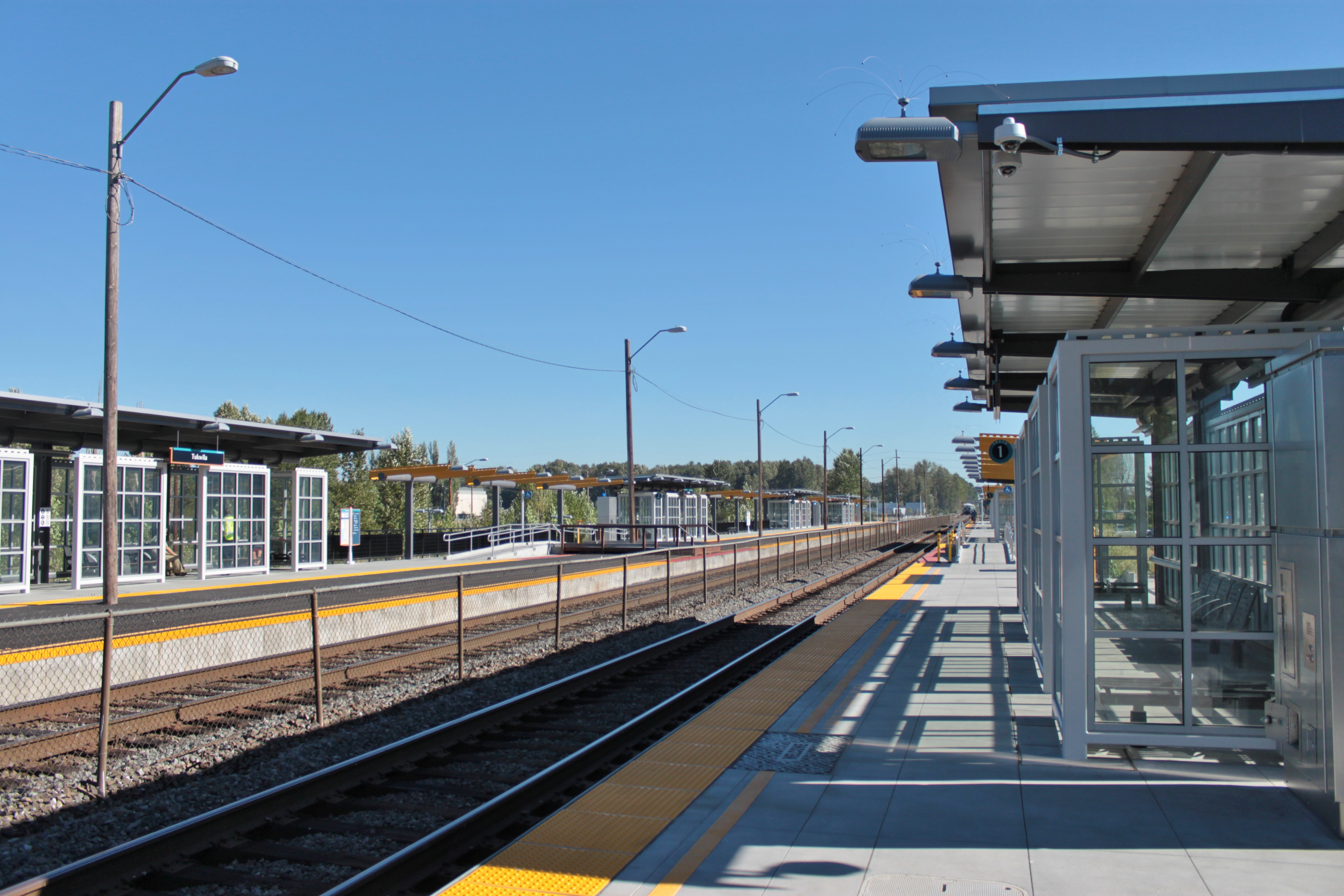
Before reconstruction of the new east platform

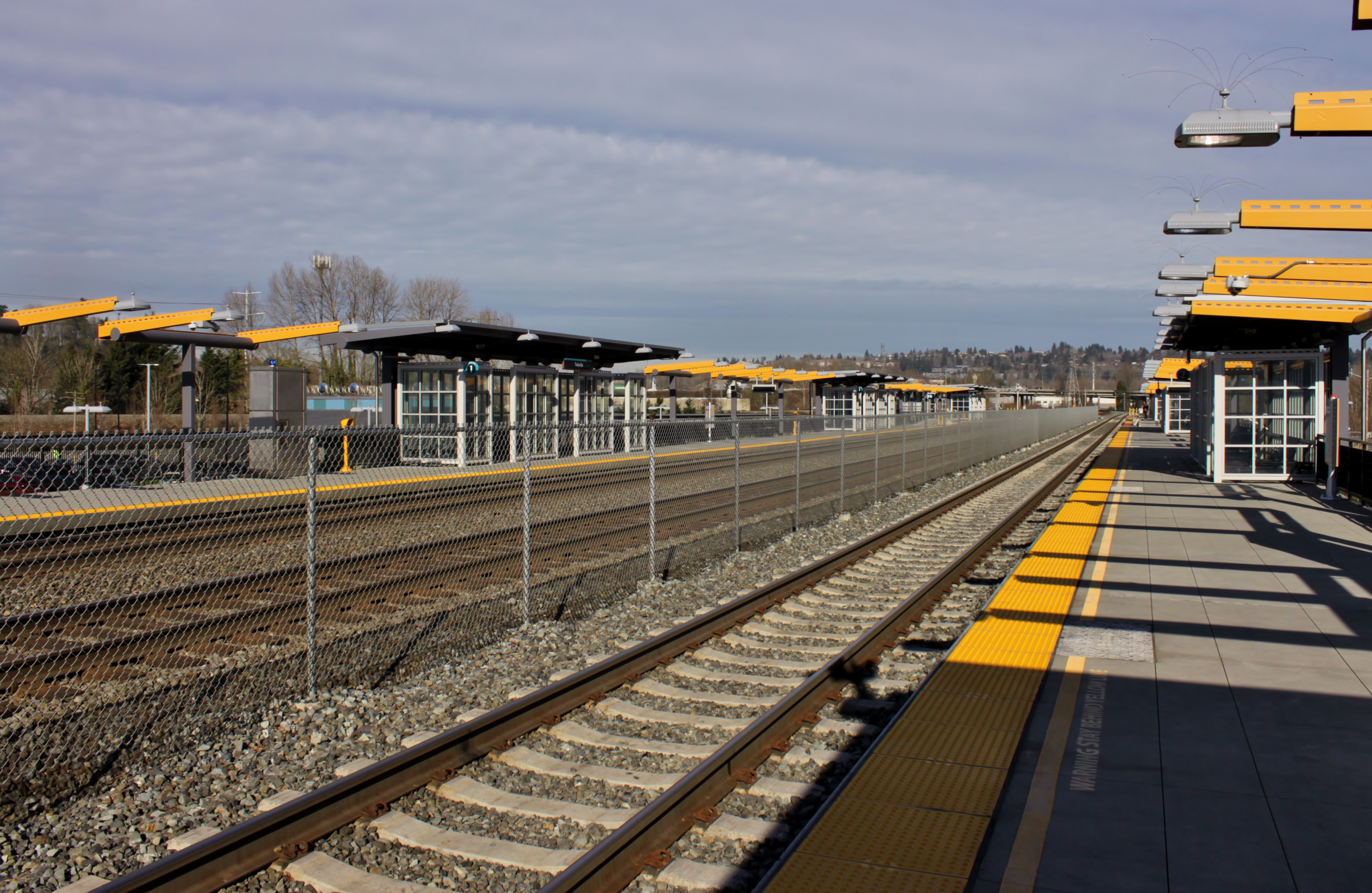
The east platform after completion of the third track, seen in 2018

Construction of the permanent station was pushed back into 2013 to allow for further design development. The $17 million construction contract was awarded to Absher Construction in April 2013, and a ceremonial groundbreaking was held on June 24, 2013. The west platform was demolished in August and replaced with a temporary platform to serve Sounder and Amtrak trains. In June 2014, the RapidRide F Line began serving the station's newly completed bus bays, replacing local service on routes 110 and 140 between Burien and Renton. The City of Renton completed its extension of Strander Boulevard to the station later in the month, connecting to the new park and ride on the west side of the platforms. Following a four-week closure of the east platform, both permanent platforms were re-opened in August 2014. Construction of the permanent station reached substantial completion in December, and the new station was dedicated by local dignitaries on February 18, 2015. The east platform was built with additional width to be removed for a third track, which was installed by BNSF in 2016.

=== Other proposals ===
Sound Transit has proposed building an intermodal connection at the station to the Link light rail system through a future extension. The Longacres site was considered in the Southcenter alternative for Central Link in 1999, but rejected in favor of a shorter route along Interstate 5. The agency's 2005 long-range plan studied a potential light rail line connecting Burien to Renton, with stops at Southcenter Mall and the Tukwila Sounder station. The 2014 update to the long-range plan re-studied the corridor as an extension to the proposed West Seattle light rail or bus rapid transit line, and also considered a connection to Sounder at Tukwila station.

Tukwila station is also being studied as a potential stop for the state's proposed high-speed rail network. The station is included in plans for a Vancouver, B.C.–Seattle–Portland line along the Cascades corridor, as well as a Seattle–Spokane line connecting to Eastern Washington.

== Services ==
The station is served by 13 daily round-trips on the Sounder S Line, which travel north to King Street Station in Downtown Seattle and south to Tacoma Dome Station or Lakewood station on weekdays. Amtrak operates eight daily trains on the Cascades that stop at Tukwila on its route between Seattle and Portland, Oregon. Tukwila is the closest Amtrak station to Seattle–Tacoma International Airport.

King County Metro operates two routes from the station's bus bays: the RapidRide F Line, which runs from Burien to Renton via Southcenter Mall; and Route 154, a peak-only service connecting the station to the Boeing Field industrial district.
