= Tacoma station (1984) =

Amtrak train station in Tacoma

Tacoma, WA
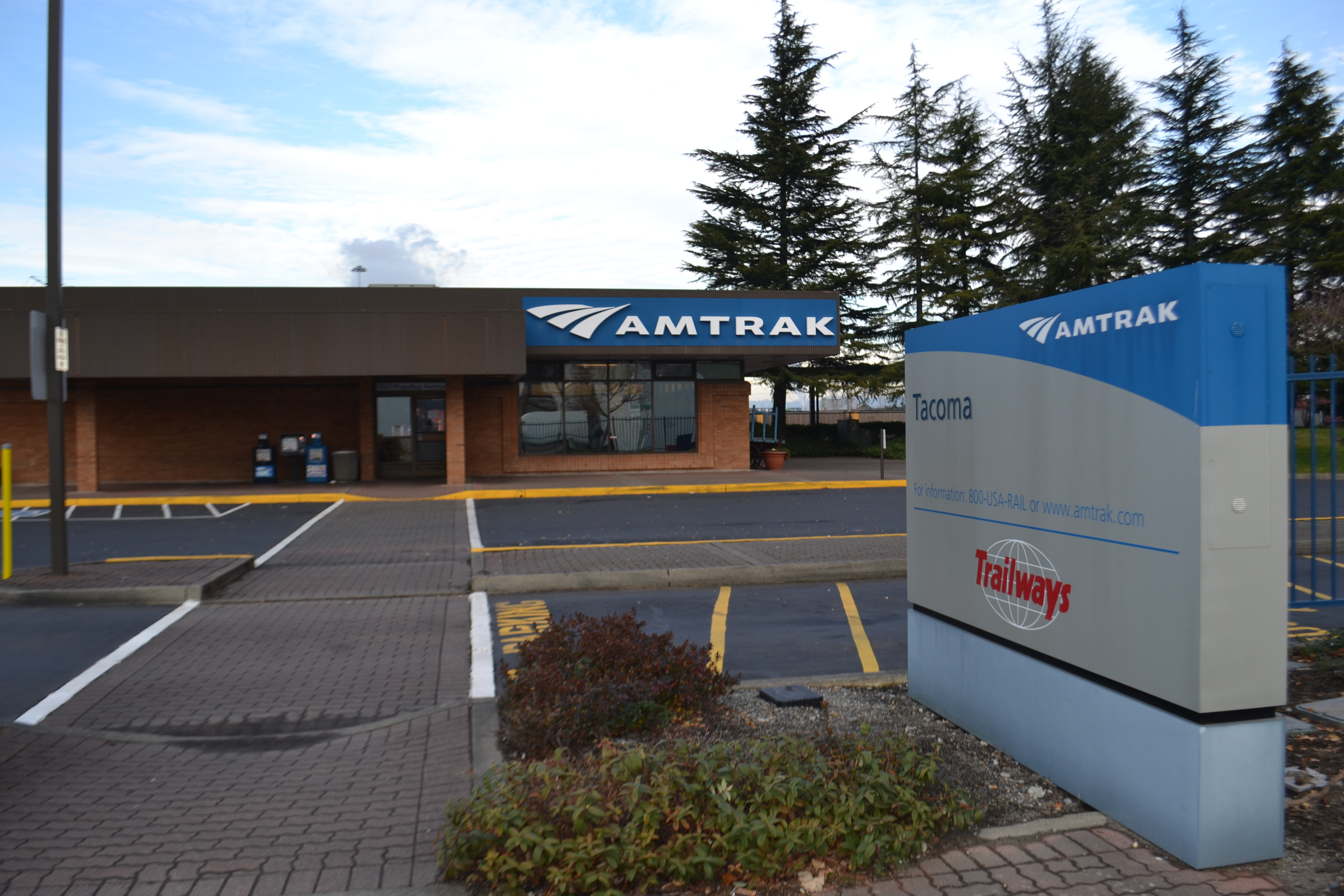

General information
- Location: 1001 Puyallup Avenue; Tacoma, Washington; United States
- Coordinates: 47.2420°N 122.4206°W
- Owner: Burlington Northern Santa Fe Railway
- Platforms: 1 side platform
- Tracks: 1

Construction
- Parking: Free
- Accessible: Yes

Other information
- Station code: TAC

History
- Opened: June 14, 1984; December 18, 2017 (reopened)
- Closed: December 17, 2017; November 18, 2021

Passengers
- 2016: 118,832 ▲0.52%

Former services
| Preceding station | Amtrak | Following station |
|---|---|---|
| Olympia-Lacey toward Los Angeles | Coast Starlight | Seattle Terminus |
| Olympia-Lacey toward Eugene | Amtrak Cascades | Tukwila toward Vancouver, British Columbia |
| Seattle Terminus | Pioneer Discontinued in 1997 | Olympia-Lacey toward Chicago |
Location

Tacoma was an Amtrak train station in Tacoma, Washington, United States. It was served by Amtrak's Cascades and Coast Starlight lines. The building was constructed in 1984 to a standard design that Amtrak developed in the 1970s and used at locations throughout the country for the next two decades. The station was replaced by a new Amtrak facility at Tacoma Dome Station, an existing commuter rail and light rail hub, that opened in 2017; however, it was reopened 24 hours after closing due to the 2017 Washington train derailment on the new line to the new station. The station remained in service until the Point Defiance Bypass was reopened to Amtrak trains on November 18, 2021.

== Construction ==
The station was constructed to replace Union Station, as the planned construction of the Tacoma Spur (Interstate 705) would remove its tracks, preventing passenger trains from accessing Union Station. Ground broke on the new station's building in 1983. It would cost $953,000 to construct using funds from the state government to reimburse the Burlington Northern Railroad for the retirement of Union Station and relocation of nearby tracks. Amtrak service began at the new station on June 14, 1984.

== Description ==
The one-story building was constructed to design 75C of the Amtrak Standard Stations Program. Features of the Tacoma station which were standard for stations of the Amtrak Standard Stations Program included brick walls, floor-to-ceiling windows, and a flat cantilevered roof. The building measured 81 by 45 feet (25 by 14 m), and was designed to be expandable, should demand warrant it. It was designed to accommodate 75 people at a time, with seating for 48 people.

== Replacement ==
WSDOT adopted long-term plans in the 1990s to relocate the Amtrak station to a new hub at Freighthouse Square, where Sound Transit had begun construction of the Tacoma Dome commuter rail station. After a plan from 2013 to build a new station in the west end of the building was rejected due to public criticism of the design, the state of Washington in 2015 completed a new design, placing the station in the center of the building. In March 2016, the state reached an agreement to purchase the required part of the building and demolish it to make way for the new station, with construction to begin in June 2016.

Amtrak trains were rerouted away from Tacoma's shoreline and onto a new inland cutoff route, the Point Defiance Bypass, which opened with the new station on December 18, 2017. The station is located in the Freighthouse Square building, a former warehouse rebuilt into a collection of small businesses and eateries near the Tacoma Dome. The trains were re-routed back onto the original route after a major derailment on the bypass near DuPont, Washington on that same day.

The Puyallup Avenue station remained in use until the Point Defiance Bypass was re-opened to Amtrak service on November 18, 2021. The old station was boarded up and later covered in graffiti and trash with visible signs of fires; BNSF stated that they were in the process of selling the building.

=== Boardings and alightings ===
| Year | 2011 | 2012 | 2013 | 2014 | 2015 | 2016 |
|---|---|---|---|---|---|---|
| Total | 124,252 | 123,063 | 126,027 | 125,984 | 118,223 | 118,832 |
| YOY Difference | - | -1,189 | 2,964 | -43 | -7,761 | 609 |
| YOY Difference % | - | -0.96% | 2.41% | -0.03% | -6.16% | 0.52% |
