= King Street Station =

Amtrak and commuter train station in Seattle, Washington, United States

King Street Station Seattle, WA
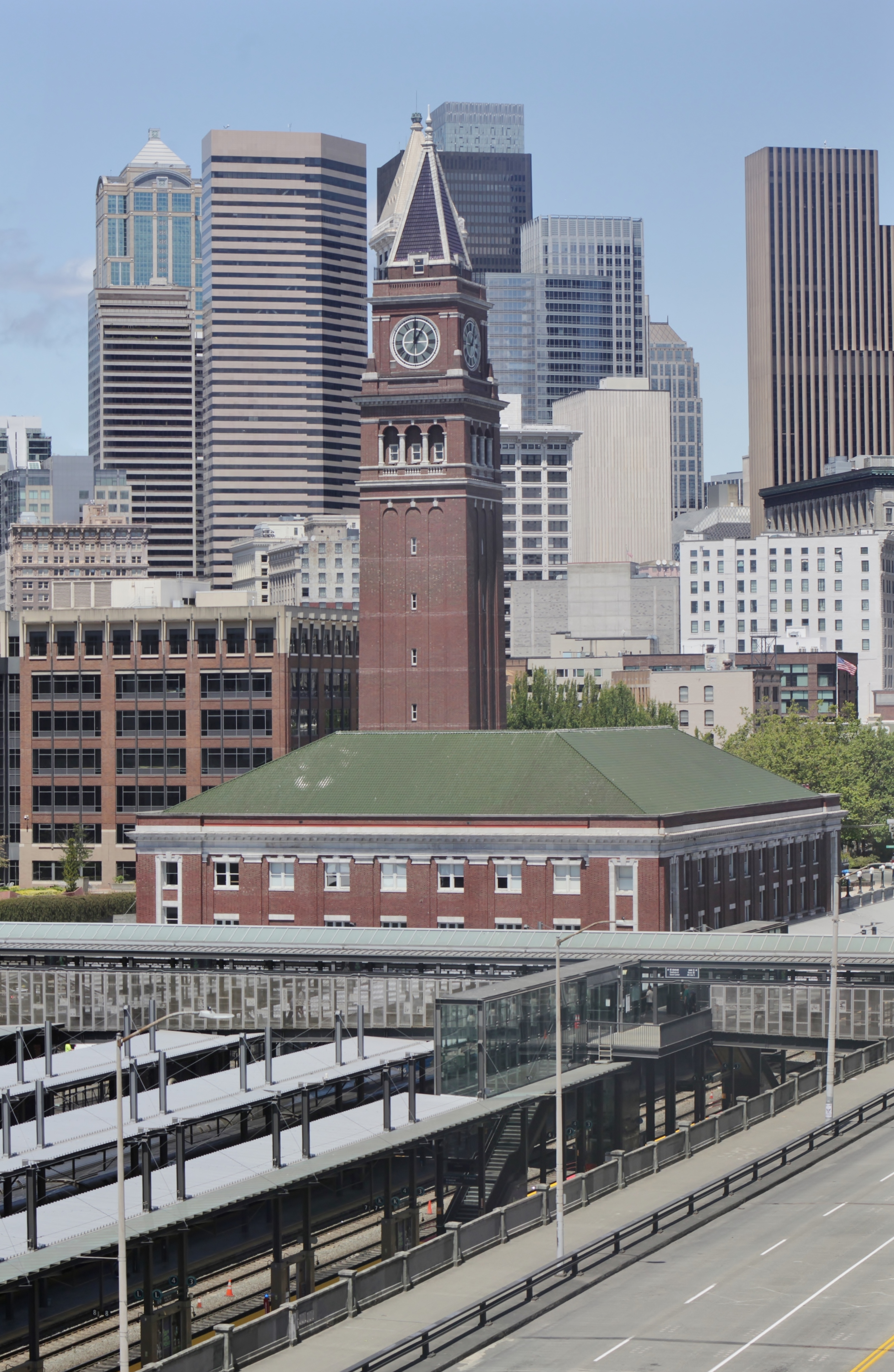
- View of the station from the southeast

General information
- Location: 303 South Jackson Street; Seattle, Washington; United States
- Coordinates: 47°35′54″N 122°19′47″W
- Owner: City of Seattle
- Lines: BNSF Seattle Subdivision, Scenic Subdivision
- Platforms: 4 (3 island, 1 side)
- Tracks: 7
- Train operators: Amtrak, Sound Transit
- Bus operators: Amtrak Thruway, Northwestern Trailways, Travel Washington
- Connections: Light rail: (transfer at International District/Chinatown) Streetcar: First Hill Streetcar (transfer at 5th & Jackson) Transit bus services: King County Metro, Sound Transit Express, Community Transit

Construction
- Structure type: At-grade
- Parking: Paid parking nearby
- Accessible: Yes

Other information
- Station code: Amtrak: SEA

History
- Opened: May 10, 1906; 120 years ago
- Rebuilt: 2008–2013; 13 years ago

Passengers
Amtrak
- FY 2025: 736,898 annually
Sounder
- 2025: 824,565 annually

Services
Preceding station	Amtrak	Following station
Tukwila toward Eugene	Amtrak Cascades	Edmonds toward Vancouver, British Columbia
Tacoma Dome toward Los Angeles	Coast Starlight	Terminus
Terminus	Empire Builder	Edmonds toward Chicago
Preceding station	Sound Transit	Following station
Sounder
Terminus	N Line	Edmonds toward Everett
Tukwila toward Lakewood	S Line	Terminus
Former services
Preceding station	Amtrak	Following station
Terminus	Empire Builder	East Auburn toward Chicago
Terminus	North Coast Hiawatha	Edmonds toward Chicago
Terminus	Expo '74	Edmonds toward Spokane
Terminus	Pioneer	Tacoma toward Chicago
Preceding station	Rocky Mountaineer	Following station
Terminus	Coastal Passage	Pacific Central (Vancouver) towards Banff or Jasper
Preceding station	Great Northern Railway	Following station
Terminus	Main Line	Interbay toward St. Paul
Terminus	Vancouver, BC – Seattle	Interbay toward Vancouver, BC
Kent toward Portland	Portland–Seattle Line	Terminus
Preceding station	Northern Pacific Railway	Following station
Terminus	Main Line	Kent toward St. Paul
Kent toward Portland	Portland–Seattle Line	Terminus
- King Street Station
- U.S. National Register of Historic Places
- Location: 3rd Ave. S. and S. King St. Seattle, Washington
- Built: 1906
- Architect: Reed and Stem
- NRHP reference No.: 73001877
- Added to NRHP: April 13, 1973
Location

King Street Station is a train station in Seattle, Washington, United States. It is served by Amtrak's Cascades, Coast Starlight, and Empire Builder, as well as Sounder commuter trains run by Sound Transit. The station also anchors a major transit hub, which includes Link light rail at International District/Chinatown station and Seattle Streetcar service. It is located at the south end of Downtown Seattle in the Pioneer Square neighborhood, near the intersection of South Jackson Street and 4th Avenue South, and has four major entrances. It is the 15th-busiest station on the Amtrak system, serving as the hub for the Pacific Northwest region.

Opened on May 10, 1906, it served as a union station for the Great Northern Railway and the Northern Pacific Railway, both owned by James J. Hill. The station was designed by Reed and Stem and incorporated elements from various architectural styles, including a prominent clocktower inspired by St. Mark's Campanile in Venice. A second city terminal, Union Station, was built one block to the east and opened in 1911. As passenger train service declined in the mid-20th century, King Street Station fell into disrepair and was renovated several times to conceal interior elements in the name of modernization. It was selected as Amtrak's sole Seattle station in 1971 and was listed on the National Register of Historic Places two years later. Commuter rail service began in 2000 from a new platform and pedestrian bridge at South Weller Street. King Street Station was acquired by Seattle's city government in 2008 and renovated in 2013 at a cost of $55 million, restoring its original fixtures.

The current station consists of ten tracks and four platforms, including one that is used by Sounder commuter trains and connected via a pedestrian bridge on South Weller Street. The remaining platforms, accessed from the station's waiting room, are used for Amtrak services and special event trains.

== History ==
Built between 1904 and 1906 by the Great Northern Railway and Northern Pacific Railway, the station replaced an antiquated station on Railroad Avenue, today's Alaskan Way. Designed by the firm of Reed and Stem of St. Paul, Minnesota, who acted as associate architects for the design of Grand Central Terminal in New York City, the station was part of a larger project to bypass the congested railyards along the waterfront by diverting mainline traffic into a planned tunnel under downtown. The depot's 242-foot (74 m) tower was modeled after the recently collapsed Campanile di San Marco in Venice, Italy, making it the tallest building in Seattle at the time of its construction. This tower contained four huge mechanical clock faces built by E. Howard & Co. of Boston, Massachusetts, offering the time to each of the four cardinal directions. At the time of installation it was said to be the second largest timepiece on the Pacific Coast, second only to the Ferry Building in San Francisco, California. Later, this tower also served as a microwave tower for the Burlington Northern Railroad, the successor of both the Great Northern and Northern Pacific railways, whose offices occupied the second and third floors of the station. King Street Station was Seattle's primary train terminal until the construction of the adjacent Oregon & Washington Depot, later named Union Station, in 1911; the 1912 Baist's Real Estate Atlas of Seattle still refers to King Street Station as "Union Passenger Depot".

After the end of World War II, as passenger rail travel began to decline across the United States, steps were taken to gradually modernize King Street Station. The ticket counters, once located directly to the east of the compass room, were expanded outward into the waiting room. In the late 1940s a set of "electric stairs" and a new side entrance to the second floor railroad offices were built over the open stairwell to Jackson Street, narrowing them by half. Over the next two decades, as train ridership and the station's number of employees dwindled, the station was further remodeled to reduce maintenance and heating costs. In the late 1950s the station's original high-back benches, made of yellow oak, were replaced by modern chrome and plastic seats. The final blow to the station's character occurred in late 1967 when, under the direction of Northern Pacific architect A.C. Cayou, a new drop ceiling of plastic and metal was installed in the waiting room ten feet below the original, concealing the hand-carved coffered ceiling to just below the balcony and second level arcade. Hundreds of holes had to be punched through the plaster to attach the ceiling's support wires to the steel frame of the building. The new ceiling held new fluorescent lights and heat lamps, replacing the original brass chandeliers and sconces. Below the new ceiling, plaster reliefs, marble panels, glass tile mosaics and other original fixtures were sheared from the walls and replaced with sheet rock and Formica paneling. The dedicated women's waiting room at the southwest corner of the building was converted into employee offices; its own architectural details suffering the same damage. The only original remaining features left visible in the main waiting area were the terrazzo tile floor and the clock on the west wall above the restrooms.

Despite the attempted modernization, the station continued to deteriorate. Following the creation of Amtrak in 1971 to take over the money-losing passenger service from the railroad companies, hundreds of routes were eliminated and service across the country was cut in half. Amtrak consolidated all of its Seattle service at King Street Station, resulting in the closure of Union Station, which formerly served Union Pacific (the Milwaukee Road had moved out a decade earlier). To further cut costs the station's restaurant, lunch counter, and gift shop were immediately closed and vending machines installed. Eventually even the escalators stopped running and without the funds or passenger volume to justify repairing them, were permanently walled off.

Today, the station has been fully restored and is part of a group of transportation facilities in the southern portion of Downtown Seattle. King Street Station is located a block away from the International District/Chinatown station of the Downtown Seattle Transit Tunnel serving the Link Light Rail 1 Line. Many King County Metro and Sound Transit Express bus routes serve the area, and the First Hill line of the Seattle Streetcar network stops nearby. After many years, the original upper entrance off of Jackson Street has been reopened. The station entrance located on the first floor off King Street now also has a passenger drop-off loop for vehicles, instead of a small parking lot.

=== Restoration ===
Plans to restore the entire building to its former prominence, including cosmetic renovations to both the station interior and exterior, began in 2003. As part of these renovations the Compass Room and restrooms were refurbished, and the exterior awnings were replaced. New mahogany entry doors and wood framed windows were installed in the waiting room and Compass Room. New brass door hardware and reproduction period light fixtures and plaster decorative work were included to reproduce the former character of the station's interior.

In November 2006, the Office of Seattle Mayor Greg Nickels announced a preliminary agreement between the City of Seattle and BNSF Railway to purchase the station for $1. The Seattle City Council formalized the agreement by passing legislation in December 2006. The deal, revised to $10, was signed March 5, 2008. The purchase by the city freed up US$19 million of state and federal funds that was used for further restoration of the station. The city earmarked a further US$10 million for the restoration as part of a passed local transportation levy.

In 2008, the clocks in the clock tower were repaired, and the old radio microwave antennas were removed. Repair work to the exterior continued as of June 2010. Phase two of the project began in May 2010, when demolition work commenced on the second and third floors, previously used by Burlington Northern for division offices. Work on modernizing the baggage area, originally used as a restaurant, were also undertaken during this time. During June 2010, work also began on demolition of a 1950s addition to the building that housed the escalators and part of the Jackson Street Plaza. Demolition work was completed by September 2010. A surprise development during this phase was the removal of the suspended ceilings in early July. Crews worked over several nights while the station was mostly empty removing the over 1,600 acoustic tiles and their framing. The modern light fixtures and remaining suspended wires remained until enough funding became available to complete restoration. The final phase of the project focused on the rebuilding of the Jackson Plaza. Thirty-six geothermic wells reaching 300 ft (91 m) into the ground were drilled to eventually heat and cool the station. A new concrete floor was poured including seismic wall supports and space for an elevator and new ticketing and baggage areas.

In October 2010, the King Street Station project was awarded $18.2 million from $2.4 billion in high-speed intercity passenger rail service funding announced by the U.S. Transportation Department. This funding was needed by the project in order to complete seismic regrades and to finalize the restoration of the interior. The restoration project was completed and the station was officially rededicated on April 24, 2013.

== Architecture ==
King Street Station is a red brick masonry and steel frame building with terra cotta and cast stone ornamentation, through relatively subdued in comparison to the clock tower. The architectural style is sometimes denoted as "Railroad Italianate" with definite Italian inspirations on the interior and in the clock tower while the base shows influences of Beaux Arts.

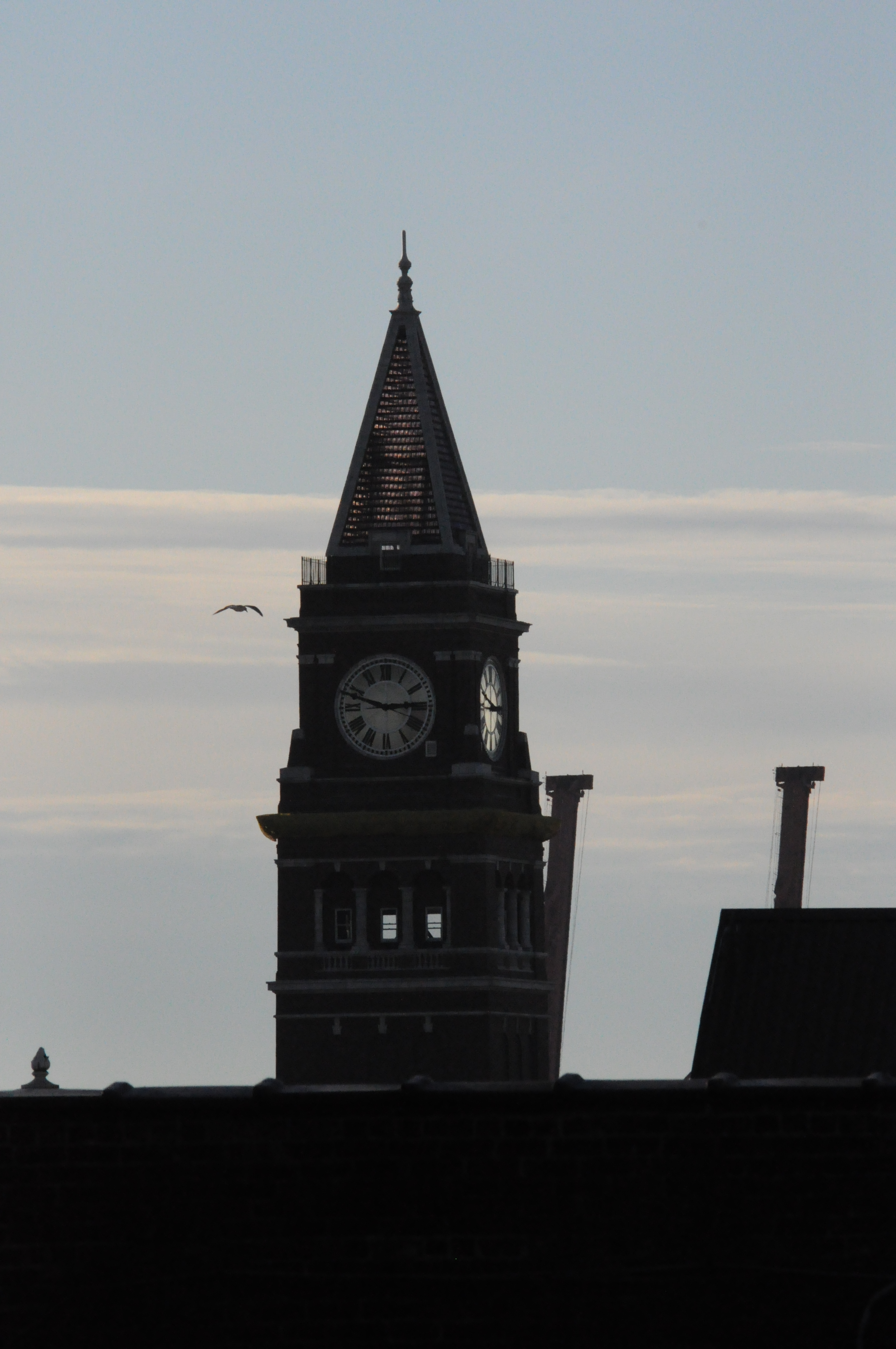
Light shining through glass Ludowici tiles on roof of King Street Station tower

The entire first floor exterior is brick-clad with granite. The building is L-shaped with the clock tower marking the main entry on the west facade. The clock tower and main entry terminate the axis of King Street in Pioneer Square.

The main building's roof features Ludowici clay tile with a green glaze. The clock tower's roof is unique; it's covered with glass Ludowici tile that is backlit at night to showcase its transparency. The glass tiles were made with manganese, causing them to turn purple over time from UV exposure. During the 2013 restoration these tiles were replaced with salvaged glass tiles of the same age made by the same manufacturer.

Inside the main entry, at the base of the clock tower, is the entry hall, known as the Compass Room. The name references the navigational star compass rose design laid out in hand-cut marble tiles on the floor at its center. The Compass Room has marble wainscotting, and is lighted by a multi-globe chandelier suspended above the compass rose from an elaborate plaster rosette. Triple-globe wall sconces around the perimeter illuminate a band of inlaid green iridescent glass tile on the walls. Circular clerestory windows are trimmed in plaster relief decoration. This motif was originally repeated throughout most of the station's waiting room. While there is no known influence for the design of the interior, it resembles the ceiling of the famous Salone dei Cinquecento at the Palazzo Vecchio in Florence, Italy featuring a similar coffered grid with dentils and repeating circles, while the terrazzo floor features Greek-influenced meander patterns.

== Services ==
King Street Station has 25 daily train departures:

- Thirteen Sounder S Line commuter rail trains south to Tacoma with eight trains continuing south to Lakewood (weekdays only)
- Four Sounder N Line commuter rail trains north to Everett (weekdays only)
- Two Amtrak Cascades regional trains north to Vancouver, BC
- Six Amtrak Cascades regional trains south to Portland, OR with one train continuing south to Eugene, OR
- One Amtrak Empire Builder long-distance train east to Chicago, IL
- One Amtrak Coast Starlight long-distance train south to Los Angeles, CA

From 2014 to 2019, Rocky Mountaineer operated excursion trains on its Coastal Passage service between Seattle and Banff, Alberta.

=== Amtrak boardings and alightings ===
Year	2011	2012	2013	2014	2015	2016	2017	2018	2019	2020	2021	2022	2023	2024
Total	672,485	672,351	640,054	626,623	604,832	649,491	667,475	686,426	682,132	289,180	193,076	384,726	689,710	726,467
YOY difference	—	-134	-32,297	-13,431	-21,791	44,659	17,984	18,951	-4,294	-392,952	-96,104	191,650	304,984	36,757
YOY difference %	—	-0.02%	-4.80%	-2.10%	-3.48%	7.38%	2.77%	2.84%	-0.63%	-57.61%	-33.23%	99.26%	79.27%	5.36%

== Gallery ==
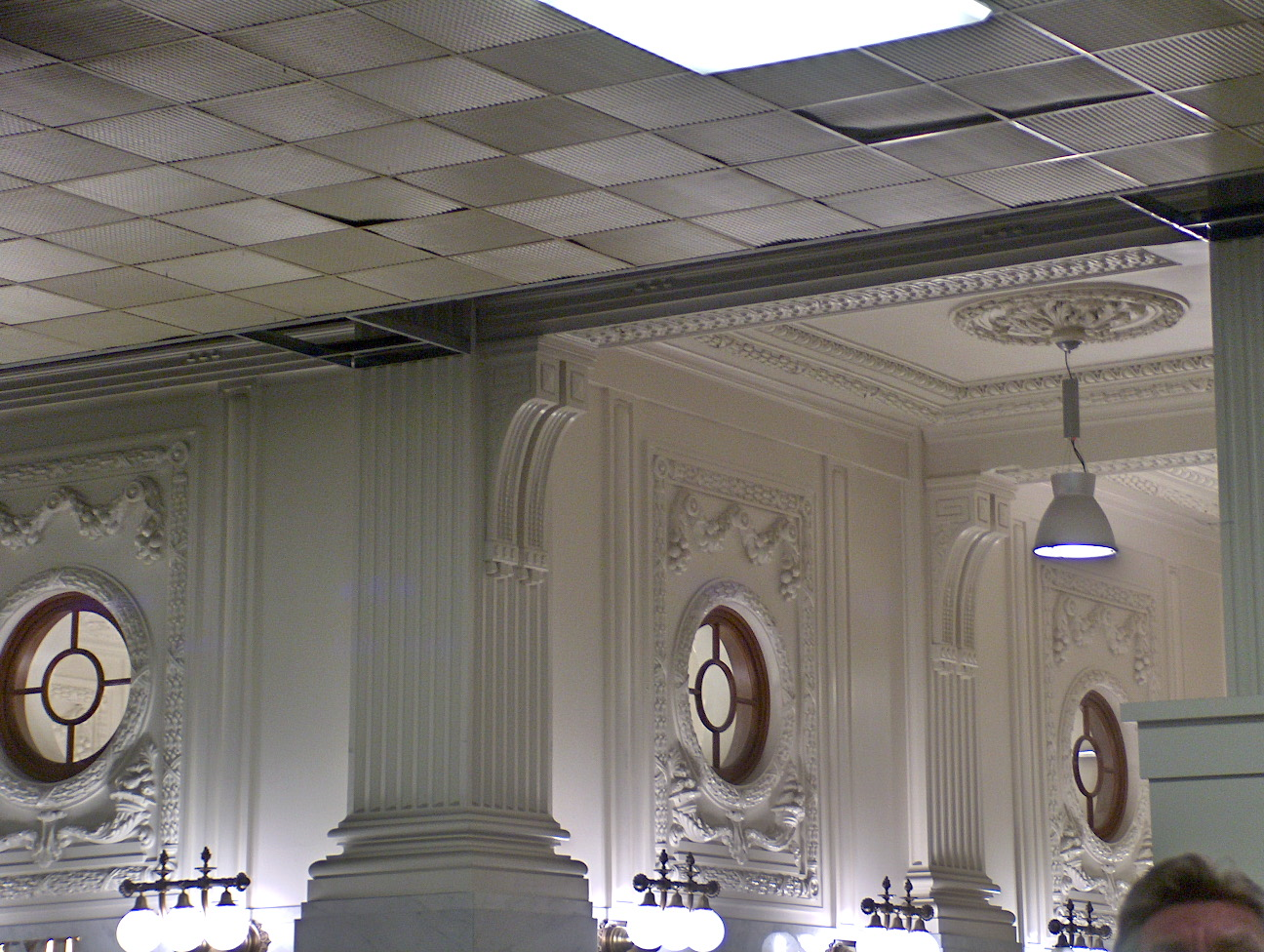
View of suspended ceiling, now removed

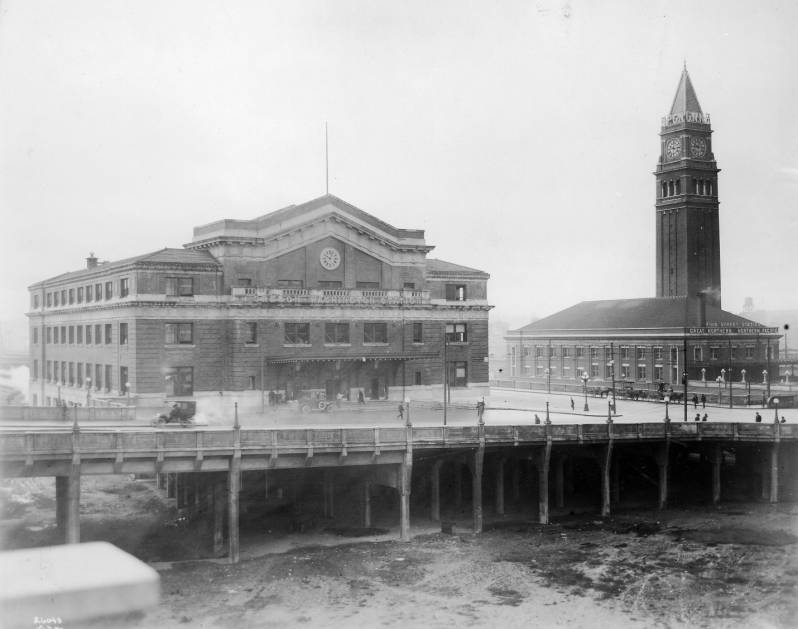
King Street Station and Union Station, 1913

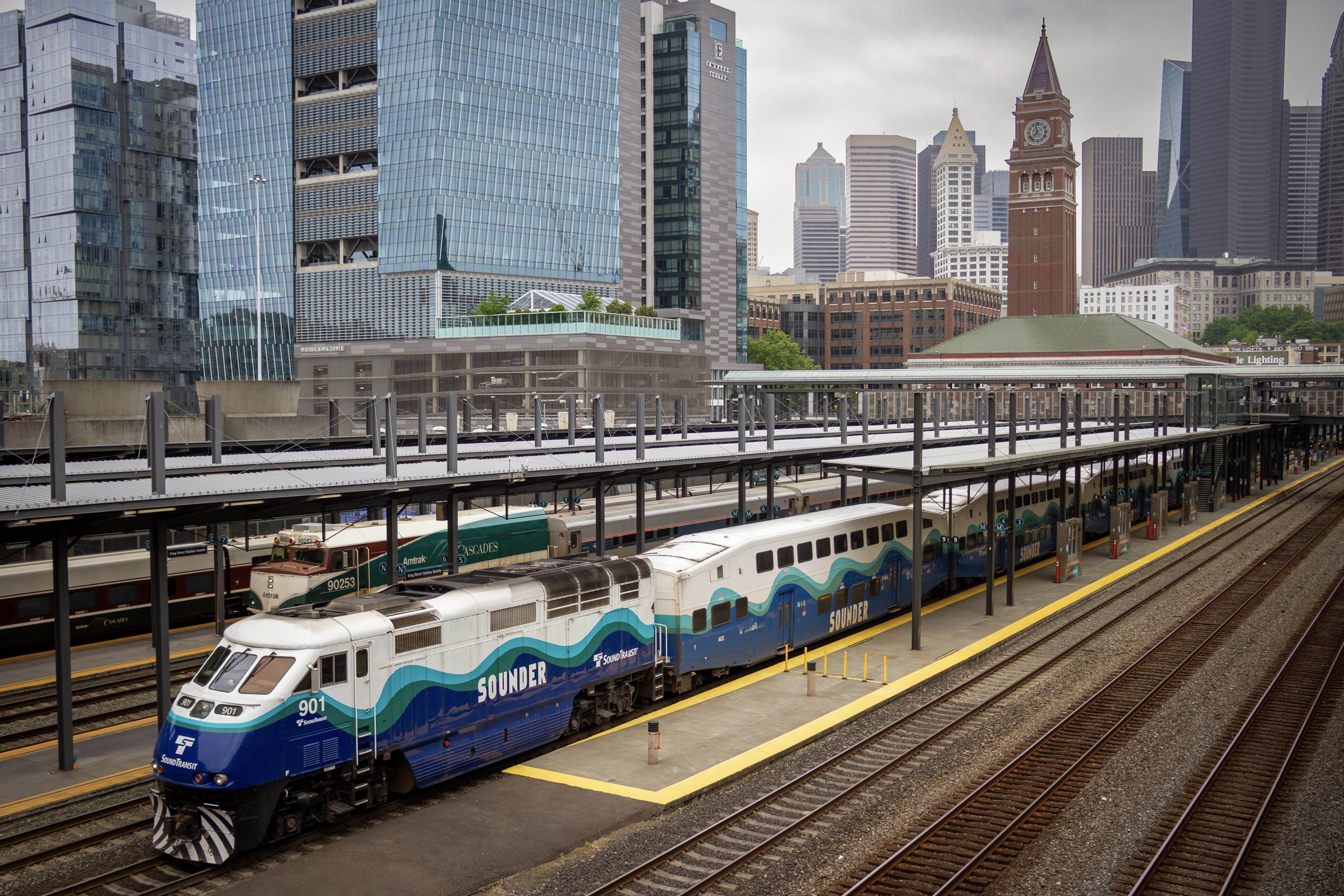
A Sounder train at the station

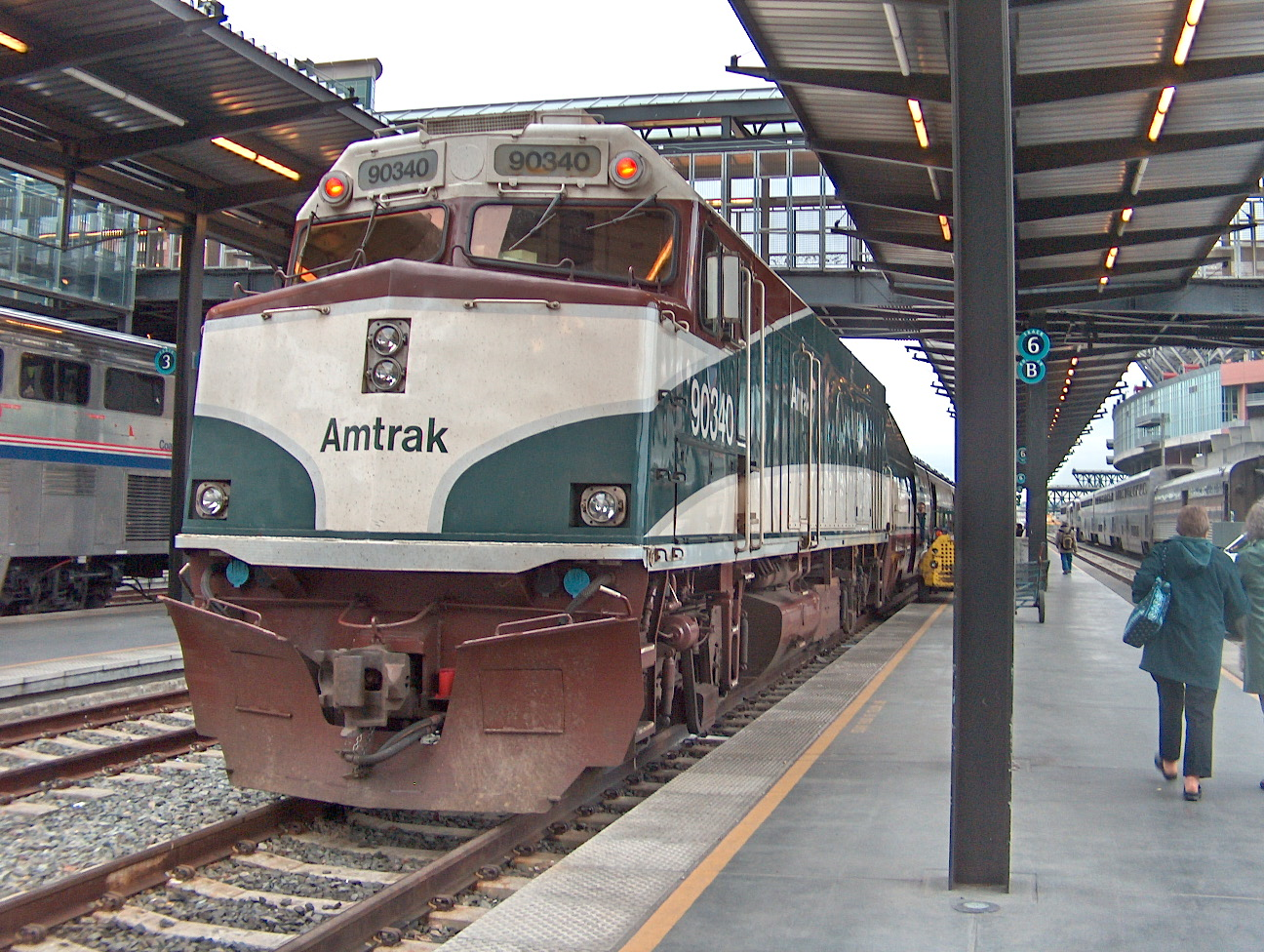
An Amtrak Cascades train in King Street Station

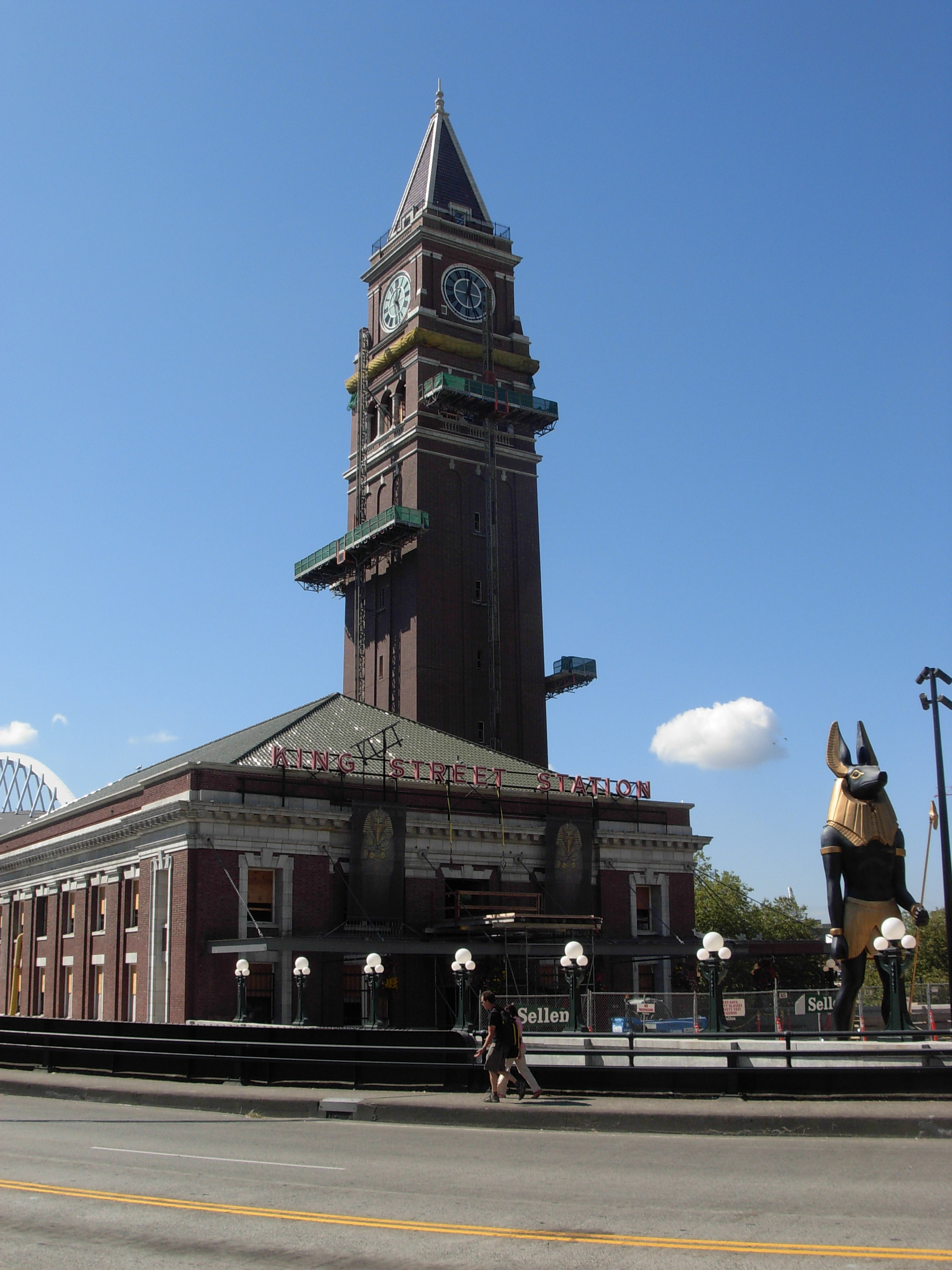
King Street Station rehab

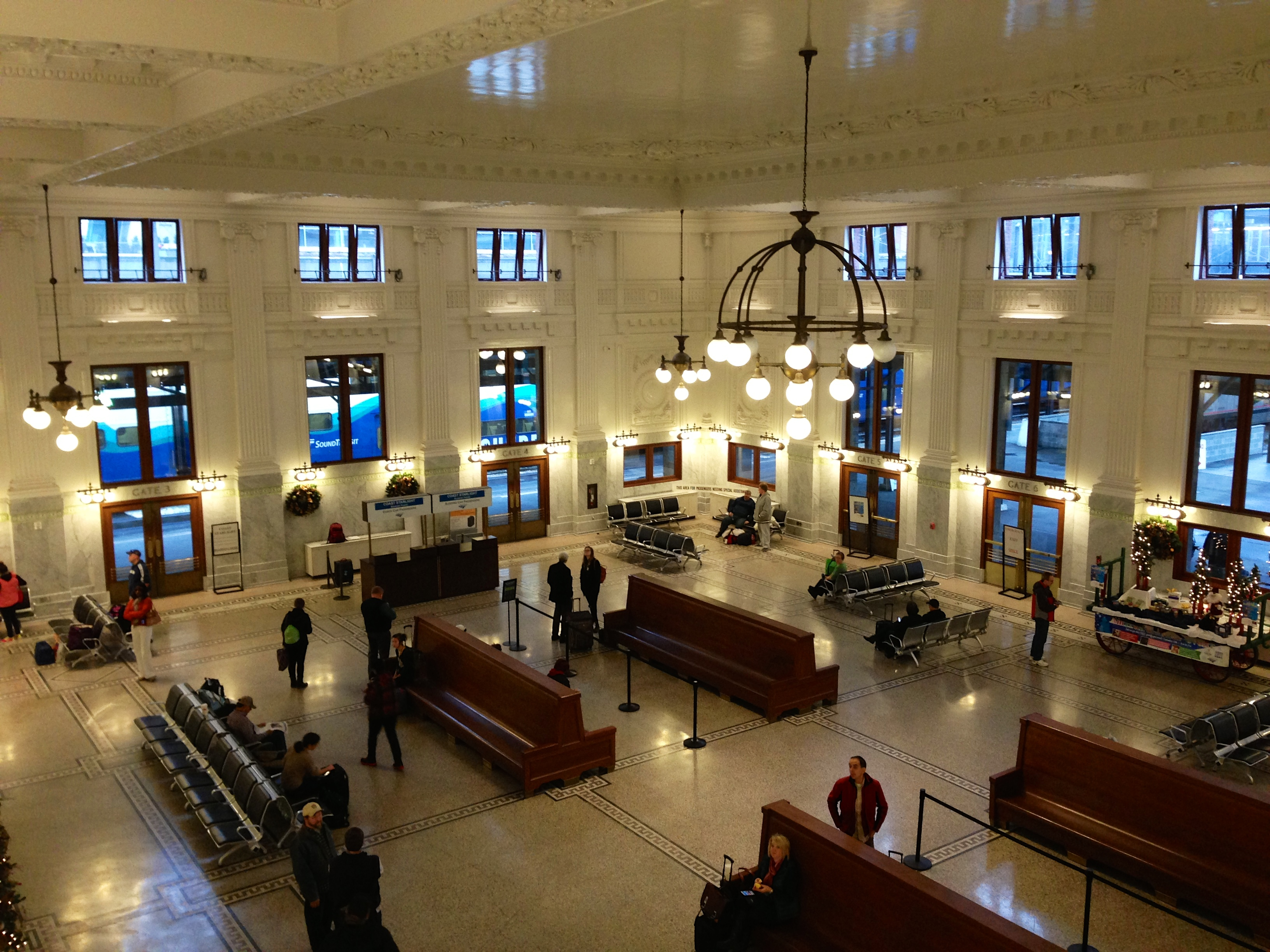
Remodeled interior of King Street Station

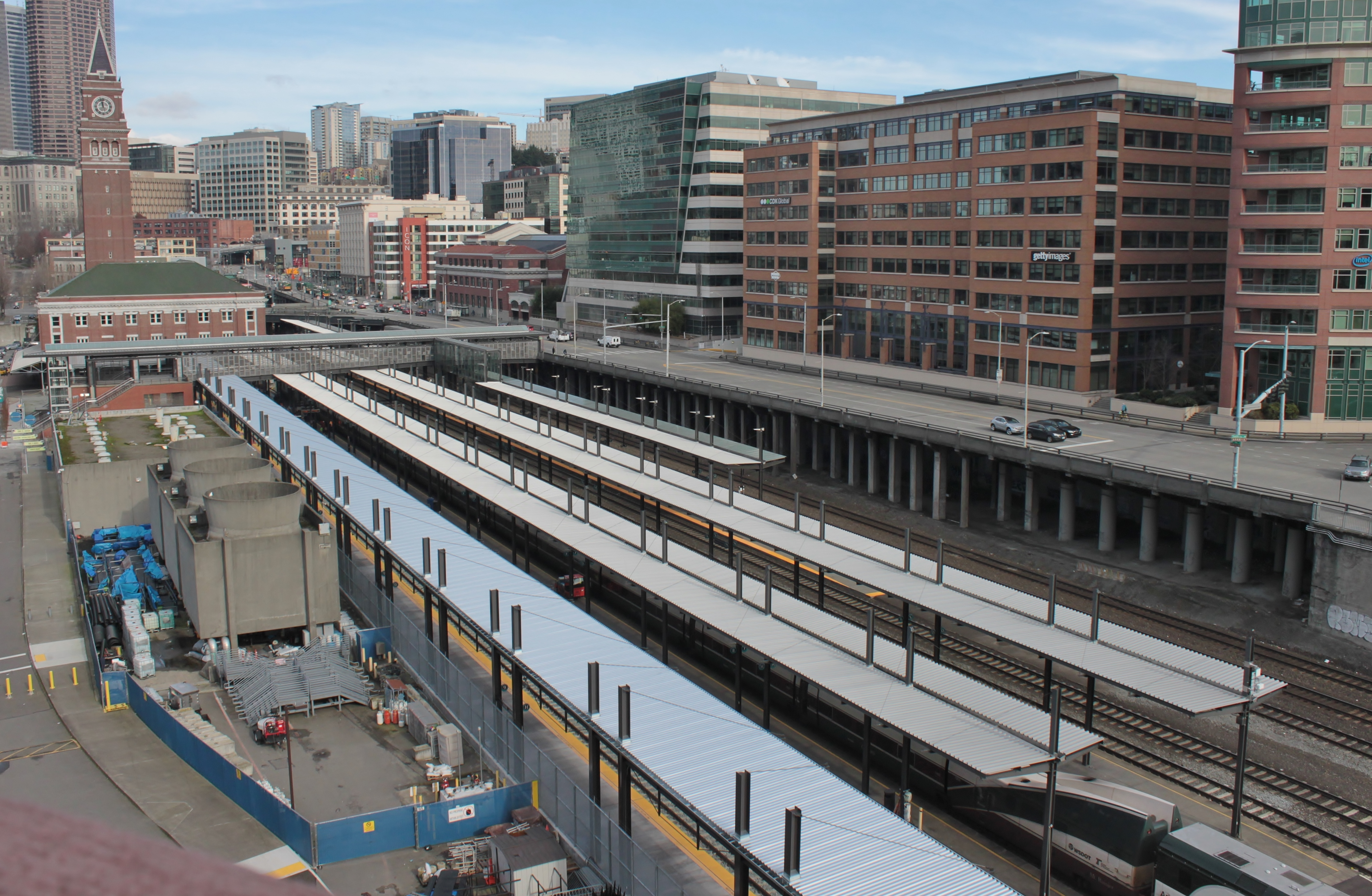
View of the platforms from the southwest

== Nearby places ==
- Pioneer Square National Historic District
- Klondike Gold Rush National Historic Park
- International District
- Downtown Seattle Transit Tunnel
- Lumen Field (formerly CenturyLink Field)
- T-Mobile Park (formerly Safeco Field)
- Union Station
- International District/Chinatown station
