= Tacoma Dome Station =

Intermodal transportation hub in Tacoma, Washington

Tacoma Dome Station Tacoma, WA
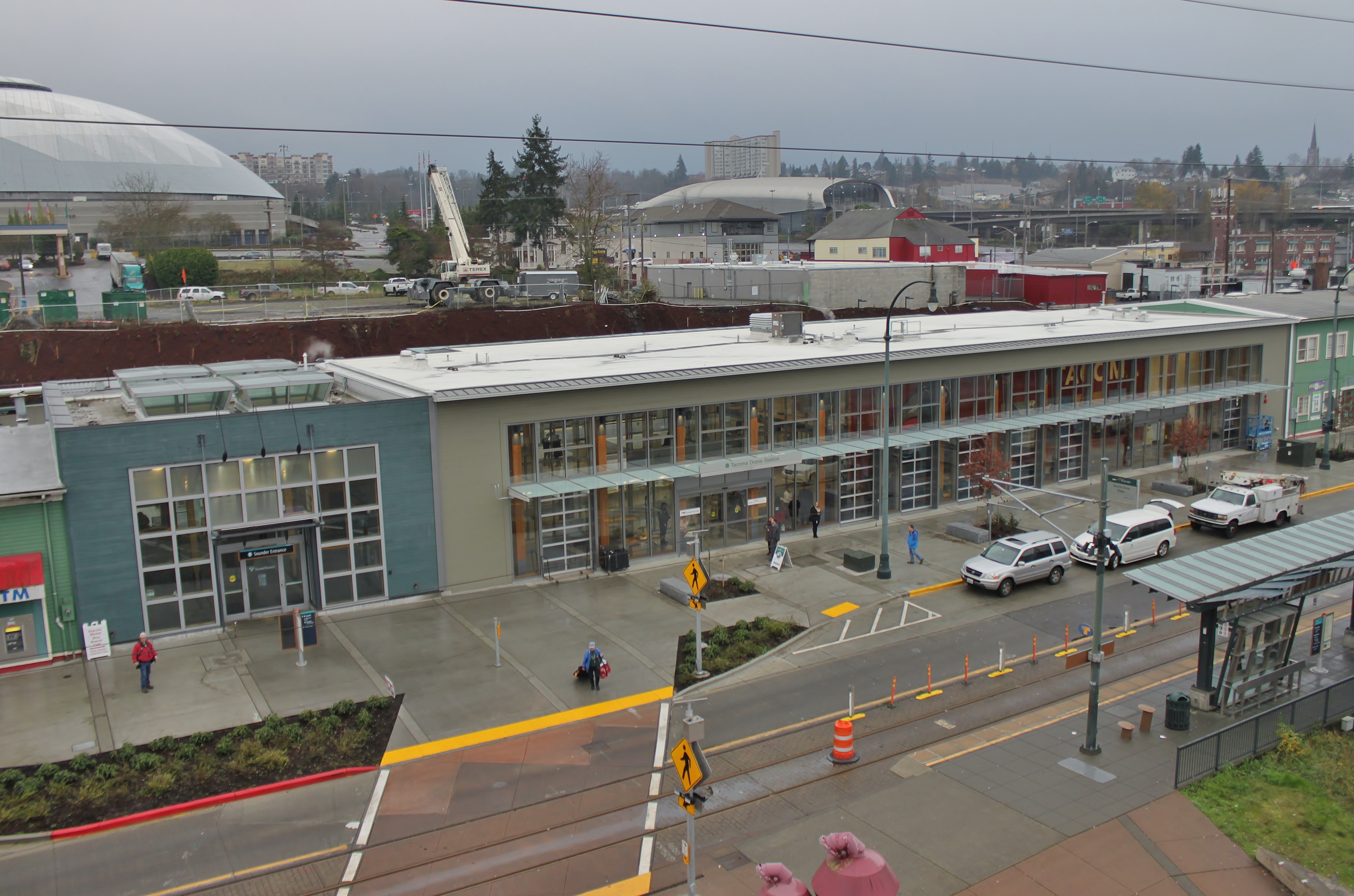
- The Sounder and Amtrak concourses at Tacoma Dome Station, along with the Link platform, viewed from the parking garage

General information
- Location: 424 E 25th Street; Tacoma, Washington; United States
- Coordinates: 47°14′23″N 122°25′40″W
- Owner: Pierce Transit
- Line: Sound Transit Lakeview Subdivision
- Platforms: 2 side platforms
- Tracks: 2
- Bus routes: 14
- Bus stands: 5
- Bus operators: Pierce Transit, Sound Transit Express, Intercity Transit, Greyhound

Construction
- Parking: 2,283 spaces
- Cycle facilities: Racks and lockers
- Accessible: yes

Other information
- Station code: Amtrak: TAC

History
- Opened: September 15, 2003; 22 years ago
- Rebuilt: 2016–2017; 9 years ago

Passengers
- 110,754 total boardings (Amtrak, FY 2025); 171,123 total boardings (Sounder, 2025); 195,155 total boardings (T Line, 2025)

Services
Preceding station	Amtrak	Following station
Olympia–Lacey toward Eugene	Amtrak Cascades	Tukwila toward Vancouver, British Columbia
Olympia–Lacey toward Los Angeles	Coast Starlight	Seattle Terminus
Preceding station	Sound Transit	Following station
Sounder
South Tacoma toward Lakewood	S Line	Puyallup toward Seattle
Link
South 25th Street toward St. Joseph	T Line	Terminus
Future services
Preceding station	Sound Transit	Following station
Future service
East Tacoma toward Lynnwood City Center	1 Line Tacoma Dome Extension (2032)	Terminus
Location

Tacoma Dome Station is a train station and transit hub in Tacoma, Washington, United States. It is served by Amtrak trains, the S Line of Sounder commuter rail, the T Line of Link light rail, and buses on local and intercity routes. Located near the Tacoma Dome near Downtown Tacoma, the station consists of two train platforms used by Sounder and Amtrak trains, a platform for the T Line, a bus terminal, and two parking garages. The Sounder station is integrated into Freighthouse Square, a former Milwaukee Road depot that was converted into a shopping mall.

The Tacoma Dome Station complex was constructed and opened in phases from 1997 to 2017. The parking garage and bus terminal were opened in 1997. Sounder service began in September 2000, followed by Tacoma Link (now the T Line) in August 2003, and a permanent platform for Sounder was opened in September 2003.

Amtrak service briefly began on December 18, 2017, after the opening of the Point Defiance Bypass, replacing a nearby station. However, after a derailment that day, Amtrak rerouted Cascades and Coast Starlight trains back to the old station until November 18, 2021. By 2035, an extension of the Link light rail system will connect Tacoma Dome Station to Federal Way, Seattle–Tacoma International Airport, and Downtown Seattle.

== Sounder station ==
Plans for a commuter rail line between Seattle and the Tacoma Dome area date back to the late 1980s, using existing tracks owned by the BNSF Railway. In early 1995, the Regional Transit Authority (RTA; later Sound Transit) ran experimental commuter rail service to Tacoma from Seattle during weekday peak periods and on weekends for Seattle SuperSonics games at the Tacoma Dome. The RTA's regional transit plan was approved by voters in 1996 and included a permanent commuter rail service between Tacoma and Seattle, with funding for a new station in the Tacoma Dome area. Pierce Transit approved construction of a $36.7 million, 1,200-stall park and ride garage near the Tacoma Dome in 1994, in anticipation of future commuter rail service. Construction on the garage began in July 1996, and the transit center complex opened on October 25, 1997, replacing a smaller park and ride lot.

Sounder commuter rail service at Tacoma Dome Station began on September 18, 2000, using a temporary platform near Puyallup Avenue two blocks north of the parking garage. A second parking garage, holding 1,200 stalls, was opened the following month to accommodate Sounder commuters. In November, Sound Transit reached an agreement with the City of Tacoma to build the permanent Sounder platform at Freighthouse Square, using 1.3 miles (2.1 km) of Tacoma Rail tracks. A finalized agreement was approved by Sound Transit and the City of Tacoma in April 2002, with two tracks and a grade separated crossing of Portland Avenue near the Port of Tacoma. Construction of the $17.3 million station began with a groundbreaking ceremony on December 11, 2002.

The concourse and 740-foot-long (230 m) platform were completed on September 15, 2003, with service beginning that morning, and dedicated by elected officials on September 26. The new platform was closed in January 2004, after concerns about soil instability on the new approach tracks had become apparent after a minor derailment. Trains reverted to using the temporary platform until August, when a $1.5 million stabilization project was completed. Tacoma Dome Station is also the terminus of the T Line, a short streetcar line that travels to Downtown Tacoma. The Tacoma Dome platform for the T Line (then called Tacoma Link) opened on August 22, 2003, after two years of construction. The station also served as the terminus of the Spirit of Washington Dinner Train, which ran south from Freighthouse Square toward Lake Kapowsin near Mount Rainier. The excursion train service began in August 2007 after relocating from the Eastside Rail Corridor, but closed in October due to poor ridership.

From 2000 to 2012, Tacoma Dome Station served as the southern terminus of the Sounder South Line (now the S Line). Sound Transit began construction on an extension to Lakewood in 2009, after years of delays due to cost increases and a lack of dedicated funding. 1.2 miles (1.9 km) of new tracks were built between Tacoma Dome Station and the existing Lakewood Subdivision, including an overpass over Pacific Avenue, as part of the extension. Sounder trains began serving South Tacoma and Lakewood stations on October 8, 2012, with some trips terminating at either Lakewood or Tacoma Dome.

== Amtrak station ==
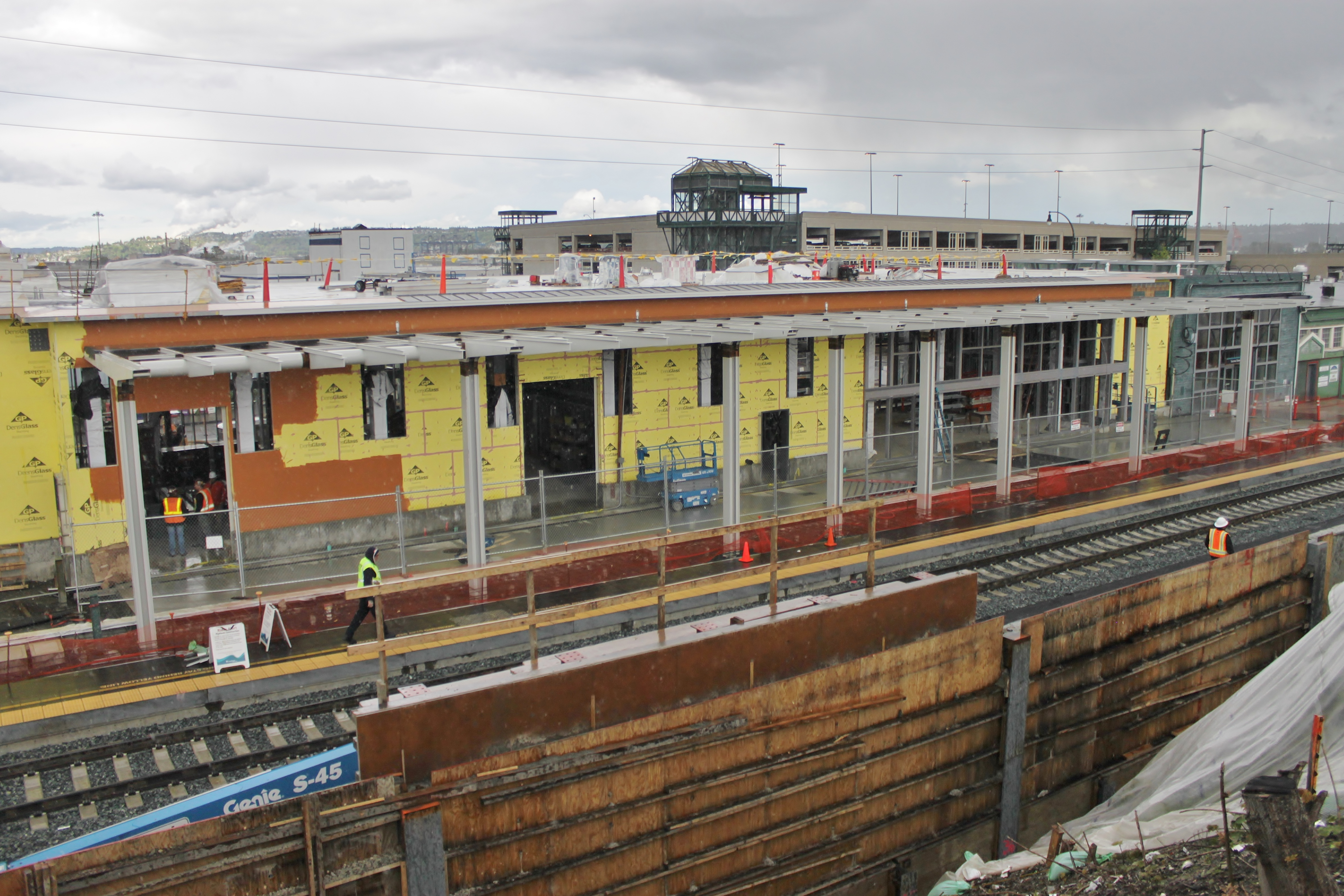
Amtrak construction at Tacoma Dome Station, seen from above the south platform in May 2017

In the 1990s, the Washington State Department of Transportation (WSDOT) identified Freighthouse Square as a potential site for a new Amtrak station serving Tacoma, with multi-modal connections in a single hub, to replace the Puyallup Avenue station opened in 1984. The new station would be built as part of the Point Defiance Bypass project, which would create an inland route for trains traveling between Tacoma and Lacey that would have reduced interference from freight traffic and mudslides. The bypass and new station were funded by the American Recovery and Reinvestment Act of 2009 and construction of the new tracks was formally approved by the Federal Railroad Administration (FRA) in early 2013. Freighthouse Square was selected as the preferred site by WSDOT and the FRA in October 2012, ahead of a parking lot to the west of Pacific Avenue.

A preliminary design for the new station was unveiled in December 2013, replacing 150 feet (46 m) of Freighthouse Square's west end with a structure clad in red corrugated metal. The design was met with public outcry over its unattractive design, labeled an "Amshack", and the proposed destruction of Freighthouse Square's facade for what The News Tribune termed an "architectural abomination". The backlash forced WSDOT to withdraw its design, hiring a Tacoma-based architecture firm and forming a citizen advisory committee to guide future station design. The advisory committee recommended building the station on the east end of the Freighthouse Square complex, but WSDOT determined it was too expensive to build and operate due to the elevation distance between the tracks and ground level; instead, WSDOT recommended a site to the west of the Sounder entrance that would be less costly to operate. The revised WSDOT proposal was well received by the public and approved by the advisory committee, along with recommendations for additional canopies and other features.

The Amtrak station's final design consists of a 180-foot-long (55 m) building to the west of the Sounder entrance, with 10,000 square feet (930 m^{2}) of interior space. The building features a 20-foot-high (6.1 m) ceiling with cross laminated timber columns and beams over the waiting area and public arcade, furnished with terrazzo floors, large glass walls, and public artwork. The public arcade includes vertical lift doors that allow it to become a sheltered outdoor space. The existing Sounder platform was extended by 650 feet (200 m) to accommodate the longer Coast Starlight trainset as part of the rebuilt Tacoma Trestle; a second platform and track was also built to allow additional train service. Early designs for the station also included a pedestrian bridge between the station's two platforms and the existing parking garages, but it was left unfunded. A monumental clock tower was also to be included in the station's design, but was rejected after a lack of interest from the public. The new design was approved by WSDOT, Amtrak, Sound Transit, and the City of Tacoma in early 2015 and sent to the FRA for final review.

In January 2016, WSDOT began advertising for demolition and construction bids, with plans to begin construction in spring. A month later, however, negotiations with the owner of Freighthouse Square over property acquisition and construction mitigation costs broke down and stalled the project. WSDOT attempted to condemn the property through a lawsuit, but came to an agreement with the property owner in March. Construction began in June 2016 and the station was declared substantially complete in May 2017. Sounder trains began using the new platform and track on November 13, 2017, causing temporary confusion for passengers because of the new arrangement. The station was dedicated on December 15, 2017, and Amtrak service on the Point Defiance Bypass began on December 18. The inaugural Amtrak trip on the new bypass derailed near DuPont, and service reverted indefinitely to the old route via the Puyallup Avenue station. WSDOT announced that it would halt the return of Amtrak trains to the bypass until full implementation of positive train control, which was completed and fully activated in March 2019. The restoration of Amtrak service on the Point Defiance Bypass was tentatively scheduled for 2020, after agreements with local officials and the arrival of new Talgo trainsets, but was delayed due to the COVID-19 pandemic. Amtrak service resumed at Tacoma Dome Station on November 18, 2021.

== Expansion ==
As part of the Sound Transit 3 expansion program approved by voters in 2016, Sound Transit plans to build a Link light rail extension from Federal Way to Tacoma by 2035. The line will terminate near Tacoma Dome Station, with a station integrated with the Freighthouse Square complex that could include a pedestrian bridge. Six station options at Tacoma Dome Station were evaluated in 2019 for the draft environmental impact statement, with elevated platforms above either Puyallup Avenue, 25th Street, or 26th Street. In 2025, the Tacoma City Council and Sound Transit both endorsed an option on the site of Freighthouse Square for the station.

The project was proposed as part of a failed ballot measure in 1995 and was cut from the successful 1996 Sound Move program. The Roads and Transit package in 2007 included funding for a SeaTac–Tacoma extension, but was also rejected; the smaller Sound Transit 2 proposal, approved by voters in 2008, funded construction to Federal Way and right of way acquisition for a future Tacoma extension until funding cutbacks during the Great Recession caused plans to be indefinitely delayed. The light rail extension was originally scheduled to be completed in 2030, but was delayed two years due to a program realignment plan approved in 2021 in response to a budget shortfall; the addition of 300 new surface parking stalls, approved as part of the plan, was also delayed to 2038.

== Station layout ==
Tacoma Dome Station is located on East 25th Street, between East D Street and East G Street, in the Dome District area southeast of Downtown Tacoma. The station consists of two buildings, three train platforms, a bus terminal, and two parking garages. The Sounder and Amtrak concourses are located on the south side of the street within Freighthouse Square, a former Milwaukee Road freight depot built in 1909 and later renovated into a shopping center. The station's Amtrak and Sounder platforms are situated on the south side of the building. The lone T Line platform is located on the north side of East 25th Street, adjacent to the station's two parking garages, with a capacity of 2,283 parking spaces as well as bicycle lockers and cages. The garage's south side also houses the Pierce Transit customer service center, while the north side on Puyallup Avenue (located downhill from the train station) has the bus platforms and Greyhound station. The bus platform, with bus bays on both sides, is connected to the train station and garage via a footbridge and stairway. Ticket vending machines are located inside the Sounder concourse, the customer service center, and at the bus platform. The station has restrooms located in the customer service center and the bus platform.

The station has two pieces of public art commissioned by Sound Transit during construction of the Sounder and Link stations. A kinetic sculpture by Luke Blackstone is contained within two steel tanks mounted above the parking garage's walkway. Several recycled artifacts representing Tacoma's history are scattered between the station's two parking garages as part of "Wild Parcel", a collaborative piece by Tacoma artists and landscape architects. An additional piece of public art was installed in January 2019 at the intersection of South Tacoma Way and Pacific Avenue as part of the Lakewood extension. Entitled "Gertie's Ghost", it is a 20-short-ton (18 t) steel structure that consists of eight octopus tentacles and was created by Oakland-based artists Sean Orlando and David Shulman.

== Services ==
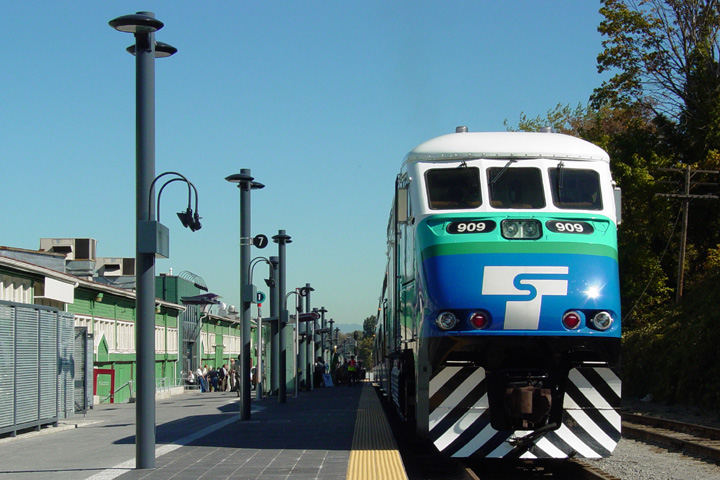
A Sounder train at Tacoma Dome Station, photographed in September 2003

Tacoma Dome Station is the intermodal connection between several transit modes, including intercity rail, commuter rail, light rail, and buses. The T Line terminates at the station, running north to Downtown Tacoma and the Hilltop area at frequencies of 12 to 20 minutes. It is served by 13 daily round-trips on Sounder commuter trains on the S Line, which run north to King Street Station in Seattle and south to Lakewood on weekdays. The station has eight daily roundtrips on two Amtrak routes: the Cascades to Vancouver, British Columbia, Portland, Oregon, and Eugene, Oregon; and the Coast Starlight to Los Angeles, California.

The station also has several express bus routes to Seattle and Lakewood operated by Sound Transit Express. Pierce Transit, the facility's owner and operator, has local routes that intersect at Tacoma Dome Station, traveling onward to Downtown Tacoma, North Tacoma, South Tacoma, Gig Harbor, Puyallup, and Federal Way. Greyhound runs intercity bus service from the station to Seattle and Portland. BoltBus service from the station began in March 2019 and served routes to Portland, Seattle, Bellingham, and Vancouver, British Columbia, until it was discontinued by Greyhound in 2021.
