= Bridge for Kids =

- Coordinates: 47°06′35″N 122°12′49″W
- Crosses: Carbon River
- Locale: Rocky Road NE, Orting, Washington
- Official name: Orting Emergency Evacuation Bridge

Characteristics
- Design: Suspension bridge with uneven footings
- Total length: 540 feet (160 m)
- Width: 20–30 feet (6.1–9.1 m)
- Clearance below: 18.5 feet (5.6 m)

Location
- Interactive map of Bridge for Kids

The Bridge for Kids is a bridge under construction as of August 2026 that will cross the Carbon River in Orting, Washington, about one mile (1.6 km) upstream of where it joins the Puyallup River. It will provide an emergency evacuation route for school children to escape a future lahar flow from Mount Rainier, consisting of an up to 10-meter-high (33 ft) flood of mud, rock and boulders.

== Background ==
Hazard map of Mount Rainier Lava flows and pyroclastic flows Electron Mudflow-sized event (generally large in size) National Lahar-sized event (generally moderate in size) Lahars not necessarily associated to volcanism (generally small) Flooding after lahar event Potential area of inundation from failure of the Alder Dam County boundary Mount Rainier National Park boundary City

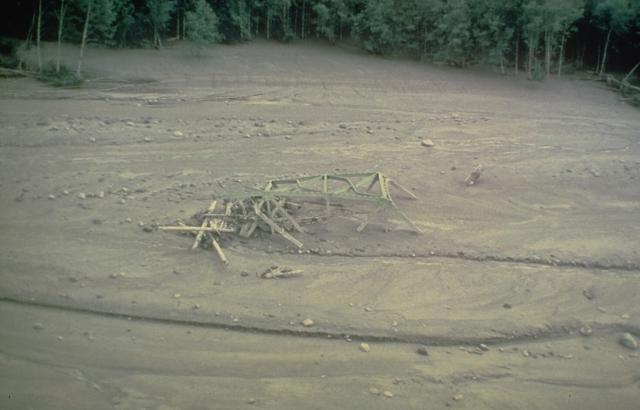
Steel highway bridge embedded in lahar from 1980 eruption of Mount St. Helens

Lahars from the Cascade Volcanoes are historically common. Orting is situated in the floodplain of the Puyallup River and on top of the debris field of past lahars from Mount Rainier, including the Osceola Mudflow. The Osceola Mudflow followed an eruption 5,600 years ago that left a horseshoe-shaped crater in Mount Rainier comparable to that of the 1980 eruption of Mount Saint Helens and deposited debris across a 212-square-mile (550 km^{2}) area as far as Commencement Bay on Puget Sound. Another event, the Electron Mudflow, produced a lahar that was 30 meters (98 ft) deep when it reached the Puget Sound lowland.

The current lahar risk is considered extremely high in Orting, with an estimated one in seven chance of a catastrophic event in a resident's lifetime. Land use planning and emergency management in Orting differs from that in surrounding Pierce County, allowing development and location of schools in this area.

The Mount Rainier Volcano Lahar Warning System has existed since 2000 to give residents in high-risk areas some advance warning of an approaching lahar, but evacuation drills in Orting have shown that motorized transportation (school buses) is not a viable option for removing students from the lahar zone due to road congestion and time factors.

Evacuation planning at Orting schools started in 1995, and it was then that the insufficiency of infrastructure began to be an issue. As of 2016, drills were showing student evacuation times via an existing 2-mile (3.2 km) foot route to still be in excess of the notification window.

== Bridge design ==
A yearlong design process was started by Pierce County in consultation with Washington State Department of Transportation and other agencies and a citizens' group in January, 2009, after considering other evacuation means such as pathways and a tunnel under the river. The bridge would be 20–30 feet (6.1–9.1 m) wide and accommodate 12,000 people in 30 minutes. Orting is estimated to have a 40 minute evacuation window after the Mount Rainier Volcano Lahar Warning System is activated.

Preliminary design renderings from 2014 show a pedestrian suspension bridge with stairsteps approaching a lower pier, and another pier 150 feet (46 m) higher on a ridge above Orting, near the community of Tehaleh. Part of the bridge deck would contain stairs and lie at a 40% slope.

== Construction ==
Construction began January 2025 and is set to complete in the summer of 2026.

== See also ==
- Mount Rainier § Geology
