= Isaac Jones (basketball) =

American basketball player (born 2000)

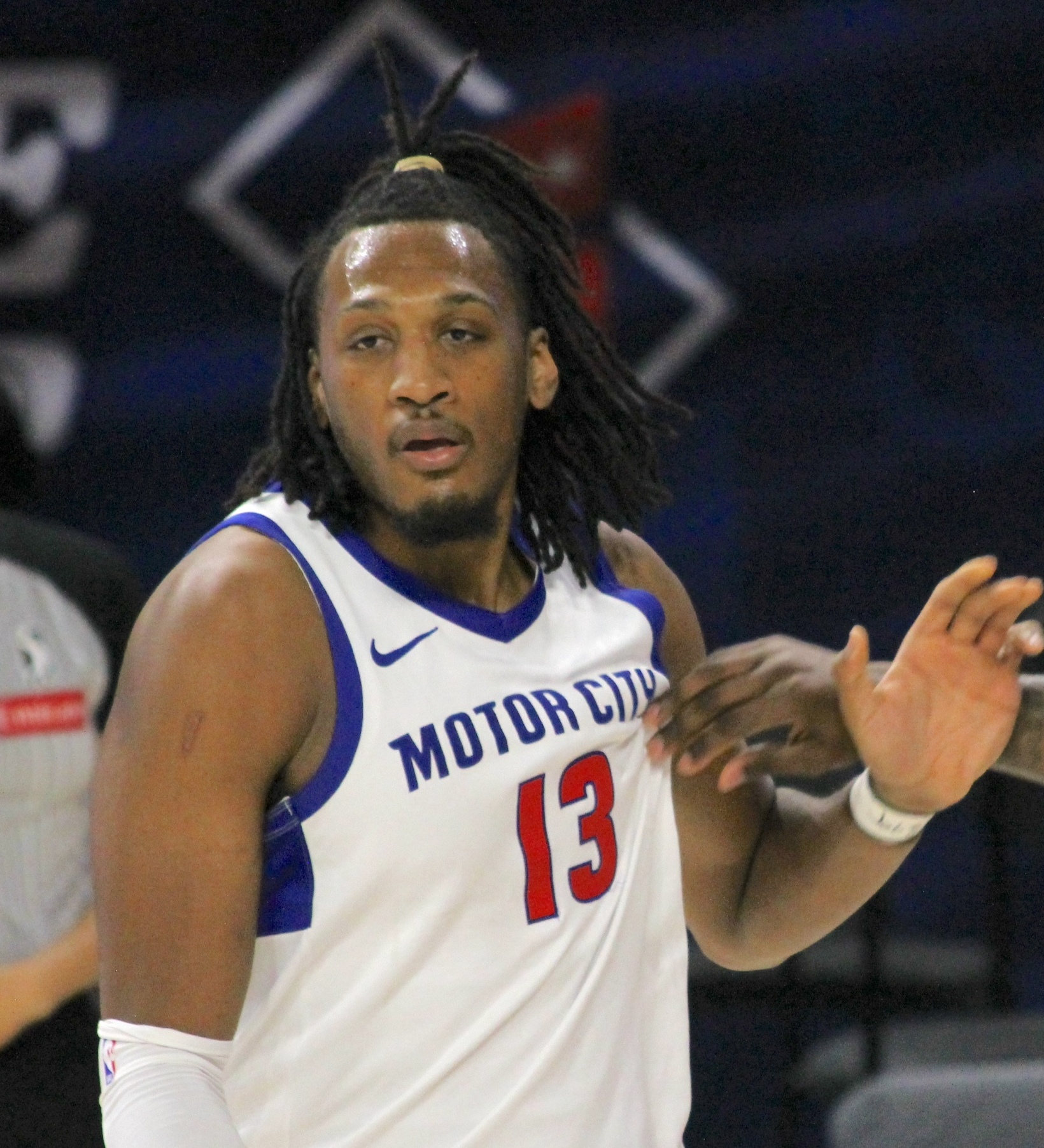
- Jones with the Motor City Cruise in 2026

No. 13 – Detroit Pistons
- Position: Power forward
- League: NBA

Personal information
- Born: July 11, 2000 (age 26) Spanaway, Washington, U.S.
- Listed height: 6 ft 8 in (2.03 m)
- Listed weight: 245 lb (111 kg)

Career information
- High school: Orting (Orting, Washington)
- College: Wenatchee Valley (2019–2022); Idaho (2022–2023); Washington State (2023–2024)
- NBA draft: 2024: undrafted
- Playing career: 2024–present

Career history
- 2024–2025: Sacramento Kings
- 2024–2025: →Stockton Kings
- 2025–present: Detroit Pistons
- 2025–present: →Motor City Cruise

Career highlights
- NBA G League champion (2025); All-NBA G League First Team (2026); All-NBA G League Third Team (2025); First-team All-Pac-12 (2024); Second-team All-Big Sky (2023); Big Sky Newcomer of the Year (2023)
- Stats at NBA.com
- Stats at Basketball Reference

Isaac Jones (born July 11, 2000) is an American professional basketball player for the Detroit Pistons of the National Basketball Association (NBA), on a two-way contract with the Motor City Cruise of the NBA G League. He played college basketball for the Wenatchee Valley Knights, Idaho Vandals and Washington State Cougars. Jones signed a two-way contract with the Sacramento Kings after going undrafted in the 2024 NBA Draft.

== Early life and high school career ==
Jones grew up in Spanaway, Washington and attended Orting High School. He entered high school at 5' 5" and had grown to 6' 4" by his senior year.

== College career ==
Jones did not initially attend college after graduating high school and worked at the loading dock at a pipe manufacturing company. He grew another five inches. A year later, Jones enrolled at Wenatchee Valley College at the urging of a former high school teammate, who was told he could play for the basketball team if he could also find another player who was at least 6' 8". In his final season with the Knights, he was named the Northwest Athletic Conference Player of the Year after averaging 25.3 points and 13.2 rebounds per game.

After three years at Wenatchee Valley College, Jones transferred to Idaho. He was named the Big Sky Conference Newcomer of the Year and second-team All-Big Sky after averaging 19.4 points and 7.8 rebounds per game. Following the end of the season, Jones entered the NCAA transfer portal.

Jones ultimately transferred to Washington State. He averaged 15.3 points and 7.6 rebounds per game and was named first-team All-Pac-12 Conference.

== Professional career ==
After going undrafted in the 2024 NBA draft, Jones signed a two-way contract with the Sacramento Kings on July 3, 2024. On March 22, 2025, Jones got converted from a two-way contract to a standard NBA contract. He made 40 appearances for the Kings during the 2024–25 NBA season, averaging 3.4 points, 1.4 rebounds and 0.3 assists.

Jones played in three games, including one start, for Sacramento during the 2025–26 NBA season, averaging one point, 0.7 rebounds and 0.3 assists. On November 4, 2025, Jones was waived by the Kings following the signing of Precious Achiuwa.

On November 6, 2025, Jones was claimed off waivers by the Detroit Pistons. Jones was waived by the Pistons on February 4, 2026. However, on February 10, Detroit re-signed Jones to a two-way contract.

== Career statistics ==
Legend
GP	Games played	GS	Games started	MPG	Minutes per game
FG%	Field goal percentage	3P%	3-point field goal percentage	FT%	Free throw percentage
RPG	Rebounds per game	APG	Assists per game	SPG	Steals per game
BPG	Blocks per game	PPG	Points per game	**Bold**	Career high

=== NBA ===
Year	Team	GP	GS	MPG	FG%	3P%	FT%	RPG	APG	SPG	BPG	PPG
2024–25	Sacramento	**40**	0	**7.6**	**.651**	**.375**	.639	**1.4**	**.3**	**.1**	**.3**	**3.4**
2025–26	Sacramento	3	**1**	5.7	.500	.000	.500	.7	**.3**	.0	.0	1.0
2025–26	Detroit	4	0	4.8	.400	.000	**1.000**	.8	.0	.0	**.3**	1.5
Career		47	1	7.2	.633	.300	.650	1.3	.3	.1	.2	3.0

=== College ===
==== NCAA Division I ====
Year	Team	GP	GS	MPG	FG%	3P%	FT%	RPG	APG	SPG	BPG	PPG
2022–23	Idaho	31	31	31.5	**.629**	**.316**	.676	**7.8**	**1.7**	**.6**	**1.1**	**19.4**
2023–24	Washington State	**35**	**34**	**31.7**	.575	.071	**.712**	7.6	1.5	.5	**1.1**	15.3
Career		66	65	31.6	.603	.212	.693	7.7	1.6	.6	1.1	17.2

==== NJCAA ====
Year	Team	GP	GS	MPG	FG%	3P%	FT%	RPG	APG	SPG	BPG	PPG
2019–20	Wenatchee Valley	29	20	22.2	.637	—	.636	7.9	.6	.3	.7	10.4
2020–21	Wenatchee Valley	10	10	**33.3**	.615	**.200**	.629	12.6	**3.4**	.5	.7	18.9
2021–22	Wenatchee Valley	**32**	**31**	32.8	**.695**	**.200**	**.728**	**13.2**	2.3	**.8**	**1.7**	**25.3**
Career		71	61	28.5	.668	.182	.694	11.0	1.8	.5	1.1	18.3
