= Johnson Taylor =

American politician

Johnson C. Taylor
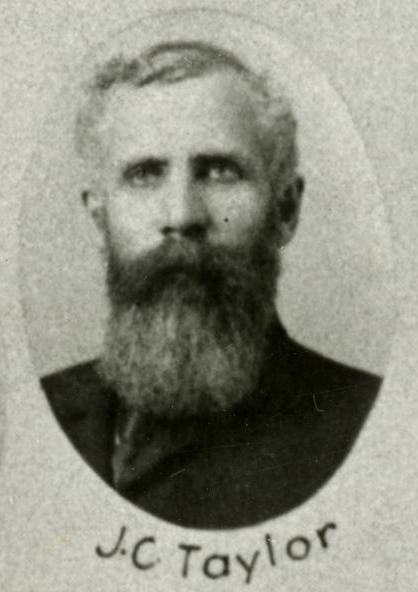
- Taylor in 1895

Member of the Washington House of Representatives for the 33rd district
- In office 1891–1893; 1895–1899

Member of the Washington House of Representatives for the 35th district
- In office 1927–1929

Personal details
- Born: November 27, 1849 Grant County, Wisconsin, United States
- Died: February 25, 1931 (aged 81) Orting, Washington, United States
- Party: Republican

Johnson C. Taylor (November 27, 1849 – February 25, 1931) was an American politician in the state of Washington. He served in the Washington House of Representatives.
