= Sumner High School (Washington) =

Location
- 1707 Main St; Sumner, Washington 98390; United States; 47°12′13″N 122°13′58″W

Information
- Type: Public high school
- Motto: Home of Puyallups Fathers
- Opened: 1911
- School district: Sumner–Bonney Lake School District
- Superintendent: Laurie Dent
- Principal: Jeff Baines
- Grades: 9-12
- Language: English
- Colors: Purple and gold
- Mascot: Spartan
- Rivals: Puyallup High School
- Feeder schools: Sumner Middle School; Lakeridge Middle School
- Website: shs.sumnersd.org

Sumner High School is a high school in Sumner, Washington, United States. It is one of two high schools in the Sumner–Bonney Lake School District, which serves Sumner and the neighboring city of Bonney Lake.

The high school's athletic teams are named the Spartans, with its colors being predominantly purple and gold. They are members of the South Puget Sound League and classified as a 4A school.

== Athletics program ==
Sumner High School's sports department participates in the Washington Interscholastic Activities Association's South Puget Sound League, at the 4A level. Sumner previously was at the 1A level through the 1950s and early 60s, briefly jumping up to 4A, before settling in the 3A classification level until 1977. Sumner transitioned to the 4A level from 1977 to 2005, was moved down to 3A until 2010, down again to 2A until 2014, back up to 3A in 2016, and returned to 4A for the 2017-2017 season.

Sports offered:

- Fall: cross country (coed), football (boys'), tennis (boys'), golf (girls'), soccer (girls'), swim & dive (girls'), and volleyball (girls')
- Winter: basketball (boys', girls'), wrestling (coed), swim & dive (boys'), gymnastics (girls'), bowling(girls'), and flag football (girls')
- Spring: track and field (boys', girls'), baseball (boys'), soccer (boys'), golf (boys'), lacrosse (boys', girls'), softball (girls'), and tennis (girls')

=== Sexual abuse allegations ===
In 2023, Sumner High School and its school district faced a lawsuit from a group of six students who had claimed they had been sexually abused by a teacher at the school. The lawsuit claims that the school district was aware of the sexual abuse, but did not take action until it was reported by news outlets. In April 2023, Sumner High School basketball coach Jacob Jackson was charged with child rape and molestation, and subsequently fired from his position; two lawsuits were filed against him prior to the firing. Allegations of abuse were made against Jackson as early as 2018. In April 2025, Jackson was sentenced to 40 years and three months in prison after he was convicted of 19 counts of various sex crimes against eight teenage boys.

== Campus ==
Sumner High School's campus consisted of a main building, single-story wings, eight detached portable classrooms, and standalone athletic and arts facilities.

The district decided to expand the school through 3 phases of construction. In 2023, Phase 1 of the campus modernization was completed, adding a three-story building with 18 classrooms, a library, and a cafeteria. Construction began on Phase 2 in July 2026, which added a West Building adjacent to the Phase 1 for the general classrooms, Career and Technical Education (CTE) labs, and a band room, are expected to be completed by Fall 2028. Following Phase 2, a future Phase 3 build-out funded by the same 2024 voter-approved measure will complete the campus expansion by Fall 2032. This final phase will introduce a new Performing Arts Center, a gymnasium, an aquatic facility, athletic courts, and multi-use turf fields.

=== Sunset Stadium ===
Sunset Stadium is a stadium attached to Sumner High School. It was first built in 1959 and was remodeled in 2001–2002. Its naming rights are held by Sunset Chevrolet, a car dealership located in downtown Sumner. It is used for American football, soccer, lacrosse, and track and field.

== Notable alumni ==
- Jacob Bresnahan - (class of 2023) professional baseball player
- Nick Hagadone - (class of 2004) former MLB player (Cleveland Indians)
