= Ian Shoemaker =

American football coach

Current position
- Title: Offensive coordinator & quarterbacks coach
- Team: Idaho
- Conference: Big Sky

Biographical details
- Born: Graham, Washington, U.S.

Playing career

Football
- 1993–1996: Grinnell

Baseball
- 1993–1996: Grinnell

Coaching career (HC unless noted)

Football
- 1997–1999: Western Washington (GA)
- 2000 (spring): Saint Mary (KS) (OC)
- 2000–2002: Minot State (PGC/QB/WR)
- 2003–2005: Kenyon (AHC/OC/QB)
- 2006–2007: Baldwin Wallace (OC/QB)
- 2008–2013: St. Cloud State (Co-OC/QB)
- 2014–2018: Central Washington
- 2019–2021: Eastern Washington (OC/QB)
- 2022: Hawaii (OC/QB)
- 2023: Hawaii (OC/TE)
- 2024–2025: Grand Valley State (OC/QB)
- 2026–present: Idaho (OC/QB)

Softball
- 1997–1999: Western Washington (asst.)

Baseball
- 2000: Saint Mary (KS)
- 2001–2002: Minot State

Head coaching record
- Overall: 38–16 (college football)
- Tournaments: 0–1 (NCAA D-II playoffs)

Accomplishments and honors

Championships
- 2 GNAC (2017–2018)

Awards
- Don Hanson Super Region 3 Coach of the Year (2017); GNAC Coach of the Year (2017)

Ian Shoemaker is an American college football coach and former player. He is the offensive coordinator and quarterbacks coach for University of Idaho, positions he has held since 2026. He was the head football coach at Central Washington from 2014 until 2018.

== Coaching career ==
=== Western Washington ===
Following Shoemaker's playing career, he joined the staff at Western Washington as an offensive graduate assistant from 1997 to 1999. He coached the tight ends and running backs. During the spring, Shoemaker was also an assistant softball coach for the university.

=== Minot State ===
In 2000, Shoemaker spent the spring as the offensive coordinator at Saint Mary before leaving to become the pass game coordinator, quarterbacks and wide receivers coach at Minot State. He held this position from 2000 through 2002. During this time, Shoemaker was also the head baseball coach at St. Mary in 2000, and the head baseball coach at Minot State in 2001 and 2002.

=== Division III ===
From 2003 to 2005, Shoemaker was the assistant head coach, offensive coordinator, and quarterbacks coach at Kenyon College in Gambier, Ohio. While at Kenyon, Shoemaker's offensive squads broke 13 school and individual records. He then moved on to Baldwin-Wallace as the offensive coordinator and quarterbacks coach for the 2006 and 2007 seasons.

=== St. Cloud State ===
Shoemaker was the co-offensive coordinator and quarterbacks coach at St. Cloud State from 2009 to 2013. Under his guidance, the Husky offensive set multiple school records, including single-season records for points scored in a season, total touchdowns scored, pass efficiency, pass completions, yards per pass, and total offense.

=== Central Washington ===
On December 26, 2013, Shoemaker was hired for his first football head coaching opportunity at Central Washington, an NCAA Division II program in Ellensburg, Washington. From 2014 to 2018, Shoemaker led the program to a 38–16 overall record, two Great Northwest Athletic Conference championships (2017 & 2018), and an NCAA playoff appearance (2017). He was named the Don Hansen Super Region 3 Coach of the Year and the GNAC coach of the year in 2017, as well as, with his staff, developing 8 All-Americans over his five-year tenure.

=== Eastern Washington ===
In 2019, Shoemaker was hired to his first NCAA FCS position, when he was hired as the offensive coordinator and quarterbacks coach at Eastern Washington.

In his first season, Shoemaker's offense led the NCAA FCS in total offense with an average of 524.8 yards per game, and quarterback Eric Barriere was a finalist for the Walter Payton Award, which is given to the country's top FCS player.

In 2020, Eastern Washington's offense continued to light up the scoreboard, finishing top 5 in the country in scoring (2nd), total offense (3rd), and passing (5th).

In his 3rd and final season at EWU, Shoemaker led the offense to a fast start once again. Through seven games, the Eagles were averaging 54 points a game, over 628 yards a game, and the team was 7–0, but after two straight losses in which the offense was held to nearly half of their season averages, Shoemaker resigned, stating it was a mutual separation that was in the best interest of the team.

=== Hawaii ===
Prior to the 2022 season, Shoemaker was hired as the offensive coordinator and quarterbacks coach on Timmy Chang's inaugural staff at Hawaii. It was his first experience at the Division I FBS level. During spring practices, Shoemaker worked with Chang to install an offense incorporating elements of the run-and-shoot and run-pass option concepts. Hawaii finished the 2022 season with a 3–10 record, averaging 342.8 yards and 19.8 points per game. In 2023, Shoemaker served as the co-offensive coordinator and tight ends coach. The Rainbow Warriors finished 5–8 that season, averaging 352.5 yards and 21.4 points per game.

=== Grand Valley State ===
In February 2024, Shoemaker was hired as the offensive coordinator and quarterbacks coach at Grand Valley State, replacing Matt Vitzthum. In his first season, the Lakers went 11–2 and advanced to the second round of the NCAA Division II playoffs before losing to Harding, 44–26. The team's offense totaled 5,035 yards and averaged 29.5 points per game in 2024. In 2025, Grand Valley State averaged 404.9 yards and 37.5 points per game. The Lakers went 18–5 during Shoemaker's two seasons with the program.

=== Idaho ===
On December 16, 2025, Idaho announced that it had hired Shoemaker as its offensive coordinator and quarterbacks coach. He began the position in 2026.

== Playing career ==
Shoemaker was a four-year starter in both football and baseball at Grinnell College. He was the football Most Valuable Player and Offensive Back of the Year in football and set school records for home runs in a season and career in baseball.

== Personal life ==
After graduating from Orting High School in Orting, Washington, Shoemaker earned a degree in psychology from Grinnell, and then a master's degree in Sport Psychology from Western Washington. Shoemaker's brother, Javid, played safety for Eastern Washington from 2001 to 2004 after graduating from Bethel High School in Spanaway, Washington, in 2000.

== Head coaching record ==
=== College football ===
Year	Team	Overall	Conference	Standing	Bowl/playoffs	AFCA^{#}
Central Washington Wildcats (Great Northwest Athletic Conference) (2014–2018)
2014	Central Washington	7–4	4–2	T–2nd		
2015	Central Washington	5–5	3–3	T–3rd		
2016	Central Washington	7–3	6–2	2nd		
2017	Central Washington	11–1	8–0	1st	L NCAA Division II Second Round	7
2018	Central Washington	8–3	7–1	T–1st		18
Central Washington:		38–16	28–8			
Total:		38–16				
National championship Conference title Conference division title or championship game berth
