= Orting High School =

Coordinates: 47°06′08″N 122°12′34″W

Location
- 360 Washington Ave N Orting, Washington 98360; United States

Information
- Type: Public secondary
- School district: Orting School District
- NCES School ID: 530645000953
- Principal: Matt Carlson
- Teaching staff: 40.10 (FTE)
- Grades: Grades 9, 10, 11, and 12
- Enrollment: 881 (2023-2024)
- Student to teacher ratio: 21.97
- Campus: Small City
- Colors: Red, White & Black
- Mascot: Cardinals
- Website: Orting H.S.

Orting High School is a high school located in Orting, Washington that serves students from grades 9–12 in the Orting and surrounding areas. The mascot is the Cardinal, and the Orting Cardinals was a member of the Nisqually League. OHS is now part of the SPSL 2A league.

== Layout ==
Orting HS's Main Building has 2 floors each with 11 rooms. It has a newer student commons built later than the Main Building. There are two staircases on each end of the Main Building. There are 7 "Lettered" portables to the right of the Main Building. There is also a West Wing, a separate building with one hallway and 8 classrooms. The West Wing was returned to the nearby elementary school at the start of the 2025-2026 school year. The gyms are a walk away from the school in a separate building, there are three gyms, One main gym, One small gym (currently used as a weights class) and a nearby Wrestling gym with entry only available on the exterior. There are 5 "numbered" portables to the right of the gymnasiums. There are 4 "Island" portables (each with 2 classes) across the parking lot from the West Wing. Included among these buildings is three parking lots. Teachers get the lot in front of the Main Building. a Senior exclusive parking lot in front of the gym and a guest parking lot closer to the commons. Other students may park down by the Old track, the baseball field and softball field.

== History ==
The first graduating class of Orting High School was in 1911. There was only one student to graduate that year.

Orting High was built in its current location in 1988, the previous location was built in 1951.

Many of Orting High School alumni and recently graduated students have enlisted in the United States Marine Corps, leading to Orting being the high school with the most Marine alumni in Pierce County. However, as of recent years the number of students enlisting in the Marine Corps has declined steadily.

== Notable alumni ==
- Casey Carrigan (1969)- Olympic pole vaulter
- Ian Shoemaker (1993) - college football coach, Grand Valley State Lakers
- Isaac Jones (2019) - basketball player, Sacramento Kings

== Sports ==
The Orting Cardinals' wrestling team generally has some of the best performing wrestlers (in their respective weight classes) within Washington. The Cardinals' football team are usually within the Top 20 of the Division 2A schools.
