= Bonney Lake High School =

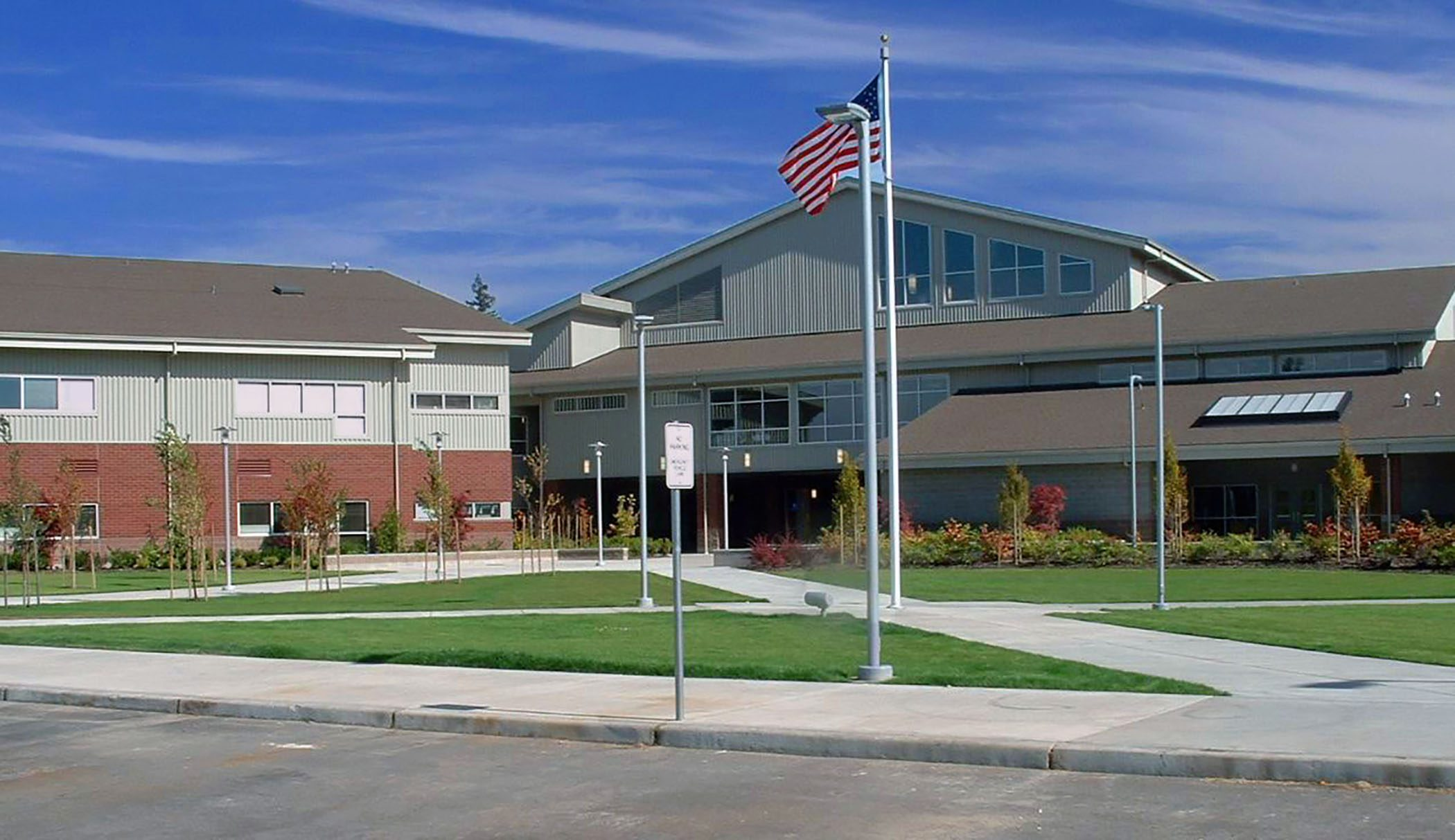
- 10920 199th Ave Ct E Bonney Lake, Washington 98391; United States

Information
- Type: Public
- Established: 2005
- School district: Sumner School District
- Principal: Anthony Clarke
- Teaching staff: 79.77 (on an FTE basis)
- Enrollment: 1,676 (2023–2024)
- Student to teacher ratio: 21.01
- Colors: Teal & Black
- Athletics conference: Pierce County 4A, 2024-Present
- Mascot: Panthers
- Website: https://www.sumnersd.org/blhs

Bonney Lake High School is a public high school in Bonney Lake, Washington, United States, in the Sumner School District.

== History ==
The Sumner School Board initially proposed a new high school in Bonney Lake in February 1999, to alleviate overcrowding at Sumner High School and also to qualify for increased state funding available for four-year high schools. The District formed a planning committee consisting of community leaders and district personnel to make programming decisions for the new school, and to work with architects on building design. Voters had approved a $44 million bond issue for Sumner High School stadium improvements and the new high school in Bonney Lake.

The Sumner School Board delayed naming of the new school because the city of Bonney Lake refused to require impact fees of the builders, potentially costing the district hundreds of thousand dollars. The district temporarily referred to the new school as "high school number 2". The school board eventually voted 4-1 to name the school after the City of Bonney Lake, ending the months-long controversy.

Bonney Lake High School opened in September 2005, and held a grand opening celebration on December 6, 2005. In October 2006 the roof of the new building began to leak, and it was replaced by Garco Construction of Spokane, the original contractor of the building.

The school joined "High Schools That Work", a program of reforms that include "professional training, planning tools, surveys and assessments to help start the programs". In January 2006, Bonney Lake High School opened a branch of Boeing Employees' Credit Union and an in-school ATM.

== Athletics ==
The athletic teams at Bonney Lake High School are known as the Panthers. During the 2012-13 school year the Panthers won their first state championship when the boys soccer team beat Shorecrest High School 1-0 in the state championship game. The 2016-17 boys wrestling team won the school's second state championship. The following year the girls softball team won the school's third state championship when they beat Snohomish High School 8-5 in the state championship game.

== Notable alumni ==
- Jordin Andrade - Two time Olympic hurdler representing Cape Verde.
