= Ryan House =

Historic house in Washington, United States

- U.S. National Register of Historic Places
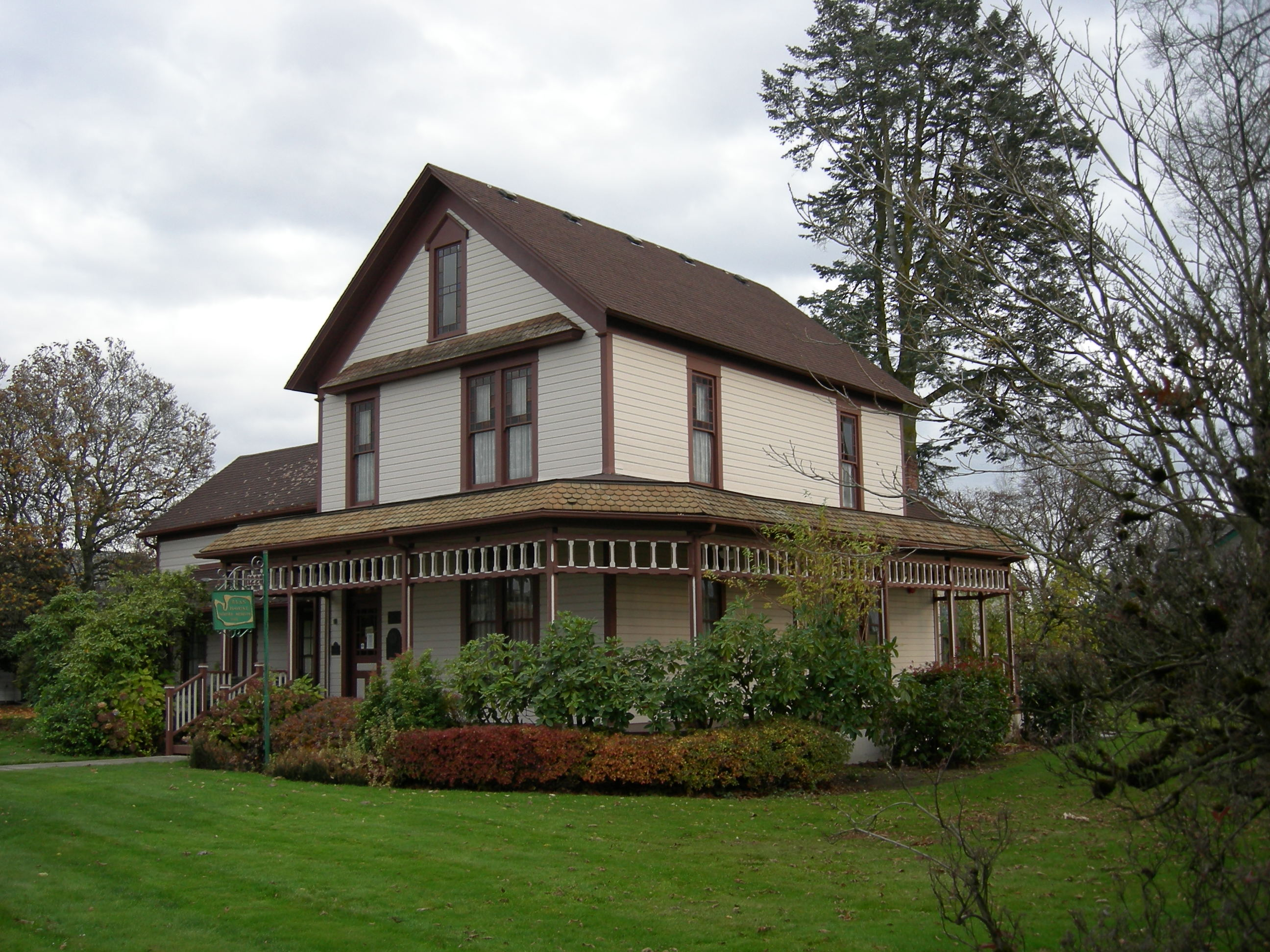

- Location within Washington (state)
- Interactive map showing the location of Ryan House
- Location: Sumner, Washington
- Coordinates: 47°12′11.23″N 122°14′14.58″W
- Built: 1875
- Architect: Ryan, George; Avery, John
- Architectural style: Classical Revival
- Demolished: July 25, 2025
- NRHP reference No.: 76001900
- Added to NRHP: June 30, 1976

The Ryan House was a historic building in Sumner, Washington, United States that was once used as a museum.

The house was built by Fred Seaman as a one-room cabin. In 1872, George Ryan bought the property. He added onto the house in 1875 and 1885.

In 1926, Ryan's family donated the property to the town of Sumner for use as the Sumner Public Library. The building housed the library from 1926 to 1979, and now houses the Sumner Historical Society, which operates the house as the Ryan House Museum.

The Ryan House was home to the Sumner Historical Society for several years, but neglect to the upkeep on the house by the City of Sumner has led to issues.

While plans were made to accomplish a renovation, an outside renovation firm was hired, and determined in their report that it was not suitable for renovation, or that the proposed renovation would cost over $2 million.

On September 18, 2023, the Sumner City Council voted to demolish the Ryan House, and put a park in its place, without significant input from the local community.

Negotiations were made to prevent the building's demolition. A local group, "Save the Ryan House" had been formed by a group of citizens. In March 2024, a Pierce County Superior Court judge ruled against the city, finding that sufficient notice was not given to the public to move forward with the demolition and that it could not proceed. Nevertheless, the Ryan House was demolished on 25 July 2025.

== Sources ==
- Ryan, Amy M., The Sumner Story, copyright 1988, Sumner Historical Society
