= Sumner–Bonney Lake School District =

School district in Washington, United States

Address
- 1202 Wood Avenue Sumner, Washington, 98390; United States

District information
- Type: Public
- Grades: PreK–12
- NCES District ID: 5308610

Students and staff
- Students: 9,793
- Teachers: 514.29 (FTE)
- Staff: 332.57 (FTE)
- Student–teacher ratio: 19.04

Other information
- Website: www.sumnersd.org

Sumner–Bonney Lake School District is a school district in Washington, that serves the cities of Bonney Lake, Edgewood, Sumner, and unincorporated areas of east Pierce County, Washington. The district has 14 schools, a family support center, a district athletic complex, two performing arts centers, public gymnasiums, and a recreation department.

== Boundary ==
The district includes the majority of Sumner and most of Alderton, Bonney Lake and North Puyallup. The district also includes portions of Edgewood, Lake Tapps, McMillin, Pacific (Pierce County portion), Prairie Ridge, and Tehaleh.

== Elementary schools ==
- Bonney Lake Elementary, Bonney Lake, established in 1961 (renovated in 2010)
- Crestwood Elementary, Bonney Lake, established in 1995
- Daffodil Valley Elementary, Sumner, established in 1999
- Donald Eismann Elementary, Tehaleh, established in 2010
- Emerald Hills Elementary, Bonney Lake, established in 1979 (rebuilt in 2019)
- Liberty Ridge Elementary, Bonney Lake Established in 1998
- Maple Lawn Elementary, Sumner
- McAlder Elementary, Puyallup, Permanently closed in 2012, and now being used by Cascade Christian Schools
- Tehaleh Heights Elementary, Tehaleh, established 2018
- Victor Falls Elementary, Bonney Lake

== Middle schools ==
- Lakeridge Middle School, Bonney Lake, established in 1980 as Lakeridge Junior High and rebuilt in 2010
- Mountain View Middle School, Bonney Lake, established 1998
- Sumner Middle School, Sumner, originally Sumner Junior High and renamed in 2006; renovated in 2012

== High schools ==
- Bonney Lake High School, Bonney Lake, established in 2005
- Sumner High School, Sumner, expanded in 1954 and 2023
