= Electron Lahar =

Mudflow in Washington, USA

The Electron Lahar, also known as the Electron Mudflow, was a lahar in the U.S. state of Washington that descended from the summit and sunset amphitheater on Mount Rainier. The event is estimated to have taken place in 1507, likely during late summer. The lahar was named after the unincorporated community of Electron.

The extent of the Electron mudflow was about 34 miles (55 km) from Mount Rainier. It covered approximately 13 square miles (34 km^{2}) in the Puyallup Valley, and was more than 26 feet (7.9 m) thick at its deepest point.

The dating of the lahar is based on buried Douglas fir trees found in the area that were killed in the mudflow. Radiocarbon dating of the trees initially indicated a date around 1500. For those trees that still had bark preserved, the outer ring of growth would correspond to the year in which the tree died. Using dendochronology to compare these tree rings to similar tree rings in the region of known age, researchers were able to more precisely identify the event to 1507.

== See also ==
- Osceola Mudflow
