= Mount Rainier Volcano Lahar Warning System =

Volcanic evacuation warning system

Hazard map of Mount Rainier Lava flows and pyroclastic flows Electron Mudflow-sized event (generally large in size) National Lahar-sized event (generally moderate in size) Lahars not necessarily associated to volcanism (generally small) Flooding after lahar event Potential area of inundation from failure of the Alder Dam County boundary Mount Rainier National Park boundary City

The Mount Rainier Volcano Lahar Warning System consists of two separate components, operating in tandem: Acoustic Flow Monitors (AFM) and the All Hazard Alert Broadcast (AHAB) sirens. The AFM system was developed by the United States Geological Survey (USGS) in 1998 and is now maintained by Pierce County Emergency Management. The purpose of the warning system is to assist in the evacuation of residents in the river valleys around Mount Rainier, a volcano in Washington, in the event of a lahar. Pierce County works in partnership with the USGS, the Pacific Northwest Seismic Network (PNSN), Washington Military Department's Emergency Management Division, and South Sound 9-1-1 to monitor and operate the system.

== History ==
Mount Rainier is an active volcano in Washington. It has previously buried sections of the surrounding river valleys in a volcanic mudflow, called a lahar. The Puyallup River Valley is at greatest risk. Tens of thousands of people live in areas that may have as little as 40 minutes to as much as three hours to move to safety once a large lahar is detected, so the system is robust, warnings are disseminated promptly and widely, and people in harm's way are taught how to respond to the warnings and take protective actions.

Geologists consider Mount Rainier the most dangerous mountain in the United States, and the USGS has estimated there is a one-in-seven chance of a catastrophic lahar at Mount Rainier occurring in the next 75 years.

Pierce County Emergency Management and the USGS have made plans to upgrade the AFM detection technology, expand the siren component, and are now working on a multiyear project to enhance the system.

== Components ==
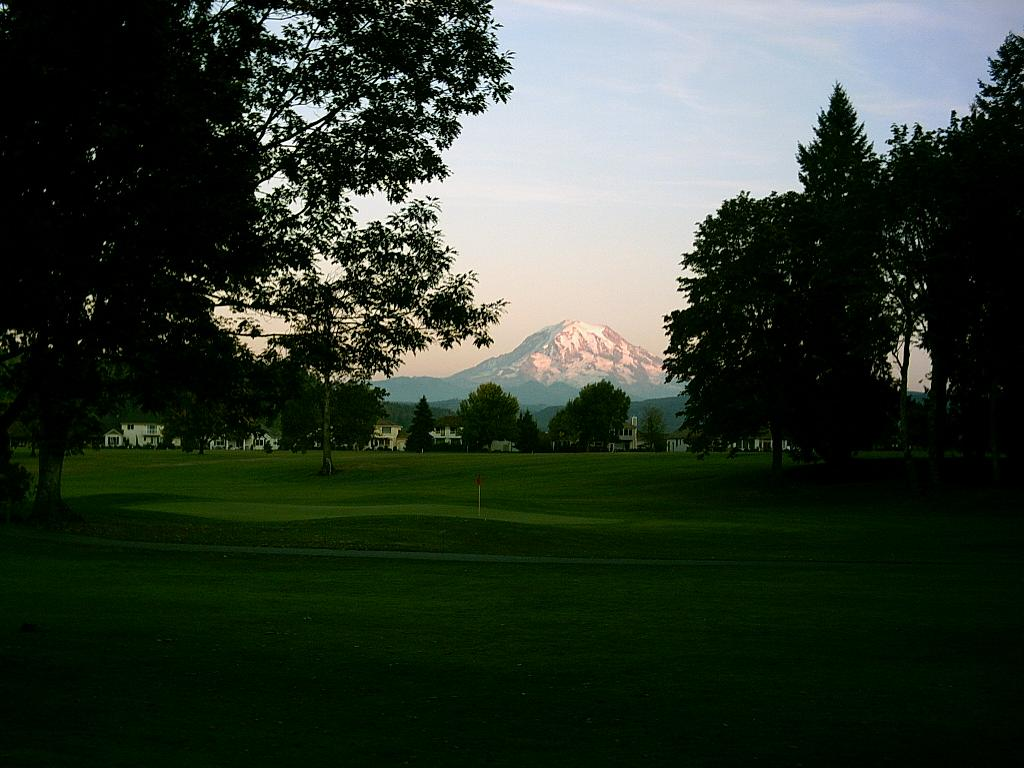
Mount Rainier as seen from the High Cedars Golf Course in Orting, bordering the Carbon River

Acoustic Flow Monitors (AFM): An automated system detects lahar flows by using a network of small sensors called acoustic flow monitors (AFMs) embedded underground to measure ground vibrations made by passing lahars. Computer base stations located in the Washington State Emergency Operations Center (EOC) continuously analyze signals from the field stations. Upon detection of a lahar, the computer alerts local 24–hour emergency monitoring and notification centers, who initiate the warning component of the system. Warning messages would trigger immediate, preplanned emergency-response actions.

All Hazard Alert Broadcast (AHAB) Sirens: The Mount Rainier Lahar Siren project is part of an overall emergency communications system for Pierce County. The focus for the sirens is to warn the residents in the Puyallup River Valley of the need to evacuate due to a volcanic disaster from the Mount Rainier Volcano. Over 40 Federal Signal Modulator sirens are strategically placed through the valley. When imminent volcanic danger threatens, the sirens will be activated, utilizing the emergency “wailing” tone. Citizens will be advised to evacuate the valley floor and head to higher ground by vehicle or foot. The outdoor lahar warning sirens are tested at noon on the first Monday of months January–September, November–December, using the “Westminster Chime” tone for eight seconds followed by a voice announcement to ensure the sirens are working. Every October on the first Monday at Noon, the emergency warbling “wail” tone is tested for approximately five minutes. During a real volcanic event or other disaster, the sirens will continuously “wail” in 5 minute increments to warn residents and tourists to evacuate. They will continue to wail until the batteries die or the sirens themselves are destroyed by the lahar.

== Warning process ==
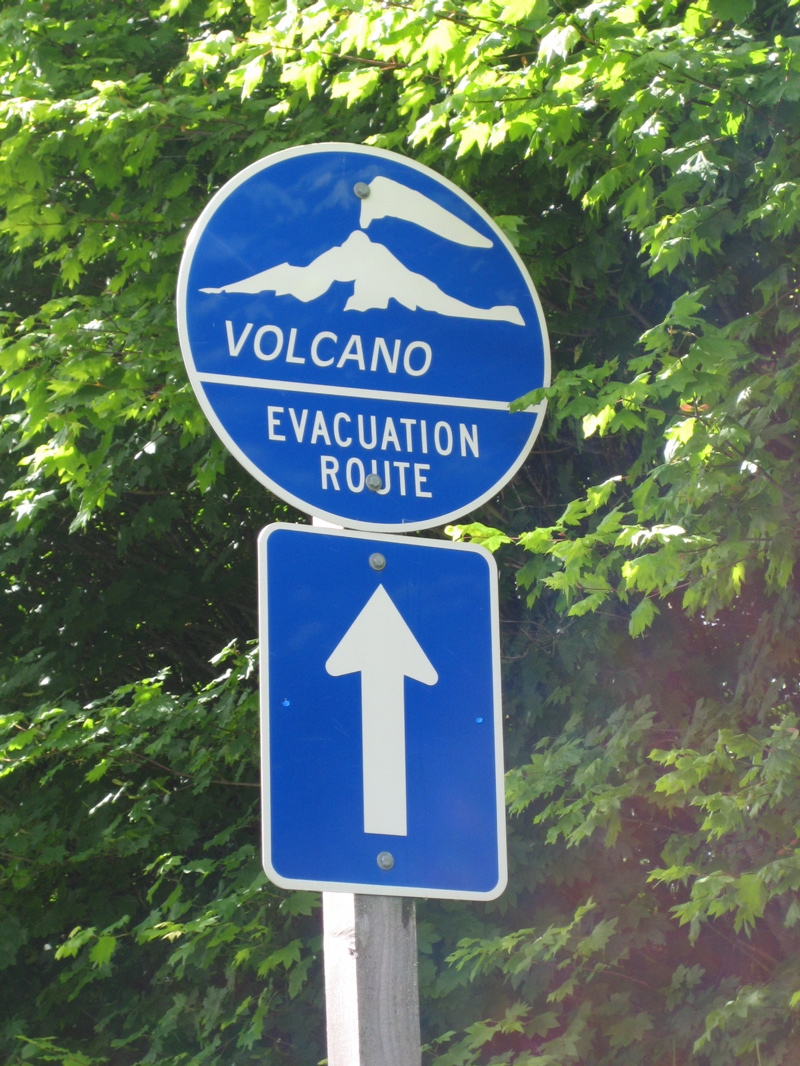
One of many emergency evacuation route signs in case of volcanic eruption or lahar around Mount Rainier

- The Washington Military Department's Emergency Management Division and South Sound 9-1-1 house the AFM detection system and are responsible for initiating notification of a lahar.
- Once initiated, television and radio stations, such as NOAA Weather Radio, would broadcast alerts. Forty-two sirens scattered in cities from Orting to the Port of Tacoma would activate.
- Residents can sign up for alert notifications via Pierce County ALERT, a free service that allows fire, police and other agencies dealing with emergency response to send out accurate and up-to-date information.

== Cultural references ==
- An episode in the 2006 History Channel series Mega Disasters, titled "American Volcano", was about the impacts of a catastrophic lahar resulting from the eruption of Mount Rainier.
- An episode of It Could Happen Tomorrow discusses what would happen if Mount Rainier erupted and caused a lahar.
