= Sumner, Washington =

- City
- Location of Sumner, Washington
- Coordinates: 47°13′30″N 122°14′48″W
- Country: United States
- State: Washington
- County: Pierce

Government
  - Type: Mayor–council
  - Mayor: Carla Bowman

Area
  - Total: 7.65 sq mi (19.82 km^{2})
  - Land: 7.53 sq mi (19.51 km^{2})
  - Water: 0.12 sq mi (0.31 km^{2})
- Elevation: 52 ft (16 m)

Population (2020)
  - Total: 10,621
  - Density: 1,384.4/sq mi (534.53/km^{2})
- Time zone: UTC-8 (Pacific (PST))
  - Summer (DST): UTC-7 (PDT)
- ZIP codes: 98352, 98390
- Area code: 253
- FIPS code: 53-68435
- GNIS feature ID: 2412001
- Website: sumnerwa.gov

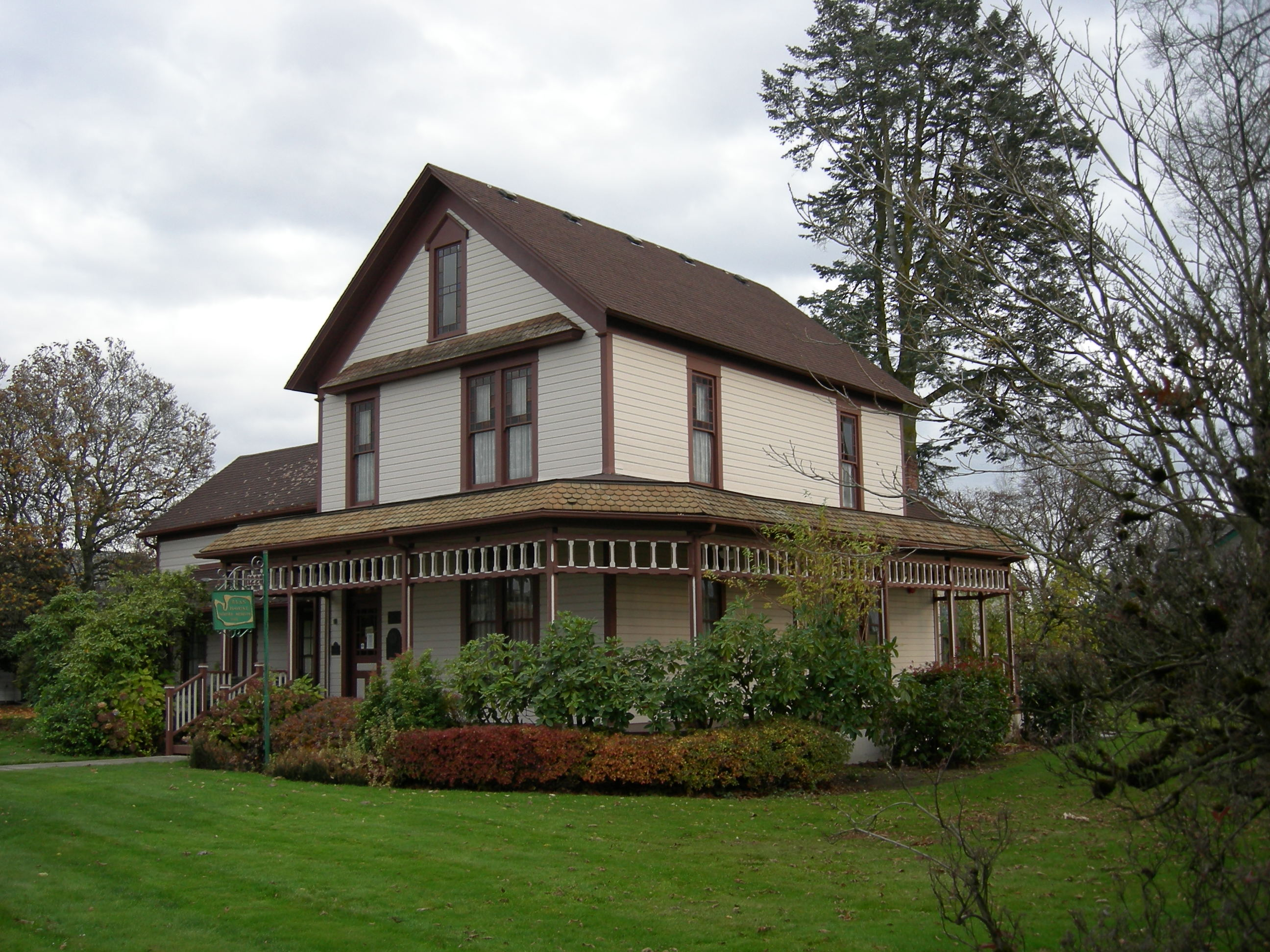
Sumner's Ryan House (home of the city's historical museum) is on the National Register of Historic Places.

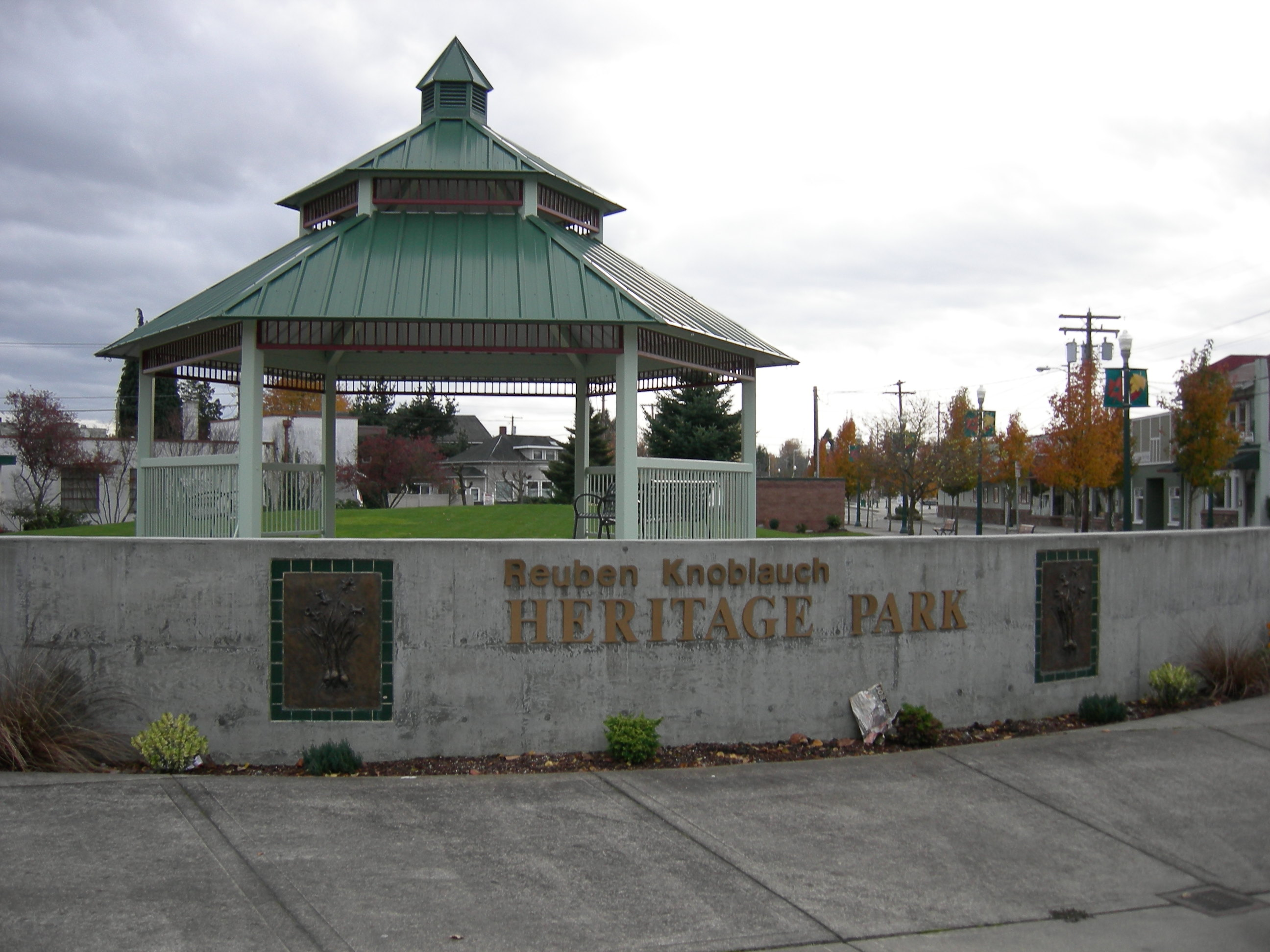
Reuben Knoblauch Heritage Park near the Sounder commuter rail station that connects Sumner to Seattle and Tacoma

Sumner is a city in northern Pierce County, Washington, United States. The population was 10,621 at the 2020 census. Nearby cities include Puyallup to the west, Auburn to the north, and Bonney Lake to the east.

== History ==
Sumner was founded in 1853 as Stuck Junction and platted in 1883 by George H. Ryan, in anticipation of a stop on the Northern Pacific Railway. The town was named "Franklin" until 1891, when the Post Office Department requested that the name be changed to avoid confusion with similarly named towns. The name of abolitionist Senator Charles Sumner was chosen for the town after a lottery.

== Geography ==
According to the United States Census Bureau, the city has a total area of 7.62 square miles (19.74 km^{2}), of which 7.51 square miles (19.45 km^{2}) is land and 0.11 square miles (0.28 km^{2}) is water.

Sumner, along with Orting and Puyallup, lie in the lahar hazard zone for Mount Rainier. During the Osceola Mudflow, dated to approximately 5,600 years before present, a 300-foot (91 m) deposit covered a portion of the city's modern location.

== Economy ==
Dillanos Coffee Roasters is based in Sumner.

REI maintains corporate offices and a large distribution center in Sumner.

== Demographics ==
Historical population
| Census | Pop. | Note | %± |
|---|---|---|---|
| 1890 | 580 | | — |
| 1900 | 531 | | −8.4% |
| 1910 | 892 | | 68.0% |
| 1920 | 1,499 | | 68.0% |
| 1930 | 1,967 | | 31.2% |
| 1940 | 2,140 | | 8.8% |
| 1950 | 2,816 | | 31.6% |
| 1960 | 3,156 | | 12.1% |
| 1970 | 4,325 | | 37.0% |
| 1980 | 4,936 | | 14.1% |
| 1990 | 6,281 | | 27.2% |
| 2000 | 8,504 | | 35.4% |
| 2010 | 9,451 | | 11.1% |
| 2020 | 10,621 | | 12.4% |
U.S. Decennial Census; 2020 Census

=== 2020 census ===
As of the 2020 census, Sumner had a population of 10,621 and a median age of 37.8 years.

22.8% of residents were under the age of 18 and 16.6% were 65 years of age or older; for every 100 females there were 92.2 males, and for every 100 females age 18 and over there were 88.6 males.

100.0% of residents lived in urban areas, while 0.0% lived in rural areas.

There were 4,317 households in Sumner, of which 30.4% had children under the age of 18 living in them. Of all households, 42.4% were married-couple households, 17.9% were households with a male householder and no spouse or partner present, and 30.2% were households with a female householder and no spouse or partner present. About 30.2% of all households were made up of individuals and 12.7% had someone living alone who was 65 years of age or older.

There were 4,492 housing units, of which 3.9% were vacant. The homeowner vacancy rate was 0.7% and the rental vacancy rate was 3.4%.

Racial composition as of the 2020 census
| Race | Number | Percent |
|---|---|---|
| White | 7,866 | 74.1% |
| Black or African American | 174 | 1.6% |
| American Indian and Alaska Native | 123 | 1.2% |
| Asian | 328 | 3.1% |
| Native Hawaiian and Other Pacific Islander | 114 | 1.1% |
| Some other race | 748 | 7.0% |
| Two or more races | 1,268 | 11.9% |
| Hispanic or Latino (of any race) | 1,470 | 13.8% |

=== 2010 census ===
As of the 2010 census, there were 9,451 people, 3,980 households, and 2,454 families living in the city. The population density was 1,258.5 inhabitants per square mile (485.9/km^{2}). There were 4,279 housing units at an average density of 569.8 per square mile (220.0/km^{2}). The racial makeup of the city was 87.3% White, 1.2% African American, 1.0% Native American, 2.4% Asian, 0.4% Pacific Islander, 3.4% from other races, and 4.3% from two or more races. Hispanic or Latino of any race were 10.1% of the population.

There were 3,980 households, of which 31.8% had children under the age of 18 living with them, 40.8% were married couples living together, 14.7% had a female householder with no husband present, 6.2% had a male householder with no wife present, and 38.3% were non-families. 31.7% of all households were made up of individuals, and 13.1% had someone living alone who was 65 years of age or older. The average household size was 2.37 and the average family size was 2.97.

The median age in the city was 38.2 years. 24.4% of residents were under the age of 18; 8.1% were between the ages of 18 and 24; 26.7% were from 25 to 44; 25.8% were from 45 to 64; and 14.9% were 65 years of age or older. The gender makeup of the city was 48.2% male and 51.8% female.

=== 2000 census ===
As of the 2000 census, there were 8,504 people, 3,517 households, and 2,215 families living in the city. The population density was 1,271.0 people per square mile (490.8/km^{2}). There were 3,689 housing units at an average density of 551.4 per square mile (212.9/km^{2}). The racial makeup of the city was 90.32% White, 0.93% African American, 1.41% Native American, 1.66% Asian, 0.24% Pacific Islander, 2.42% from other races, and 3.02% from two or more races. Hispanic or Latino of any race were 5.97% of the population.

There were 3,517 households, out of which 32.0% had children under the age of 18 living with them, 44.4% were married couples living together, 13.7% had a female householder with no husband present, and 37.0% were non-families. 30.7% of all households were made up of individuals, and 11.8% had someone living alone who was 65 years of age or older. The average household size was 2.40 and the average family size was 2.98.

In the city, the age distribution of the population shows 26.5% under the age of 18, 8.7% from 18 to 24, 30.3% from 25 to 44, 21.1% from 45 to 64, and 13.4% who were 65 years of age or older. The median age was 35 years. For every 100 females, there were 94.0 males. For every 100 females age 18 and over, there were 89.0 males.

The median income for a household in the city was $38,598, and the median income for a family was $42,602. Males had a median income of $36,250 versus $29,221 for females. The per capita income for the city was $18,696. About 4.5% of families and 8.5% of the population were below the poverty line, including 9.3% of those under age 18 and 8.6% of those age 65 or over.

== Transportation ==
In addition to road and highway connections, Sumner is also served by Sounder commuter rail which stops at a train station in downtown and directly connects Sumner to Seattle and Tacoma.

== Education ==
Most of the city is in the Sumner School District, while some portions are in the adjacent Dieringer School District and Puyallup School District.

Sumner has a branch of the Pierce County Library System.

== Culture ==
Sumner hosts part of the annual four-part Daffodil Parade, which takes place every April in Tacoma, Puyallup, Sumner, and Orting. The city also calls itself the "Rhubarb Pie Capital of the World," and hosts an annual festival called Rhubarb Days.

== Notable people ==
- Eddie Dew, actor and director
- Wayne Northrop, actor
- Kelly Joe Phelps, musician
