= Tehaleh, Washington =

Unincorporated community in Washington, US

Coordinates: 47°07′28″N 122°11′08″W

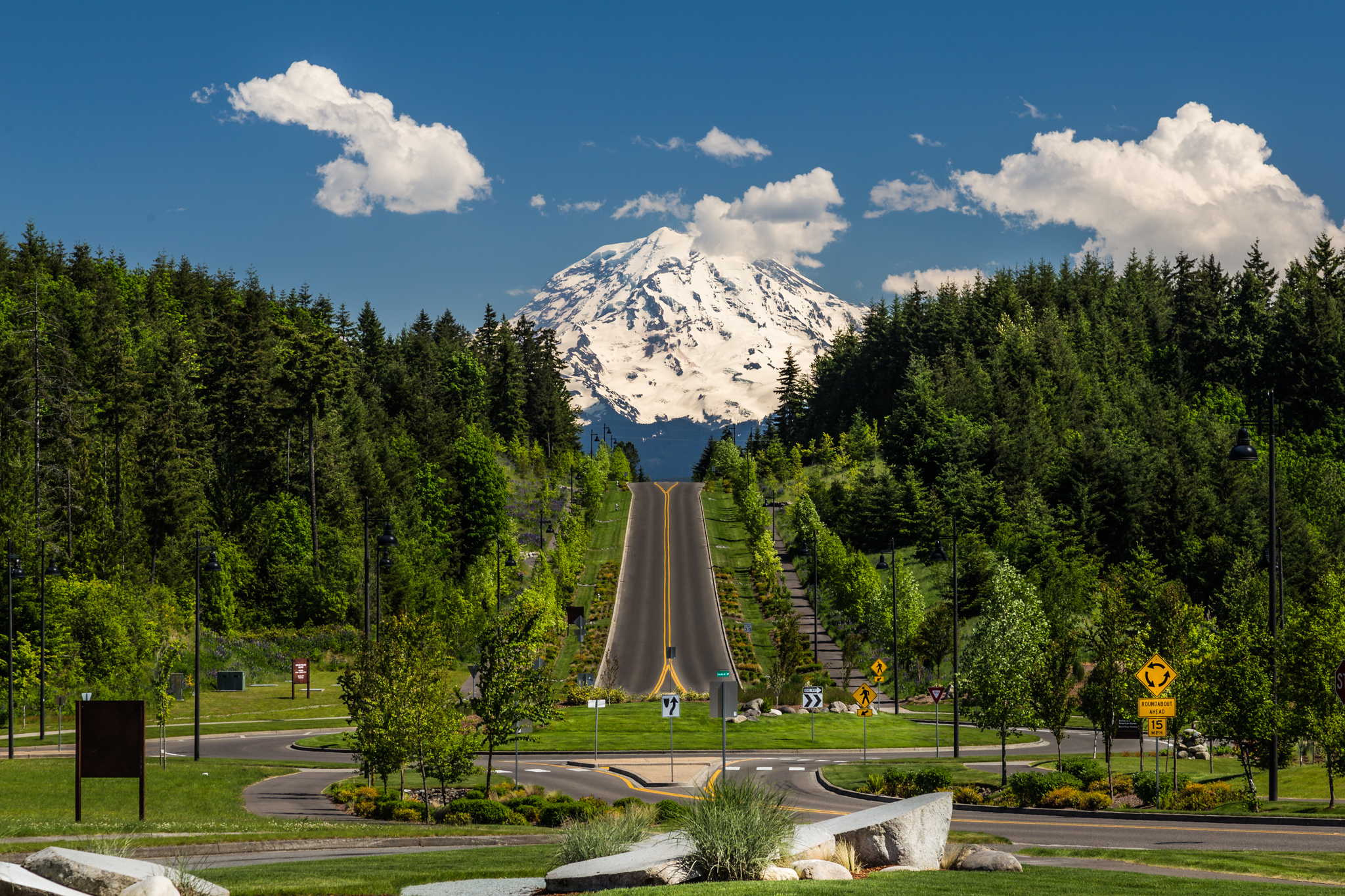
View of Mount Rainier from The Post at Tehaleh

Tehaleh, formerly known as Cascadia, is a master-planned unincorporated community to the south of Bonney Lake in Pierce County, Washington, United States. As of the 2020 census, Tehaleh had a population of 5,784. Construction began in 2005 with an estimated timeline for completion of 20 years. The town was designed by Patrick Kuo, who had purchased the land in 1991. Included in the original plan for Cascadia were 6,500 homes, a commercial district, an industrial park, schools, and recreational parkland for residents to enjoy. Construction halted in 2008, prior to the construction of any homes or commercial properties. After foreclosure proceedings in 2010, Homestreet Bank repossessed much of Kuo's land, intending to find another developer.

== History ==
=== Financial crisis ===
In October 2009, Cascadia Project LLC, the company behind the planning of Cascadia, filed for Chapter 11 bankruptcy protection. According to HomeStreet Bank, which financed the project, over 72 million dollars of loans were non-performing. HomeStreet Bank had planned to foreclose and auction off the land of the community, which had been running behind schedule with only a school and some road-related infrastructure completed. The bankruptcy restructuring plan proposed by Cascadia Project LLC was rejected by the U.S. Bankruptcy Court, and HomeStreet Bank completed foreclosure of the land and held an auction September 24, 2010. As there were no qualified bidders, the property reverted to HomeStreet Bank ownership. Following the auction HomeStreet Bank intended to find another developer for the community.

=== Recovery as Tehaleh ===
Newland Communities and North American Sekisui House salvaged the project in 2011 by purchasing 4,200 of the original 5,000 acres of land for 49 million dollars. The development was renamed Tehaleh, derived from Chinook jargon meaning “highlands” or “the land above”. The revised plan calls for constructing 5,900 houses and 4 million square feet of business property within the next 25 years. The plan also retains the many parks and trails included in the failed Cascadia project. On 26 September 2012, Tehaleh opened its first ten model houses.

Due to its elevated geography on a plateau, several hundred feet above the adjacent Puyallup River valley, Tehaleh is not at risk of flooding from the Puyallup River unlike many communities in close proximity to Mount Rainier. In the event of an eruption of Mount Rainier, Tehaleh is not within the USGS delineated mudslides hazard zone. Because of its elevation and location outside of the lahar inundation zone, a project has been proposed to construct a bridge from Orting to Tehaleh, called Bridge for Kids, to provide Orting residents an additional evacuation route to the high ground on Tehaleh, in case of emergency.

== Education ==
Tehaleh currently has two public elementary schools, Donald Eismann Elementary and Tehaleh Heights Elementary, both are operated by Sumner-Bonney Lake School District.

Mountain View Middle School, located 3.2 miles north of Tehaleh, serves as the middle school for residents of Tehaleh. Across the street from the middle school, Bonney Lake High School serves as the high school residents of Tehaleh. Both the middle and the high schools are operated by Sumner-Bonney Lake School District. Newer homes in Tehaleh are located in the Orting school district which has resulted in Tehaleh students having to attend two separate school districts.

== Demographics ==
Historical population
Census	Pop.	Note	%±
2020	5,784		—
U.S. Decennial Census

Tehaleh first appeared as a census designated place in the 2020 U.S. census.

=== Racial and ethnic composition ===
Tehaleh CDP, Washington – Racial and ethnic composition Note: the US Census treats Hispanic/Latino as an ethnic category. This table excludes Latinos from the racial categories and assigns them to a separate category. Hispanics/Latinos may be of any race.
Race / Ethnicity (NH = Non-Hispanic)	Pop 2020	2020
White alone (NH)	4,156	71.85%
Black or African American alone (NH)	140	2.42%
Native American or Alaska Native alone (NH)	23	0.40%
Asian alone (NH)	331	5.72%
Native Hawaiian or Pacific Islander alone (NH)	27	0.47%
Other race alone (NH)	49	0.85%
Mixed race or Multiracial (NH)	585	10.11%
Hispanic or Latino (any race)	473	8.18%
Total	5,784	100.00%

== Infrastructure ==
=== Transportation ===
==== Public Transportation ====
There is no direct public transportation service to Tehaleh. The closest bus stop is the Bonney Lake Park-and-Ride, located roughly 5 miles north. Residents who commute to Seattle usually take the bus from the Bonney Lake Park-and-Ride to the Sumner Station where they board Sound Transit's Sounder train service to Seattle.

=== Restaurants ===
==== The Mantel ====
The Mantel, is a private dining establishment set within Seven Summits Lodge in the Trilogy, a 55+ community within Tehaleh. The Mantel is a members-only establishment that is not open to the general public. A limited number of annual dining memberships are made available each year.

==== Post and Pour ====
Located within The Post, Post & Pour is a Cafe, Bistro, and Tap House that seeks to be a new community gathering space.

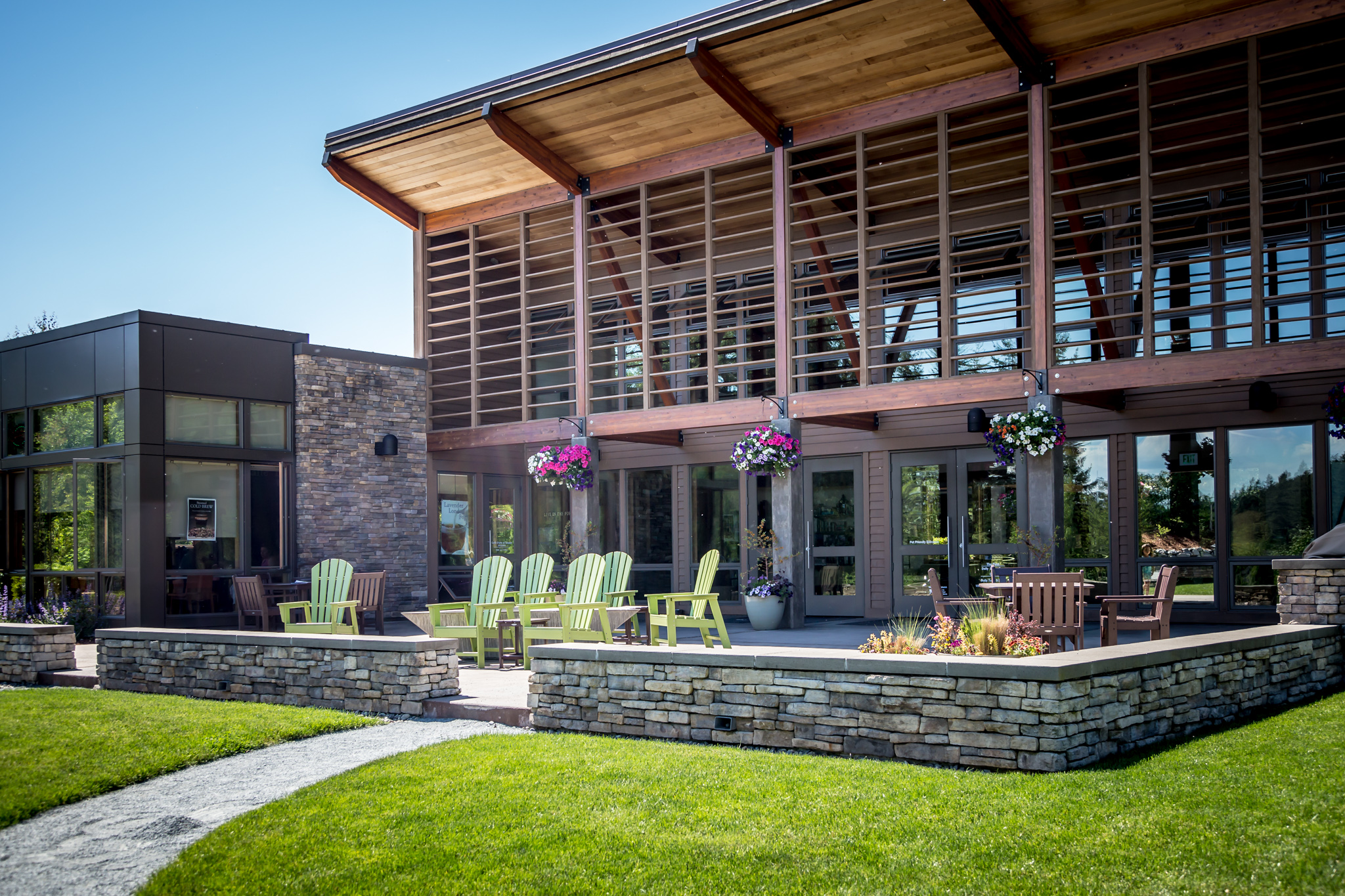
Outdoor living at The Post at Tehaleh

== The Post ==
The Post currently serves as the main community and information center for Tehaleh. Residents and visitors can stop by for information about the community as well as a grab something to eat, drink, or just relax.

The Post also offers two outdoor seating areas, front and back of the building. The front outdoor seating area offers scenic views of the Mount Rainier.

== Parks and trails ==
Tehaleh master plan includes 1,800 acres of trails, parks and open space. Currently, there are 12 parks and more than 10 miles of trails with several more parks and trails in the future plan.
