= Orting, Washington =

City in Washington, United States

- City
- City of Orting
- Location of Orting, Washington
- Coordinates: 47°05′48″N 122°12′40″W
- Country: United States
- State: Washington
- County: Pierce
- Established: April 22, 1889

Government
  - Type: Mayor–council
  - Mayor: Scott Drennean name="Mayor"/>

Area
  - Total: 2.76 sq mi (7.15 km^{2})
  - Land: 2.71 sq mi (7.01 km^{2})
  - Water: 0.054 sq mi (0.14 km^{2})
- Elevation: 190 ft (58 m)

Population (2020)
  - Total: 9,041
  - Density: 3,182.6/sq mi (1,228.79/km^{2})
- Time zone: UTC-8 (Pacific (PST))
  - Summer (DST): UTC-7 (PDT)
- ZIP code: 98360
- Area codes: 360, 564
- FIPS code: 53-52005
- GNIS feature ID: 2411339
- Website: cityoforting.org

Orting is a city in Pierce County, Washington, United States. The population was 9,041 at the 2020 census. It is located between the Puyallup and Carbon rivers in central Pierce County, approximately 30 miles (48 km) northwest of Mount Rainier.

== History ==
The first recorded claims for land in Orting were made in 1854 by William Henry Whitesell, Thomas Headley, Daniel Lane, and Daniel Varner. Streets in the modern city are named after the four men, and a monument in Orting City Park commemorates them. The area was named Gunson's Prairie by early settlers and later known as Carbon. The townsite was renamed Orting by a Northern Pacific Railway superintendent in 1877 during construction of the company's railroad to Wilkeson. The name is claimed to be an indigenous word meaning "prairie". Orting was officially incorporated as a city on April 22, 1889.

Early growth surrounded the area's production and logging industries. Later, Christmas tree and flower bulb farms also became part of the local economy. Orting was also a supply town for the coal mining towns Wilkeson and Carbonado. The first railroad in the city was built in 1877 by the Northern Pacific Railway, called "Whitesell's Crossing" because it ran right through the Whitesell property. Because railroads eased transportation, Orting's population quickly increased. Remaining parts from the railroad are part of the Meeker Southern Railroad, which runs between Puyallup and McMillin.

Orting's boundaries remained unchanged until its first annexation was completed in February 1959. The city became a suburban bedroom community for commuters from Tacoma and Seattle in the 2000s; several residential subdivisions were constructed in the areas surrounding Orting's historic downtown. In March 2008, the city's weekly newspaper, The Gazette, ceased publication.

== Geography ==
According to the United States Census Bureau, the city has a total area of 2.80 square miles (7.25 km^{2}), of which 2.73 square miles (7.07 km^{2}) is land and 0.07 square miles (0.18 km^{2}) is water.

=== Mount Rainier ===
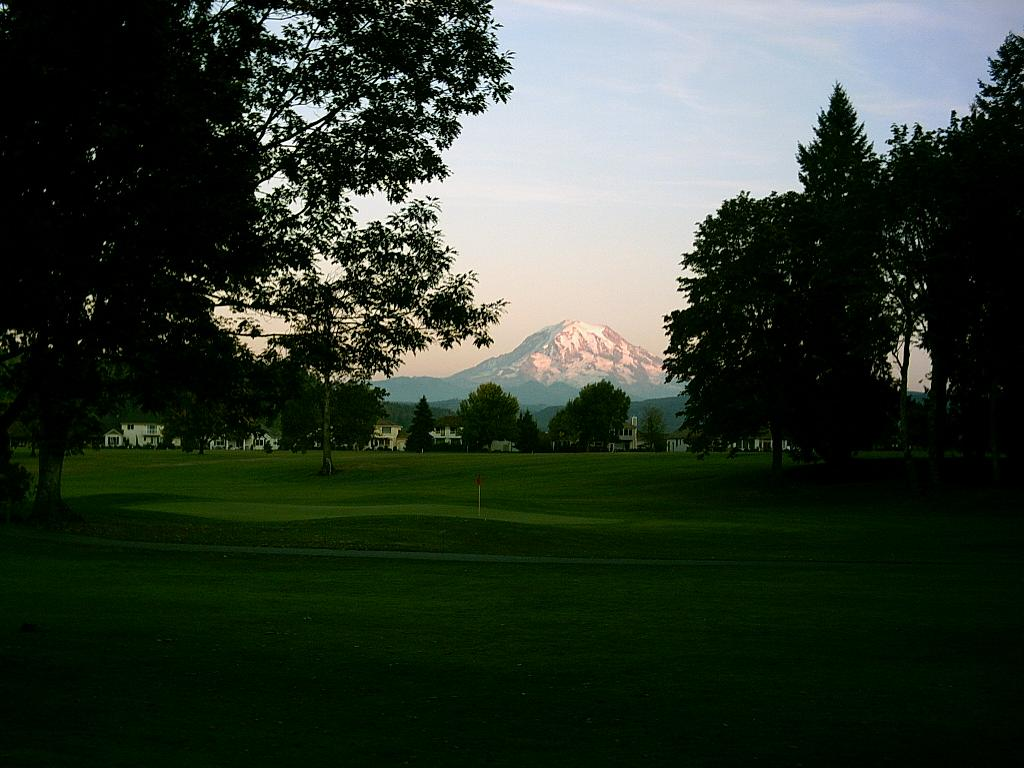
Mount Rainier as seen from the High Cedars Golf Course in Orting, bordering the Puyallup River

The city sits in a fertile valley between two major rivers, the Carbon and Puyallup. It is built entirely on several layers of lahar deposits. Orting is located about 30 mi (48 km) from Mount Rainier. Based on studies of past lahar flow and the mountain's structure, Orting has been designated the most at-risk city from Mount Rainier's lahar activity; scientists predict that lahar could reach Orting in 30 minutes from the mountain. The Mount Rainier Volcano Lahar Warning System has installed sirens throughout the area, activated by sensors on Mount Rainier. Local schools regularly stage lahar evacuation drills and residents are informed of lahar escape routes. Local citizens are designing the Bridge for Kids, a walking bridge across the Carbon River that could be used for recreation and rapid evacuation toward Cascadia, Washington.

== Demographics ==
Historical population
| Census | Pop. | Note | %± |
|---|---|---|---|
| 1890 | 623 | | — |
| 1900 | 728 | | 16.9% |
| 1910 | 799 | | 9.8% |
| 1920 | 972 | | 21.7% |
| 1930 | 1,109 | | 14.1% |
| 1940 | 1,211 | | 9.2% |
| 1950 | 1,299 | | 7.3% |
| 1960 | 1,520 | | 17.0% |
| 1970 | 1,643 | | 8.1% |
| 1980 | 1,787 | | 8.8% |
| 1990 | 2,106 | | 17.9% |
| 2000 | 3,760 | | 78.5% |
| 2010 | 6,746 | | 79.4% |
| 2020 | 9,041 | | 34.0% |
U.S. Decennial Census; 2020 Census

=== 2020 census ===
As of the 2020 census, Orting had a population of 9,041. The median age was 34.7 years; 28.3% of residents were under the age of 18 and 11.7% were 65 years of age or older. For every 100 females there were 102.4 males, and for every 100 females age 18 and over there were 101.2 males age 18 and over.

99.9% of residents lived in urban areas, while 0.1% lived in rural areas.

There were 2,916 households in Orting, of which 45.0% had children under the age of 18 living in them. Of all households, 59.2% were married-couple households, 13.9% were households with a male householder and no spouse or partner present, and 18.1% were households with a female householder and no spouse or partner present. About 16.0% of all households were made up of individuals and 6.9% had someone living alone who was 65 years of age or older.

There were 2,999 housing units, of which 2.8% were vacant. The homeowner vacancy rate was 0.6% and the rental vacancy rate was 5.5%.

Racial composition as of the 2020 census
| Race | Number | Percent |
|---|---|---|
| White | 7,189 | 79.5% |
| Black or African American | 223 | 2.5% |
| American Indian and Alaska Native | 109 | 1.2% |
| Asian | 233 | 2.6% |
| Native Hawaiian and Other Pacific Islander | 86 | 1.0% |
| Some other race | 219 | 2.4% |
| Two or more races | 982 | 10.9% |
| Hispanic or Latino (of any race) | 783 | 8.7% |

=== 2010 census ===
The 2010 United States census recorded 6,746 people, 2,184 households and 1,688 families residing in the city. The population density was 2,471.1 per square mile (954.1/km^{2}). There were 2,361 housing units, with an average density of 864.8 per square mile (333.9/km^{2}). The racial makeup was 87.9% white, 1.5% African American, 1.4% Native American, 1.3% Asian, 0.5% Pacific Islander, 2.4% from other races, and 5.0% from two or more races. Hispanics or Latinos of any race comprised 7.2% of the population.

Of the 2,184 households, 48.4% had children under the age of 18 living with them, 59.5% had married couples living together, 11.5% had a female householder with no husband present, 6.3% had a male householder with no wife present, and 22.7% did not have families. Households with only one person made up 16.5% and the total, and those with an individual person 65 years of age or older made up 5.8%. The average household size was 3.01 people and the average family size was 3.34.

The median age was 32.7 years: 30.7% of residents were under the age of 18; 7.8%, between the ages of 18 and 24, 31.8%, from 25 to 44, 19.5%, 45 to 64 and 10.2% were 65 years of age or older. The sex makeup was 50.7% male and 49.3% female.

=== 2000 census ===
The median household income was $53,464 and the median family income was $55,335. Males had a median income of $41,486 and females $26,438. The per capita income was $18,951. About 4.2% of families and 6.5% of the population had incomes below the poverty line, including 5.2% of those under the age of 18 and 15.8% of those 65 and older.

== Places ==
=== Washington Soldiers Home ===
The Washington Soldiers Home provides nursing care, medical care and support services for veterans and family members. It is located on the Orting Kapowsin Highway southwest of the city. Nearby, the Soldiers Home Cemetery contains 2,265 graves, including four Medal of Honor recipients from the American Civil War.

=== Hatcheries ===
The Voights Creek Hatchery is located outside Orting, attracting fishermen for its salmon.

=== Parks and murals ===
Orting has several city parks, including community and neighborhood parks with sportsfields and walking trails. Main City Park in downtown includes a covered gazebo and a memorial wall. Historic murals are scattered on buildings throughout the city.

== Daffodil Parade ==
Orting is the fourth and final stop in the annual Daffodil Festival Parade. With the exception of 2020 due to the COVID-19 pandemic and 1943-1945 due to the Second World War, the parade has gone through downtown Orting since 1934 and draws over 10,000 people in early April to festivities. The parade can be seen in late afternoon. It also goes through the cities of Tacoma, Puyallup and Sumner. School bands play and the Daffodil Queen appears.

== Public safety ==
The Orting Police handle law enforcement within city limits, comprising 11 commissioned officers and one full-time working civilian. Despite large growth in population, the police department's staffing levels have experienced little change.

In November 2016, the City of Orting paid $250,000 to a former Orting police officer, Gerry Pickens for being racially targeted in the city and was fired a few days before his probationary period was due to end. His personal vehicle was spray-painted with a racial slur and a threat to not sue the police chief. The legal settlement was controversial at the time as it occurred despite the release of an independent investigation into Pickens' employment with the city revealed numerous reports of his on-duty misconduct, neglect of duty, dishonesty and general incompetence in his role as a police officer.

Orting Valley Fire and Rescue handles all fire and medical aid service needs in the city and the surrounding unincorporated area. It operates three stations.

=== Healthcare ===
Orting is served by MultiCare Health System and has a MultiCare Indigo urgent care center.

Orting has a privately owned Orting Dental Center.

== Education ==
The Orting School District operates four schools:

- Orting Elementary School (grades pre-K–5)
- Ptarmigan Ridge Elementary School (grades K–5)
- Orting Middle School (grades 6–8)
- Orting High School (grades 9–12)

== Transportation ==
Orting is close to State Route 162. The closest Sounder commuter rail station is in Sumner, Washington.

=== Foothills Trail ===
The Pierce County Foothills Trail is a paved trail built on an old railroad bed. It runs through Orting to Enumclaw in one direction and to Sumner in the other. Activities allowed on the trail include walking, bicycling, horseback riding, skating, skateboarding and scooter riding. Motorized vehicles are prohibited. Although the trail was built for recreation, many bicycle commuters use it.

== Notable people ==
- Casey Carrigan, athlete in the 1968 Summer Olympics, attended Orting High School
