= Casey Carrigan =

American pole vaulter (born 1951)

Personal information
- Nationality: American
- Born: 4 February 1951 (age 75) in Puyallup, Washington, United States
- Height: 183 cm (6 ft 0 in)
- Weight: 77 kg (170 lb)

Sport
- Sport: Athletics
- Event: Orting High School
- Club: pole vault

Casey O. Carrigan (born February 4, 1951) is an American track and field athlete. He was the American high school record holder in the pole vault while at Orting High School and competed at the 1968 Summer Olympics.

== Biography ==
He qualified for the 1968 United States Olympic Trials. In 1968 there was a semi-Olympic trials required to make the final. In that meet, Carrigan finished in a non-qualifying seventh place, only jumping 4.87 m (15 ft 11 1/2 in). But seventh place was enough to get into the finals. In the finals, he jumped 5.18 m (16 ft 11 3/4 in) on his first attempt, putting him into solid second place behind John Pennel, ahead of Bob Seagren and Dick Railsback both of whom cleared it on their second attempt. Seagren continued on to jump a new World Record of 5.41 m (17 ft 8 3/4 in), but all the others were unable to make the next height. Carrigan had qualified for the Olympics in the pole vault while still in high school. At the Olympics, Carrigan was only able to clear 4.60, finishing twelfth in his qualifying group and not advancing. After clearing his opening height he passed to 4.90, the height required to advance. After missing his first two attempts, he cleared the third attempt by a foot and a half (the first 18-foot vault occurred two years later), what he considered the best vault of his life, but the officials ruled his pole broke the plane of the bar, a violation at the time.

Carrigan began vaulting in fifth grade with his brothers in a backyard wood chip pit. Fiberglass poles were invented three years later. As a freshman, he went 14'6" which advanced to 15'8" by his sophomore year. His Olympic Trials jump was the national record that he improved to 17'4¾" in 1969. It has remained as the Washington state record ever since. He was ranked #6 in the world in 1969. Other than his father getting film of collegiate vaulters, he was self coached through most of his career.

He finished third at the 1968 and 1969 USA Outdoor Track and Field Championships. He got a scholarship to Stanford University, finishing in a tie for fourth place at the 1970 NCAA Championships. After a year of college, burn out set in and he gave up his scholarship. He didn't even try for the 1972 Olympics, but came back in 1974 to become the #4 ranked vaulter in the world. He won the British AAA Championships title in the pole vault event at the 1974 AAA Championships.

He set his personal best of 5.45 m (17 ft 10 1/2 in) in 1975, which at the time was only 20 cm below the world record.

Carrigan later worked as a firefighter in Long Beach, California, until his retirement in 2009. He described the selection process for the job to be more competitive than the Olympics.
